= List of endangered plants =

- Extinct in the wild (EW): 46 species
- Critically endangered (CR): 6,445 species
- Endangered (EN): 12,707 species
- Vulnerable (VU): 10,596 species
- Near threatened (NT, LR/cd): 4,880 species
- Least concern (LC): 35,732 species
- Data deficient (DD): 6,317 species
Plant species (IUCN, 2025.2)
- 76,864 extant species have been evaluated
- 70,547 of those are fully assessed (Note: excludes data deficient evaluations.)
- 40,612 are not threatened at present
- 29,935 are threatened (Note: Threatened comprises CR, EN and VU.)
- 187 to 892 are extinct or extinct in the wild:
  - 141 extinct (EX) species (Note: Chart omits extinct (EX) species)
  - 46 extinct in the wild (EW)
  - 648 possibly extinct [CR(PE)]
  - 57 possibly extinct in the wild [CR(PEW)]

Endangered (EN) species are considered to be facing a very high risk of extinction in the wild.

In September 2016, the International Union for Conservation of Nature (IUCN) listed 3654 endangered plant species. Of all evaluated plant species, 17% are listed as endangered. The IUCN also lists 99 subspecies and 101 varieties as endangered. No subpopulations of plants have been evaluated by the IUCN.

For a species to be considered endangered by the IUCN it must meet certain quantitative criteria which are designed to classify taxa facing "a very high risk of extinction". An even higher risk is faced by critically endangered species, which meet the quantitative criteria for endangered species. Critically endangered plants are listed separately. There are 6147 plant species which are endangered or critically endangered.

Additionally 1674 plant species (7.6% of those evaluated) are listed as data deficient, meaning there is insufficient information for a full assessment of conservation status. As these species typically have small distributions and/or populations, they are intrinsically likely to be threatened, according to the IUCN. While the category of data deficient indicates that no assessment of extinction risk has been made for the taxa, the IUCN notes that it may be appropriate to give them "the same degree of attention as threatened taxa, at least until their status can be assessed".

This is a complete list of endangered plant species, subspecies and varieties evaluated by the IUCN.

== Bryophytes ==
There are 29 bryophyte species assessed as endangered.

=== Hornworts ===
- Anthoceros neesii, Nees' hornwort
- Dendroceros japonicus

=== Mosses ===
- Bryoxiphium madeirense
- Distichophyllum carinatum
- Jaffueliobryum arsenei
- Mamillariella geniculata
- Merrilliobryum fabronioides
- Mitrobryum koelzii
- Orthodontopsis bardunovii
- Orthotrichum truncato-dentatum
- Renauldia lycopodioides
- Sciaromiopsis sinensis
- Skottsbergia paradoxa

=== Liverworts ===
- Aitchisoniella himalayensis
- Andrewsianthus ferrugineus
- Caudalejeunea grolleana
- Cladolejeunea aberrans
- Cololejeunea magnilobula
- Diplocolea sikkimensis
- Drepanolejeunea aculeata
- Drepanolejeunea bakeri
- Eopleurozia simplicissima
- Leptolejeunea tridentata
- Schistochila macrodonta
- Sphaerocarpos drewiae
- Stephensoniella brevipedunculata
- Symbiezidium madagascariense

== Pteridophytes ==
There are 67 species and one subspecies of pteridophyte assessed as endangered.

=== Leptosporangiate ferns ===
There are 61 species and one subspecies in the class Polypodiopsida assessed as endangered.

==== Polypodiales ====
Species

- Acrorumohra hasseltii
- Actiniopteris kornasii
- Adenophorus epigaeus
- Adiantum fengianum
- Adiantum sinicum
- Aleuritopteris grevilleoides
- Aleuritopteris squamosa
- Arachniodes squamulosa
- Arachniodes tsiangiana
- Asplenium virens
- Blechnum floresii
- Blotiella hieronymi
- Callipteris ulugurica
- Calymmodon cucullatus
- Cheilanthes deboeri
- Cyclosorus boydiae, Boyd's maidenfern
- Cyclosorus wailele, Waioli Valley maidenfern
- Cyrtomium hemionitis
- Diplazium avitaguense
- Diplazium hieronymi
- Diplazium pseudoporrectum
- Diplazium vesiculosum
- Dryopteris napoleonis, small kidney fern
- Dryopteris raddeana, Radde's buckler fern
- Elaphoglossum engleri
- Elaphoglossum herpestes
- Elaphoglossum hornei
- Elaphoglossum isophyllum
- Elaphoglossum spectabile
- Grammitis basalis
- Microgramma tuberosum
- Microlepia fadenii
- Neocheiropteris palmatopedata
- Oleandra hainanensis
- Pneumatopteris usambarensis
- Polystichum bulbiferum
- Pteris mkomaziensis
- Pyrrosia liebuschii
- Radiogrammitis cheesemanii
- Saccoloma laxum
- Saccoloma squamosum
- Stenochlaena hainanensis
- Thelypteris bermudiana, Bermuda shield fern
- Thelypteris macra
- Vittaria schliebenii
- Zygophlebia eminens
- Zygophlebia major

Subspecies

- Pteris albersii subsp. albersii

==== Hymenophyllales ====
- Hymenophyllum capillaceum, St Helena filmy fern
- Hymenophyllum megistocarpum
- Hymenophyllum nanum

==== Cyatheales ====
- Alsophila esmeraldensis
- Cyathea crinita
- Cyathea fadenii
- Cyathea heliophila
- Cyathea palaciosii
- Cyathea schliebenii
- Plagiogyria assurgens

==== Salviniales ====
- Marsilea batardae, Lusitanian water clover
- Marsilea botryocarpa
- Marsilea villosa
- Pilularia minuta, dwarf pillwort

=== Isoetopsida ===
- Isoetes boryana, Gascoyne quillwort
- Isoetes capensis
- Isoetes fluitans, river quillwort
- Isoetes panchganiensis

=== Lycopodiopsida ===
- Huperzia hastata
- Huperzia loxensis

== Gymnosperms ==
There are 163 species, seven subspecies, and 29 varieties of gymnosperm assessed as endangered.

=== Ginkgos ===
- Ginkgo biloba, ginkgo

=== Cycads ===
Species

- Ceratozamia alvarezii
- Ceratozamia becerrae
- Ceratozamia hildae, bamboo cycad
- Ceratozamia latifolia
- Ceratozamia matudae
- Ceratozamia mirandae
- Ceratozamia mixeorum
- Ceratozamia morettii
- Ceratozamia norstogii
- Ceratozamia robusta
- Ceratozamia sabatoi
- Ceratozamia whitelockiana
- Cycas beddomei
- Cycas candida, white seed sago
- Cycas changjiangensis
- Cycas circinalis
- Cycas elephantipes
- Cycas elongata
- Cycas hainanensis
- Cycas hoabinhensis
- Cycas javana
- Cycas lindstromii
- Cycas micronesica
- Cycas multipinnata
- Cycas platyphylla
- Cycas riuminiana, Arayat pitogo
- Cycas taitungensis
- Cycas taiwaniana
- Dioon califanoi
- Dioon caputoi
- Dioon holmgrenii
- Dioon rzedowskii
- Dioon sonorense
- Dioon spinulosum
- Encephalartos arenarius, Alexandria cycad
- Encephalartos chimanimaniensis, Chimanimani cycad
- Encephalartos concinnus, Runde cycad
- Encephalartos delucanus
- Encephalartos eugene-maraisii, Waterberg cycad
- Encephalartos horridus, Eastern Cape blue cycad
- Encephalartos kisambo, Voi cycad
- Encephalartos lebomboensis, Lebombo cycad
- Encephalartos macrostrobilus
- Encephalartos umbeluziensis, Umbeluzi cycad
- Macrozamia cranei
- Macrozamia elegans
- Macrozamia flexuosa
- Macrozamia lomandroides
- Macrozamia pauli-guilielmi
- Macrozamia plurinervia
- Macrozamia spiralis
- Macrozamia viridis
- Zamia cremnophila
- Zamia dressleri
- Zamia elegantissima
- Zamia fischeri
- Zamia furfuracea, cardboard palm
- Zamia ipetiensis
- Zamia katzeriana
- Zamia lacandona
- Zamia lucayana
- Zamia melanorrhachis
- Zamia portoricensis
- Zamia skinneri
- Zamia variegata

Subspecies

- Encephalartos barteri subsp. allochrous

=== Conifers ===
Species

- Abies fanjingshanensis
- Abies fraseri, Fraser fir
- Abies guatemalensis, Guatemalan fir
- Abies hickelii, Hickel's fir
- Abies koreana, Korean fir
- Abies pinsapo, Spanish fir
- Abies ziyuanensis, Ziyuan fir
- Agathis borneensis
- Agathis kinabaluensis
- Agathis orbicula
- Amentotaxus assamica, Assam catkin yew
- Amentotaxus hatuyenensis
- Araucaria araucana, monkey puzzle
- Araucaria humboldtensis
- Araucaria luxurians
- Araucaria muelleri
- Araucaria rulei
- Araucaria scopulorum
- Athrotaxis laxifolia
- Callitris sulcata
- Calocedrus formosana, Taiwan incense-cedar
- Calocedrus rupestris
- Cedrus atlantica, Atlas cedar
- Cephalotaxus hainanensis, Hainan plum yew
- Cephalotaxus lanceolata, Gongshan plum yew
- Chamaecyparis formosensis, Taiwan cypress
- Cunninghamia konishii
- Cupressus goveniana, Gowen cypress
- Cupressus guadalupensis, Guadalupe cypress
- Cupressus guadalupensis var. forbesii, synonym of Hesperocyparis forbesii
- Fitzroya cupressoides, Patagonian cypress
- Juniperus cedrus, Canary Islands juniper
- Juniperus comitana
- Juniperus gamboana
- Juniperus gracilior
- Juniperus jaliscana
- Juniperus saltillensis
- Juniperus standleyi
- Larix mastersiana, Masters' larch
- Libocedrus yateensis
- Metasequoia glyptostroboides, dawn redwood
- Neocallitropsis pancheri
- Pectinopitys standleyi
- Picea aurantiaca, orange spruce
- Picea chihuahuana, Chihuahua spruce
- Picea martinezii, Martinez's spruce
- Picea maximowiczii, Maximowicz's spruce
- Picea omorika, Serbian spruce
- Picea retroflexa, Tapao Shan spruce
- Pinus albicaulis, whitebark pine
- Pinus amamiana, Amami pine
- Pinus culminicola, Potosi pinyon pine
- Pinus maximartinezii, Martinez pinyon
- Pinus nelsonii, Nelson pinyon pine
- Pinus occidentalis, Hispaniolan pine
- Pinus palustris, longleaf pine
- Pinus radiata, Monterey pine
- Pinus wangii
- Pseudotsuga japonica, Japanese Douglas-fir
- Sequoia sempervirens, coast redwood
- Sequoiadendron giganteum, giant sequoia
- Taxus chinensis, Chinese yew
- Taxus contorta, West Himalayan yew
- Taxus globosa, Mesoamerican yew
- Taxus wallichiana, East Himalayan yew
- Thuja sutchuenensis
- Torreya jackii, Jack's nutmeg tree
- Xanthocyparis vietnamensis, golden Vietnamese cypress

Subspecies

- Abies nordmanniana subsp. equi-trojani, Kazdagi fir
- Picea engelmannii subsp. mexicana, Mexican spruce
- Pinus cembroides subsp. orizabensis, Orizaba pinyon
- Pinus mugo subsp. rotundata
- Pinus nigra subsp. dalmatica
- Pinus pinaster subsp. renoui

Varieties

- Abies guatemalensis var. guatemalensis
- Abies hickelii var. hickelii
- Abies hickelii var. oaxacana
- Abies pinsapo var. marocana, Moroccan fir
- Abies pinsapo var. pinsapo
- Cephalotaxus harringtonii var. wilsoniana, Taiwan plum yew
- Cupressus arizonica var. nevadensis
- Cupressus goveniana var. goveniana
- Cupressus guadalupensis var. forbesii
- Cupressus guadalupensis var. guadalupensis
- Juniperus deppeana var. zacatecensis
- Juniperus gracilior var. gracilior
- Juniperus gracilior var. urbaniana
- Keteleeria davidiana var. formosana
- Larix decidua var. polonica
- Picea alcoquiana var. acicularis
- Picea alcoquiana var. reflexa
- Picea asperata var. notabilis
- Picea likiangensis var. hirtella
- Picea maximowiczii var. maximowiczii
- Pinus armandii var. mastersiana
- Pinus caribaea var. caribaea
- Pinus greggii var. australis
- Pinus radiata var. radiata, Cambria pine
- Pinus strobus var. chiapensis
- Torreya fargesii var. fargesii
- Torreya fargesii var. yunnanensis

==== Podocarpaceae ====
- Afrocarpus mannii
- Afrocarpus usambarensis
- Dacrydium comosum
- Dacrydium nausoriense
- Dacrydium pectinatum
- Falcatifolium angustum
- Nageia maxima
- Podocarpus buchii
- Podocarpus capuronii
- Podocarpus confertus
- Podocarpus costalis
- Podocarpus decumbens
- Podocarpus globulus
- Podocarpus henkelii, Henkel's yellowwood
- Podocarpus hispaniolensis
- Podocarpus humbertii
- Podocarpus laubenfelsii
- Podocarpus macrocarpus
- Podocarpus madagascariensis var. procerus
- Podocarpus nakaii
- Podocarpus pendulifolius
- Podocarpus polyspermus
- Podocarpus purdieanus, St. Ann yacca
- Podocarpus rostratus
- Podocarpus sellowii
- Podocarpus sellowii var. sellowii
- Podocarpus sprucei
- Podocarpus transiens
- Retrophyllum minus

=== Gnetopsida ===
- Gnetum oxycarpum

== Dicotyledons ==
There are 2770 species, 81 subspecies, and 70 varieties of dicotyledon assessed as endangered.

=== Apiales ===
There are 63 species and one variety in the order Apiales assessed as endangered.

==== Apiaceae ====
- Angelica adzharica, Adjarian angelica
- Angelica glauca
- Astrantia colchica, Colchic masterwort
- Berula burchellii, dwarf jellico
- Bilacunaria caspia, Caspian bilacunaria
- Bupleurum euphorbioides
- Bupleurum handiense
- Bupleurum schistosum, divided thoroughwax
- Carum asinorum
- Carum komarovii, Komarov's caraway
- Cryptotaenia calycina
- Cryptotaenia polygama
- Eryngium galioides
- Eryngium viviparum
- Ferula sadleriana
- Heracleum egrissicum, Egrissian cow-parsnip
- Hydrocotyle conferta
- Laserpitium affine, similar laserwort
- Lefebvrea camerunensis, synonym of Lefebvrea angustisecta
- Petagnaea gussonei
- Pimpinella tirupatiensis
- Polylophium panjutinii, Panjutin's polylophium
- Seseli intricatum

==== Araliaceae ====
Species

- Brassaiopsis acuminata
- Brassaiopsis kwangsiensis
- Cheirodendron dominii, Domin's club
- Eleutherococcus brachypus
- Eleutherococcus cuspidatus
- Eleutherococcus setulosus
- Eleutherococcus stenophyllus
- Eleutherococcus verticillatus
- Euaraliopsis dumicola syn. Brassaiopsis dumicola
- Heptapleurum albidobracteatum
- Heptapleurum bourdillonii
- Heptapleurum palawanense
- Heptapleurum fastigiatum
- Heptapleurum insigne
- Heptapleurum kontumense
- Heptapleurum multifoliolatum
- Heptapleurum palmiforme
- Heteropanax nitentifolius
- Heteropanax yunnanensis
- Neocussonia lukwangulensis
- Oreopanax corazonensis
- Oreopanax impolitus
- Panax zingiberensis
- Plerandra elegantissima
- Plerandra pachyphylla
- Plerandra sp. "calcicola"
- Plerandra sp. "longistyla"
- Plerandra veitchii
- Polyscias albersiana
- Polyscias dichroostachya
- Polyscias mauritiana
- Polyscias nothisii
- Polyscias quintasii
- Polyscias stuhlmannii
- Polyscias waialealae
- Polyscias waimeae
- Schefflera euthytricha
- Sciodaphyllum brownei

Varieties

- Polyscias sechellarum var. sechellarum

==== Torricelliaceae ====
- Melanophylla modestei

=== Aristolochiales ===
- Aristolochia delavayi
- Aristolochia scytophylla
- Aristolochia tuberosa
- Asarum celsum
- Asarum hatsushimae
- Asarum lutchuense
- Asarum nazeanum
- Asarum trinacriforme
- Saruma henryi

=== Aquifoliales ===
==== Hollies ====
- Ilex arisanensis
- Ilex brachyphylla
- Ilex chengkouensis
- Ilex chuniana
- Ilex dabieshanensis
- Ilex euryoides
- Ilex fengqingensis
- Ilex graciliflora
- Ilex jamaicana
- Ilex longzhouensis
- Ilex oblonga
- Ilex occulta
- Ilex pauciflora
- Ilex peiradena
- Ilex qianlingshanensis
- Ilex rarasanensis
- Ilex shimeica
- Ilex sintenisii, Sintenis' holly
- Ilex syzygiophylla
- Ilex trichocarpa
- Ilex tugitakayamensis
- Ilex uraiensis
- Ilex venulosa
- Ilex wenchowensis
- Ilex wugonshanensis
- Ilex yuiana

==== Stemonuraceae ====
- Gomphandra coi
- Gomphandra conklinii
- Gomphandra donnaiensis
- Gomphandra fusiformis
- Gomphandra javanica
- Gomphandra parviflora
- Gomphandra psilandra
- Gomphandra ultramafiterrestris
- Grisollea thomassetii
- Medusanthera howardii
- Medusanthera inaequalis
- Medusanthera malayana
- Stemonurus corrugatus
- Stemonurus gitingensis
- Stemonurus perobtusus

=== Asterales ===
Species

- Aequatorium asterotrichum
- Aequatorium lepidotum
- Aetheolaena decipiens
- Aetheolaena mochensis
- Aetheolaena subinvolucrata
- Aphanactis barclayae
- Argyranthemum lidii
- Argyranthemum thalassophilum
- Argyroxiphium sandwicense, silversword
- Aristeguietia chimborazensis
- Artemisia granatensis, royal chamomile
- Aster pyrenaeus
- Aster sorrentinii
- Atractylis arbuscula
- Atractylis preauxiana
- Badilloa atrescens
- Barnadesia ciliata
- Bartlettina campii
- Bidens cosmoides
- Bidens valida
- Brachyglottis arborescens, Three Kings rangiora
- Calea huigrensis
- Carlina diae
- Centaurea borjae
- Centaurea gymnocarpa
- Centaurea hajastana, Hayastanian centaury
- Centaurea horrida
- Centaurea princeps
- Centaurea rhizocalathium, root-headed centaury
- Centaurea woronowii, Woronow's centaury
- Centauropsis decaryi
- Centauropsis perrieri
- Cheirolophus falcisectus
- Cheirolophus ghomerythus
- Cheirolophus junonianus
- Cheirolophus massonianus
- Chuquiraga arcuata
- Cineraria longipes
- Cirsium albowianum, Albov's thistle
- Cirsium czerkessicum, Cherkessian thistle
- Clibadium rhytidophyllum
- Clibadium websteri
- Cousinia araxena, Araxian cousinia
- Cousinia gabrieljaniae, Gabrielyan's cousinia
- Cousinia iljinii, Ilyin's cousinia
- Cousinia lomakinii, Lomakin's cousinia
- Cousinia takhtajanii, Takhtadjan's cousinia
- Crepis crocifolia
- Crepis granatensis
- Critoniopsis dorrii
- Critoniopsis yamboyensis
- Cronquistianthus rosei
- Cuatrecasanthus flexipappus
- Dendrophorbium amplexicaule
- Dendrophorbium angelense
- Dendrophorbium gesnerifolium
- Dendrosenecio cheranganiensis
- Diplostephium crypteriophyllum
- Diplostephium juniperinum
- Diplostephium ramiglabrum
- Dubautia arborea, tree dubautia
- Dubautia microcephala, small-head dubautia
- Echinops sintenisii, Sintensis' globe thistle
- Elaphandra paucipunctata
- Erigeron frigidus
- Erigeron incertus, hairy daisy
- Erigeron pauper
- Erigeron schalbusi, Shalbusian fleabane
- Ethulia scheffleri
- Gamochaeta antarctica, Antarctic cudweed
- Gnaphalium ecuadorense
- Gnaphalium sepositum
- Grosvenoria campii
- Guevaria loxensis
- Gynoxys campii
- Gynoxys chagalensis
- Gynoxys ignaciana
- Gynoxys validifolia
- Haplopappus albicans
- Helichrysum monogynum
- Hieracium adenobrachion, glandular-branched hawkweed
- Hieracium caucasiense, Caucasian hawkweed
- Idiopappus saloyensis
- Joseanthus chimborazensis
- Joseanthus cuatrecasasii
- Jungia crenatifolia
- Jungia glandulifera
- Jurinea galushkoi, Galushko's jurinea
- Jurinea iljinii, Iljin's jurinea
- Jurinea praetermissa, neglected jurinea
- Jurinea sosnowskyi, Sosnovsky's jurinea
- Kaunia pachanoi
- Kingianthus paradoxus
- Koanophyllon panamensis
- Lactuca watsoniana
- Lamprachaenium microcephalum
- Lepidaploa violiceps
- Libinhania fontinalis
- Libinhania hegerensis
- Lipotriche tithonioides, Simandou daisy
- Llerasia fuliginea
- Loricaria azuayensis
- Lycoseris eggersii
- Mikania millei
- Mikania pulverulenta
- Monactis anderssonii
- Monticalia angustifolia
- Mtonia glandulifera
- Munnozia canarensis
- Mutisia hieronymi
- Mutisia lehmannii
- Mutisia microneura
- Nastanthus falklandicus, false plantain
- Olearia hectori, deciduous tree daisy
- Olearia polita
- Oritrophium tergoalbum
- Pappobolus argenteus
- Pentacalia cazaletii
- Pentacalia gibbiflora
- Pentacalia pailasensis
- Pentacalia riotintis
- Petrobium arboreum, whitewood
- Picris willkommii
- Podospermum grigoraschvilii, Grigorashvili's salsify
- Podospermum schischkinii, Shishkin's salsify
- Prenanthes amabilis
- Psephellus appendicigerus, appendage-bearing centaury
- Psephellus boissieri, Boissier's psephellus
- Psephellus cronquistii, Cronquists's cornflower
- Psephellus debedicus, Debedian cornflower
- Psephellus galushkoi, Galushko's psephellus
- Psephellus geghamensis, Geghamian cornflower
- Psephellus manakyanii, Manakyan's cornflower
- Psephellus pecho
- Psephellus ruprechtii, Ruprecht's centaury
- Psephellus straminicephalus, straw-coloured-headed centaury
- Psephellus taochius
- Psephellus troitzkyi, Troitsky's psephellus
- Psephellus zangezuri, Zangezurian cornflower
- Pseudogynoxys engleri
- Pulicaria aromatica
- Pulicaria dioscorides
- Remya kauaiensis
- Scalesia cordata, heart-leafed scalesia
- Scalesia microcephala
- Scorzonera safievii, Safiev's salsify
- Senecio elodes
- Stemmacantha cynaroides
- Stenopadus andicola
- Stevia anisostemma
- Sventenia bupleuroides
- Talamancalia fosbergii, synonym of Lomanthus fosbergii
- Tanacetum ptarmiciflorum
- Tolpis glabrescens
- Tragopogon armeniacus, Armenian salsify
- Tragopogon meskheticus, Meskhetian goat's beard
- Tripleurospermum fissurale, fissural tripleurospermum
- Verbesina barclayae
- Verbesina ecuatoriana
- Verbesina harlingii
- Verbesina minuticeps
- Verbesina villonacoensis
- Vernonia duvigneaudii
- Vernonia nonoensis
- Wagenitzia lancifolia
- Wilkesia gymnoxiphium
- Xenophyllum acerosum

Subspecies

- Bidens micrantha subsp. kalealaha
- Dubautia knudsenii subsp. filiformis, Knudsen's dubautia
- Dubautia knudsenii subsp. knudsenii
- Dubautia knudsenii subsp. nagatae
- Senecio lagascanus subsp. lusitanicus

Varieties

- Scalesia microcephala var. cordifolia
- Scalesia microcephala var. microcephala
- Urbananthus critoniformis var. pubescens

=== Austrobaileyales ===
==== Schisandraceae ====
- Illicium griffithii
- Illicium hottense
- Illicium wardii

=== Boraginales ===
==== Boraginaceae ====
Species

- Anchusa crispa
- Bourreria velutina
- Echium pininana
- Echium valentinum
- Ehretia glandulosissima
- Lithodora nitida
- Myosotis daralaghezica, Daralagezian forget-me-not
- Myosotis rehsteineri
- Onosma obtusifolia, amblyophyllous goldendrop
- Onosma tornensis
- Solenanthus albanicus
- Symphytum hajastanum, Hajastanian comfrey
- Symphytum podcumicum, Podkumian comfrey

Subspecies

- Echium decaisnei subsp. purpuriense
- Echium onosmifolium subsp. spectabile
- Omphalodes littoralis subsp. gallaecica

==== Cordiaceae ====
- Cordia correae
- Cordia protracta
- Cordia rosei

=== Brassicales ===
There are 30 species in Capparales assessed as endangered.

==== Brassicaceae ====
- Alyssum artvinense, Artvinian alyssum
- Barbarea grandiflora, large-flowered barbarea
- Barbarea lepuznica
- Barbarea lutea, Artvinian barbarea
- Brassica hilarionis
- Cochlearia polonica, Polish scurvy-grass
- Coincya rupestris
- Crambe armena, Armenian sea-kale
- Crambe laevigata
- Crambe microcarpa
- Crambe pritzelii
- Crambe scoparia
- Draba aretioides
- Draba extensa
- Erysimum leptocarpum, thin-fruited treacle mustard
- Erysimum wagifii, treacle mustard
- Eudema nubigena
- Isatis karjaginii, Karyagin's woad
- Lepidium filicaule
- Lepidium serra
- Nasturtium africanum
- Nesocrambe socotrana
- Phlebolobium maclovianum, Falkland rock-cress
- Sinapidendron frutescens
- Sinapidendron sempervivifolium
- Sisymbrella dentata

==== Capparaceae ====
- Capparis heterophylla
- Capparis pachyphylla
- Podandrogyne brevipedunculata
- Podandrogyne jamesonii
- Steriphoma urbani

=== Buxales ===
==== Buxaceae ====
- Buxus nyasica
- Styloceras kunthianum

=== Campanulales ===
==== Campanulaceae ====
Species

- Azorina vidalii
- Burmeistera anderssonii
- Burmeistera cuyujensis
- Burmeistera domingensis
- Burmeistera holm-nielsenii
- Burmeistera huacamayensis
- Burmeistera ignimontis
- Burmeistera oyacachensis
- Burmeistera resupinata
- Campanula autraniana, Autran's campanula
- Campanula choruhensis, Choruhian bellflower
- Campanula kachethica, Kakhetian bellflower
- Campanula massalskyi, Massalsky's campanula
- Campanula songutica, Songutian campanula
- Centropogon aequatorialis
- Centropogon azuayensis
- Centropogon balslevii
- Centropogon chiltasonensis
- Centropogon chontalensis
- Centropogon comosus
- Centropogon erythraeus
- Centropogon hartwegii
- Centropogon heteropilis
- Centropogon hirtiflorus
- Centropogon medusa
- Centropogon occultus
- Centropogon parviflorus
- Centropogon phoeniceus
- Centropogon rimbachii
- Centropogon rubiginosus
- Centropogon steinii
- Centropogon steyermarkii
- Centropogon ursinus
- Centropogon zamorensis
- Clermontia calophylla, lava clermontia
- Clermontia drepanomorpha, Kohala clermontia
- Clermontia lindseyana
- Clermontia samuelii
- Clermontia tuberculata, Haleakala clermontia
- Clermontia waimeae
- Cyanea copelandii
- Cyanea koolauensis
- Hanabusaya asiatica
- Jasione lusitanica
- Jasione mansanetiana
- Lobelia collina
- Lobelia subpubera
- Lysipomia aretioides
- Lysipomia bilineata
- Lysipomia crassomarginata
- Lysipomia cuspidata
- Lysipomia cylindrocarpa
- Lysipomia laricina
- Lysipomia lehmannii
- Lysipomia rhizomata
- Lysipomia sparrei
- Lysipomia speciosa
- Lysipomia tubulosa
- Lysipomia vitreola
- Musschia wollastonii
- Siphocampylus asplundii
- Siphocampylus ecuadoriensis
- Siphocampylus fruticosus
- Siphocampylus furax
- Siphocampylus lucidus
- Siphocampylus rostratus
- Siphocampylus rupestris
- Wahlenbergia ericoidella

Subspecies

- Clermontia arborescens subsp. arborescens
- Cyanea copelandii subsp. haleakalaensis
- Cyanea macrostegia subsp. gibsonii
- Wahlenbergia pulchella subsp. laurentii
- Wahlenbergia pulchella subsp. michelii

=== Canellales ===
==== Canellaceae ====
- Cinnamodendron axillare
- Cinnamodendron ekmanii
- Cinnamodendron tenuifolium

==== Winteraceae ====
- Drimys confertifolia
- Takhtajania perrieri
- Zygogynum oligostigma
- Zygogynum tanyostigma

=== Caryophyllales ===
There are 214 species and one subspecies in the order Caryophyllales assessed as endangered.

==== Aizoaceae ====
- Delosperma gautengense

==== Amaranthaceae ====
- Achyranthes mutica, blunt chaff flower
- Achyropsis filifolia
- Alternanthera nesiotes
- Atriplex lanfrancoi, Maltese cliff-orache
- Charpentiera elliptica
- Cyathula fernando-poensis
- Eokochia saxicola
- Irenella chrysotricha
- Nototrichium humile, synonym of Achyranthes humilis
- Psilotrichum aphyllum

==== Cactus ====
Species

- Ariocarpus agavoides, Tamaulipas living rock cactus
- Ariocarpus bravoanus
- Ariocarpus scaphirostris
- Arrojadoa eriocaulis
- Arrojadoa multiflora
- Arthrocereus glaziovii
- Austrocactus spiniflorus
- Brasilicereus phaeacanthus
- Cephalocereus senilis, old man cactus
- Cereus mirabella
- Cipocereus crassisepalus
- Cipocereus laniflorus
- Cleistocactus jajoanus
- Cleistocactus longiserpens
- Cleistocactus sulcifer
- Cleistocactus winteri
- Coleocephalocereus buxbaumianus
- Coleocephalocereus goebelianus
- Coleocephalocereus pluricostatus
- Coleocephalocereus uebelmanniorum
- Consolea spinosissima
- Copiapoa cinerascens
- Copiapoa fiedleriana
- Copiapoa grandiflora
- Copiapoa hypogaea
- Copiapoa serpentisulcata
- Copiapoa solaris
- Copiapoa taltalensis
- Corryocactus ayacuchoensis
- Corryocactus brachypetalus
- Corryocactus pulquinensis
- Corryocactus tarijensis
- Corynopuntia bulbispina
- Coryphantha maiz-tablasensis
- Coryphantha pulleineana
- Coryphantha pycnacantha
- Dendrocereus nudiflorus
- Discocactus diersianus
- Discocactus ferricola
- Discocactus pseudoinsignis
- Disocactus biformis
- Disocactus eichlamii
- Disocactus macdougallii
- Echinocactus grusonii, synonym of Kroenleinia grusonii, golden barrel
- Echinocereus barthelowanus
- Echinocereus chisosensis, Chisos Mountain hedgehog cactus
- Echinocereus leucanthus
- Echinocereus schmollii, lamb's tail cactus
- Echinocereus sciurus
- Echinopsis angelesiae
- Echinopsis bolligeriana
- Echinopsis caulescens
- Echinopsis coquimbana
- Echinopsis hertrichiana
- Echinopsis oligotricha
- Echinopsis pampana
- Epiphyllum lepidocarpum
- Eriosyce aspillagae
- Eriosyce calderana
- Eriosyce crispa
- Eriosyce esmeraldana
- Eriosyce iquiquensis
- Eriosyce occulta
- Eriosyce simulans
- Eriosyce sociabilis
- Eriosyce umadeave
- Escobaria cubensis, Holguín dwarf cactus
- Ferocactus chrysacanthus
- Ferocactus flavovirens
- Ferocactus haematacanthus
- Frailea buenekeri
- Frailea curvispina
- Frailea fulviseta
- Frailea mammifera
- Gymnocalycium amerhauseri
- Gymnocalycium denudatum
- Gymnocalycium horstii
- Gymnocalycium oenanthemum
- Hatiora cylindrica
- Hatiora herminiae
- Hylocereus calcaratus
- Kadenicarpus pseudomacrochele
- Leptocereus arboreus
- Leptocereus quadricostatus, sebucan
- Maihueniopsis minuta
- Mammillaria albicoma
- Mammillaria aureilanata
- Mammillaria capensis
- Mammillaria coahuilensis
- Mammillaria crucigera
- Mammillaria eichlamii
- Mammillaria gasseriana
- Mammillaria hernandezii
- Mammillaria johnstonii
- Mammillaria mathildae
- Mammillaria melaleuca
- Mammillaria microhelia
- Mammillaria parkinsonii
- Mammillaria pectinifera
- Mammillaria peninsularis
- Mammillaria rettigiana – synonym of Mammillaria mercadensis
- Mammillaria schumannii
- Mammillaria supertexta
- Mammillaria surculosa
- Mammillaria zublerae
- Matucana tuberculata
- Matucana weberbaueri
- Melocactus andinus
- Melocactus azureus
- Melocactus deinacanthus
- Melocactus glaucescens
- Melocactus lanssensianus
- Melocactus matanzanus, dwarf Turk's cap cactus
- Melocactus stramineus
- Micranthocereus auriazureus
- Micranthocereus hofackerianus
- Micranthocereus polyanthus
- Micranthocereus violaciflorus
- Obregonia denegrii, artichoke cactus
- Opuntia megarrhiza
- Opuntia pachyrrhiza
- Oroya peruviana
- Pachycereus gaumeri
- Parodia allosiphon
- Parodia gaucha
- Parodia hausteiniana
- Parodia horstii
- Parodia leninghausii
- Parodia magnifica
- Parodia mueller-melchersii
- Parodia muricata
- Parodia nigrispina
- Parodia penicillata
- Parodia rudibuenekeri
- Parodia stockingeri
- Parodia tenuicylindrica
- Parodia warasii
- Pediocactus paradinei, park pincushion-cactus
- Peniocereus lazaro-cardenasii
- Peniocereus macdougallii
- Pereskia aureiflora
- Pfeiffera micrantha
- Pilosocereus magnificus
- Pilosocereus multicostatus
- Pilosocereus quadricentralis
- Pilosocereus tillianus
- Pilosocereus ulei
- Pseudorhipsalis alata
- Pygmaeocereus bieblii
- Rebutia albipectinata
- Rebutia glomeriseta
- Rebutia krugerae
- Rhipsalis crispata
- Rhipsalis dissimilis
- Rhipsalis pacheco-leonis
- Schlumbergera kautskyi
- Schlumbergera lutea syn. Hatiora epiphylloides
- Schlumbergera orssichiana
- Schlumbergera russelliana
- Sclerocactus nyensis, Nye County fish-hook cactus
- Selenicereus atropilosus
- Siccobaccatus insigniflorus
- Stenocereus chrysocarpus
- Stenocereus humilis
- Stenocereus martinezii
- Tacinga estevesii
- Tacinga subcylindrica
- Tephrocactus bonnieae
- Thelocactus hastifer
- Turbinicarpus horripilus
- Turbinicarpus subterraneus
- Uebelmannia gummifera
- Uebelmannia pectinifera
- Weberbauerocereus cephalomacrostibas
- Weberocereus imitans
- Weberocereus trichophorus
- Yavia cryptocarpa

Subspecies

- Ariocarpus bravoanus subsp. hintonii

==== Caryophyllaceae ====
- Cerastium sventenii
- Dianthus charadzeae, Kharadze's pink
- Dianthus diutinus
- Dianthus grossheimii, Grossheim's pink
- Drymaria stellarioides
- Gypsophila papillosa
- Gypsophila steupii, Steup's chalk plant
- Moehringia fontqueri
- Moehringia tommasinii
- Polycarpaea garuensis
- Polycarpaea rheophytica
- Schiedea lychnoides
- Schiedea spergulina
- Silene diclinis
- Silene fernandezii
- Silene hifacensis
- Silene holzmannii
- Silene orphanidis
- Silene sennenii

==== Didiereaceae ====
- Alluaudia montagnacii

==== Droseraceae ====
- Aldrovanda vesiculosa, waterwheel

==== Nepenthaceae ====
- Nepenthes adnata
- Nepenthes bellii
- Nepenthes boschiana
- Nepenthes burbidgeae
- Nepenthes chaniana
- Nepenthes gracillima
- Nepenthes khasiana
- Nepenthes klossii
- Nepenthes mapuluensis
- Nepenthes masoalensis
- Nepenthes murudensis
- Nepenthes palawanensis
- Nepenthes paniculata
- Nepenthes rajah
- Nepenthes talangensis
- Nepenthes tenuis
- Nepenthes truncata

==== Nyctaginaceae ====
- Neea acuminatissima
- Neea amplexicaulis
- Neea ekmanii
- Pisonia ekmani
- Pisonia sechellarum
- Pisonia wagneriana

==== Polygonaceae ====
- Atraphaxis muschketowi, shrubby buckwheat
- Calligonum matteianum
- Calligonum molle
- Coccoloba proctorii
- Coccoloba rugosa
- Rumex algeriensis
- Rumex bithynicus

==== Portulacaceae ====
- Portulaca samhaensis
- Portulaca sclerocarpa
- Portulaca sedifolia

=== Celastrales ===
There are 43 species in the order Celastrales assessed as endangered.

==== Celastraceae ====
- Euonymus assamicus, synonym of Euonymus frigidus
- Euonymus paniculatus, synonym of Euonymus laxiflorus
- Euonymus serratifolius
- Euonymus thwaitesii, synonym of Euonymus dichotomus
- Loeseneriella camerunica
- Maytenus cymosa, Caribbean mayten
- Maytenus jamesonii
- Microtropis densiflora
- Monteverdia manabiensis, synonym of Maytenus manabiensis
- Salvadoropsis arenicola
- Sarawakodendron filamentosum
- Tetrasiphon jamaicensis
- Thyrsosalacia pararacemosa
- Wimmeria acuminata
- Wimmeria chiapensis
- Wimmeria montana

==== Dichapetalaceae ====
- Dichapetalum potamophilum

=== Cornales ===
- Cardiandra amamiohsimensis
- Deutzia paniculata
- Deutzia yaeyamensis
- Hydrostachys angustisecta
- Kirengeshoma palmata

=== Crossosomatales ===
- Dalrympelea calciphila

=== Cucurbitales ===
==== Begoniaceae ====
- Begonia aeranthos
- Begonia bonus-henricus
- Begonia furfuracea
- Begonia hainanensis
- Begonia harlingii
- Begonia hitchcockii
- Begonia ludwigii
- Begonia pelargoniiflora
- Begonia peltatifolia
- Begonia pseudoviola
- Begonia rubromarginata
- Begonia samhaensis
- Begonia serotina
- Begonia triramosa
- Begonia tropaeolifolia
- Begonia valvata

=== Dipsacales ===
Species

- Centranthus trinervis
- Lonicera paradoxa
- Scabiosa adzharica, Adjarian scabious
- Succisella andreae-molinae
- Tetradoxa omeiensis, synonym of Adoxa omeiensis
- Valeriana secunda

Subspecies

- Sambucus nigra subsp. palmensis

Varieties

- Viburnum villosum var. subdentatum

=== Dilleniales ===
- Hibbertia margaretae
- Hibbertia tontoutensis

=== Ericales ===
==== Actinidiaceae ====
- Actinidia stellatopilosa
- Saurauia aguaricana
- Saurauia mexiae
- Saurauia seibertii
- Saurauia serrata
- Saurauia striata
- Saurauia tambensis

==== Ebenaceae ====
- Diospyros acuta
- Diospyros alatella
- Diospyros alboflavescens
- Diospyros attenuata
- Diospyros crumenata
- Diospyros ebenoides
- Diospyros esmereg
- Diospyros gillisonii
- Diospyros havilandii
- Diospyros hillebrandii
- Diospyros insularis
- Diospyros korupensis
- Diospyros kotoensis
- Diospyros magogoana
- Diospyros mun
- Diospyros nummulariifolia
- Diospyros onanae
- Diospyros oppositifolia
- Diospyros parabuxifolia
- Diospyros philippinensis
- Diospyros shimbaensis

==== Ericaceae ====
- Lyonia elliptica
- Lyonia maestrensis
- Vaccinium whitmorei

==== Lecythidaceae ====
Species

- Allantoma pauciramosa
- Barringtonia sarawakensis
- Brazzeia longipedicellata
- Cariniana ianeirensis
- Couratari atrovinosa
- Couratari pyramidata
- Eschweilera jacquelyniae
- Eschweilera rabeliana
- Foetidia delphinensis
- Foetidia dracaenoides
- Foetidia pterocarpa
- Foetidia sambiranensis
- Grias longirachis
- Gustavia dodsonii
- Gustavia excelsa
- Gustavia gracillima
- Gustavia longepetiolata
- Gustavia monocaulis
- Gustavia petiolata
- Gustavia serrata
- Lecythis prancei
- Rhaptopetalum belingense
- Rhaptopetalum depressum
- Rhaptopetalum sessilifolium

Subspecies

- Eschweilera piresii subsp. piresii

==== Marcgraviaceae ====
- Marcgravia grandifolia
- Marcgraviastrum sodiroi

==== Myrsinaceae ====
- Ardisia amplexicaulis
- Ardisia blatteri
- Ardisia brittonii
- Ardisia colonensis
- Ardisia dukei
- Ardisia eugenioides
- Ardisia glomerata
- Ardisia koupensis
- Ardisia microcalyx
- Ardisia rufa
- Ardisia scheryi
- Ardisia sonchifolia
- Geissanthus fallenae
- Geissanthus pinchinchana
- Maesa velutina
- Myrsine knudsenii
- Myrsine linearifolia
- Myrsine petiolata
- Parathesis vulgata
- Rapanea striata

==== Primulaceae ====
- Cyclamen libanoticum
- Primula palinuri

==== Sapotaceae ====
- Chrysophyllum azaguieanum
- Chrysophyllum imperiale
- Chrysophyllum lanatum
- Chrysophyllum subspinosum
- Chrysophyllum wilsonii
- Isonandra borneensis
- Isonandra stocksii
- Isonandra villosa
- Leptostylis gatopensis
- Lucuma capacifolia
- Madhuca bourdillonii
- Madhuca brochidodroma
- Madhuca calcicola
- Madhuca daemonica
- Madhuca diplostemon
- Madhuca elmeri
- Madhuca erythrophylla
- Madhuca fusca
- Madhuca microphylla
- Madhuca montana
- Madhuca multinervia
- Madhuca neriifolia
- Madhuca primoplagensis
- Manilkara bella
- Manilkara dardanoi
- Manilkara decrescens
- Manilkara elata
- Manilkara excisa
- Manilkara kanosiensis
- Manilkara longifolia
- Manilkara mayarensis
- Manilkara multifida
- Manilkara nicholsonii
- Micropholis emarginata
- Micropholis retusa
- Micropholis submarginalis
- Mimusops penduliflora
- Neolemonniera clitandrifolia
- Palaquium canaliculatum
- Palaquium crassifolium
- Palaquium elegans
- Palaquium ravii
- Palaquium stipulare
- Palaquium vexillatum
- Payena lamii
- Pouteria amapaensis
- Pouteria andarahiensis
- Pouteria bracteata
- Pouteria brevensis
- Pouteria brevipedicellata
- Pouteria brevipetiolata
- Pouteria butyrocarpa
- Pouteria coelomatica
- Pouteria contermina
- Pouteria danikeri
- Pouteria decussata
- Pouteria exstaminodia
- Pouteria fulva
- Pouteria hotteana
- Pouteria juruana
- Pouteria kaalaensis
- Pouteria latianthera
- Pouteria macahensis
- Pouteria minima
- Pouteria moaensis
- Pouteria oxypetala
- Pouteria pallida
- Pouteria pinifolia
- Pouteria psammophila
- Pouteria rhynchocarpa
- Pouteria tarumanensis
- Pradosia kuhlmannii
- Pycnandra blanchonii
- Sideroxylon angustum
- Sideroxylon excavatum
- Synsepalum subverticillatum
- Synsepalum tsounkpe
- Tieghemella africana
- Tieghemella heckelii, cherry mahogany

==== Sarraceniaceae ====
Subspecies

- Sarracenia rubra subsp. gulfensis
- Sarracenia rubra subsp. jonesii, mountain sweet pitcherplant
- Sarracenia rubra subsp. wherryi

Varieties

- Sarracenia purpurea var. montana, purple pitcherplant

==== Symplocaceae ====
Species

- Symplocos anamallayana
- Symplocos badia
- Symplocos barberi
- Symplocos blancae
- Symplocos breedlovei
- Symplocos carmencitae
- Symplocos globosa, synonym of Symplocos ecuadorica
- Symplocos junghuhnii
- Symplocos nairii
- Symplocos nivea
- Symplocos oligandra
- Symplocos pluribracteata
- Symplocos shilanensis
- Symplocos truncata

Subspecies

- Symplocos pulchra subsp. coriacea

Varieties

- Symplocos diversifolia var. appressa
- Symplocos diversifolia var. diversifolia

==== Theaceae ====
Species

- Adinandra griffithii
- Camellia amplexifolia
- Camellia candida
- Camellia chrysanthoides
- Camellia elongata
- Camellia hongkongensis, Hong Kong camellia
- Camellia huana
- Camellia longipedicellata
- Camellia longzhouensis
- Camellia micrantha
- Camellia parviflora
- Camellia paucipunctata
- Camellia pingguoensis
- Camellia pubifurfuracea
- Camellia szechuanensis
- Camellia tenii
- Camellia tonkinensis
- Camellia xanthochroma
- Eurya rengechiensis
- Freziera dudleyi
- Freziera revoluta
- Freziera smithiana
- Freziera spathulifolia
- Gordonia villosa
- Ternstroemia calycina
- Ternstroemia cleistogama

Varieties

- Cleyera japonica var. grandiflora

=== Fabales ===
Species

- Abrus sambiranensis
- Acacia allenii
- Acacia bifaria
- Acacia brachypoda, western wheatbelt wattle
- Acacia bucheri
- Acacia chrysotricha, Newry golden wattle
- Acacia daemon
- Acacia menabeensis
- Acacia repanda
- Acacia zapatensis
- Acmispon prostratus syn. Lotus nuttallianus, Nuttall's lotus
- Acridocarpus congestus
- Acridocarpus monodii
- Acridocarpus pauciglandulosus
- Acridocarpus scheffleri
- Adenocarpus ombriosus
- Aeschynomene laxiflora
- Afzelia xylocarpa
- Albizia plurijuga
- Albizia suluensis, Zulu albizia
- Amburana cearensis
- Anagyris latifolia
- Aspalathus glabrescens
- Aspalathus macrantha
- Aspalathus psoraleoides
- Aspalathus varians
- Astragalus acetabulosus
- Astragalus alamliensis
- Astragalus altus, tall milkvetch
- Astragalus bidentatus
- Astragalus bobrovii
- Astragalus cuscutae, dodder astragalus
- Astragalus cyri
- Astragalus drupaceus
- Astragalus geminus (replacement name for the illegitimate Astragalus albanicus), Albanian astragalus
- Astragalus maraziensis, Marazinian astragalus
- Astragalus tener, gray slender milkvetch
- Astragalus vardziae, Vardzian astragalus
- Astragalus xiphidium
- Ateleia gummifera
- Baikiaea ghesquiereana
- Baphia obanensis
- Baphia pauloi
- Baphia puguensis
- Baudouinia sollyaeformis
- Bauhinia flagelliflora
- Bauhinia haughtii
- Bauhinia integerrima
- Bauhinia mombassae
- Bauhinia pervilleana
- Bauhinia stenantha
- Bikinia breynei
- Brongniartia guerrerensis
- Brownea santanderensis
- Browneopsis disepala
- Bussea eggelingii
- Cadia pubescens
- Caesalpinia echinata
- Caesalpinia phyllanthoides, creeping bird of paradise
- Calliandra glyphoxylon
- Canavalia kauaiensis
- Cassia artensis
- Cassia fikifiki
- Chadsia longidentata
- Chamaecrista astrochiton
- Chamaecrista brevifolia
- Chamaecrista kolabensis
- Chamaecrista myrophenges
- Chapmannia reghidensis
- Chapmannia tinireana
- Cicer canariense
- Cicer graecum
- Clianthus puniceus, kaka-beak
- Clitoria brachystegia
- Coursetia planipetiolata
- Crotalaria hemsleyi
- Crotalaria mentiens
- Crotalaria oxyphylloides
- Crotalaria yaihsienensis
- Cryptosepalum diphyllum
- Cynometra bourdillonii
- Cynometra cubensis
- Cynometra lukei
- Cynometra travancorica
- Cynometra ulugurensis
- Dalbergia abrahamii
- Dalbergia andapensis
- Dalbergia annamensis
- Dalbergia bariensis
- Dalbergia bathiei
- Dalbergia bojeri
- Dalbergia brachystachya
- Dalbergia cambodiana
- Dalbergia capuronii
- Dalbergia congesta
- Dalbergia davidii
- Dalbergia delphinensis
- Dalbergia erubescens
- Dalbergia glaucocarpa
- Dalbergia gloveri
- Dalbergia hirticalyx
- Dalbergia humbertii
- Dalbergia louvelii
- Dalbergia mammosa
- Dalbergia maritima
- Dalbergia normandii
- Dalbergia oliveri
- Dalbergia peishaensis
- Dalbergia setifera
- Dalbergia suaresensis
- Dalbergia tsaratananensis
- Dalbergia tsiandalana
- Dalbergia urschii
- Dalbergia xerophila
- Dalea chrysophylla
- Delonix pumila
- Delonix velutina
- Derris polyantha
- Desmodium harmsii
- Dialium excelsum
- Dolichos reptans
- Dorycnium spectabile
- Ecuadendron acosta-solisianum
- Elephantorrhiza rangei
- Erythrina ankaranensis
- Erythrina eggersii, cock's-spur
- Erythrophleum fordii
- Genista ancistrocarpa
- Gigasiphon macrosiphon
- Gleditsia rolfei
- Gossweilerodendron balsamiferum
- Humboldtia bourdillonii
- Humboldtia vahliana
- Hymenostegia gracilipes
- Indigofera bemarahaensis
- Indigofera itremoensis
- Indigofera litoralis
- Indigofera peltieri
- Indigofera verruculosa
- Inga arenicola
- Inga bella
- Inga blanchetiana
- Inga bracteifera
- Inga cabelo
- Inga carinata
- Inga exfoliata
- Inga golfodulcensis
- Inga herrerae
- Inga jaunechensis
- Inga jimenezii
- Inga lanceifolia
- Inga latipes
- Inga litoralis
- Inga maritima
- Inga mendoncaei
- Inga mortoniana
- Inga multicaulis
- Inga pedunculata
- Inga platyptera
- Inga sellowiana
- Inga sinacae
- Inga stenophylla
- Inga suberosa
- Inga tenuiloba
- Jacksonia sericea
- Kingiodendron pinnatum
- Korupodendron songweanum
- Lamprolobium grandiflorum
- Lemuropisum edule, lemur's pea
- Leptoderris ledermannii
- Leptoderris macrothyrsa
- Lessertia argentea
- Leucaena involucrata
- Leucaena magnifica
- Leucaena matudae
- Lonchocarpus phlebophyllus
- Lotus callis-viridis
- Lupinus nubigenus
- Maackia taiwanensis
- Machaerium nicaraguense
- Macrolobium pittieri
- Malpighia cauliflora
- Mascagnia haenkeana
- Medicago saxatilis
- Melolobium subspicatum
- Millettia aurea
- Millettia conraui
- Millettia coruscans
- Millettia hitsika
- Millettia laurentii
- Millettia micans
- Millettia nathaliae
- Millettia orientalis
- Millettia taolanaroensis
- Mimosa disperma
- Mimosa longipes
- Mimosa loxensis
- Mimosa polydidyma
- Mimosa ramentacea
- Mimosa setistipula
- Mimosa taimbensis
- Mimosa townsendii
- Monnina haughtii
- Monnina sodiroana
- Mucuna manongarivensis
- Mundulea anceps
- Newtonia erlangeri
- Ophrestia unicostata
- Ormocarpopsis calcicola
- Ormocarpopsis tulearensis
- Ormocarpum klainei
- Ormosia jamaicensis
- Otholobium holosericeum
- Pericopsis elata, African teak
- Phaseolus rosei
- Phylloxylon decipiens
- Phylloxylon perrieri
- Pithecellobium johansenii
- Pithecellobium saxosum
- Pithecellobium stevensonii
- Platylobium alternifolium, Victorian flat-pea
- Platymiscium pleiostachyum
- Polygala urartu, Urartuan milkwort
- Pongamiopsis amygdalina
- Psoralea fascicularis
- Pterandra isthmica
- Pterocarpus santalinus, almug
- Pterocarpus zenkeri
- Pyranthus ambatoana
- Pyranthus monantha
- Sakoanala madagascariensis
- Senna scandens
- Sophora koreensis, Korean necklace-pod
- Sophora saxicola
- Sophora wightii
- Stahlia monosperma
- Stigmaphyllon ecuadorense
- Stigmaphyllon eggersii
- Swainsona recta, small purple-pea
- Swartzia aureosericea
- Swartzia littlei
- Swartzia nuda
- Swartzia robiniifolia
- Tachigali beaurepairei
- Tachigali pilgeriana
- Talbotiella eketensis
- Teline rosmarinifolia
- Tephrosia angustissima, devil's shoestring
- Tephrosia phylloxylon
- Tephrosia retamoides
- Tephrosia subaphylla
- Tephrosia viguieri
- Tessmannia densiflora
- Vicia capreolata
- Zapoteca aculeata
- Zygia steyermarkii

Subspecies

- Bunchosia diphylla subsp. brevisurcularis
- Ceratonia oreothauma subsp. somalensis
- Craibia brevicaudata subsp. burttii
- Inga exalata subsp. umbilicata
- Inga multijuga subsp. aestuariorum
- Leobordea adpressa subsp. leptantha
- Sakoanala villosa subsp. villosa

Varieties

- Acridocarpus alopecurus var. machaeropterus
- Crotalaria laburnoides var. nudicarpa
- Humboldtia unijuga var. unijuga
- Leucaena confertiflora var. adenotheloidea
- Microcharis microcharoides var. latistipulata

=== Fagales ===
==== Betulaceae ====
Species

- Alnus maritima
- Betula megrelica, Megrelian birch
- Ostrya trichocarpa

Varieties

- Betula pendula var. fontqueri
- Betula pendula var. parvibracteata

==== Fagaceae ====
Species

- Castanopsis argentea
- Castanopsis cambodiana
- Castanopsis guinieri
- Castanopsis johorensis
- Castanopsis namdinhensis
- Castanopsis nhatrangensis
- Castanopsis tungurrut
- Castanopsis wilsonii
- Lithocarpus annamitorus
- Lithocarpus areca
- Lithocarpus atjehensis
- Lithocarpus cambodiensis
- Lithocarpus dinhensis
- Lithocarpus dodonaeifolius
- Lithocarpus gougerotae
- Lithocarpus howii
- Lithocarpus kostermansii
- Lithocarpus kozlovii
- Lithocarpus leiophyllus
- Lithocarpus leiostachyus
- Lithocarpus lemeeanus
- Lithocarpus mianningensis
- Lithocarpus oblanceolatus
- Lithocarpus obovatilimbus
- Lithocarpus perakensis
- Lithocarpus platycarpus
- Lithocarpus proboscideus
- Lithocarpus pycnostachys
- Lithocarpus revolutus
- Lithocarpus shinsuiensis
- Lithocarpus sogerensis
- Lithocarpus talangensis
- Lithocarpus touranensis
- Quercus acerifolia, maple-leaved oak
- Quercus arbutifolia
- Quercus asymmetrica
- Quercus × basaseachicensis
- Quercus bambusifolia
- Quercus brandegeei
- Quercus carmenensis, Mexican oak
- Quercus chrysotricha
- Quercus cualensis
- Quercus cupreata, synonym of Quercus xalapensis
- Quercus daimingshanensis
- Quercus delgadoana
- Quercus delicatula
- Quercus devia
- Quercus disciformis
- Quercus diversifolia
- Quercus dumosa
- Quercus edithiae
- Quercus engelmannii
- Quercus flocculenta
- Quercus galeanensis
- Quercus georgiana, Georgia oak
- Quercus havardii, shinnery oak
- Quercus hintonii
- Quercus hirtifolia
- Quercus insignis
- Quercus kinabaluensis
- Quercus kingiana
- Quercus kiukiangensis
- Quercus kotschyana
- Quercus kouangsiensis
- Quercus lenticellata
- Quercus liboensis
- Quercus lobbii
- Quercus lodicosa
- Quercus look
- Quercus macdougallii
- Quercus meavei
- Quercus miquihuanensis
- Quercus nivea
- Quercus nixoniana
- Quercus obconicus, synonym of Quercus hainanica
- Quercus oglethorpensis, Oglethorpe oak
- Quercus pacifica, island scrub oak
- Quercus percoriacea
- Quercus petelotii
- Quercus phanera
- Quercus pontica
- Quercus radiata
- Quercus ramsbottomii
- Quercus runcinatifolia
- Quercus rupestris
- Quercus sagrana
- Quercus steenisii
- Quercus tiaoloshanica
- Quercus tomentella
- Quercus tungmaiensis
- Quercus utilis
- Quercus xanthotricha
- Trigonobalanus doichangensis
- Trigonobalanus excelsa

Varieties

- Quercus parvula var. parvula

==== Juglandaceae ====
- Alfaroa mexicana
- Carya sinensis, Chinese hickory
- Juglans cinerea
- Juglans neotropica
- Juglans pyriformis
- Juglans steyermarkii
- Juglans venezuelensis

==== Myricaceae ====
- Myrica chimanimaniana
- Myrica holdridgeana

==== Nothofagaceae ====
- Nothofagus alessandrii
- Nothofagus baumanniae
- Nothofagus discoidea

=== Garryales ===
- Garrya corvorum
- Garrya mexicana

=== Gentianales ===
==== Apocynaceae ====
Species

- Alstonia annamensis
- Alyxia menglungensis
- Alyxia taiwanensis
- Aspidosperma polyneuron
- Baissea ochrantha
- Cameraria microphylla
- Cerberiopsis neriifolia
- Hunteria ghanensis
- Kibatalia borneensis
- Kibatalia puberula
- Kibatalia stenopetala
- Landolphia uniflora
- Malouetia barbata
- Mandevilla dodsonii
- Mandevilla equatorialis
- Neisosperma sevenetii syn. Ochrosia sevenetii
- Ochrosia borbonica
- Ochrosia haleakalae
- Ochrosia kauaiensis
- Pachypodium baronii
- Parepigynum funingense
- Petchia africana
- Prestonia peregrina
- Prestonia rotundifolia
- Pteralyxia kauaiensis, Kauai pteralyxia
- Tabernaemontana apoda
- Tabernaemontana cumata
- Tabernaemontana muricata
- Tabernaemontana ovalifolia
- Tabernaemontana persicariifolia

Varieties

- Carissa edulis var. sechellensis

==== Asclepiadaceae ====
- Brachystelma exile
- Ceropegia aridicola
- Ceropegia ledermannii
- Cynanchum campii
- Cynanchum chanchanense
- Cynanchum intricatum
- Cynanchum jaramilloi
- Decalepis hamiltonii
- Epistemma decurrens
- Gonolobus campii
- Gymnema khandalense
- Marsdenia exellii
- Matelea chimboracensis
- Matelea honorana
- Metastelma purpurascens
- Pachycarpus medusonema
- Raphionacme caerulea
- Raphionacme keayi
- Secamone schimperiana
- Xysmalobium samoritourei

==== Gentianaceae ====
- Gentianella androsacea
- Gentianella flaviflora
- Gentianella fuscicaulis
- Gentianella gracilis
- Gentianella hirculus
- Gentianella jamesonii
- Gentianella longibarbata
- Gentianella polyantha
- Halenia serpyllifolia

==== Loganiaceae ====
Species

- Geniostoma quadrangulare
- Geniostoma stipulare
- Labordia kaalae
- Labordia lydgatei
- Neuburgia macroloba

Varieties

- Labordia tinifolia var. lanaiensis

==== Rubiaceae ====
Species

- Afrocanthium rondoense
- Arachnothryx fosbergii
- Asperula virgata, rod-shaped woodruff
- Aulacocalyx lujae
- Bikkia kaalaensis
- Bikkia lenormandii
- Blepharidium guatemalense
- Bobea timonioides
- Byrsophyllum tetrandrum
- Canthium sechellense
- Chassalia colorata
- Chassalia euchlora
- Chassalia eurybotrya
- Chassalia grandistipula
- Chassalia tsaratanensis
- Chassalia violacea
- Cinchona anderssonii
- Cinchona asperifolia
- Cinchona hirsuta
- Cinchona mutisii
- Cinchona nitida
- Cinchona rugosa
- Coffea arabica, Arabica coffee
- Coffea bakossii
- Coffea myrtifolia
- Craterispermum microdon
- Cuviera schliebenii
- Dichilanthe zeylanica
- Didymosalpinx callianthus
- Elaeagia uxpanapensis
- Exostema lancifolium
- Gaertnera spicata
- Gaertnera ternifolia
- Gaillonia thymoides
- Galium ecuadoricum
- Galium fosbergii
- Galium viridiflorum
- Gardenia anapetes
- Gardenia grievei
- Glionnetia sericea
- Guettardella sp. 'durisylvatica'
- Hoffmannia ecuatoriana
- Hymenodictyon tsingy
- Ixora calycina
- Ixora lawsoni
- Ixora saulierei
- Joosia aequatoria
- Joosia standleyana
- Kadua cookiana
- Lasianthus tomentosus
- Lasianthus varians
- Leptactina papyrophloea
- Manettia angamarcensis
- Manettia skutchii
- Manettia teresitae
- Mitrostigma barteri
- Nostolachma crassifolia
- Oxyanthus biflorus
- Oxyanthus letouzeyanus
- Oxyanthus strigosus
- Oxyanthus ugandensis
- Palicourea fuchsioides
- Palicourea heilbornii
- Pavetta brachycalyx
- Pavetta lindina
- Pavetta muiriana
- Pentagonia involucrata
- Phialanthus jamaicensis
- Phialanthus revolutus
- Pseudomussaenda mozambicensis
- Psychotria angustata, pink wild coffee
- Psychotria beddomei
- Psychotria clarendonensis
- Psychotria clusioides
- Psychotria densinervia
- Psychotria gardneri
- Psychotria glandulifera
- Psychotria globicephala
- Psychotria grandiflora, large-flowered balsamo
- Psychotria hobdyi, Hobdy's wild-coffee
- Psychotria longipetiolata
- Psychotria macrocarpa
- Psychotria madida
- Psychotria plurivenia
- Psychotria rimbachii
- Psychotria siphonophora
- Psychotria sordida
- Psydrax bridsoniana
- Psydrax ficiformis
- Psydrax pergracilis
- Randia carlosiana
- Rondeletia amplexicaulis
- Rondeletia brachyphylla
- Rondeletia clarendonensis
- Rondeletia dolphinensis
- Rothmannia ebamutensis
- Rustia bilsana
- Rytigynia longipedicellata
- Sabicea xanthotricha
- Saprosma scabrida
- Scolosanthus howardii
- Scolosanthus roulstonii
- Sericanthe toupetou
- Spermacoce capillaris
- Stenostomum aromaticum
- Stenostomum radiatum
- Stilpnophyllum grandifolium
- Suberanthus hincheanus
- Tapiphyllum schliebenii
- Tarenna agumbensis
- Tarenna monosperma
- Tarenna pembensis
- Tricalysia lejolyana

Subspecies

- Leptactina delagoensis subsp. bussei
- Oxyanthus pyriformis subsp. longitubus

Varieties

- Ixora oligantha var. opuloides
- Psychotria nilgiriensis var. astephana

=== Geraniales ===
- Dirachma somalensis
- Erodium paularense
- Geranium exallum
- Impatiens andringitrensis
- Impatiens anovensis
- Impatiens cribbii
- Impatiens etindensis
- Impatiens frithii
- Impatiens gongolana
- Impatiens letouzeyi
- Impatiens obesa
- Impatiens omeiana
- Impatiens pritzelii
- Impatiens wilsoni
- Oxalis chachahuensis
- Oxalis ecuadorensis
- Oxalis pennelliana
- Tropaeolum carchense

=== Icacinales ===
- Casimirella beckii
- Cassinopsis tomentosa
- Mappia insularis
- Pyrenacantha cordicula
- Ryticaryum fasciculatum

=== Lamiales ===
==== Acanthaceae ====
Species

- Acanthus austromontanus
- Angkalanthus oligophylla
- Anisosepalum lewallei
- Anisotes spectabilis
- Anisotes tangensis
- Anisotes ukambensis
- Anisotes umbrosus
- Anisotes zenkeri
- Aphelandra azuayensis
- Aphelandra cinnabarina
- Aphelandra galba
- Aphelandra guayasii
- Aphelandra harlingii
- Aphelandra loxensis
- Aphelandra phaina
- Asystasia linearis
- Asystasia lorata
- Asystasia schliebenii
- Asystasia tanzaniensis
- Barleria amanensis
- Barleria aristata
- Barleria brevituba
- Barleria decaisniana
- Barleria dulcis
- Barleria faulknerae
- Barleria insolita
- Barleria laceratiflora
- Barleria laeta
- Barleria leandrii
- Barleria limnogeton
- Barleria longipes
- Barleria lukei
- Barleria maculata
- Barleria penelopeana
- Barleria perrieri
- Barleria popovii
- Barleria pseudosomalia
- Barleria vollesenii
- Barleria whytei
- Blepharis crinita
- Blepharis ilicifolia
- Blepharis kenyensis
- Blepharis maculata
- Blepharis pusilla
- Blepharis tanzaniensis
- Brachystephanus laxispicatus
- Brachystephanus roseus
- Brillantaisia richardsiae
- Brillantaisia stenopteris
- Cephalophis lukei
- Chlamydocardia subrhomboidea
- Crabbea longipes
- Crossandra cephalostachya
- Crossandra humbertii
- Crossandra isaloensis
- Crossandra nobilis
- Crossandra obanensis
- Crossandra pilosa
- Crossandra poissonii
- Crossandra quadridentata
- Cystacanthus affinis
- Dicliptera cicatricosa
- Dicliptera cordibracteata
- Dicliptera grandiflora
- Dicliptera napierae
- Dischistocalyx champluvieranus
- Duosperma latifolium
- Duosperma porotoense
- Duosperma trachyphyllum
- Dyschoriste kitongaensis
- Dyschoriste nyassica
- Dyschoriste sinica
- Ecbolium benoistii
- Heteradelphia paulojaegeria
- Hygrophila albobracteata
- Hygrophila mediatrix
- Hygrophila richardsiae
- Isoglossa anisophylla
- Isoglossa bondwaensis
- Isoglossa candelabrum
- Isoglossa faulknerae
- Isoglossa oreacanthoides
- Isoglossa variegata
- Isoglossa ventricosa
- Justicia beloperonoides
- Justicia breviracemosa
- Justicia euosmia
- Justicia faulknerae
- Justicia leucoxiphos
- Justicia mariae
- Justicia niassensis
- Justicia obtusicapsula
- Justicia petterssonii
- Justicia pinensis
- Justicia roseobracteata
- Justicia takhinensis
- Justicia telloensis
- Justicia tenuipes
- Kudoacanthus albonervosus
- Lepidagathis madagascariensis
- Lepidagathis mucida
- Lepidagathis plantaginea
- Lepidagathis pseudoaristata
- Mellera congdonii
- Mimulopsis macrantha
- Neuracanthus aculeatus
- Odontonema laxum
- Phaulopsis pulchella
- Physacanthus talbotii
- Podorungia lantzei
- Podorungia serotina
- Pseuderanthemum usambarense
- Sclerochiton preussii
- Staurogyne pseudocapitata
- Staurogyne sichuanica
- Stenandrium thomense
- Stenostephanus asplundii
- Stenostephanus harlingii
- Stenostephanus laxus
- Thunbergia rufescens

Subspecies

- Barleria polhillii subsp. latiloba
- Duosperma longicalyx subsp. magadiense
- Duosperma longicalyx subsp. mkomaziense
- Neuracanthus tephrophyllus subsp. tsavoensis

==== Bignoniaceae ====
- Amphitecna molinae
- Colea colei
- Colea seychellarum
- Ekmanianthe longiflora
- Fernandoa lutea
- Handroanthus serratifolius
- Parmentiera cereifera
- Parmentiera dressleri
- Phyllarthron antongiliense
- Phyllarthron bilabiatum
- Phyllarthron ilicifolium
- Phyllarthron megaphyllum
- Phyllarthron suarezense
- Spirotecoma holguinensis
- Synapsis ilicifolia
- Tabebuia elongata
- Tecomella undulata

==== Buddlejaceae ====
- Buddleja ibarrensis

==== Gesneriaceae ====
Species

- Columnea atahualpae
- Columnea flexiflora
- Columnea schimpffii
- Corytoplectus cutucuensis
- Cremosperma auriculatum
- Cyrtandra cyaneoides
- Cyrtandra giffardii, Giffard's cyrtandra
- Cyrtandra heinrichii
- Cyrtandra oenobarba
- Damrongia fulva
- Drymonia ecuadorensis
- Drymonia laciniosa
- Drymonia rhodoloma
- Drymonia utuanensis
- Gasteranthus bilsaensis
- Gasteranthus carinatus
- Gasteranthus crispus
- Gasteranthus macrocalyx
- Gasteranthus mutabilis
- Gasteranthus orientandinus
- Gasteranthus perennis
- Gasteranthus tenellus
- Gasteranthus ternatus
- Gasteranthus timidus
- Henckelia smitinandii
- Monopyle sodiroana
- Monopyle stenoloba
- Oreocharis hirsuta
- Paraboea amplifolia
- Paraboea argentea
- Paraboea chiangdaoensis
- Paraboea glabra
- Paraboea glabrescens
- Paraboea longipetiolata
- Paraboea patens
- Paraboea rabilii
- Paradrymonia binata
- Paradrymonia hypocyrta
- Paradrymonia lacera
- Pearcea bilabiata
- Pearcea gracilis
- Pearcea intermedia
- Reldia calcarata
- Saintpaulia goetzeana
- Saintpaulia inconspicua
- Saintpaulia shumensis
- Streptocarpus albus
- Streptocarpus bambuseti
- Streptocarpus bullatus
- Streptocarpus gonjaensis
- Streptocarpus heckmannianus
- Streptocarpus stomandrus
- Streptocarpus subscandens
- Tetraphyllum roseum

Subspecies

- Saintpaulia ionantha subsp. nitida
- Saintpaulia ionantha subsp. orbicularis
- Saintpaulia ionantha subsp. velutina
- Streptocarpus albus subsp. albus
- Streptocarpus albus subsp. edwardsii
- Streptocarpus heckmannianus subsp. gracilis
- Streptocarpus heckmannianus subsp. heckmannianus

==== Lamiaceae ====
- Achyrospermum seychellarum
- Aegiphila lopez-palacii
- Aegiphila monticola
- Aegiphila schimpffii
- Clinopodium libanoticum, Lebanon savory
- Hyptis florida
- Hyptis pseudoglauca
- Micromeria leucantha
- Micromeria madagascariensis
- Micromeria taygetea
- Nepeta alaghezi, Alaghezian catmint
- Oxera balansae
- Platostoma glomerulatum
- Plectranthus linearifolius
- Plectranthus ombrophilus
- Plectranthus orbicularis
- Plectranthus platyphyllus
- Plectranthus scaposus
- Plectranthus strangulatus
- Rosmarinus tomentosus
- Salvia ecuadorensis
- Salvia loxensis
- Salvia peregrina
- Salvia unguella
- Sideritis reverchonii
- Stachys oligantha
- Tectona grandis, teak
- Tetradenia clementiana
- Tetradenia falafa
- Teucrium lepicephalum
- Tinnea mirabilis
- Vitex cooperi
- Vitex evoluta
- Vitex gaumeri, fiddlewood
- Vitex kuylenii
- Vitex lehmbachii

==== Lentibulariaceae ====
- Genlisea angolensis
- Pinguicula nevadensis
- Utricularia cecilii

==== Linderniaceae ====
- Lindernia manilaliana
- Lindernia minima

==== Oleaceae ====
Species

- Abeliophyllum distichum, white forsythia
- Chionanthus adamsii
- Chionanthus balgooyanus
- Chionanthus caymanensis
- Chionanthus linocieroides
- Chionanthus polycephalus
- Forsythia ovata
- Fraxinus chiisanensis
- Ligustrum microcarpum
- Picconia azorica
- Priogymnanthus apertus, Francisco

Varieties

- Chionanthus caymanensis var. longipetala
- Chionanthus leprocarpa var. courtallensis

==== Plantaginaceae ====
- Callitriche mathezii
- Callitriche transvolgensis
- Plantago algarbiensis
- Plantago moorei, Moore's plantain

==== Scrophulariaceae ====
- Ameroglossum pernambucense
- Antirrhinum lopesianum
- Antirrhinum subbaeticum
- Calceolaria australis
- Calceolaria bentae
- Calceolaria commutata
- Calceolaria frondosa
- Calceolaria gossypina
- Calceolaria grandiflora
- Calceolaria lavandulifolia
- Calceolaria martinezii
- Calceolaria obtusa
- Calceolaria odontophylla
- Calceolaria platyzyga
- Calceolaria semiconnata
- Isoplexis isabelliana, cresta de gallo
- Linaria tonzigii
- Scrophularia eriocalyx
- Veronica transcaucasica, spicate pseudolysimachion

==== Stilbaceae ====
- Nuxia ambrensis

==== Verbenaceae ====
- Aloysia dodsoniorum
- Xolocotzia asperifolia

=== Laurales ===
There are 67 species, two subspecies, and two varieties in the order Laurales assessed as endangered.

==== Gomortegaceae ====
- Gomortega keule

==== Hernandiaceae ====
Species

- Hernandia catalpifolia
- Hernandia lychnifera
- Hernandia mascarenensis

Subspecies

- Hernandia moerenhoutiana subsp. elliptica

==== Lauraceae ====
Species

- Actinodaphne amabilis
- Actinodaphne areolata
- Actinodaphne bicolor
- Actinodaphne brassii
- Actinodaphne fragilis
- Actinodaphne glaucina
- Actinodaphne hirsuta
- Actinodaphne macroptera
- Actinodaphne microphylla
- Actinodaphne molochina
- Actinodaphne obscurinervia
- Actinodaphne paotingensis
- Actinodaphne pauciflora
- Actinodaphne perlucida
- Actinodaphne salicina
- Actinodaphne samarensis
- Actinodaphne semengohensis
- Actinodaphne shendurunii
- Actinodaphne soepadmoi
- Actinodaphne spathulifolia
- Actinodaphne tsaii
- Aiouea alainii
- Aiouea benthamiana
- Aiouea bracteata
- Aiouea breedlovei
- Aiouea cinnamomoidea
- Aiouea erythropus
- Aiouea glossophylla
- Aiouea impressa
- Aiouea lehmannii
- Aiouea longipes
- Aiouea parvissima, synonym of Damburneya parvissima
- Aiouea salicifolia
- Aiouea subsessilis
- Alseodaphne albifrons
- Alseodaphne birmanica
- Alseodaphne dura
- Alseodaphne garciniicarpa
- Alseodaphne glauciflora
- Alseodaphne habrotricha
- Alseodaphne macrantha
- Alseodaphne philippinensis
- Alseodaphne rhododendropsis
- Alseodaphne siamensis
- Alseodaphne tonkinensis
- Alseodaphnopsis hainanensis
- Alseodaphnopsis lanuginosa
- Alseodaphnopsis sichourensis
- Andea fulvescens
- Aniba ferrea
- Aniba heterotepala
- Aniba permollis
- Aniba pilosa
- Aniba rosodora
- Aniba santalodora
- Aspidostemon andohahelensis
- Aspidostemon antongilensis
- Aspidostemon apiculatus
- Aspidostemon conoideus
- Aspidostemon dolichocarpus
- Aspidostemon fungiformis
- Aspidostemon glandulosus
- Aspidostemon humbertianus
- Aspidostemon longipedicellatus
- Aspidostemon lucens
- Aspidostemon microphyllus
- Aspidostemon parvifolius
- Aspidostemon percoriaceus
- Aspidostemon perrieri
- Beilschmiedia alata
- Beilschmiedia anay
- Beilschmiedia balansae
- Beilschmiedia bangkae
- Beilschmiedia baotingensis
- Beilschmiedia barensis
- Beilschmiedia berteroana
- Beilschmiedia bolavenensis
- Beilschmiedia brachystachys
- Beilschmiedia brachythyrsa
- Beilschmiedia brevifolia
- Beilschmiedia calcitranthera
- Beilschmiedia cinnamomea
- Beilschmiedia congolana
- Beilschmiedia corbisieri
- Beilschmiedia crassa
- Beilschmiedia cylindrica
- Beilschmiedia dilmyana
- Beilschmiedia elegantissima
- Beilschmiedia fasciata
- Beilschmiedia fluminensis
- Beilschmiedia furfuracea
- Beilschmiedia gigantocarpa
- Beilschmiedia glandulosa
- Beilschmiedia glaucoides
- Beilschmiedia glomerata
- Beilschmiedia grandibracteata
- Beilschmiedia gynotrochioides
- Beilschmiedia henghsienensis
- Beilschmiedia hexanthera
- Beilschmiedia hutchinsoniana
- Beilschmiedia immersinervis
- Beilschmiedia insularum
- Beilschmiedia lanatella
- Beilschmiedia lebrunii
- Beilschmiedia letouzeyi
- Beilschmiedia linocieroides
- Beilschmiedia longepetiolata
- Beilschmiedia macropoda
- Beilschmiedia manantlanensis
- Beilschmiedia mayumbensis
- Beilschmiedia membranacea
- Beilschmiedia michelsonii
- Beilschmiedia morobensis
- Beilschmiedia myrciifolia
- Beilschmiedia myrmecophila
- Beilschmiedia neocaledonica
- Beilschmiedia nitida
- Beilschmiedia novae-britanniae
- Beilschmiedia obconica
- Beilschmiedia oblonga
- Beilschmiedia obovata
- Beilschmiedia obscurinervia
- Beilschmiedia olivacea
- Beilschmiedia paulocordata
- Beilschmiedia phoebeopsis
- Beilschmiedia podagrica
- Beilschmiedia poilanei
- Beilschmiedia preussii
- Beilschmiedia preussioides
- Beilschmiedia purpurascens
- Beilschmiedia rigida
- Beilschmiedia rugosa
- Beilschmiedia schmitzii
- Beilschmiedia scortechinii
- Beilschmiedia sericans
- Beilschmiedia sessilifolia
- Beilschmiedia sikkimensis
- Beilschmiedia staudtii
- Beilschmiedia steyermarkii
- Beilschmiedia tilaranensis
- Beilschmiedia tirunelvelica
- Beilschmiedia tisseranti
- Beilschmiedia versicolor
- Beilschmiedia vidalii
- Beilschmiedia villosa
- Beilschmiedia wilczekii
- Caryodaphnopsis bilocellata
- Caryodaphnopsis cogolloi
- Caryodaphnopsis laotica
- Caryodaphnopsis metallica
- Caryodaphnopsis parviflora
- Cinnadenia liyuyingii
- Cinnamomum agasthyamalayanum
- Cinnamomum anacardium
- Cinnamomum arfakense
- Cinnamomum austroyunnanense
- Cinnamomum balansae
- Cinnamomum birmanicum
- Cinnamomum bishnupadae
- Cinnamomum bladenense
- Cinnamomum blandfordii
- Cinnamomum bonii
- Cinnamomum brevipedunculatum
- Cinnamomum calciphilum
- Cinnamomum caudiferum
- Cinnamomum cebuense
- Cinnamomum chartophyllum
- Cinnamomum citriodorum
- Cinnamomum crenulicupulum
- Cinnamomum culilaban
- Cinnamomum damhaense
- Cinnamomum ebaloi
- Cinnamomum ellipticifolium
- Cinnamomum filipedicellatum
- Cinnamomum frodinii
- Cinnamomum gamblei
- Cinnamomum goaense
- Cinnamomum hatschbachii
- Cinnamomum helferi
- Cinnamomum heyneanum
- Cinnamomum inconspicuum
- Cinnamomum kalbaricum
- Cinnamomum keralaense
- Cinnamomum kerangas
- Cinnamomum kinabaluense
- Cinnamomum kostermannii
- Cinnamomum kunstleri
- Cinnamomum kwangtungense
- Cinnamomum longipetiolatum
- Cinnamomum loureiroi
- Cinnamomum lucens
- Cinnamomum mairei
- Cinnamomum melliodorum
- Cinnamomum mendozae
- Cinnamomum mollifolium
- Cinnamomum myrianthum
- Cinnamomum nanophyllum
- Cinnamomum panayense
- Cinnamomum percoriaceum
- Cinnamomum perrottetii
- Cinnamomum petelotii
- Cinnamomum pilosum
- Cinnamomum pittosporoides
- Cinnamomum polderi
- Cinnamomum porphyrospermum
- Cinnamomum puberulum
- Cinnamomum purpureaum
- Cinnamomum riparium
- Cinnamomum rivulorum
- Cinnamomum rosiflorum
- Cinnamomum rupestre
- Cinnamomum sandkuhlii
- Cinnamomum sinharajaense
- Cinnamomum soegengii
- Cinnamomum subaveniopsis
- Cinnamomum sulavesianum
- Cinnamomum suvrae
- Cinnamomum tavoyanum
- Cinnamomum vacciniifolium
- Cinnamomum wightii
- Cryptocarya acuminata
- Cryptocarya albifrons
- Cryptocarya ambrensis
- Cryptocarya anamalayana
- Cryptocarya apamifolia
- Cryptocarya argyrophylla
- Cryptocarya balakrishnanii
- Cryptocarya bernhardiensis
- Cryptocarya botelhensis
- Cryptocarya brachythyrsa
- Cryptocarya brevipes
- Cryptocarya bullata
- Cryptocarya burckeana
- Cryptocarya calandoi
- Cryptocarya calelanensis
- Cryptocarya celebica
- Cryptocarya constricta
- Cryptocarya cordata
- Cryptocarya cordifolia
- Cryptocarya crassinerviopsis
- Cryptocarya dealbata
- Cryptocarya dekae
- Cryptocarya edanoii
- Cryptocarya elegans
- Cryptocarya elongata
- Cryptocarya engleriana
- Cryptocarya euphlebia
- Cryptocarya filicifolia
- Cryptocarya fluminensis
- Cryptocarya forbesii
- Cryptocarya fulva
- Cryptocarya fuscopilosa
- Cryptocarya glauciphylla
- Cryptocarya globosa
- Cryptocarya hartleyi
- Cryptocarya helicina
- Cryptocarya kajewskii
- Cryptocarya kwangtungensis
- Cryptocarya lanceolata
- Cryptocarya lanuginosa
- Cryptocarya loheri
- Cryptocarya lucida
- Cryptocarya lyoniifolia
- Cryptocarya maculata
- Cryptocarya magnifolia
- Cryptocarya malayana
- Cryptocarya mannii
- Cryptocarya membranacea
- Cryptocarya microcos
- Cryptocarya multiflora
- Cryptocarya myrcioides
- Cryptocarya nana
- Cryptocarya natalensis
- Cryptocarya nothofagetorum
- Cryptocarya oblonga
- Cryptocarya oblongata
- Cryptocarya oligophlebia
- Cryptocarya ovatocaudata
- Cryptocarya palawanensis
- Cryptocarya palmerensis
- Cryptocarya parallelinervia
- Cryptocarya parinarioides
- Cryptocarya perareolata
- Cryptocarya pergracilis
- Cryptocarya perlucida
- Cryptocarya petiolata
- Cryptocarya praetervisa
- Cryptocarya pullenii
- Cryptocarya pustulata
- Cryptocarya ramosii
- Cryptocarya renicarpa
- Cryptocarya resinosa
- Cryptocarya revoluta
- Cryptocarya sleumeri
- Cryptocarya splendens
- Cryptocarya subbullata
- Cryptocarya subfalcata
- Cryptocarya sulcata
- Cryptocarya sumatrana
- Cryptocarya umbonata
- Cryptocarya vaccinioides
- Cryptocarya velloziana
- Cryptocarya verrucosa
- Cryptocarya vidalii
- Cryptocarya villarii
- Cryptocarya williwilliana
- Cryptocarya wilsonii
- Cryptocarya xylophylla
- Cryptocarya yunnanensis
- Cryptocarya zamboangensis
- Damburneya leucocome
- Damburneya longipetiolata
- Damburneya matudae
- Damburneya mirafloris
- Dehaasia gigantocarpa
- Dehaasia kerrii
- Dehaasia subcaesia
- Dehaasia titanophylla
- Dehaasia velutinosa
- Endiandra aneityensis
- Endiandra carrii
- Endiandra cyphellophora
- Endiandra dolichocarpa
- Endiandra engleriana
- Endiandra formicaria
- Endiandra gemopsis
- Endiandra hainanensis
- Endiandra holttumii
- Endiandra inaequitepala
- Endiandra inopinata
- Endiandra invasiorum
- Endiandra limnophila
- Endiandra magnilimba
- Endiandra microphylla
- Endiandra oblonga
- Endiandra pilosa
- Endiandra rhizophoretum
- Endiandra schlechteri
- Endiandra sleumeri
- Endiandra solomonensis
- Endiandra spathulata
- Endiandra teschneri
- Endiandra trichotosa
- Endiandra versteeghii
- Endiandra whitmorei
- Endiandra wongawallanensis
- Endlicheria cocuirey
- Endlicheria coriacea
- Hexapora curtisii
- Licaria aureosericea
- Licaria brenesii
- Licaria caribaea
- Licaria carinata
- Licaria cogolloi
- Licaria dolichantha
- Licaria filiformis
- Licaria glaberrima
- Licaria multiflora
- Licaria multinervis
- Licaria phymatosa
- Licaria sericea
- Licaria trinervis
- Licaria velutina
- Lindera wrayi
- Litsea alba
- Litsea andreana
- Litsea assamica
- Litsea baruringensis
- Litsea beddomei
- Litsea bernhardensis
- Litsea biflora
- Litsea brachypoda
- Litsea brassii
- Litsea citronella
- Litsea claviflora
- Litsea clemensii
- Litsea complanata
- Litsea crenata
- Litsea curtisii
- Litsea formanii
- Litsea forstenii
- Litsea fulvosericea
- Litsea helferi
- Litsea honghoensis
- Litsea hunanensis
- Litsea imbricata
- Litsea kakkachensis
- Litsea khasyana
- Litsea kwangsiensis
- Litsea leiantha
- Litsea longipes
- Litsea mekongensis
- Litsea membranifolia
- Litsea nemoralis
- Litsea nhatrangensis
- Litsea oblongifolia
- Litsea oligophlebia
- Litsea orocola
- Litsea pentaflora
- Litsea perglabra
- Litsea pseudoumbellata
- Litsea rangoonensis
- Litsea rehderiana
- Litsea salmonea
- Litsea seemannii
- Litsea segregata
- Litsea sinoglobosa
- Litsea solomonensis
- Litsea staintonii
- Litsea suboppositifolia
- Litsea szemaois
- Litsea taronensis
- Litsea trichophylla
- Litsea vanoverberghii
- Litsea versteeghii
- Litsea viridis
- Litsea whiteana
- Litsea whitfordii
- Machilus cambodianus
- Machilus cochinchinensis
- Machilus glabrophylla
- Machilus grandibracteata
- Machilus kingii
- Machilus lohuiensis
- Machilus nakaoi
- Machilus nanmu
- Machilus parapauhoi
- Machilus pseudokobu
- Machilus verruculosa
- Mespilodaphne morae
- Mezilaurus campaucola
- Mezilaurus decurrens
- Mezilaurus duckei
- Mezilaurus micrantha
- Nectandra astyla
- Nectandra barbellata
- Nectandra brittonii
- Nectandra fragrans
- Nectandra herrerae
- Nectandra heterotricha
- Nectandra hirtella
- Nectandra hypoleuca
- Nectandra micranthera
- Nectandra parviflora
- Nectandra pseudocotea
- Nectandra ruforamula
- Nectandra subbullata
- Nectandra utilis
- Nectandra wurdackii
- Nectandra yarinensis
- Neocinnamomum atjehense
- Neolitsea boninensis
- Neolitsea kedahensis
- Neolitsea mannii
- Neolitsea megacarpa
- Neolitsea teschneriana
- Nothaphoebe poilanei
- Ocotea adamantina
- Ocotea albigemma
- Ocotea alpina
- Ocotea ambrensis
- Ocotea architectorum
- Ocotea arenaria
- Ocotea atacta
- Ocotea athroanthes
- Ocotea barbatula
- Ocotea basicordatifolia
- Ocotea bullata
- Ocotea calliscypha
- Ocotea candidovillosa
- Ocotea cardinalis
- Ocotea caudatifolia
- Ocotea cicatricosa
- Ocotea ciliata
- Ocotea contrerasii
- Ocotea crassifolia
- Ocotea cryptocarpa
- Ocotea cryptocaryoides
- Ocotea darcyi
- Ocotea dielsiana
- Ocotea domatiata
- Ocotea douradensis
- Ocotea estrellensis
- Ocotea faucherei
- Ocotea felix
- Ocotea fistulosa
- Ocotea fragrantissima
- Ocotea gentryi
- Ocotea hammeliana
- Ocotea hirtostyla
- Ocotea humbertii
- Ocotea involuta
- Ocotea itatiaiae
- Ocotea jacquinii
- Ocotea jelskii
- Ocotea kostermanniana
- Ocotea lindbergii
- Ocotea madagascariensis
- Ocotea magnifica
- Ocotea marcescens
- Ocotea marumbiensis
- Ocotea matudae
- Ocotea micrantha
- Ocotea minutiflora
- Ocotea moaensis
- Ocotea munacensis
- Ocotea nigrita
- Ocotea nobilis
- Ocotea odorata
- Ocotea ottoschmidtii
- Ocotea pachypoda
- Ocotea paranaensis
- Ocotea parvula
- Ocotea patula
- Ocotea perforata
- Ocotea pharomachrosorum
- Ocotea pittieri
- Ocotea pluridomatiata
- Ocotea ramosissima
- Ocotea revolutifolia
- Ocotea rigens
- Ocotea rohweri
- Ocotea rufescens
- Ocotea rufovestita
- Ocotea salvinii
- Ocotea sambiranensis
- Ocotea sarcodes
- Ocotea serrana
- Ocotea sessiliflora
- Ocotea solomonii
- Ocotea spanantha
- Ocotea staminoides
- Ocotea stenophylla
- Ocotea stuebelii
- Ocotea tomentosa
- Ocotea tonii
- Ocotea trichantha
- Ocotea trinidadensis
- Ocotea umbrina
- Ocotea uxpanapana
- Ocotea vaginans
- Persea albida
- Persea albiramea
- Persea bilocularis
- Persea boldufolia
- Persea borbonia
- Persea brevipes
- Persea campii
- Persea chamissonis
- Persea cinerascens
- Persea conferta
- Persea croizatii
- Persea fusca
- Persea glabra
- Persea laevifolia
- Persea longipes
- Persea obscura
- Persea pajonalis
- Persea pallescens
- Persea pedunculosa
- Persea rufescens
- Persea schiedeana
- Phoebe bootanica
- Phoebe clemensii
- Phoebe glabrifolia
- Phoebe mollis
- Phoebe petelotii
- Phoebe yaiensis
- Phyllostemonodaphne geminiflora
- Pleurothyrium amapaense
- Pleurothyrium giganthum
- Pleurothyrium guindonii
- Pleurothyrium hexaglandulosum
- Pleurothyrium immersum
- Pleurothyrium oblongum
- Pleurothyrium obovatum
- Pleurothyrium steyermarkianum
- Pleurothyrium westphaliae
- Potameia capuronii
- Potameia micrantha
- Potameia resonjo
- Potameia siamensis
- Potameia tomentella
- Rhodostemonodaphne anomala
- Rhodostemonodaphne antioquensis
- Rhodostemonodaphne capixabensis
- Rhodostemonodaphne cyclops
- Rhodostemonodaphne longiflora
- Rhodostemonodaphne tumucumaquensis
- Sextonia pubescens
- Syndiclis chinensis
- Syndiclis kwangsiensis
- Urbanodendron bahiense
- Williamodendron glaucophyllum
- Williamodendron spectabile

Subspecies

- Apollonias barbujana subsp. ceballosi

Varieties

- Actinodaphne campanulata var. obtusa
- Litsea pierrei var. szemois

==== Monimiaceae ====
- Hedycarya perbracteolata
- Kibara oligocarpella
- Matthaea heterophylla
- Matthaea pubescens
- Mollinedia dolichotricha
- Mollinedia glaziovii
- Mollinedia heteranthera
- Mollinedia howeana
- Mollinedia longicuspidata
- Mollinedia maxima
- Mollinedia pallida
- Mollinedia stenophylla
- Tambourissa alaticarpa
- Tambourissa beanjadensis
- Tambourissa bosseri
- Tambourissa decaryana
- Tambourissa gracilis
- Tambourissa lastelliana
- Tambourissa masoalensis
- Tambourissa nitida
- Tambourissa perrieri
- Tambourissa rakotozafyi

==== Siparunaceae ====
- Siparuna campii
- Siparuna eggersii

=== Linales ===
Species

- Erythroxylum ruizii
- Erythroxylum socotranum
- Humiriastrum melanocarpum
- Vantanea depleta
- Vantanea magdalenensis

Varieties

- Allantospermum borneense var. rostratrum

=== Magnoliales ===
There are 166 species and six subspecies in the order Magnoliales assessed as endangered.

==== Annonaceae ====
Species

- Alphonsea tsangyanensis
- Annickia kummerae
- Annona angustifolia
- Annona bicolor
- Annona crassivenia
- Annona cristalensis
- Annona cubensis
- Annona gardneri
- Annona havanensis
- Annona macrocalyx
- Annona manabiensis
- Annona neoecuadorensis
- Annona nipensis
- Annona oleifolia
- Annona palmeri
- Annona parviflora
- Annona punicifolia
- Annona rufinervis
- Anonidium letestui
- Artabotrys darainensis
- Artabotrys rupestris
- Asimina tetramera, four-petal pawpaw
- Asteranthe lutea
- Bocagea viridis
- Cremastosperma alticola
- Cremastosperma antioquense
- Cremastosperma bullatum
- Cremastosperma cenepense
- Cremastosperma chococola
- Cremastosperma dolichocarpum
- Cremastosperma longipes
- Cremastosperma macrocarpum
- Cremastosperma magdalenae
- Cremastosperma pacificum
- Cremastosperma stenophyllum
- Cremastosperma westrae
- Cymbopetalum euneurum
- Cymbopetalum gracile
- Cymbopetalum hintonii
- Cymbopetalum sanchezii
- Cymbopetalum schunkei
- Cymbopetalum steyermarkii
- Cymbopetalum tessmannii
- Dasymaschalon yunnanense
- Desmopsis cauliflora
- Desmopsis colombiana
- Desmopsis dolichopetala
- Desmopsis dubia
- Desmopsis hondurensis
- Desmopsis humilis
- Desmopsis neglecta
- Desmopsis talamancana
- Desmopsis uxpanapensis
- Disepalum aciculare
- Drepananthus crassipetalus
- Drepananthus minahassae
- Drepananthus samarensis
- Duguetia aberrans
- Duguetia caniflora
- Duguetia dilabens
- Duguetia duckei
- Duguetia magnolioidea
- Duguetia microphylla
- Duguetia nitida
- Duguetia oligocarpa
- Duguetia peruviana
- Duguetia rotundifolia
- Duguetia sancticaroli
- Duguetia scottmorii
- Duguetia sooretamae
- Duguetia subcordata
- Duguetia tuberculata
- Duguetia venezuelana
- Fenerivia heteropetala
- Fenerivia madagascariensis
- Fissistigma cupreonitens
- Goniothalamus acehensis
- Goniothalamus catanduanensis
- Goniothalamus cheliensis
- Goniothalamus costulatus
- Goniothalamus dewildei
- Goniothalamus epiphyticus
- Goniothalamus griffithii
- Goniothalamus kostermansii
- Goniothalamus lancifolius
- Goniothalamus loerzingii
- Goniothalamus longistaminus
- Goniothalamus magnificus
- Goniothalamus majestatis
- Goniothalamus miquelianus
- Goniothalamus obtusifolius
- Goniothalamus palawanensis
- Goniothalamus rostellatus
- Goniothalamus salicinus
- Goniothalamus simonsii
- Goniothalamus wightii
- Greenwayodendron usambaricum
- Guatteria allenii
- Guatteria hispida
- Guatteria jefensis
- Guatteria latifolia
- Guatteria pseudoferruginea
- Guatteria pudica
- Guatteria revoluta
- Guatteria rostrata
- Guatteria stenocarpa
- Guatteria talamancana
- Guatteria turrialbana
- Hexalobus bussei
- Hornschuchia cauliflora
- Hornschuchia leptandra
- Hornschuchia lianarum
- Hornschuchia obliqua
- Hornschuchia santosii
- Huberantha decora
- Huberantha keraudreniae
- Huberantha multistamina
- Huberantha pendula
- Huberantha tanganyikensis
- Huberantha verdcourtii
- Isolona humbertiana
- Isolona letestui
- Isolona linearis
- Isolona pleurocarpa
- Klarobelia megalocarpa
- Klarobelia rocioae
- Lukea triciae
- Malmea obovata
- Malmea surinamensis
- Meiogyne caudata
- Miliusa tirunelvelica
- Mischogyne congensis
- Mischogyne gabonensis
- Mischogyne iddii
- Mitrephora basilanensis
- Mitrephora cagayanensis
- Mitrephora endertii
- Mitrephora ferruginea
- Mitrephora macrocarpa
- Mitrephora multifolia
- Mitrephora obtusa
- Mitrephora pallens
- Mitrephora pictiflora
- Mitrephora samarensis
- Mitrephora simeuluensis
- Mitrephora weberi
- Mitrephora williamsii
- Monanthotaxis dictyoneura
- Monanthotaxis dielsiana
- Monanthotaxis discolor
- Monanthotaxis discrepantinervia
- Monanthotaxis elegans
- Monanthotaxis faulknerae
- Monodora carolinae
- Monodora hastipetala
- Monoon amischocarpum
- Monoon barnesii
- Monoon liukiuense
- Monoon mindanaense
- Monoon salomonicum
- Monoon shendurunii
- Monoon zamboangaense
- Mosannona pacifica
- Orophea leytensis
- Orophea megalophylla
- Orophea thomsonii
- Orophea wenzelii
- Oxandra macrophylla
- Oxandra surinamensis
- Phoenicanthus coriacea
- Piptostigma longepilosum
- Piptostigma submontanum
- Polyalthia luzonensis
- Polyalthia mindorensis
- Polyalthia oblonga
- Polyalthia rufescens
- Polyalthia tipuliflora
- Polyalthia venosa
- Polyceratocarpus askhambryan-iringae
- Polyceratocarpus scheffleri
- Popowia beddomeana
- Pseudoxandra angustifolia
- Pseudoxandra atrata
- Pseudoxandra papillosa
- Pseudoxandra spiritus-sancti
- Pseudoxandra vallicola
- Pseuduvaria calliura
- Pseuduvaria galeata
- Pseuduvaria luzoniensis
- Pseuduvaria mindorensis
- Pseuduvaria multiovulata
- Pseuduvaria obliqua
- Pseuduvaria phuyensis
- Pseuduvaria unguiculata
- Sanrafaelia ruffonammari
- Sapranthus hirsutus
- Sapranthus isae
- Tetrameranthus pachycarpus
- Toussaintia orientalis
- Toussaintia patriciae
- Tridimeris chiapensis
- Tridimeris hahniana
- Trigynaea axilliflora
- Trigynaea oblongifolia
- Unonopsis aurantiaca
- Unonopsis macrocarpa
- Unonopsis renatoi
- Unonopsis riedeliana
- Unonopsis stevensii
- Uvaria ambongoensis
- Uvaria amplexicaulis
- Uvaria dependens
- Uvaria faulknerae
- Uvaria kweichowensis, synonym of Uvaria macclurei
- Uvaria leandrii
- Uvaria pandensis
- Uvariodendron gorgonis
- Uvariodendron mbagoi
- Uvariodendron oligocarpum
- Uvariodendron pycnophyllum
- Uvariodendron usambarense
- Uvariopsis bisexualis
- Uvariopsis korupensis
- Uvariopsis lovettiana
- Uvariopsis submontana
- Wuodendron praecox
- Xylopia ambanjensis
- Xylopia atlantica
- Xylopia calva
- Xylopia danguyella
- Xylopia decorticans
- Xylopia densiflora
- Xylopia dielsii
- Xylopia dinklagei
- Xylopia ekmanii
- Xylopia fananehanensis
- Xylopia flexuosa
- Xylopia lamii
- Xylopia lastelliana
- Xylopia longicaudata
- Xylopia lukei
- Xylopia madagascariensis
- Xylopia mwasumbii
- Xylopia panamensis
- Xylopia paniculata
- Xylopia pittieri
- Xylopia sahafariensis
- Xylopia sericolampra
- Xylopia surinamensis
- Xylopia tanganyikensis
- Xylopia tenuipetala
- Xylopia torrei

Subspecies

- Greenwayodendron suaveolens subsp. usambaricum

==== Magnoliaceae ====
Species

- Magnolia alejandrae
- Magnolia allenii
- Magnolia angustioblonga
- Magnolia arcabucoana
- Magnolia archilana
- Magnolia argyrothricha
- Magnolia aromatica
- Magnolia bidoupensis
- Magnolia boliviana
- Magnolia brasiliensis
- Magnolia calophylla
- Magnolia caricifragrans
- Magnolia cattienensis
- Magnolia chocoensis
- Magnolia cochranei
- Magnolia coriacea
- Magnolia crassipes
- Magnolia dawsoniana
- Magnolia decastroi
- Magnolia decidua
- Magnolia dixonii
- Magnolia enepeceana
- Magnolia frontinoensis
- Magnolia gentryi
- Magnolia georgii
- Magnolia gilbertoi
- Magnolia guanacastensis
- Magnolia guatapensis
- Magnolia guerrerensis
- Magnolia hamorii
- Magnolia henaoi
- Magnolia hernandezii
- Magnolia inbioana
- Magnolia irwiniana
- Magnolia jaenensis
- Magnolia jaliscana
- Magnolia javieri
- Magnolia juninensis
- Magnolia kachirachirai
- Magnolia kichuana
- Magnolia krusei
- Magnolia lacei
- Magnolia lenticellata
- Magnolia llanganatensis
- Magnolia lotungensis
- Magnolia lucida
- Magnolia madidiensis
- Magnolia mahechae
- Magnolia manuensis
- Magnolia mercedesiarum
- Magnolia minor
- Magnolia mixteca
- Magnolia morii
- Magnolia nana
- Magnolia napoensis
- Magnolia neillii
- Magnolia neomagnifolia
- Magnolia nuevoleonensis
- Magnolia oaxacensis
- Magnolia odoratissima
- Magnolia officinalis
- Magnolia pacifica
- Magnolia palandana
- Magnolia pallescens
- Magnolia pastazaensis
- Magnolia patungensis
- Magnolia pealiana
- Magnolia pedrazae
- Magnolia perezfarrerae
- Magnolia pilocarpa
- Magnolia platyphylla
- Magnolia portoricensis
- Magnolia ptaritepuiana
- Magnolia pubescens
- Magnolia pugana
- Magnolia quetzal
- Magnolia resupinatifolia
- Magnolia rostrata
- Magnolia rufibarbata
- Magnolia rzedowskiana
- Magnolia santanderiana
- Magnolia sharpii
- Magnolia shiluensis
- Magnolia shuarorum
- Magnolia silvioi
- Magnolia sinostellata
- Magnolia sirindhorniae
- Magnolia splendens
- Magnolia stellata, star magnolia
- Magnolia striatifolia
- Magnolia sulawesiana
- Magnolia tamaulipana
- Magnolia urraoensis
- Magnolia vazquezii
- Magnolia ventii
- Magnolia viridipetala
- Magnolia vovidesii
- Magnolia wetteri
- Magnolia wilsonii
- Magnolia xanthantha
- Magnolia yantzazana
- Magnolia yarumalensis, purple turkey
- Magnolia zoquepopolucae

Subspecies

- Magnolia cubensis subsp. cacuminicola
- Magnolia cubensis subsp. cubensis
- Magnolia cubensis subsp. turquinensis

==== Myristicaceae ====
Species

- Bicuiba oleifera
- Compsoneura anoriensis
- Doyleanthus arillata
- Horsfieldia ampla
- Horsfieldia ampliformis
- Horsfieldia clavata
- Horsfieldia crux-melitensis
- Horsfieldia obscurinervia
- Horsfieldia pachyrachis
- Horsfieldia pandurifolia, synonym of Endocomia macrocoma subsp. prainii
- Horsfieldia ralunensis
- Horsfieldia squamulosa
- Horsfieldia triandra
- Horsfieldia urceolata
- Horsfieldia valida
- Iryanthera campinae
- Knema celebica
- Knema emmae
- Knema longepilosa
- Knema mamillata
- Knema matanensis
- Knema pubiflora
- Knema steenisii
- Mauloutchia capuronii
- Mauloutchia coriacea
- Mauloutchia echinocarpa
- Mauloutchia heckelii
- Mauloutchia sambiranensis
- Myristica alba
- Myristica cerifera
- Myristica cylindrocarpa
- Myristica dasycarpa
- Myristica fasciculata
- Myristica filipes
- Myristica guillauminiana
- Myristica incredibilis
- Myristica inundata
- Myristica laevis
- Myristica longepetiolata
- Myristica nana
- Myristica olivacea
- Myristica ornata
- Myristica ovicarpa
- Myristica psilocarpa
- Myristica pubicarpa
- Myristica pygmaea
- Myristica rosselensis
- Myristica sinclairii
- Myristica teysmannii
- Virola amistadensis
- Virola bicuhyba
- Virola crebrinervia

Subspecies

- Myristica beddomei subsp. sphaerocarpa
- Myristica beddomei subsp. ustulata

=== Malpighiales ===
==== Calophyllaceae ====
Species

- Calophyllum aureobrunnescens
- Calophyllum aureum
- Calophyllum brachyphyllum
- Calophyllum collinum
- Calophyllum cucullatum
- Calophyllum elegans
- Calophyllum enervosum
- Calophyllum fibrosum
- Calophyllum glaucescens
- Calophyllum grandiflorum
- Calophyllum heterophyllum
- Calophyllum insularum
- Calophyllum laxiflorum
- Calophyllum lingulatum
- Calophyllum mukunense
- Calophyllum persimile
- Calophyllum robustum
- Calophyllum stipitatum
- Calophyllum streimannii
- Calophyllum subsessile
- Calophyllum trapezifolium
- Calophyllum vernicosum
- Calophyllum waliense
- Caraipa balbinensis
- Kielmeyera bifaria
- Kielmeyera elata
- Kielmeyera fatimae
- Kielmeyera marauensis
- Kielmeyera occhioniana
- Kielmeyera rizziniana
- Kielmeyera rufotomentosa
- Mammea eugenioides
- Mammea glaucifolia
- Mammea grandifolia
- Mammea papyracea
- Mammea pseudoprotorhus
- Mammea sanguinea
- Mammea usambarensis
- Mammea veimauriensis
- Marila nitida

==== Chrysobalanaceae ====
- Atuna indica
- Couepia belemii
- Couepia bondarii
- Couepia exflexa
- Couepia hallwachsiae
- Couepia insignis
- Couepia janzenii
- Couepia leitaofilhoi
- Couepia longipetiolata
- Dactyladenia cinerea
- Dactyladenia globosa
- Dactyladenia hirsuta
- Dactyladenia jongkindii
- Dactyladenia laevis
- Dactyladenia mannii
- Dactyladenia ndjoleensis
- Dactyladenia smeathmannii
- Geobalanus retifolius
- Hirtella aequatoriensis
- Hirtella angustissima
- Hirtella confertiflora
- Hirtella enneandra
- Hirtella floribunda
- Hirtella glaziovii
- Hirtella juruenensis
- Hirtella kuhlmannii
- Hirtella margae
- Hirtella papillata
- Hirtella parviunguis
- Hirtella pauciflora
- Hirtella prancei
- Hirtella revillae
- Hunga cordata
- Hunga guillauminii
- Hunga myrsinoides
- Hunga novoguineensis
- Hymenopus adolphoduckei
- Hymenopus arachicarpa
- Hymenopus costaricensis
- Leptobalanus maguirei
- Leptobalanus stevensii
- Leptobalanus turbinatus
- Licania arianeae
- Licania belemii
- Licania condoriensis
- Licania cymosa
- Licania fanshawei
- Licania indurata
- Licania jimenezii
- Licania lamentanda
- Licania naviculistipula
- Licania pittieri
- Licania tepuiensis
- Licania tocantina
- Magnistipula conrauana
- Magnistipula cuneatifolia
- Moquilea cariae
- Moquilea cecidiophora
- Moquilea corniculata
- Moquilea filomenoi
- Moquilea gonzalezii
- Moquilea longicuspidata
- Moquilea salicifolia
- Parinari alvimii

==== Clusiaceae ====
Species

- Allanblackia kimbiliensis
- Chrysochlamys goudotii
- Clusia aripoensis
- Clusia burchellii
- Clusia caicedoi
- Clusia calimae
- Clusia carinata
- Clusia diamantina
- Clusia duidae
- Clusia glauca
- Clusia kanukuana
- Clusia mirandensis
- Clusia modesta
- Clusia mutica
- Clusia nubium
- Clusia parvifolia
- Clusia plumieri
- Clusia polyandra
- Clusia riedeliana
- Clusia sandiensis
- Clusia schomburgkii
- Clusia steyermarkii
- Clusia stylosa
- Clusia ternstroemioides
- Clusia tocuchensis
- Clusia verapazensis
- Garcinia albuquerquei
- Garcinia ambrensis
- Garcinia apetala
- Garcinia bicolorata
- Garcinia cerasifer
- Garcinia cochinchinensis
- Garcinia crassiflora
- Garcinia hessii
- Garcinia ituman
- Garcinia jaweri
- Garcinia kingii, synonym of Garcinia kurzii
- Garcinia linii
- Garcinia luzoniensis
- Garcinia madagascariensis
- Garcinia martinii
- Garcinia minahassensis
- Garcinia mindanaensis
- Garcinia moseleyana
- Garcinia parvula
- Garcinia paucinervis
- Garcinia rhizophoroides
- Garcinia rubroechinata
- Garcinia semseii
- Garcinia sulphurea
- Garcinia thouvenotii
- Garcinia thwaitesii
- Garcinia tsimatimia
- Garcinia urschii
- Garcinia wightii
- Garcinia zeylanica
- Lorostemon coelhoi
- Symphonia oligantha
- Tovomita iaspidis
- Tovomita salimenae

Varieties

- Clusia havetioides var. pauciflora

==== Euphorbiaceae ====
Species

- Acalypha schimpffii
- Acidocroton gentryi
- Argythamnia argentea
- Baloghia anisomera
- Baloghia pininsularis
- Bernardia trelawniensis
- Bocquillonia arborea
- Bocquillonia castaneifolia
- Bocquillonia longipes
- Cleidiocarpon laurinum
- Cnidoscolus matosii
- Cnidoscolus rangel
- Croton alienus
- Croton cordatulus
- Croton eggersii
- Croton fraseri
- Croton lehmannii
- Croton pavonis
- Croton rivinifolius
- Dimorphocalyx beddomei
- Drypetes andamanica
- Drypetes magnistipula
- Drypetes porteri
- Drypetes travancoria
- Euphorbia abdelkuri
- Euphorbia alcicornis
- Euphorbia angustiflora
- Euphorbia ankaranae
- Euphorbia ankarensis
- Euphorbia aristata, bearded spurge
- Euphorbia bisglobosa
- Euphorbia brachyphylla
- Euphorbia croizatii
- Euphorbia cylindrifolia
- Euphorbia decaryi
- Euphorbia decorsei
- Euphorbia didiereoides
- Euphorbia discrepans
- Euphorbia duranii
- Euphorbia elliotii
- Euphorbia epiphylloides
- Euphorbia erythroxyloides
- Euphorbia greenwayi
- Euphorbia grossheimii, Grossheim's spurge
- Euphorbia guillauminiana
- Euphorbia haeleeleana
- Euphorbia hamaderoensis
- Euphorbia hedyotoides
- Euphorbia herman-schwartzii
- Euphorbia horombensis
- Euphorbia humbertii
- Euphorbia imerina
- Euphorbia kamponii
- Euphorbia kuwaleana
- Euphorbia mananarensis
- Euphorbia mandravioky
- Euphorbia mangokyensis
- Euphorbia mangorensis
- Euphorbia neohumbertii
- Euphorbia pseudonudicaule
- Euphorbia quartziticola
- Euphorbia santapaui
- Euphorbia tetracanthoides
- Euphorbia wakefieldii
- Jatropha costaricensis
- Jatropha nudicaulis
- Koilodepas calycinum
- Macaranga mauritiana
- Sebastiania fasciculata
- Sebastiania spicata
- Tetrorchidium brevifolium
- Thecacoris annobonae syn. Thecacoris trichogyne
- Wetria australiensis

Subspecies

- Euphorbia cylindrifolia subsp. cylindrifolia
- Euphorbia skottsbergii subsp. skottsbergii
- Necepsia castaneifolia subsp. chirindica
- Necepsia castaneifolia subsp. kimbozensis

Varieties

- Antidesma platyphyllum var. hillebrandii
- Drypetes usambarica var. stylosa
- Euphorbia celastroides var. kaenana
- Euphorbia decaryi var. decaryi
- Euphorbia duranii var. duranii
- Euphorbia greenwayi var. breviaculeata
- Euphorbia mahafalensis var. mahafalensis
- Euphorbia milii var. bevilanensis
- Euphorbia milii var. vulcanii
- Euphorbia perrieri var. elongata
- Euphorbia perrieri var. perrieri
- Euphorbia primulifolia var. begardii
- Jatropha hildebrandtii var. hildebrandtii

==== Hypericaceae ====
Species

- Hypericum asplundii
- Hypericum prietoi
- Hypericum theodori, Theodor's Saint John's wort
- Vismia jefensis
- Vismia pauciflora

Subspecies

- Hypericum socotranum subsp. socotranum

==== Phyllanthaceae ====
Species

- Aporosa bourdillonii
- Cleistanthus travancorensis
- Flueggea anatolica
- Glochidion andamanicum
- Glochidion brunnescens
- Glochidion camiguinense
- Glochidion canescens
- Glochidion curranii
- Glochidion delticola
- Glochidion discogyne
- Glochidion dolichostylum
- Glochidion emarginatum
- Glochidion galorii
- Glochidion glaucescens
- Glochidion gracile
- Glochidion grantii
- Glochidion grossum
- Glochidion hivaoaense
- Glochidion intercastellanum
- Glochidion katikii
- Glochidion korthalsii
- Glochidion loerzingii
- Glochidion moorei
- Glochidion multilobum
- Glochidion nothofageticum
- Glochidion oblongifolium
- Glochidion oxygonum
- Glochidion palawanense
- Glochidion papenooense
- Glochidion pauciflorum
- Glochidion phyllanthoides
- Glochidion pitcairnense
- Glochidion pyriforme
- Glochidion rugulosum
- Glochidion sisparense
- Glochidion tetrapteron
- Glochidion tomentosum
- Lingelsheimia sylvestris
- Phyllanthus ambatovolana
- Phyllanthus ampandrandavae
- Phyllanthus analamerae
- Phyllanthus anamalayanus
- Phyllanthus ankaratrae
- Phyllanthus avanguiensis
- Phyllanthus axillaris
- Phyllanthus balansaeanus
- Phyllanthus baraouaensis
- Phyllanthus biantherifer
- Phyllanthus boguenensis
- Phyllanthus bolivianus
- Phyllanthus caligatus
- Phyllanthus caymanensis
- Phyllanthus coalcomanensis
- Phyllanthus coluteoides
- Phyllanthus conjugatus
- Phyllanthus cornutus
- Phyllanthus cuneifolius
- Phyllanthus deciduiramus
- Phyllanthus dewildiorum
- Phyllanthus dorotheae
- Phyllanthus dumbeaensis
- Phyllanthus dusenii
- Phyllanthus favieri
- Phyllanthus geniculatostemon
- Phyllanthus golonensis
- Phyllanthus guillauminii
- Phyllanthus haughtii
- Phyllanthus isomonensis
- Phyllanthus jaubertii
- Phyllanthus kostermansii
- Phyllanthus laxiflorus
- Phyllanthus lebrunii
- Phyllanthus macphersonii
- Phyllanthus macrochorion
- Phyllanthus mangenotii
- Phyllanthus marojejiensis
- Phyllanthus merinthopodus
- Phyllanthus mittenianus
- Phyllanthus ningaensis
- Phyllanthus nitens
- Phyllanthus nyikae
- Phyllanthus parangoyensis
- Phyllanthus paucitepalus
- Phyllanthus petchikaraensis
- Phyllanthus philippioides
- Phyllanthus pinjenensis
- Phyllanthus polygynus
- Phyllanthus pterocladus
- Phyllanthus raynalii
- Phyllanthus rufuschaneyi
- Phyllanthus sacleuxii
- Phyllanthus salicifolius
- Phyllanthus smithianus
- Phyllanthus sponiaefolius
- Phyllanthus stipitatus
- Phyllanthus strobilaceus
- Phyllanthus tagulae
- Phyllanthus tanaensis
- Phyllanthus tiebaghiensis
- Phyllanthus tixieri
- Phyllanthus trichopodus
- Phyllanthus umbricola
- Phyllanthus urceolatus
- Phyllanthus venustulus
- Phyllanthus verrucicaulis
- Phyllanthus vespertilio
- Phyllanthus wilkesianus
- Phyllanthus yvettae
- Uapaca niangadoumae

Varieties

- Glochidion ellipticum var. ralphii
- Phyllanthus aeneus var. nepouiensis

==== Rhizophoraceae ====
- Cassipourea acuminata
- Cassipourea brittoniana
- Pellacalyx yunnanensis

==== Other Malpighiales ====
Species

- Anthodiscus chocoensis
- Caryocar amygdaliforme
- Caryocar coriaceum
- Quiina schippii
- Salix kusanoi
- Testulea gabonensis

=== Malvales ===
==== Bombacaceae ====
- Adansonia grandidieri
- Adansonia suarezensis
- Camptostemon philippinense
- Matisia alata
- Matisia coloradorum
- Matisia grandifolia
- Matisia palenquiana
- Quararibea dolichopoda
- Quararibea pendula

==== Dipterocarpaceae ====
Species

- Anisoptera costata
- Anisoptera reticulata
- Anisoptera scaphula
- Cotylelobium burckii
- Cotylelobium scabriusculum
- Dipterocarpus acutangulus
- Dipterocarpus chartaceus
- Dipterocarpus conformis
- Dipterocarpus dyeri
- Dipterocarpus fusiformis
- Dipterocarpus geniculatus
- Dipterocarpus glabrigemmatus
- Dipterocarpus glandulosus
- Dipterocarpus grandiflorus
- Dipterocarpus hasseltii
- Dipterocarpus indicus
- Dipterocarpus insignis
- Dipterocarpus intricatus
- Dipterocarpus kerrii
- Dipterocarpus ochraceus
- Dipterocarpus orbicularis
- Dipterocarpus perakensis
- Dipterocarpus retusus
- Dipterocarpus rotundifolius
- Dipterocarpus semivestitus
- Dipterocarpus sublamellatus
- Dipterocarpus tempehes
- Dryobalanops rappa
- Hopea aequalis
- Hopea altocollina
- Hopea apiculata
- Hopea brevipetiolaris
- Hopea cagayanensis
- Hopea canarensis
- Hopea celebica
- Hopea centipeda
- Hopea cernua
- Hopea chinensis
- Hopea cordifolia
- Hopea discolor
- Hopea enicosanthoides
- Hopea ferrea
- Hopea foxworthyi
- Hopea glabra
- Hopea gregaria
- Hopea griffithii
- Hopea hainanensis
- Hopea helferi
- Hopea longirostrata
- Hopea megacarpa
- Hopea mindanensis
- Hopea mollissima, synonym of Hopea chinensis
- Hopea parviflora
- Hopea pedicellata
- Hopea philippinensis
- Hopea polyalthioides
- Hopea quisumbingiana
- Hopea racophloea
- Hopea recopei
- Hopea reticulata
- Hopea samarensis
- Hopea semicuneata
- Hopea subalata
- Hopea thorelii
- Hopea utilis, synonym of Hopea longifolia
- Hopea vacciniifolia
- Monotes duvigneaudii
- Monotes hirtii
- Monotes lutambensis
- Monotes madagascariensis
- Monotes paivae
- Monotes rufotomentosus
- Neobalanocarpus heimii
- Parashorea aptera
- Parashorea chinensis
- Shorea alutacea, synonym of Richetia alutacea
- Shorea arsorianoi
- Shorea astylosa
- Shorea biawak
- Shorea bracteolata, synonym of Anthoshorea bracteolata
- Shorea brunnescens
- Shorea calcicola
- Shorea conica, synonym of Richetia conica
- Shorea cordata, synonym of Anthoshorea cordata
- Shorea domatiosa
- Shorea elliptica, synonym of Rubroshorea elliptica
- Shorea faguetiana, synonym of Richetia faguetiana
- Shorea farinosa, synonym of Anthoshorea farinosa
- Shorea glauca
- Shorea gratissima, synonym of Anthoshorea gratissima
- Shorea henryana, synonym of Anthoshorea henryana
- Shorea hulanidda, synonym of Anthoshorea hulanidda
- Shorea hypochra, synonym of Anthoshorea hypochra
- Shorea inaequilateralis, synonym of Rubroshorea inaequilateralis
- Shorea javanica, synonym of Anthoshorea javanica
- Shorea lamellata, synonym of Anthoshorea lamellata
- Shorea longisperma, synonym of Richetia longisperma
- Shorea materialis
- Shorea pachyphylla, synonym of Rubroshorea pachyphylla
- Shorea pallescens
- Shorea pallidifolia, synonym of Rubroshorea pallidifolia
- Shorea platycarpa, synonym of Rubroshorea platycarpa
- Shorea splendida, synonym of Rubroshorea splendida
- Shorea sumatrana
- Shorea tenuiramulosa, synonym of Richetia tenuiramulosa
- Shorea tumbuggaia, synonym of Shorea tumbugaia
- Shorea uliginosa, synonym of Rubroshorea uliginosa
- Shorea virescens, synonym of Anthoshorea virescens
- Shorea woodii, synonym of Rubroshorea woodii
- Shorea zeylanica, synonym of Doona zeylanica
- Stemonoporus angustisepalus
- Stemonoporus canaliculatus
- Stemonoporus cordifolius
- Stemonoporus elegans
- Stemonoporus kanneliyensis
- Stemonoporus lancifolius
- Stemonoporus oblongifolius
- Stemonoporus petiolaris
- Stemonoporus reticulatus
- Stemonoporus revolutus
- Stemonoporus rigidus
- Stemonoporus scalarinervis
- Stemonoporus wightii
- Vatica abdulrahmaniana
- Vatica affinis
- Vatica chartacea
- Vatica chinensis
- Vatica congesta
- Vatica diospyroides
- Vatica endertii
- Vatica flavovirens
- Vatica globosa
- Vatica guangxiensis
- Vatica havilandii
- Vatica lobata
- Vatica mizaniana
- Vatica najibiana
- Vatica obovata
- Vatica pachyphylla
- Vatica pallida
- Vatica paludosa
- Vatica philastreana
- Vatica rotata
- Vatica rynchocarpa
- Vatica scortechinii
- Vatica subglabra
- Vatica teysmanniana

Subspecies

- Dipterocarpus caudatus subsp. penangianus
- Dryobalanops oblongifolia subsp. oblongifolia
- Dryobalanops oblongifolia subsp. occidentalis
- Shorea agami subsp. agami
- Shorea macroptera subsp. baillonii
- Shorea macroptera subsp. macropterifolia
- Shorea ovalis subsp. ovalis
- Shorea parvifolia subsp. parvifolia
- Shorea parvifolia subsp. velutina
- Vatica oblongifolia subsp. multinervosa
- Vatica odorata subsp. mindanensis

==== Elaeocarpaceae ====
- Elaeocarpus blascoi
- Elaeocarpus ceylanicus
- Elaeocarpus coriaceus

==== Malvaceae ====
Species

- Acropogon calcicolus
- Acropogon veillonii
- Akrosida macrophylla
- Alcea grossheimii, Grossheim's alcea
- Atkinsia cubensis
- Diplodiscus scortechinii
- Firmiana major
- Gossypium raimondii
- Hampea montebellensis
- Hibiscus arnottianus
- Hibiscus noli-tangere
- Hibiscus socotranus
- Hildegardia cubensis
- Hildegardia migeodii
- Julostylis polyandra
- Lebronnecia kokioides
- Wercklea cocleana
- Wercklea grandiflora
- Wissadula diffusa
- Wissadula divergens

Subspecies

- Hibiscus arnottianus subsp. immaculatus, white Molokai hibiscus
- Hibiscus brackenridgei subsp. brackenridgei
- Hibiscus brackenridgei subsp. mokuleianus
- Hibiscus kokio subsp. saintjohnianus, Saint John's rosemallow

==== Sarcolaenaceae ====
- Leptolaena pauciflora
- Leptolaena raymondii
- Leptolaena villosa
- Mediusella bernieri
- Pentachlaena latifolia
- Pentachlaena orientalis
- Sarcolaena delphinensis
- Schizolaena capuronii
- Schizolaena cavacoana
- Schizolaena charlotteae
- Schizolaena isaloensis
- Schizolaena manomboensis
- Schizolaena masoalensis
- Schizolaena milleri
- Schizolaena parvipetala
- Schizolaena turkii
- Xerochlamys diospyroidea
- Xerochlamys elliptica
- Xerochlamys itremoensis
- Xerochlamys undulata
- Xerochlamys villosa

==== Sphaerosepalaceae ====
- Dialyceras discolor
- Rhopalocarpus mollis
- Rhopalocarpus randrianaivoi

==== Sterculiaceae ====
Species

- Byttneria asplundii
- Byttneria flexuosa
- Byttneria loxensis
- Byttneria obtusata
- Cola attiensis
- Cola boxiana
- Cola lourougnonis
- Cola lukei
- Cola octoloboides
- Cola philipi-jonesii
- Cola porphyrantha
- Heritiera fomes
- Heritiera globosa
- Heritiera percoriacea
- Herrania balaensis
- Herrania umbratica
- Hildegardia ankaranensis
- Hildegardia gillettii
- Nesogordonia monantha
- Paramelhania decaryana

Varieties

- Mansonia altissima var. altissima

==== Thymelaeaceae ====
- Daphne sophia
- Daphnopsis grandis
- Gnidia bojeriana
- Gonystylus areolatus
- Gonystylus augescens
- Gonystylus eximius
- Octolepis oblanceolata
- Stephanodaphne humbertii
- Wikstroemia bicornuta

==== Tiliaceae ====
- Brownlowia velutina
- Carpodiptera ophiticola
- Craigia yunnanensis
- Diplodiscus hookerianus
- Grewia limae
- Neosprucea sararensis
- Schoutenia cornerii

=== Myrtales ===
There are 227 species, four subspecies, and ten varieties in the order Myrtales assessed as endangered.

==== Combretaceae ====
Species

- Anogeissus bentii
- Buchenavia iguaratensis
- Buchenavia pabstii
- Buchenavia rabelloana
- Bucida ophiticola
- Combretum esteriense
- Terminalia acuminata
- Terminalia arbuscula, white olive
- Terminalia archipelagi
- Terminalia bucidoides
- Terminalia cherrieri
- Terminalia eriostachya
- Terminalia exelliana
- Terminalia diptera (Note: Listed by IUCN as Terminalia intermedia; see Plants of the World Online for taxonomy: "T. diptera (Sagra) Greuter & R. Rankin", and synonyms)
- Terminalia habeensis
- Terminalia richii

Subspecies

- Terminalia parvifolia subsp. rabelloana

==== Lythraceae ====
Species

- Ammannia nagpurensis
- Lagerstroemia langkawiensis
- Lagerstroemia minuticarpa
- Nesaea aurita
- Nesaea linearis
- Nesaea maxima
- Nesaea parkeri
- Nesaea stuhlmannii
- Nesaea triflora
- Rotala cookii
- Rotala ritchiei

Varieties

- Nesaea parkeri var. parkeri

==== Melastomataceae ====
Species

- Aciotis aristellata, synonym of Aciotis rubricaulis
- Antherotoma clandestina
- Axinaea sessilifolia
- Axinaea sodiroi
- Blakea acostae
- Blakea brunnea
- Blakea eriocalyx
- Blakea formicaria
- Blakea incompta
- Blakea involvens
- Blakea jativae
- Blakea languinosa
- Brachyotum ecuadorense
- Brachyotum rotundifolium
- Brachyotum trichocalyx
- Calvoa stenophylla
- Chaetogastra anderssonii syn. Tibouchina anderssonii
- Cincinnobotrys letouzeyi
- Clidemia ablusa
- Clidemia campii
- Clidemia cutucuensis
- Conostegia extinctoria
- Conostegia subprocera
- Dissotis aprica
- Dissotis arborescens
- Graffenrieda grandifolia
- Gravesia hylophila
- Gravesia riparia
- Henriettella goudotiana
- Huilaea kirkbridei
- Huilaea macrocarpa
- Huilaea mutisiana
- Huilaea penduliflora
- Lijndenia procteri
- Memecylon alipes
- Memecylon amshoffiae
- Memecylon cuneatum
- Memecylon discolor
- Memecylon ellipticum
- Memecylon flavescens
- Memecylon giganteum
- Memecylon gracillimum
- Memecylon macrophyllum
- Memecylon magnifoliatum
- Memecylon revolutum
- Memecylon semseii
- Memecylon sp. 1
- Memecylon subramanii
- Meriania acostae
- Meriania ampla
- Meriania campii
- Meriania costata
- Meriania loxensis
- Meriania maguirei
- Meriania panamensis
- Meriania peltata
- Meriania stellata
- Miconia ascendens
- Miconia asplundii
- Miconia aspratilis
- Miconia barbipilis
- Miconia beneolens
- Miconia castrensis
- Miconia centrosperma
- Miconia collayensis
- Miconia corazonica
- Miconia cuprea
- Miconia cutucuensis
- Miconia dodsonii
- Miconia espinosae
- Miconia fosbergii
- Miconia fuliginosa
- Miconia glyptophylla
- Miconia guayaquilensis
- Miconia hirsutivena
- Miconia inanis
- Miconia ledifolia
- Miconia macbrydeana
- Miconia medusa
- Miconia nasella
- Miconia nubicola
- Miconia oligantha
- Miconia ombrophila
- Miconia onaensis
- Miconia pailasana
- Miconia pausana
- Miconia pilaloensis
- Miconia poecilantha
- Miconia prietoi
- Miconia prominens
- Miconia pseudorigida
- Miconia vesca
- Miconia villonacensis
- Mouriri completens
- Ossaea incerta
- Ossaea palenquensis
- Tessmannianthus gordonii
- Tessmannianthus quadridomius
- Tetrazygia albicans
- Topobea cutucuensis
- Topobea eplingii
- Topobea macbrydei
- Topobea maguirei
- Topobea toachiensis
- Topobea verrucosa
- Triolena asplundii
- Triolena campii
- Tristemma schliebenii
- Warneckea austro-occidentalis
- Warneckea mangrovensis
- Warneckea maritima
- Warneckea melindensis
- Warneckea schliebenii
- Warneckea wildeana

Varieties

- Clidemia crossosepala var. adamsii
- Gravesia pulchra var. glandulosa
- Gravesia pulchra var. pulchra
- Miconia quadrangularis var. glandulosa
- Mouriri emarginata var. rostrata

==== Myrtaceae ====
Species

- Acca lanuginosa
- Acca macrostema
- Amomyrtella irregularis
- Archirhodomyrtus vieillardii
- Basisperma lanceolata
- Calycorectes australis, synonym of Eugenia tenuipedunculata
- Calycorectes batavorum
- Calycorectes enormis
- Calycorectes mexicanus
- Calycorectes sellowianus, synonym of Eugenia vattimoana
- Campomanesia costata
- Campomanesia espiritosantensis
- Cloezia deplanchei
- Decaspermum lanceolatum
- Decaspermum philippinum
- Eucalyptus absita
- Eucalyptus aequioperta
- Eucalyptus arcana
- Eucalyptus argophloia
- Eucalyptus aurifodina
- Eucalyptus behriana
- Eucalyptus benthamii
- Eucalyptus brevipes
- Eucalyptus calycogona
- Eucalyptus conglomerata
- Eucalyptus cretata
- Eucalyptus cuprea
- Eucalyptus desmondensis
- Eucalyptus dissimulata
- Eucalyptus dolichorhyncha
- Eucalyptus elaeophloia
- Eucalyptus erectifolia
- Eucalyptus erythronema
- Eucalyptus forrestiana
- Eucalyptus froggattii
- Eucalyptus fulgens
- Eucalyptus goniocarpa
- Eucalyptus gunnii
- Eucalyptus johnsoniana
- Eucalyptus kabiana
- Eucalyptus kitsoniana
- Eucalyptus kondininensis
- Eucalyptus longicornis
- Eucalyptus microcarpa
- Eucalyptus mimica
- Eucalyptus molyneuxii
- Eucalyptus myriadena
- Eucalyptus neutra
- Eucalyptus nudicaulis
- Eucalyptus occidentalis
- Eucalyptus odorata
- Eucalyptus orthostemon
- Eucalyptus paludicola
- Eucalyptus peninsularis
- Eucalyptus petiolaris
- Eucalyptus petrensis
- Eucalyptus platydisca
- Eucalyptus platypus
- Eucalyptus recta
- Eucalyptus rhodantha
- Eucalyptus rhomboidea
- Eucalyptus rigens
- Eucalyptus rugulata
- Eucalyptus sargentii
- Eucalyptus spathulata
- Eucalyptus splendens
- Eucalyptus stoatei
- Eucalyptus strzeleckii
- Eucalyptus synandra
- Eucalyptus urophylla
- Eucalyptus valens
- Eucalyptus woollsiana
- Eucalyptus wubinensis
- Eucalyptus yarraensis
- Eugenia abbreviata
- Eugenia acrisepala
- Eugenia altissima
- Eugenia amshoffiae
- Eugenia analamerensis
- Eugenia andapae
- Eugenia antongilensis
- Eugenia ardyceae
- Eugenia arenicola
- Eugenia arrhaphocalyx
- Eugenia belloi
- Eugenia blanchetiana
- Eugenia boqueronensis
- Eugenia breedlovei
- Eugenia brownsbergii
- Eugenia caatingicola
- Eugenia calcadensis
- Eugenia casearioides
- Eugenia cervina
- Eugenia chahalana
- Eugenia chavarriae
- Eugenia chiapensis
- Eugenia chinajensis
- Eugenia citroides
- Eugenia cloiselii
- Eugenia colipensis
- Eugenia crassicaulis
- Eugenia cristalensis
- Eugenia cuaoensis
- Eugenia culminicola
- Eugenia daenikeri
- Eugenia denigrata
- Eugenia discifera
- Eugenia disperma
- Eugenia donosoensis
- Eugenia doubledayi
- Eugenia earthiana
- Eugenia ekmanii
- Eugenia eliasii
- Eugenia emarginata
- Eugenia eperforata
- Eugenia espinhacensis
- Eugenia fajardensis
- Eugenia farinacea
- Eugenia farneyi
- Eugenia fissurata
- Eugenia floccosa
- Eugenia gatopensis
- Eugenia gibberosa
- Eugenia gigas
- Eugenia glabra
- Eugenia glabrescens
- Eugenia goiapabana
- Eugenia grandifolia
- Eugenia grandissima
- Eugenia grayumii
- Eugenia grijalvae
- Eugenia guajavoides
- Eugenia haberi
- Eugenia haematocarpa
- Eugenia herrerae
- Eugenia hypoleuca, synonym of Eugenia codyensis
- Eugenia indica
- Eugenia inversa
- Eugenia itacarensis
- Eugenia itajurensis
- Eugenia izabalana
- Eugenia jambosoides
- Eugenia janeirensis
- Eugenia joenssonii
- Eugenia johorensis
- Eugenia jutiapensis
- Eugenia koepperi
- Eugenia lacistema
- Eugenia lagoensis
- Eugenia lasiothecia
- Eugenia laurae
- Eugenia ledophylla
- Eugenia lempana
- Eugenia lepidota
- Eugenia liberiana
- Eugenia ligustroides
- Eugenia lithosperma
- Eugenia locuples
- Eugenia loheri
- Eugenia lokohensis
- Eugenia lomeroensis
- Eugenia longicuspis
- Eugenia longifolia
- Eugenia longipetiolata
- Eugenia longohypanthiata
- Eugenia louisae
- Eugenia louvelii
- Eugenia macahensis
- Eugenia macrobracteolata
- Eugenia maestrensis
- Eugenia magniflora
- Eugenia manonae
- Eugenia matagalpensis
- Eugenia mattosii
- Eugenia mcvaughii
- Eugenia michaelneei
- Eugenia miragoanae
- Eugenia moonioides
- Eugenia myrciariifolia
- Eugenia myrobalana
- Eugenia neibensis
- Eugenia neolaurifolia
- Eugenia neotristis
- Eugenia nicholsii
- Eugenia obovatifolia
- Eugenia ochracea
- Eugenia oligandra
- Eugenia ovandensis
- Eugenia pachyclada
- Eugenia pacifica
- Eugenia padronii
- Eugenia paloverdensis
- Eugenia piresii
- Eugenia polyadena
- Eugenia pruinosa
- Eugenia pseudomalacantha
- Eugenia pueblana
- Eugenia purpusii
- Eugenia pustulescens
- Eugenia pycnoneura, synonym of Myrciaria floribunda
- Eugenia quadrijuga
- Eugenia quebradensis
- Eugenia queretaroana
- Eugenia randrianasoloi
- Eugenia ravelonarivoi
- Eugenia ravenii
- Eugenia regia
- Eugenia retinadenia
- Eugenia roseopetala
- Eugenia roseopetiolata
- Eugenia rotundicosta
- Eugenia rubella
- Eugenia sachetae
- Eugenia salacifolia
- Eugenia sancarlosensis
- Eugenia sanjuanensis
- Eugenia sasoana
- Eugenia savannarum
- Eugenia schunkei
- Eugenia scottii
- Eugenia selvana
- Eugenia shimishito
- Eugenia shookii
- Eugenia sicifolia
- Eugenia singampattiana
- Eugenia sobraliana
- Eugenia sotoesparzae
- Eugenia sp. 'dagostini'
- Eugenia sp. 'metzdorfii'
- Eugenia sphenoides
- Eugenia sripadaense
- Eugenia standleyi
- Eugenia stirpiflora
- Eugenia subspinulosa
- Eugenia sulcatifolia
- Eugenia sulcivenia
- Eugenia taipingensis, synonym of Syzygium taipingense
- Eugenia tanaensis
- Eugenia teapensis
- Eugenia tenuimarginata
- Eugenia terpnophylla
- Eugenia tetrasticha
- Eugenia tiampoka
- Eugenia tilarana
- Eugenia toledinensis
- Eugenia tropophylla
- Eugenia trunciflora
- Eugenia tulanan
- Eugenia umtamvunensis
- Eugenia urschiana
- Eugenia uxpanapensis
- Eugenia valsuganana
- Eugenia variareolata
- Eugenia verruculata
- Eugenia vesca
- Eugenia viguieriana
- Eugenia virotii
- Eugenia williamsiana
- Eugenia wilsoniana
- Eugenia xilitlensis
- Eugenia yangambensis
- Eugenia yunckeri
- Eugenia zuchowskiae
- Gossia eugenioides
- Gossia virotii
- Kanakomyrtus dawsoniana
- Kanakomyrtus mcphersonii
- Kanakomyrtus revoluta
- Kania hirsutula
- Kania urdanetensis
- Legrandia concinna
- Melaleuca brevisepala
- Metrosideros halconensis
- Metrosideros humboldtiana
- Metrosideros longipetiolata
- Metrosideros macropus
- Metrosideros paniensis
- Metrosideros patens
- Metrosideros rugosa
- Metrosideros tabwemasanaensis
- Metrosideros tremuloides
- Metrosideros waialealae
- Mosiera contrerasii
- Mosiera havanensis
- Mosiera munizii
- Mosiera tussacii
- Myrceugenia brevipedicellata
- Myrceugenia correifolia
- Myrceugenia gertii
- Myrceugenia schulzei
- Myrcia almasensis
- Myrcia amarulenta
- Myrcia amplexicaulis
- Myrcia ampliflora
- Myrcia amplifolia
- Myrcia antioquensis
- Myrcia biconvexa
- Myrcia botryophylla
- Myrcia cana
- Myrcia cataphyllata
- Myrcia chionantha
- Myrcia chonodisca
- Myrcia clavata
- Myrcia compactiflora
- Myrcia connata
- Myrcia contrerasii
- Myrcia cordiformis
- Myrcia crassa
- Myrcia cristalensis
- Myrcia curassavica
- Myrcia decandra
- Myrcia elevata
- Myrcia federalis
- Myrcia ferruginosa
- Myrcia foveolata
- Myrcia fria
- Myrcia fusca
- Myrcia fusiformis
- Myrcia gigantea
- Myrcia guanacastensis
- Myrcia guarujana
- Myrcia hanoverensis
- Myrcia hypoleuca
- Myrcia inconspicua
- Myrcia jefensis
- Myrcia karwinskyana
- Myrcia kylistophylla
- Myrcia laxa
- Myrcia laxiflora
- Myrcia lughadhae
- Myrcia macaca
- Myrcia macrocalyx
- Myrcia macucana
- Myrcia maestrensis
- Myrcia magnifolia
- Myrcia manacalensis
- Myrcia manausensis
- Myrcia maritima
- Myrcia mayana
- Myrcia mesoamericana
- Myrcia monteverdensis
- Myrcia neoaequatoriensis
- Myrcia neocaudata
- Myrcia neofusca
- Myrcia neoimperfecta
- Myrcia neomacrophylla
- Myrcia neomcvaughii
- Myrcia neothomasiana
- Myrcia neovenulosa
- Myrcia neoverticillaris
- Myrcia panamensis
- Myrcia paulii-jonesii
- Myrcia pendula
- Myrcia petenensis
- Myrcia poeppigiana
- Myrcia porphyrea
- Myrcia pseudobrunneica
- Myrcia pseudopauciflora
- Myrcia ptariensis
- Myrcia pulvinata
- Myrcia reticulata
- Myrcia retusa
- Myrcia riodocensis
- Myrcia riverae
- Myrcia rupestris
- Myrcia ruschii
- Myrcia sessilis
- Myrcia sipapensis
- Myrcia siriacoana
- Myrcia skortzoviana
- Myrcia stictophylla
- Myrcia stigmatosa
- Myrcia straminea
- Myrcia styphelantha
- Myrcia suberosa
- Myrcia tenuiclada
- Myrcia tiburoniana
- Myrcia tonii
- Myrcia tovarensis
- Myrcia tridymantha
- Myrcia truncata
- Myrcia tumida
- Myrcia unana
- Myrcia venosissima
- Myrcia virgata
- Myrcianthes borealis
- Myrcianthes coquimbensis
- Myrcianthes crebrifolia
- Myrcianthes indifferens
- Myrcianthes pungens
- Myrciaria alagoana
- Myrciaria borinquena
- Myrciaria evanida
- Myrciaria myrtifolia
- Myrciaria pallida
- Myrciaria plinioides
- Neomitranthes amblymitra
- Neomitranthes cordifolia
- Neomitranthes pedicellata
- Pimenta adenoclada
- Pimenta filipes
- Pimenta oligantha
- Pimenta richardii
- Plinia abeggii
- Plinia callosa
- Plinia caricensis
- Plinia clausa
- Plinia duplipilosa
- Plinia espinhacensis
- Plinia guanacastensis
- Plinia hatschbachii
- Plinia moralesii
- Plinia muricata
- Plinia nicaraguensis
- Plinia puriscalensis
- Plinia rara
- Plinia renatiana
- Plinia silvestris
- Plinia spiciflora
- Plinia spirito-santensis
- Plinia ybotyrype
- Pseudoeugenia tenuifolia, synonym of Syzygium tenuifolium
- Psidium araucanum
- Psidium fulvum
- Psidium grazielae
- Psidium huanucoense
- Psidium rotundidiscum
- Psidium scopulorum
- Psidium sessiliflorum
- Rhodomyrtus obovata
- Rhodomyrtus surigaoensis
- Seorsus taxifolius
- Syzygium abbreviatum
- Syzygium acre
- Syzygium acrophilum
- Syzygium aemulum
- Syzygium aeoranthum
- Syzygium affine
- Syzygium alternifolium
- Syzygium angulatum
- Syzygium anthicoides
- Syzygium apodum
- Syzygium aurantiacum
- Syzygium barnesii
- Syzygium beddomei
- Syzygium benguetense
- Syzygium bicolor
- Syzygium blancoi
- Syzygium bourdillonii
- Syzygium brevicymum
- Syzygium burepense
- Syzygium busuense
- Syzygium cagayanense
- Syzygium calophyllifolium
- Syzygium casiguranense
- Syzygium chavaran
- Syzygium ciliatosetosum
- Syzygium clementis
- Syzygium comorense
- Syzygium consimile
- Syzygium contiguum
- Syzygium copelandii
- Syzygium cordatilimbum
- Syzygium corymbosum
- Syzygium craibii
- Syzygium crassibracteatum
- Syzygium daphne
- Syzygium dawsonianum
- Syzygium devogelii
- Syzygium discophorum
- Syzygium durum
- Syzygium ecostulatum
- Syzygium escritorii
- Syzygium fergusonii
- Syzygium fossiramulosum
- Syzygium foxworthyi
- Syzygium galanthum
- Syzygium garciae
- Syzygium gigantifolium
- Syzygium gitingense
- Syzygium globosum
- Syzygium heterobotrys
- Syzygium hughcumingii
- Syzygium inopinatum
- Syzygium isabelense
- Syzygium ixoroides
- Syzygium jiewhoei
- Syzygium kerstingii
- Syzygium klampok
- Syzygium kuneneense
- Syzygium lacustre
- Syzygium leytense
- Syzygium llanosii
- Syzygium loiseleurioides
- Syzygium longipedicellatum
- Syzygium longipetiolatum
- Syzygium longissimum
- Syzygium longistylum
- Syzygium lorofolium
- Syzygium lugubre
- Syzygium macrocalyx
- Syzygium madangense
- Syzygium mauritsii
- Syzygium megalanthum
- Syzygium mesekerrak
- Syzygium microcymum
- Syzygium microphyllum
- Syzygium mirabile
- Syzygium moultonii
- Syzygium myhendrae
- Syzygium namosialangense
- Syzygium neoeugenioides
- Syzygium neriifolium
- Syzygium nitens
- Syzygium occidentale
- Syzygium onivense
- Syzygium palauense
- Syzygium parameswaranii
- Syzygium perforatum
- Syzygium platypodum
- Syzygium poyanum
- Syzygium pseudolaetum
- Syzygium purpuriflorum
- Syzygium putii
- Syzygium pyrocarpum
- Syzygium rama-varmae
- Syzygium ramilepis
- Syzygium ramosii
- Syzygium ridsdalei
- Syzygium rigens
- Syzygium rigidifolium
- Syzygium robinsonii
- Syzygium rosenbluthii
- Syzygium rubropunctatum
- Syzygium rubropurpureum
- Syzygium rubrovenium
- Syzygium saliciforme
- Syzygium santosii
- Syzygium sarmentosum
- Syzygium schistaceum
- Syzygium schlechterianum
- Syzygium selukaifolium
- Syzygium setosum
- Syzygium slootenii
- Syzygium sogerense
- Syzygium spathulatum
- Syzygium stelechanthoides
- Syzygium subfoetidum
- Syzygium subglobosum
- Syzygium subsessile
- Syzygium subsessiliflorum
- Syzygium sulcistylum
- Syzygium sumatranum
- Syzygium surigaense
- Syzygium suringarianum
- Syzygium tayabense
- Syzygium taytayense
- Syzygium tenuipes
- Syzygium tontoutaense
- Syzygium toppingii
- Syzygium torricellianum
- Syzygium trianthum
- Syzygium triphyllum
- Syzygium tula
- Syzygium turbinatum
- Syzygium umbrosum
- Syzygium valentissimum
- Syzygium validinerve
- Syzygium veillonii
- Syzygium veillonii
- Syzygium velutinum
- Syzygium venustum
- Syzygium vernicosum
- Syzygium viburnoides
- Syzygium virotii
- Syzygium waikaiunense
- Syzygium wenzelii
- Syzygium whitfordii
- Syzygium williamsii
- Syzygium xiphophyllum
- Syzygium zamboangense
- Thaleropia iteophylla
- Tristaniopsis littoralis
- Tristaniopsis macrosperma
- Tristaniopsis micrantha
- Tristaniopsis oblongifolia
- Tristaniopsis pontianensis
- Tristaniopsis vieillardii
- Uromyrtus sarawakensis
- Xanthomyrtus grandiflora
- Xanthomyrtus koebrensis
- Xanthostemon confertiflorus
- Xanthostemon fruticosus
- Xanthostemon novaguineensis
- Xanthostemon verus

Subspecies

- Eugenia cotinifolia subsp. codyensis
- Eugenia mabaeoides subsp. mabaeoides
- Eugenia mabaeoides subsp. pedunculata
- Syzygium cordatum subsp. shimbaense

Varieties

- Campomanesia sessiliflora var. sessiliflora
- Cloezia artensis var. riparia
- Metrosideros polymorpha var. dieteri
- Metrosideros polymorpha var. newellii
- Metrosideros polymorpha var. nuda
- Metrosideros polymorpha var. pumila
- Metrosideros waialealae var. fauriei
- Metrosideros waialealae var. waialealae
- Pimenta racemosa var. terebinthina
- Syzygium assimile var. acuminata
- Syzygium zeylanicum var. ellipticum

==== Onagraceae ====
- Fuchsia hypoleuca
- Fuchsia scherffiana

=== Nymphaeales ===
- Nymphaea loriana
- Nymphaea stuhlmannii

=== Oxalidales ===
==== Cunoniaceae ====
- Acsmithia vitiense, synonym of Spiraeanthemum vitiense
- Codia belepensis
- Codia fusca
- Codia triverticillata
- Cunonia pseudoverticillata
- Cunonia rupicola
- Cunonia schinziana
- Eucryphia glutinosa
- Geissois bradfordii
- Lamanonia brasiliensis
- Lamanonia ulei
- Pancheria ajiearoana
- Pancheria dognyensis
- Pancheria mcphersonii
- Pancheria multijuga
- Pancheria robusta
- Pancheria rubrivenia
- Pancheria xaragurensis
- Pterophylla aggregata
- Pterophylla bernardii
- Pterophylla commersonii
- Pterophylla hepaticarum
- Pterophylla icacifolia
- Pterophylla louveliana
- Pterophylla lowryana
- Pterophylla lucida
- Pterophylla macgillivrayi
- Pterophylla magnifica
- Pterophylla rakotomalazana
- Pterophylla sanguisugarum
- Pterophylla venusta
- Spiraeanthemum collinum
- Spiraeanthemum pedunculatum
- Weinmannia integrifolia, synonym of Pterophylla bradfordii
- Weinmannia intermedia
- Weinmannia jahnii
- Weinmannia parvifoliolata
- Weinmannia tremuloides, synonym of Pterophylla tremuloides
- Weinmannia vescoi, synonym of Pterophylla vescoi
- Weinmannia vitiensis, synonym of Pterophylla vitiensis
- Weinmannia vulcanicola

==== Other Oxalidales ====
- Connarus brachybotryosus
- Hemandradenia chevalieri

=== Piperales ===
There are 51 species in the order Piperales assessed as endangered.

==== Piperaceae ====
- Peperomia arenillasensis
- Peperomia clivigaudens
- Peperomia disjunctiflora
- Peperomia espinosae
- Peperomia fagerlindii
- Peperomia kamerunana
- Peperomia lehmannii
- Peperomia leucanthera
- Peperomia pachystachya
- Peperomia paradoxa
- Peperomia persuculenta
- Peperomia rubropunctulata
- Peperomia salangonis
- Peperomia septentrionalis, wild Bermuda pepper
- Peperomia subdiscoidea
- Peperomia tuberculata
- Peperomia udimontana
- Peperomia valladolidana
- Peperomia wibomii
- Piper achupallasense
- Piper azuaiense
- Piper baezense
- Piper barberi
- Piper begoniiforme
- Piper brachipilum
- Piper brachystylum
- Piper campii
- Piper chimborazoense
- Piper coeloneurum
- Piper cutucuense
- Piper densiciliatum
- Piper diffundum
- Piper disparipilum
- Piper dodsonii
- Piper eriocladum
- Piper fallenii
- Piper huigranum
- Piper longicaudatum
- Piper mendezense
- Piper nanegalense
- Piper perstrigosum
- Piper prietoi
- Piper productispicum
- Piper puyoense
- Piper regale
- Piper saloyanum
- Piper skutchii
- Piper valladolidense
- Piper zarumanum

==== Chloranthaceae ====
- Hedyosmum burgerianum
- Hedyosmum correanum

=== Plumbaginales ===
- Armeria pseudarmeria
- Armeria soleirolii
- Limonium bahamense, heather
- Limonium fruticans
- Limonium legrandii
- Limonium poimenum
- Limonium preauxii
- Limonium strictissimum

=== Podostemales ===
- Farmeria indica
- Ledermanniella annithomae
- Ledermanniella bosii
- Ledermanniella letouzeyi
- Ledermanniella linearifolia
- Ledermanniella onanae
- Ledermanniella pusilla
- Ledermanniella thalloidea
- Ledermanniella variabilis
- Leiothylax quangensis
- Macropodiella pellucida
- Podostemum munnarense
- Terniopsis chanthaburiensis

=== Proteales ===
- Alloxylon brachycarpum
- Banksia mimica
- Beauprea congesta
- Bleasdalea papuana
- Grevillea tetragonoloba
- Helicia insularis
- Helicia shweliensis
- Heliciopsis lanceolata
- Leucadendron discolor
- Roupala brachybotrys
- Stenocarpus heterophyllus

=== Ranunculales ===
- Aconitum heterophyllum
- Anemone jamesonii
- Anemone uralensis
- Berberis bicolor
- Berberis iteophylla
- Coptis teeta
- Diphylleia sinensis
- Disciphania inversa
- Gymnospermium microrrhynchum
- Megaleranthis saniculifolia
- Meliosma linearifolia
- Meliosma littlei
- Papaver roseolum, pinkish poppy
- Tiliacora lehmbachii
- Triclisia lanceolata

=== Rosales ===
==== Brunelliaceae ====
Species

- Brunellia almaguerensis
- Brunellia darienensis
- Brunellia ecuadoriensis
- Brunellia pauciflora
- Brunellia penderiscana
- Brunellia rufa
- Brunellia zamorensis

Subspecies

- Brunellia comocladifolia subsp. boyacensis
- Brunellia littlei subsp. caucana

==== Cannabaceae ====
- Celtis hypoleuca

==== Cecropiaceae ====
- Coussapoa tolimensis

==== Cunoniaceae ====
Species

- Acsmithia vitiense
- Geissois imthurnii
- Geissois stipularis
- Spiraeanthemum graeffei
- Spiraeanthemum serratum
- Weinmannia costulata

Varieties

- Geissois ternata var. minor

==== Moraceae ====
Species

- Artocarpus montanus
- Artocarpus obtusus
- Artocarpus pithecogallus
- Brosimum glaucum
- Dorstenia dionga
- Dorstenia dorstenioides
- Dorstenia soerensenii
- Ficus ampana
- Ficus andamanica
- Ficus arawaensis
- Ficus aripuanensis
- Ficus beddomei
- Ficus bivalvata
- Ficus blepharophylla
- Ficus bonijesulapensis
- Ficus cataupi
- Ficus celebensis
- Ficus cupulata
- Ficus diamantina
- Ficus eliadis
- Ficus eustephana
- Ficus gilapong
- Ficus glareosa
- Ficus goniophylla
- Ficus gratiosa
- Ficus guatiquiae
- Ficus holosericea
- Ficus humbertii
- Ficus kofmaniae
- Ficus lasiosyce
- Ficus latimarginata
- Ficus meizonochlamys, synonym of Ficus membranacea
- Ficus muelleriana
- Ficus multistipularis
- Ficus oresbia
- Ficus osensis
- Ficus patellata
- Ficus pongumphaii
- Ficus ramiflora, synonym of Ficus longifolia
- Ficus richteri
- Ficus rigo
- Ficus romeroi
- Ficus roraimensis
- Ficus saruensis
- Ficus schumanniana
- Ficus sciaphila
- Ficus soepadmoi
- Ficus tequendamae
- Ficus ursina
- Naucleopsis francisci
- Pseudolmedia boliviana
- Scyphosyce pandurata
- Sorocea carautana
- Sorocea sarcocarpa

Subspecies

- Brosimum utile subsp. magdalenense

Varieties

- Dorstenia holstii var. holstii
- Ficus cotinifolia var. hondurensis, synonym of Ficus hondurensis

==== Pittosporaceae ====
- Pittosporum aliferum
- Pittosporum brevispinum
- Pittosporum eriocarpum
- Pittosporum gayanum
- Pittosporum muricatum
- Pittosporum napaliense
- Pittosporum ornatum
- Pittosporum patulum, pitpat

==== Rosaceae ====
Species

- Amygdalus ledebouriana
- Crataegus nigra, Hungarian thorn
- Malus komarovii
- Malus niedzwetzkyana
- Marcetella maderensis
- Prunus adenopoda
- Prunus ceylanica
- Prunus choreiana
- Prunus pulgarensis
- Prunus rubiginosa
- Prunus tadzhikistanica
- Prunus turfosa
- Pyracantha koidzumii
- Pyrus cajon
- Pyrus daralagezi, Daralagezian pear
- Pyrus hajastana, Hayastanyan pear
- Pyrus nutans, drooping pear
- Pyrus sosnovskyi, Sosnovsky's pear
- Pyrus tamamschianae, Tamamshyan's pear
- Pyrus theodorovii, Teodorov's pear
- Rosa sosnovskyana, Sosnovsky's rose
- Rubus zangezurus, Zangezurian blackberry
- Sorbus bristoliensis, Bristol whitebeam
- Sorbus multicrenata
- Spiraeanthus schrenkianus

Subspecies

- Prunus lusitanica subsp. azorica
- Prunus lusitanica subsp. lusitanica

Varieties

- Photinia serratifolia var. tomentosa

==== Rhamnaceae ====
Species

- Alphitonia marquesensis
- Bathiorhamnus vohemarensis
- Ceanothus arboreus
- Colubrina johnstonii
- Colubrina sordida
- Colubrina travancorica
- Frangula breedlovei
- Frangula chimalapensis
- Frangula inconspicua
- Frangula mcvaughii
- Frangula wendtii
- Jaffrea erubescens
- Karwinskia pluvialis
- Karwinskia subcordata
- Karwinskia tehuacana
- Lasiodiscus gillardinii
- Lasiodiscus lebrunii
- Phylica arborea
- Reynosia barbatula
- Reynosia cuneifolia
- Rhamnidium dictyophyllum
- Rhamnus ludovici-salvatoris
- Rhamnus persicifolia
- Sarcomphalus glaziovii
- Sarcomphalus pedunculatus
- Sarcomphalus yucatanensis
- Ziziphus hutchinsonii
- Ziziphus laui
- Ziziphus robertsoniana

Varieties

- Rhamnus capraeifolia var. matudai

==== Ulmaceae ====
- Ulmus chenmoui
- Zelkova abelicea

==== Urticaceae ====
Species

- Pilea riopalenquensis
- Pilea tungurahuae

Varieties

- Boehmeria australis var. dealbata

=== Santalales ===
- Agelanthus atrocoronatus
- Agelanthus igneus
- Agelanthus microphyllus
- Agelanthus uhehensis
- Agelanthus validus
- Anacolosa densiflora
- Dendrophthora capillaris
- Dendrophthora dalstroemii
- Dendrophthora fastigiata
- Dendrophthora ovata
- Dendrophthora thomasii
- Dendrophthora variabilis
- Englerina longiflora
- Englerina macilenta
- Englerina ramulosa
- Exocarpos gaudichaudii, Gaudichaud's exocarpus
- Heisteria cyathiformis
- Okoubaka aubrevillei, death tree
- Oncella schliebeniana
- Phoradendron madisonii
- Phoradendron wiensii
- Santalum freycinetianum, Lanai sandalwood
- Santalum haleakalae
- Santalum macgregorii
- Schoepfia arenaria
- Soyauxia talbotii
- Struthanthus lojae

=== Sapindales ===
There are 121 species, three subspecies, and seven varieties in the order Sapindales assessed as endangered.

==== Anacardiaceae ====
Species

- Cotinus nana
- Mangifera blommesteinii
- Mangifera dongnaiensis
- Mangifera khoonmengiana
- Mangifera monandra
- Mangifera nicobarica
- Mangifera paludosa
- Mangifera superba
- Mauria membranifolia
- Melanochyla axillaris
- Melanochyla condensata
- Melanochyla montana
- Melanochyla semecarpoides
- Micronychia bemangidiensis
- Micronychia danguyana
- Operculicarya borealis
- Operculicarya hyphaenoides
- Operculicarya multijuga
- Operculicarya pachypus
- Parishia trifoliolata
- Poupartia pubescens
- Rhus brenanii
- Semecarpus acuminata
- Semecarpus coriacea
- Semecarpus cupularis
- Semecarpus impressicostatus
- Semecarpus kinabaluensis
- Semecarpus lineatus
- Semecarpus pulvinatus
- Semecarpus riparia
- Tapirira rubrinervis
- Toxicodendron calcicolum
- Trichoscypha hallei

Varieties

- Nothopegia beddomei var. wynaadica

==== Burseraceae ====
Species

- Boswellia dioscoridis
- Bursera hollickii
- Canarium kipella
- Canarium paniculatum
- Dacryodes colombiana

Varieties

- Santiria rubiginosa var. pedicellata

==== Meliaceae ====
Species

- Aglaia bullata
- Carapa megistocarpa
- Cedrela lilloi
- Dysoxylum beddomei
- Dysoxylum malabaricum
- Guarea corrugata
- Guarea crispa
- Khaya madagascariensis
- Ruagea microphylla
- Swietenia humilis, Mexican mahogany
- Swietenia macrophylla, big leaf mahogany
- Trichilia blanchetii
- Trichilia breviflora
- Trichilia discolor
- Trichilia elsae
- Trichilia pungens
- Trichilia surumuensis
- Trichilia tetrapetala
- Trichilia trachyantha
- Trichilia triacantha
- Turraea barbata
- Turraea kimbozensis
- Walsura monophylla

Subspecies

- Trichilia lepidota subsp. lepidota

==== Rutaceae ====
Species

- Balfourodendron riedelianum
- Decatropis paucijuga
- Decazyx macrophyllus
- Erythrochiton giganteus
- Esenbeckia alata
- Fagara mezoneurospinosa
- Flindersia ifflaiana
- Flindersia pimenteliana
- Glycosmis monticola
- Glycosmis tomentella
- Helietta glaucescens
- Melicope balloui, rock pelea
- Melicope christophersenii
- Melicope cinerea
- Melicope haleakalae
- Melicope indica
- Melicope makahae
- Melicope orbicularis, orbicular pelea
- Melicope ovalis, wild pelea
- Melicope pallida
- Melicope puberula
- Melicope saint-johnii, St John's pelea
- Melicope sandwicensis
- Melicope waialealae
- Oxanthera fragrans
- Oxanthera neocaledonica
- Pitavia punctata
- Platydesma remyi
- Pleiospermium littorale
- Ruta microcarpa
- Vepris glandulosa
- Vepris heterophylla
- Zanthoxylum belizense
- Zanthoxylum ferrugineum
- Zanthoxylum gentlei
- Zanthoxylum hawaiiense
- Zanthoxylum nadeaudii
- Zanthoxylum negrilense
- Zanthoxylum panamense
- Zanthoxylum procerum
- Zanthoxylum psammophilum
- Zanthoxylum thomasianum, St Thomas prickly-ash, synonym of Zanthoxylum punctatum subsp. thomasianum

Subspecies

- Esenbeckia berlandieri subsp. litoralis
- Zanthoxylum fagara subsp. aguilarii

Varieties

- Picrella trifoliata var. gracilis
- Picrella trifoliata var. gracillima
- Vepris morogorensis var. subalata

==== Sapindaceae ====
Species

- Alectryon ramiflorus
- Allophylus dodsonii
- Chimborazoa lachnocarpa
- Cupaniopsis glabra
- Cupaniopsis mouana
- Cupaniopsis rosea
- Cupaniopsis rotundifolia
- Cupaniopsis squamosa
- Cupaniopsis subfalcata
- Cupaniopsis tontoutensis
- Deinbollia nyasica
- Euchorium cubense
- Gloeocarpus patentivalvis
- Guioa acuminata
- Guioa discolor
- Guioa myriadenia
- Guioa truncata
- Lecaniodiscus punctatus
- Paranephelium hainanense
- Placodiscus attenuatus
- Placodiscus caudatus
- Placodiscus pseudostipularis
- Podonephelium davidsonii
- Serjania brevipes
- Talisia setigera

Varieties

- Eriocoelum pungens var. inermis

==== Other Sapindales ====
Species

- Bretschneidera sinensis
- Brucea macrocarpa
- Bulnesia carrapo
- Dipteronia dyeriana
- Recchia simplicifolia

Varieties

- Ailanthus altissima var. tanakai

=== Saxifragales ===
- Aeonium gomerense
- Corylopsis coreana, Korean winter hazel
- Distylium gracile
- Liquidambar orientalis
- Paeonia parnassica
- Saxifraga presolanensis
- Saxifraga tombeanensis

=== Solanales ===
- Brunfelsia portoricensis, Puerto Rico raintree
- Cestrum chimborazinum
- Cestrum dielsii
- Cobaea aequatoriensis
- Cobaea campanulata
- Convolvulus lopezsocasii
- Convolvulus ruprechtii, Ruprecht's bindweed
- Cuscuta prismatica
- Grevea eggelingii var. echinocarpa
- Grevea eggelingii var. keniensis
- Goetzea elegans, beautiful goetzea
- Ipomoea flavivillosa
- Larnax steyermarkii
- Lycianthes rimbachii
- Markea fosbergii
- Nierembergia espinosae
- Nothocestrum latifolium
- Nymphoides herzogii
- Nymphoides krishnakesara
- Solanum albornozii
- Solanum carchiense
- Solanum chimborazense
- Solanum hugonis
- Solanum paralum
- Solanum sycocarpum

=== Violales ===
There are 68 species, one subspecies, and one variety in Violales assessed as endangered.

==== Flacourtiaceae ====
Species

- Banara ibaguensis
- Banara regia
- Banara riparia
- Banara wilsonii
- Casearia kaalaensis
- Casearia mexiae
- Chiangiodendron mexicanum
- Homalium betulifolium
- Homalium buxifolium
- Homalium hypolasium
- Homalium jainii
- Homalium juxtapositum
- Homalium mathieuanum
- Homalium polystachyum
- Homalium rubrocostatum
- Homalium spathulatum
- Hydnocarpus scortechinii
- Lasiochlamys hurlimannii
- Lunania dodecandra
- Lunania elongata
- Mayna pubescens
- Mayna suaveolens
- Xylosma grossecrenata
- Xylosma inaequinervia
- Xylosma latifolia syn. Flacourtia latifolia
- Xylosma obovata

Subspecies

- Xylosma suaveolens subsp. haroldii

==== Passifloraceae ====
Species

- Adenia dolichosiphon
- Adenia kigogoensis
- Adenia racemosa
- Adenia schliebenii
- Passiflora andina
- Passiflora anfracta
- Passiflora brachyantha
- Passiflora discophora
- Passiflora harlingii
- Passiflora linda
- Passiflora loxensis
- Passiflora luzmarina
- Passiflora montana
- Passiflora subpurpurea
- Passiflora zamorana

Varieties

- Paropsia grewioides var. orientalis

==== Violaceae ====
- Isodendrion longifolium
- Rinorea antioquiensis
- Rinorea bicornuta
- Rinorea cordata
- Rinorea deflexa
- Rinorea fausteana
- Rinorea haughtii
- Rinorea hymenosepala
- Rinorea laurifolia
- Rinorea villosiflora
- Viola cuicochensis
- Viola libanotica, Lebanon violet
- Viola oahuensis

==== Other Violales species ====
- Ancistrocladus korupensis
- Cistus chinamadensis
- Cochlospermum tetraporum
- Helianthemum dagestanicum, Dagestanian sun rose
- Helianthemum guerrae
- Nasa aequatoriana
- Nasa connectans
- Nasa peltata
- Nasa profundilobata
- Tuberaria major
- Turnera hindsiana
- Vasconcellea horovitziana
- Vasconcellea omnilingua

=== Zygophyllales ===
- Gonopterodendron sarmientoi, synonym of Bulnesia sarmientoi
- Guaiacum officinale, commoner lignum vitae

== Monocotyledons ==
=== Alismatales ===
- Aponogeton bogneri
- Aponogeton ranunculiflorus
- Aponogeton satarensis
- Phyllospadix japonicus, Asian surf grass
- Pseudalthenia aschersoniana
- Sagittaria lichuanensis
- Zostera chilensis
- Zostera geojeensis

=== Arales ===
==== Araceae ====
Species

- Amorphophallus stuhlmannii
- Anthurium barbacoasense
- Anthurium bucayanum
- Anthurium bushii
- Anthurium cutucuense
- Anthurium hieronymi
- Anthurium lennartii
- Anthurium pichinchae
- Anthurium saccardoi
- Anthurium scaberulum
- Anthurium splendidum
- Anthurium tenuifolium
- Arisaema heterocephalum
- Chlorospatha besseae
- Chlorospatha cutucuensis
- Cryptocoryne cognata
- Dracontium croatii
- Gonatopus marattioides
- Gorgonidium intermedium
- Philodendron quitense
- Philodendron ventricosum
- Stenospermation arborescens
- Stylochaeton bogneri
- Stylochaeton pilosus
- Typhonium circinnatum
- Xanthosoma eggersii

Subspecies

- Arisaema heterocephalum subsp. heterocephalum

=== Arecales ===
Species

- Aiphanes grandis
- Aiphanes leiostachys
- Aiphanes verrucosa
- Areca concinna
- Arenga micrantha
- Astrocaryum triandrum
- Bactris faucium
- Bactris setiflora
- Bactris timbuiensis
- Balaka microcarpa
- Basselinia gracilis
- Bentinckia nicobarica
- Borassus madagascariensis
- Ceroxylon alpinum
- Ceroxylon amazonicum
- Chamaedorea fractiflexa
- Chamaedorea glaucifolia
- Chamaedorea klotzschiana
- Chuniophoenix hainanensis
- Clinostigma samoense
- Coccothrinax ekmanii
- Coccothrinax proctorii, silver palm
- Copernicia ekmanii
- Cryosophila bartlettii
- Cyphosperma voutmelensis
- Dypsis acaulis
- Dypsis acuminum
- Dypsis ambilaensis
- Dypsis andapae
- Dypsis angusta
- Dypsis angustifolia
- Dypsis boiviniana, talanoka
- Dypsis bosseri
- Dypsis ceracea
- Dypsis corniculata
- Dypsis culminis
- Dypsis curtisii
- Dypsis eriostachys
- Dypsis faneva
- Dypsis fanjana
- Dypsis furcata
- Dypsis glabrescens
- Dypsis integra
- Dypsis linearis
- Dypsis lutea
- Dypsis malcomberi
- Dypsis mcdonaldiana
- Dypsis mirabilis
- Dypsis moorei
- Dypsis poivreana
- Dypsis psammophila
- Dypsis rivularis
- Dypsis saintelucei
- Dypsis schatzii
- Dypsis simianensis
- Dypsis tenuissima
- Dypsis turkii
- Dypsis utilis
- Gaussia spirituana
- Geonoma irena
- Heterospathe longipes
- Hyophorbe indica, palmiste poison
- Kentiopsis magnifica, synonym of Chambeyronia magnifica
- Kentiopsis oliviformis
- Kerriodoxa elegans
- Latania loddigesii
- Latania lontaroides
- Lemurophoenix halleuxii
- Licuala borneensis
- Livistona drudei
- Lodoicea maldivica, double coconut palm
- Marojejya darianii
- Masoala kona
- Neoveitchia storckii
- Parajubaea sunkha, sunkha palm
- Parajubaea torallyi
- Phytelephas tumacana
- Plectocomia dransfieldiana
- Plectocomia microstachys
- Ponapea hentyi
- Pritchardia flynnii, Flynn's loulu
- Pritchardia forbesiana
- Pritchardia glabrata
- Pritchardia lanaiensis
- Pritchardia lanigera
- Pritchardia minor, alakai swamp pritchardia
- Pritchardia perlmanii
- Pritchardia remota
- Ravenea albicans
- Ravenea dransfieldii
- Ravenea hildebrandtii
- Ravenea julietiae
- Ravenea krociana
- Ravenea nana
- Ravenea rivularis, majestic palm
- Roystonea stellata
- Sabal bermudana, Bermuda palm
- Satranala decussilvae
- Syagrus macrocarpa
- Trachycarpus nanus
- Veitchia montgomeryana
- Wettinia hirsuta
- Wettinia minima

Subspecies

- Coccothrinax crinita subsp. brevicrinis
- Coccothrinax crinita subsp. crinita, old man

=== Asparagales ===
==== Amaryllidaceae ====
Species

- Acis nicaeensis
- Allium pervestitum
- Allium pseudoalbidum, onion
- Allium struzlianum, Struzl's onion
- Caliphruria hartwegiana
- Crinum thaianum, onion plant
- Eucharis astrophiala
- Eucrosia aurantiaca
- Narcissus alcaracensis
- Narcissus bugei
- Narcissus longispathus
- Narcissus nevadensis
- Narcissus radinganorum
- Phaedranassa brevifolia
- Phaedranassa glauciflora
- Phaedranassa tunguraguae
- Phaedranassa viridiflora
- Strumaria chaplinii

Subspecies

- Narcissus nevadensis subsp. nevadensis, daffodil

==== Asparagaceae ====
- Agave caymanensis
- Asparagus fallax
- Asparagus nesiotes
- Asparagus usambarensis
- Bellevalia webbiana
- Chlorophytum hirsutum
- Chrysodracon fernaldii
- Chrysodracon forbesii, Forbes' dracaena
- Chrysodracon hawaiiensis
- Dracaena concinna
- Dracaena floribunda
- Dracaena ombet, Gabal Elba dragon tree
- Dracaena serrulata
- Ledebouria insularis
- Leopoldia gussonei

==== Asphodelaceae ====
Species

- Aloe adigratana
- Aloe albovestita
- Aloe ambigens
- Aloe ankoberensis
- Aloe ballii
- Aloe ballyi, rat aloe
- Aloe bella
- Aloe brandhamii
- Aloe cremnophila
- Aloe erensii
- Aloe erinacea
- Aloe friisii
- Aloe gillettii
- Aloe gracilicaulis
- Aloe grisea
- Aloe harlana
- Aloe hildebrandtii
- Aloe kefaensis
- Aloe ketabrowniorum
- Aloe kilifiensis
- Aloe monticola
- Aloe peckii
- Aloe peglerae
- Aloe penduliflora
- Aloe schelpei
- Aloe scobinifolia
- Aloe sinana
- Aloe sinkatana
- Aloe yavellana
- Aloidendron eminens
- Aloidendron ramosissimum, maiden's quiver tree
- Kniphofia reflexa

Subspecies

- Aloe megalacantha subsp. alticola

==== Iridaceae ====
- Crocus aerius, aerial crocus
- Iris bismarckiana, Nazareth iris
- Iris bostrensis
- Iris grant-duffii, Grant Duff's iris
- Iris hermona, Golan iris
- Iris koreana
- Iris lortetii
- Iris odaesanensis
- Iris sofarana, sofar iris
- Iris timofejewii, Timofeev's iris
- Iris westii
- Romulea aquatica

==== Orchidaceae ====
Species

- Acanthephippium sinense
- Acianthera compressicaulis
- Acianthera variegata
- Aeranthes antennophora
- Aeranthes neoperrieri
- Aeranthes setipes
- Aerides lawrenceae
- Amesiella philippinensis
- Amitostigma bifoliatum
- Amitostigma capitatum
- Amitostigma hemipilioides
- Amitostigma simplex
- Amitostigma tetralobum
- Amitostigma yuanum
- Anathallis tigridens, tiger toothed pleurothallis
- Ancistrorhynchus refractus
- Angraecopsis tenerrima
- Angraecum amplexicaule
- Angraecum cornucopiae
- Angraecum coutrixii
- Angraecum doratophyllum
- Angraecum humbertii
- Angraecum humblotianum
- Angraecum moratii
- Angraecum obesum
- Angraecum protensum
- Angraecum sambiranoense
- Angraecum sanfordii
- Angraecum setipes
- Anoectochilus zhejiangensis
- Benthamia elata
- Benthamia humbertii
- Benthamia nigrescens
- Benthamia nivea
- Benthamia praecox
- Benthamia procera
- Benthamia rostrata
- Brachionidium dressleri, cup orchid
- Brachionidium meridense
- Brachycorythis disoides
- Bulbophyllum anjozorobeense
- Bulbophyllum auriflorum
- Bulbophyllum concatenatum
- Bulbophyllum hirsutiusculum
- Bulbophyllum horizontale
- Bulbophyllum jumelleanum
- Bulbophyllum kainochiloides
- Bulbophyllum modicum
- Bulbophyllum paleiferum
- Bulbophyllum pandanetorum
- Bulbophyllum rubrolabellum
- Bulbophyllum tokioi
- Bulbophyllum zaratananae
- Calanthe yuana
- Cephalanthera cucullata
- Changnienia amoena
- Cheirostylis inabai
- Coelogyne bulleyia
- Cryptopus brachiatus
- Cymbidium defoliatum
- Cymbidium nanulum
- Cynorkis aphylla
- Cynorkis cuneilabia
- Cynorkis gymnochiloides
- Cynorkis perrieri
- Cynorkis quinqueloba
- Cynorkis sambiranoensis
- Cynorkis stolonifera
- Cynorkis zaratananae
- Cypripedium calcicola, lime loving cypripedium
- Cypripedium californicum, California lady's slipper
- Cypripedium dickinsonianum, Dickinson's cypripedium
- Cypripedium elegans, elegant cypripedium
- Cypripedium fargesii
- Cypripedium farreri, Farrer's cypripedium
- Cypripedium fasciolatum, striped lady slipper
- Cypripedium formosanum, Formosa's lady's slipper
- Cypripedium forrestii, Forrest's cypripedium
- Cypripedium franchetii, Franchet's cypripedium
- Cypripedium himalaicum, Himalayan cypripedium
- Cypripedium japonicum, Korean ladyslipper
- Cypripedium lentiginosum, freckled cypripedium
- Cypripedium lichiangense, Lijiang cypripedium
- Cypripedium ludlowii, Ludlow's cypripedium
- Cypripedium margaritaceum
- Cypripedium micranthum, small flowered cypripedium
- Cypripedium sichuanense, Sichuan cypripedium
- Cypripedium singchii, Singchi's cypripedium
- Cypripedium subtropicum, subtropical cypripedium
- Cypripedium wardii, Ward's cypripedium
- Cypripedium yunnanense, Yunnan cypripedium
- Dactylorhiza kalopissii, Kalopiss' dactylorhiza
- Dactylorhiza maurusia
- Dendrobium changjiangense
- Dendrobium flexicaule
- Dendrobium guangxiense
- Dendrobium leptocladum
- Dendrobium lohohense
- Dendrobium minutiflorum
- Dendrobium sinense
- Dendrobium wilsonii
- Diaphananthe bueae
- Diaphananthe tanneri
- Disperis erucifera
- Disperis kamerunensis
- Disperis kerstenii
- Disperis lanceolata
- Disperis majungensis
- Disperis masoalensis
- Disperis nitida
- Dracula diana
- Dracula gorgona
- Encyclia caicensis, wild shallot
- Epipactis greuteri
- Epipactis placentina
- Epipactis tallosii
- Eulophia coddii
- Eulophia fernandeziana
- Eulophia taiwanensis
- Galeandra bicarinata, two-keeled hooded orchid
- Gastrodia tuberculata
- Gastrorchis tuberculosa
- Genyorchis micropetala
- Gomesa silvana, forest growing oncidium
- Gymnadenia archiducis-joannis
- Gymnadenia bicornis
- Gymnadenia crassinervis
- Gymnadenia lithopolitanica
- Gymnadenia stiriaca
- Gymnadenia widderi
- Habenaria batesii
- Habenaria isoantha
- Habenaria leucoceras
- Habenaria mossii
- Habenaria richardsiae
- Hederorkis seychellensis
- Hemipilia amesiana
- Hemipilia crassicalcarata
- Hemipilia cruciata
- Hemipilia henryi
- Hexalectris warnockii, Texas crested coralroot
- Himantoglossum metlesicsianum, Metlesics' himantoglossum
- Holcoglossum quasipinifolium
- Holopogon smithianus
- Jumellea anjouanensis
- Liparis bautingensis
- Manniella cypripedioides
- Masdevallia atahualpa
- Myrmecophila thomsoniana, banana orchid
- Mystacidium pulchellum
- Neottianthe camptoceras
- Orchis sitiaca, Cretan orchid
- Panisea yunnanensis
- Paphiopedilum acmodontum, pointed tooth paphiopedilum
- Paphiopedilum appletonianum, Appleton's paphiopedilum
- Paphiopedilum areeanum
- Paphiopedilum argus, Argus paphiopedilum
- Paphiopedilum armeniacum, apricot orange paphiopedilum
- Paphiopedilum barbatum, bearded paphiopedilum
- Paphiopedilum barbigerum, beard carrying paphiopedilum
- Paphiopedilum bellatulum, enchanting paphiopedilum
- Paphiopedilum bullenianum, Bullen's paphiopedilum
- Paphiopedilum callosum, callus paphiopedilum
- Paphiopedilum charlesworthii, Charlesworth paphiopedilum
- Paphiopedilum ciliolare, short haired paphiopedilum
- Paphiopedilum concolor, one colored paphiopedilum
- Paphiopedilum dianthum, double flowered paphiopedilum
- Paphiopedilum glanduliferum, gland-bearing paphiopedilum
- Paphiopedilum glaucophyllum, shiney green leaf paphiopedilum
- Paphiopedilum godefroyae, Godefroy's paphiopedilum
- Paphiopedilum haynaldianum, Haynald's paphiopedilum
- Paphiopedilum hennisianum, Hennis' paphiopedilum
- Paphiopedilum hookerae, Hooker's paphiopedilum
- Paphiopedilum insigne, splendid paphiopedilum
- Paphiopedilum javanicum, Java paphiopedilum
- Paphiopedilum lowii, Low's paphiopedilum
- Paphiopedilum malipoense, Malipo paphiopedilum
- Paphiopedilum mastersianum
- Paphiopedilum niveum, snow-white paphiopedilum
- Paphiopedilum papuanum, Papua paphiopedilum
- Paphiopedilum parishii, Parish's paphiopedilum
- Paphiopedilum randsii, Rands' paphiopedilum
- Paphiopedilum spicerianum, Spicer's paphiopedilum
- Paphiopedilum superbiens, outstanding paphiopedilum
- Paphiopedilum tigrinum, tiger striped paphiopedilum
- Paphiopedilum tonsum, bald paphiopedilum
- Paphiopedilum venustum, charming paphiopedilum
- Paphiopedilum violascens, shimmering purple paphiopedilum
- Paphiopedilum wardii, Ward's paphiopedilum
- Paphiopedilum wilhelminae, Wilhelminha's paphiopedium
- Phalaenopsis lindenii
- Phragmipedium besseae, Besse's phragmipedium
- Phragmipedium caudatum, tailed phragmipedium
- Phragmipedium hartwegii, Hartweg's phragmipedium
- Phragmipedium hirtzii, Hirtz' phragmipedium
- Phragmipedium klotzschianum, Klotsch's phragmipedium
- Phragmipedium sargentianum, Sargent's phragmipedium
- Phragmipedium schlimii, Schlimm's phragmipedium
- Physoceras boryanum
- Pityphyllum pinoides
- Platanthera micrantha
- Platanthera praeclara, western prairie fringed orchid
- Platanthera yosemitensis, Yosemite bog orchid
- Pleione forrestii
- Polystachya caudata
- Polystachya cooperi
- Polystachya disiformis
- Polystachya farinosa syn. Polystachya bifida
- Polystachya fischeri
- Polystachya geniculata
- Polystachya holstii
- Polystachya isochiloides
- Polystachya longiscapa
- Polystachya mazumbaiensis
- Polystachya praecipitis
- Polystachya pudorina
- Polystachya serpentina
- Polystachya shega
- Polystachya subdiphylla
- Polystachya superposita
- Polystachya teitensis
- Polystachya uluguruensis
- Polystachya xerophila
- Selenipedium aequinoctiale, equatorial occurring selenipedium
- Selenipedium chica, beautiful selenipedium
- Selenipedium dodsonii
- Selenipedium isabelianum, Isabel's selenipedium
- Selenipedium steyermarkii, Steyermark's selenipedium
- Smithorchis calceoliformis syn. Platanthera calceoliformis
- Spiranthes brevilabris, Texas ladies'-tresses
- Spiranthes delitescens, Canelo Hills ladies'-tresses
- Stolzia angustifolia
- Stolzia atrorubra
- Stolzia christopheri
- Stolzia leedalii
- Stolzia moniliformis
- Stolzia oligantha
- Stolzia viridis
- Trichoglottis tenuis
- Tridactyle brevifolia
- Tridactyle cruciformis
- Tridactyle minuta
- Tridactyle tanneri
- Triphora craigheadii, Craighead's noddingcaps
- Triphora yucatanensis
- Vanda javierae
- Vanda scandens
- Vanilla somai

Subspecies

- Disperis aphylla subsp. bifolia
- Habenaria stylites subsp. stylites
- Polystachya albescens subsp. angustifolia
- Polystachya caespitifica subsp. caespitifica

Varieties

- Myrmecophila thomsoniana var. minor
- Myrmecophila thomsoniana var. thomsoniana

==== Other Asparagales species ====
- Astelia argyrocoma
- Hypoxidia maheensis

=== Bromeliales ===
- Aechmea kentii
- Aechmea kleinii
- Aechmea manzanaresiana
- Aechmea tayoensis
- Bromelia nidus-puellae
- Dyckia reitzii
- Encholirium luxor
- Gregbrownia fulgens syn. Mezobromelia fulgens
- Guzmania albescens
- Guzmania alcantareoides
- Guzmania condorensis
- Guzmania ecuadorensis
- Guzmania fuerstenbergiana
- Guzmania fuquae
- Guzmania henniae
- Guzmania osyana
- Guzmania roseiflora
- Guzmania rubrolutea
- Hohenbergiopsis guatemalensis
- Neoregelia azevedoi
- Pitcairnia aequatorialis
- Pitcairnia alata
- Pitcairnia alexanderi syn. Pepinia alexanderi
- Pitcairnia bergii
- Pitcairnia caduciflora
- Pitcairnia clarkii
- Pitcairnia hooveri syn. Pepinia hooveri
- Pitcairnia lutescens
- Pitcairnia oblongifolia
- Pitcairnia poeppigiana
- Pitcairnia reflexiflora
- Puya angelensis
- Puya castellanosii
- Puya parviflora
- Puya raimondii, queen of the Andes
- Puya roseana
- Racinaea inconspicua
- Racinaea tripinnata
- Rokautskyia pseudoscaposa syn. Cryptanthus pseudoscaposus
- Ronnbergia campanulata
- Tillandsia acosta-solisii
- Tillandsia cernua
- Tillandsia demissa
- Tillandsia homostachya
- Tillandsia indigofera
- Tillandsia nervisepala
- Tillandsia pachyaxon
- Tillandsia polyantha
- Tillandsia portillae
- Tillandsia pseudomontana
- Tillandsia rubroviolacea
- Tillandsia umbellata
- Tillandsia zarumensis
- Vriesea appendiculata
- Vriesea drewii
- Vriesea petraea
- Vriesea strobeliae
- Werauhia diantha

=== Commelinales ===
- Commelina zigzag
- Cyanotis cupricola
- Floscopa mannii
- Xyris calostachys
- Xyris pancheri

=== Cyclanthales ===
- Asplundia domingensis
- Asplundia nonoensis
- Asplundia truncata
- Dicranopygium campii
- Dicranopygium coma-pyrrhae

=== Dioscoreales ===
- Afrothismia winkleri
- Dioscorea chimborazensis
- Dioscorea choriandra
- Gymnosiphon usambaricus

=== Eriocaulales ===
- Eriocaulon anshiense
- Eriocaulon australasicum, austral pipewort
- Eriocaulon dalzellii
- Eriocaulon richardianum
- Eriocaulon selousii
- Eriocaulon stipantepalum

=== Liliales ===
==== Liliaceae ====
- Fritillaria conica
- Fritillaria epirotica
- Fritillaria falcata, talus fritillary
- Fritillaria kaiensis
- Fritillaria obliqua
- Fritillaria rhodocanakis
- Gagea dayana
- Gagea elliptica
- Lilium ciliatum, ciliate lily
- Tulipa cypria

==== Other Liliales species ====
- Androcymbium rechingeri
- Bomarea ceratophora
- Bomarea chimborazensis
- Bomarea uncifolia
- Colchicum mirzoevae, Mirzoeva's merendera
- Iphigenia stellata

=== Pandanales ===
- Pandanus lacuum

=== Poales ===
==== Cyperaceae ====
- Bulbostylis bodardii
- Bulbostylis guineensis
- Carex azuayae
- Carex bermudiana, Bermuda sedge
- Carex fissirostris
- Carex kauaiensis
- Carex toreadora
- Cyperus afrodunensis
- Cyperus felicis
- Cyperus pennatiformis
- Fimbristylis crystallina
- Fimbristylis dauciformis
- Hypolytrum cacuminum
- Hypolytrum pseudomapanioides
- Kyllinga pluristaminea
- Rhynchospora modesti-lucennoi
- Scleria afroreflexa
- Uncinia lacustris

==== Juncaceae ====
- Juncus bufonius subsp. mogadorensis

==== Poaceae ====
- Agropyron cimmericum, Kerch wheatgrass
- Agropyron dasyanthum, edge flowered crested wheatgrass
- Agrostis trachychlaena
- Ancistrachne numaeensis
- Andropogon lanuginosus
- Andropogon scabriglumis
- Bothriochloa campii
- Calamagrostis brevipaleata
- Calamagrostis hillebrandii
- Calamagrostis parsana
- Dimeria hohenackeri
- Dinochloa prunifera
- Eragrostis pseudopoa
- Eragrostis saxatilis
- Festuca densipaniculata
- Festuca pontica, Pontic fescue
- Festuca xenophontis, fescue
- Hickelia africana
- Isachne swaminathanii
- Ischaemum vembanadense
- Leptochloa ginae
- Limnopoa meeboldii
- Micropyropsis tuberosa
- Muhlenbergia palmirensis
- Neurolepis elata
- Oryza neocaledonica
- Panicum acostia
- Panicum nudiflorum
- Paspalum azuayense
- Paspalum soboliferum
- Pentameris ecklonii
- Pharus ecuadoricus
- Poa riphaea
- Pseudarrhenatherum pallens
- Stipa styriaca
- Stipa veneta
- Uniola condensata

=== Zingiberales ===
- Amomum celsum
- Amomum stephanocoleum
- Calathea anulque
- Calathea chimboracensis
- Calathea hagbergii
- Calathea ischnosiphonoides
- Calathea libbyana
- Calathea roseobracteata
- Costus nitidus
- Costus zamoranus
- Curcuma caulina
- Curcuma coriacea
- Globba colpicola
- Globba laeta
- Marantochloa mildbraedii
- Monotagma rudanii
- Newmania orthostachys
- Sarcophrynium villosum
- Siliquamomum oreodoxa
- Zingiber monophyllum

== See also ==
- List of critically endangered plants
- List of data deficient plants
- Lists of IUCN Red List endangered species
- List of least concern plants
- List of near threatened plants
- List of recently extinct plants
- List of vulnerable plants
