= Tsaiorchis keiskeoides =

Scientific classification
- Kingdom: Plantae
- Clade: Tracheophytes
- Clade: Angiosperms
- Clade: Monocots
- Order: Asparagales
- Family: Orchidaceae
- Subfamily: Orchidoideae
- Genus: Tsaiorchis
- Species: T. keiskeoides

Binomial name
- Tsaiorchis keiskeoides (Gagnep.) X.H.Jin, Schuit. & W.T.Jin

Synonyms
- Habenaria keiskeoides Gagnep.; Amitostigma keiskeoides (Gagnep.) Garay & Kittr.

Species of flowering plant

Tsaiorchis keiskeoides is a species of flowering plant in the family Orchidaceae, native to northern Vietnam.

== Taxonomy ==
The species was first described in 1931 by François Gagnepain, as Habenaria keiskeoides. It was transferred to the genus Amitostigma in 1985. A molecular phylogenetic study in 2014 treated Habenaria keiskoides as synonymous with Tsaiorchis neottianthoides. Although Tsaiorchis was shown to be close to some other genera, including Ponerorchis when expanded to include Amitostigma, it was regarded as sufficiently distinct to be maintained as a separate genus. Sources such as the World Checklist of Selected Plant Families treat Tsaiorchis keiskeoides as a distinct species from Tsaiorchis neottianthoides.
