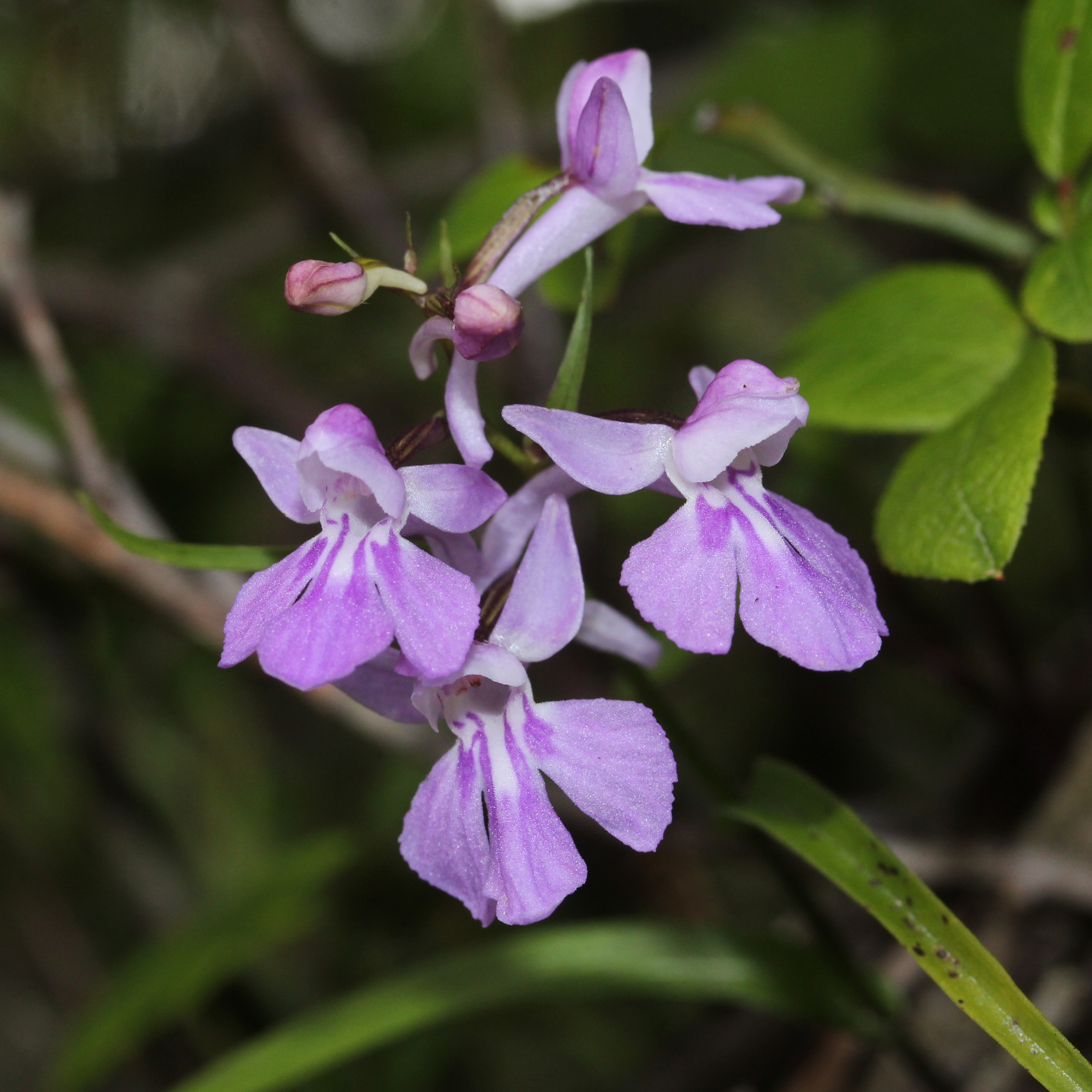
- On Mount Gozaisho, Japan

Scientific classification
- Kingdom: Plantae
- Clade: Tracheophytes
- Clade: Angiosperms
- Clade: Monocots
- Order: Asparagales
- Family: Orchidaceae
- Subfamily: Orchidoideae
- Genus: Hemipilia
- Species: H. graminifolia

Binomial name
- Hemipilia graminifolia (Rchb.f.) Y.Tang, H.Peng & T.Yukawa

Synonyms
- Gymnadenia graminifolia (Rchb.f.) Rchb.f.; Orchis graminifolia (Rchb.f.) Tang & F.T.Wang; Ponerorchis graminifolia Rchb.f.

= Hemipilia graminifolia =

Species of flowering plant

Hemipilia graminifolia is a species of flowering plant in the family Orchidaceae, native to southern Korea and Japan. It is a short herbaceous perennial, growing from a tuber, with small flowers in shades of pink to purple. Many varieties and cultivars are grown in Japan as ornamental plants.

== Description ==
Hemipilia graminifolia is a short herbaceous perennial growing from an ovoid tuber. It reaches a height of 10–15 cm (less often 25 cm). It has two to four linear leaves, 7–15 cm long. The inflorescence is a raceme containing 2–15 flowers. Each flower is about 15 mm across, pink to purplish overall. The upper sepal and the lateral petals form a "helmet". The lip or labellum is about 13 mm long, deeply divided into three broad lobes. A spur is present, 10–15 mm long, shorter than the ovary.

Variation in flowers among varieties and cultivars
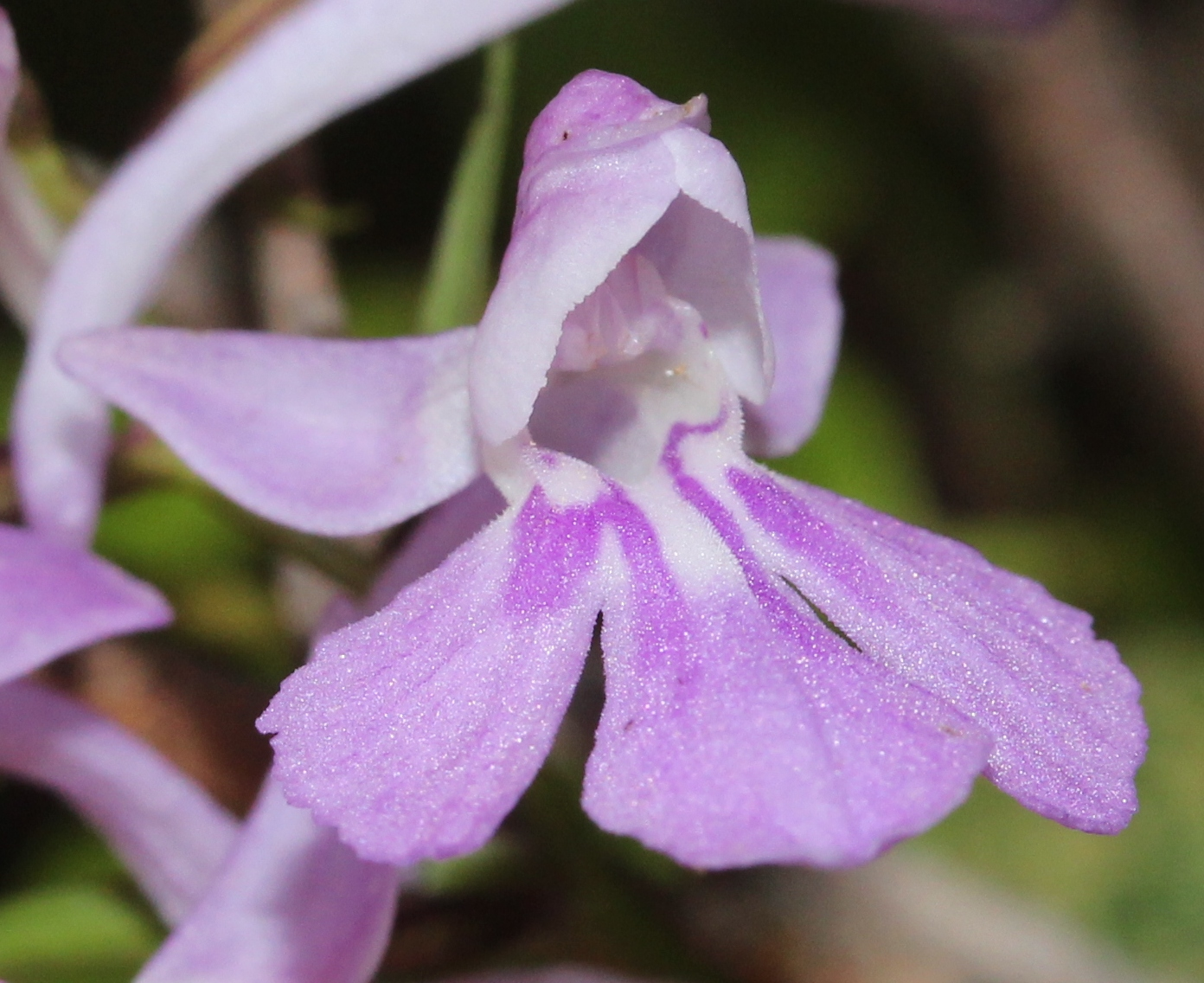

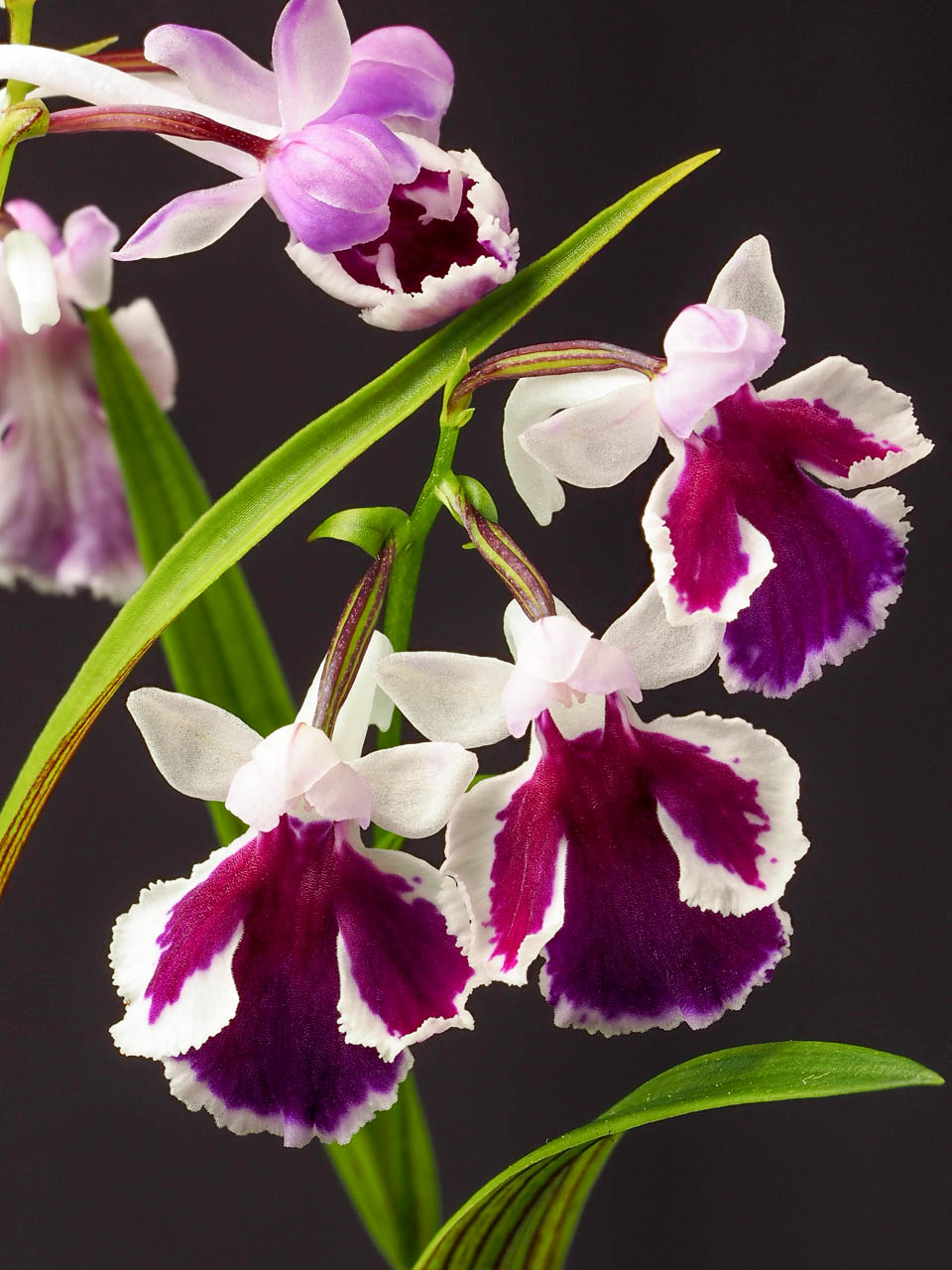

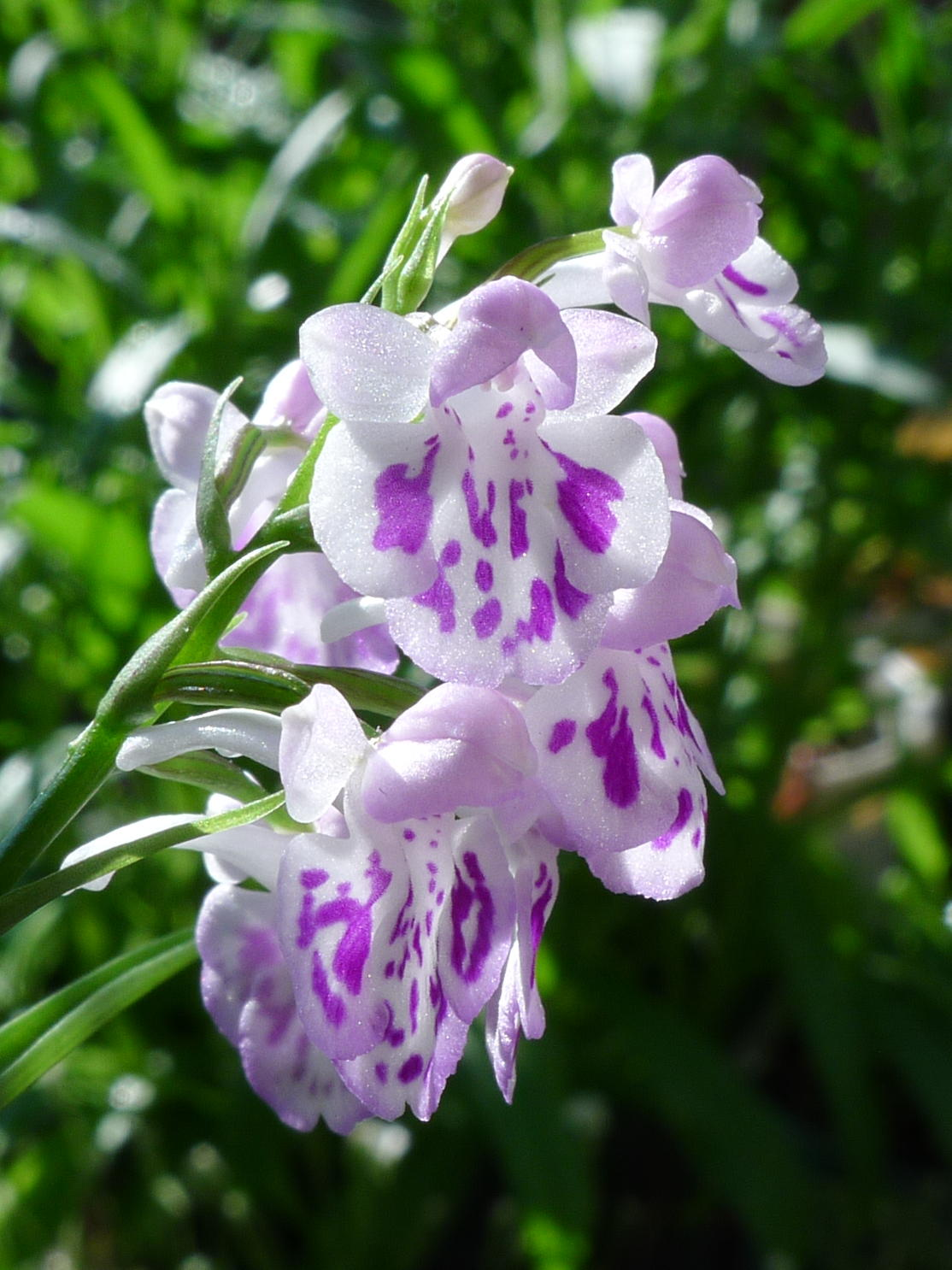

== Taxonomy ==
Hemipilia graminifolia was first described in 1852, by Heinrich Gustav Reichenbach. The specific epithet graminifolia means "grass-leaved".

As of June 2024, two varieties are recognized:

- Ponerorchis graminifolia var. graminifolia – Japan and Korea
- Ponerorchis graminifolia var. suzukiana (Ohwi) Y.Tang, H.Peng & T.Yukawa – Japan; more and larger leaves (4–6); pale reddish purple flowers

== Distribution and habitat ==
Hemipilia graminifolia is native to southern Korea and south-central and southern Japan (Honshu, Shikoku and Kyushu). It grows in mountainous areas, particularly among damp rocks.

== Cultivation ==
Hemipilia graminifolia is cultivated as an ornamental plant, particularly in Japan, where many cultivars have been described with widely differing flower colours and markings, from pure white to darkish purple, with or without spots and markings. In Britain, they can be grown in pots in a gritty compost. Without forcing, they then come into growth in early spring, flower in late spring and early summer, dying down before the autumn, after which they are kept dry and frost-free over winter. Propagation is via tuber division or seed.

Hybrids with Hemipilia gracilis have been reported to be in cultivation.
