= Ponerorchis papilionacea =

Scientific classification
- Kingdom: Plantae
- Clade: Tracheophytes
- Clade: Angiosperms
- Clade: Monocots
- Order: Asparagales
- Family: Orchidaceae
- Subfamily: Orchidoideae
- Genus: Ponerorchis
- Species: P. papilionacea

Binomial name
- Ponerorchis papilionacea (Tang, F.T.Wang & K.Y.Lang) X.H.Jin, Schuit. & W.T.Jin

Synonyms
- Amitostigma papilionaceum Tang, F.T.Wang & K.Y.Lang

Species of flowering plant

Ponerorchis papilionacea is a species of flowering plant in the family Orchidaceae, native to south-central China (north-west Sichuan). Plants of the World Online considers it an unplaced taxon – "names that cannot be accepted, nor can they be put into synonymy."

== Taxonomy ==
The species was first described in 1982 as Amitostigma papilionaceum. A molecular phylogenetic study in 2014 found that species of Amitostigma, Neottianthe and Ponerorchis were mixed together in a single clade, making none of the three genera monophyletic as then circumscribed. Amitostigma and Neottianthe were subsumed into Ponerorchis, with this species becoming Ponerorchis papilionacea. The genus Ponerorchis has now been synonymized with the genus Hemipilia, but the species name is now considered unplaced.
