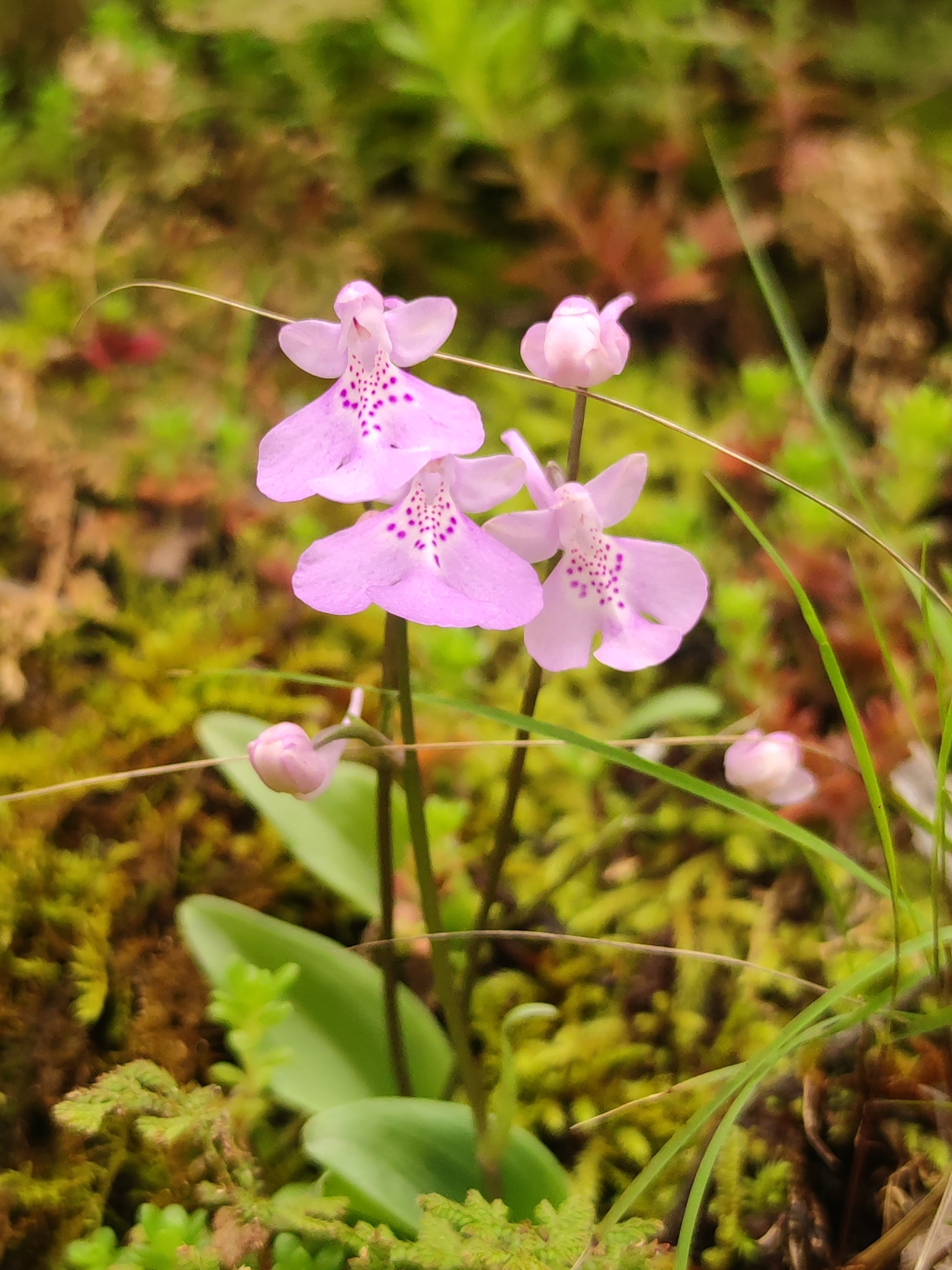

Scientific classification
- Kingdom: Plantae
- Clade: Tracheophytes
- Clade: Angiosperms
- Clade: Monocots
- Order: Asparagales
- Family: Orchidaceae
- Subfamily: Orchidoideae
- Subtribe: Orchidinae
- Genus: Hemipilia; X.H.Jin, Lu Q.Huang, W.T.Jin & X.G.Xiang
- Species: H. pinguicula

Binomial name
- Hemipilia pinguicula (Rchb.f. & S.Moore) Y.Tang & H.Peng

Synonyms
- Species: Amitostigma pinguicula (Rchb.f. & S.Moore) Schltr.; Gymnadenia pinguicula Rchb.f. & S.Moore; Habenaria pinguicula (Rchb.f. & S.Moore) Benth.; Orchis pinguicula (Rchb.f. & S.Moore) Soó; Ponerorchis pinguicula (Rchb.f. & S.Moore) X.H.Jin, Schuit. & W.T.Jin; Shizhenia pinguicula (Rchb.f. & S.Moore) X.H.Jin, Lu Q.Huang, W.T.Jin & X.G.Xiang; Diplomeris chinensis Rolfe

= Hemipilia pinguicula =

Genus of flowering plants

Hemipilia pinguicula is a species of flowering plant in the family Orchidaceae. It is native to south-eastern China (north-eastern Zhejiang).

== Description ==
Hemipilia pinguicula grows from an ovoid shaped tuber. It has a single stem leaf, situated near the base of the stem. The inflorescence consists of a single relatively large flower, rose-red to purple in colour, with a three-lobed lip (labellum). The upper sepal and the lateral petals are grouped to form a hood. The flower has a conical spur, longer than the lip. There are two stigmas that extend under the short rostellum.

== Taxonomy ==
The species was first described in 1878 as Gymnadenia pinguicula. It was later transferred again to Habenaria and then Amitostigma. A molecular phylogenetic study in 2014, found that species of Amitostigma, Neottianthe and Ponerorchis were mixed together in a single clade, making none of the three genera monophyletic as then circumscribed. Amitostigma and Neottianthe were subsumed into Ponerorchis, with Amitostigma pinguicula becoming Ponerorchis pinguicula. Later studies suggested that Ponerorchis pinguicula lay outside the main clade consisting of Hemipilia, Ponerorchis, Sirindhornia, and Tsaiorchis, and a new genus, Shizhenia, was created for it. After some adjustment of the generic boundaries, the genus Shizhenia was synonymized with the genus Hemipilia.
