= Orchis gracilis =

Orchis gracilis may refer to three different species of plants:

- Orchis gracilis (Blume) Soó, a taxonomic synonym for delicate amitostigma, Hemipilia gracilis
- Orchis gracilis Fisch. ex Lindl., a taxonomic synonym for Aleutian bog orchid, Platanthera tipuloides
- Orchis gracilis Höppner, a taxonomic synonym for a subspecies of the narrow-leaved marsh orchid, Dactylorhiza traunsteineri subsp. lapponica
