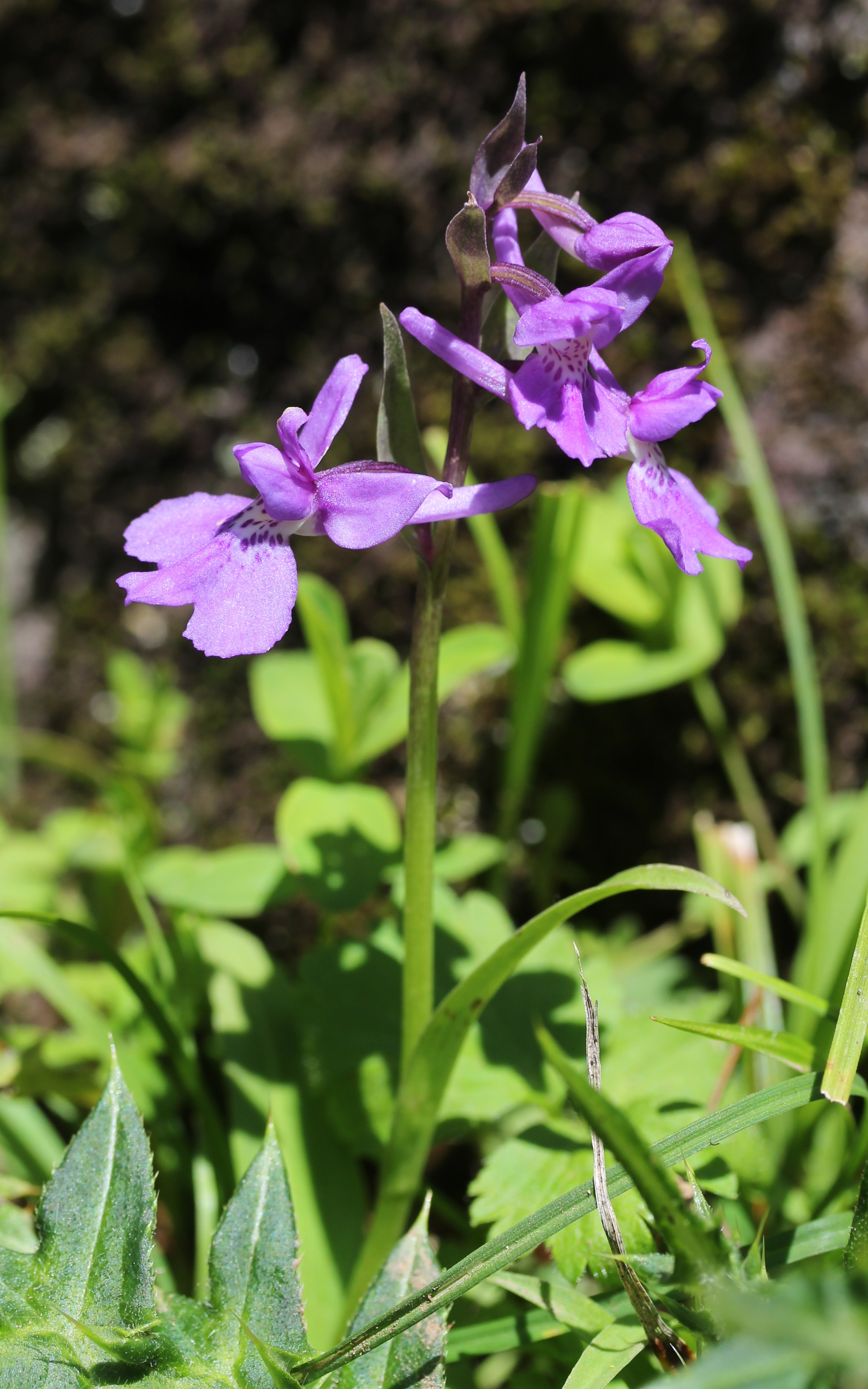
- On Mount Hijiri, Japan

Scientific classification
- Kingdom: Plantae
- Clade: Tracheophytes
- Clade: Angiosperms
- Clade: Monocots
- Order: Asparagales
- Family: Orchidaceae
- Subfamily: Orchidoideae
- Genus: Hemipilia
- Species: H. joo-iokiana

Binomial name
- Hemipilia joo-iokiana (Makino) Y.Tang, H.Peng & T.Yukawa

Synonyms
- Chusua joo-iokiana (Makino) P.F.Hunt; Orchis joo-iokiana Makino; Ponerorchis joo-iokiana (Makino) Nakai; Ponerorchis pauciflora var. joo-iokiana (Makino) Ohwi; Orchis joo-iokiana var. coreana Ohwi; Orchis matsumurana Schltr.; Ponerorchis joo-iokiana var. coreana (Ohwi) Soó

= Hemipilia joo-iokiana =

Species of flowering plant

Hemipilia joo-iokiana is a species of flowering plant in the family Orchidaceae, native to northern Korea and Japan (central Honshu).

== Description ==
Hemipilia joo-iokiana is a herbaceous perennial growing from an ovoid tuber. It reaches a height of 10–30 cm. It has one to three leaves, 4–8 cm long, with bases that surround the stem. The inflorescence consists of a few flowers arranged loosely rather than in a dense spike. Each flower is about 20 mm across, reddish purple overall. The upper (dorsal) sepal is about 10 mm long. The lip or labellum is about 15 mm long, divided into three relatively broad lobes, the middle one being the longest and sometimes further divided. A spur is present, 15–20 mm long, longer than the ovary.

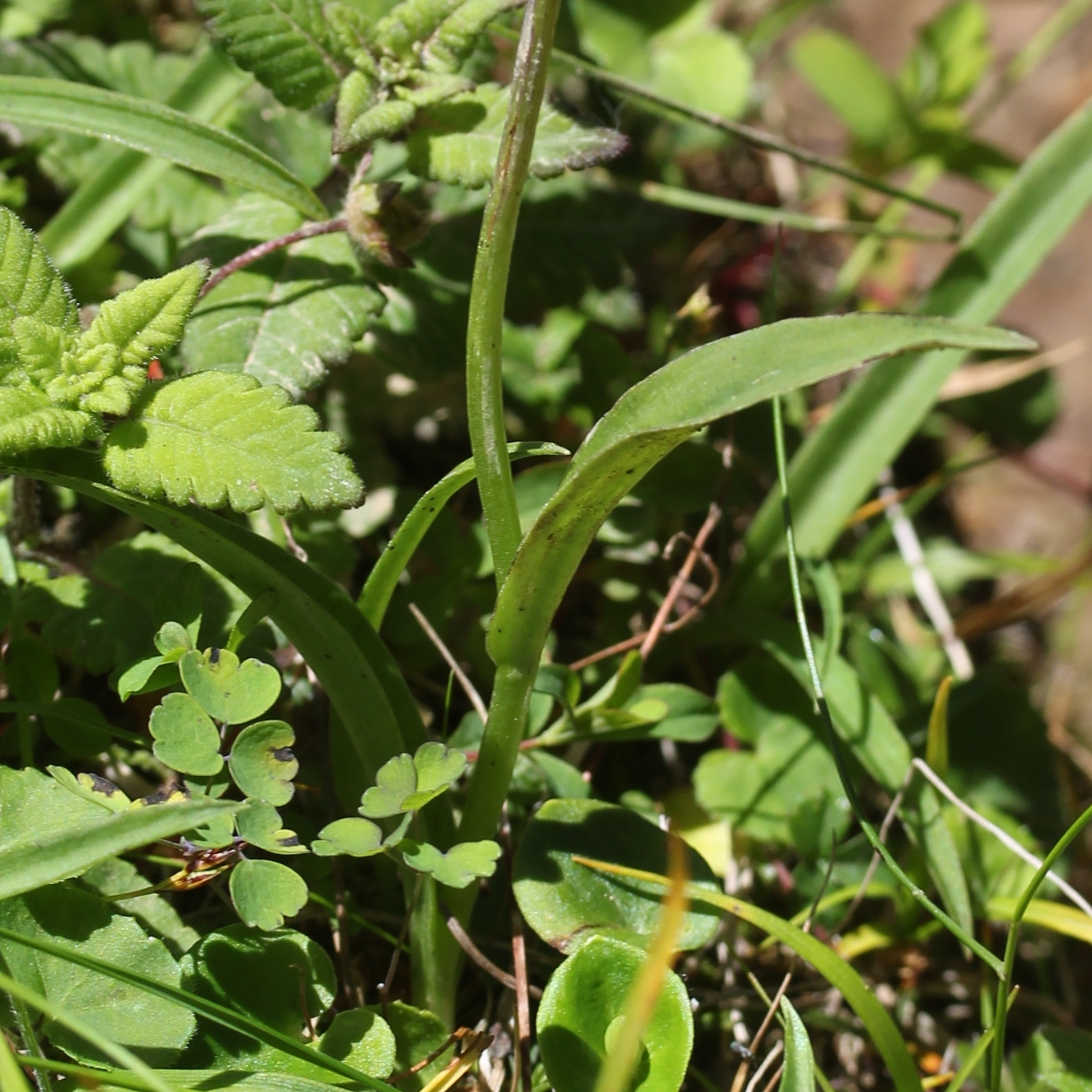
Leaves

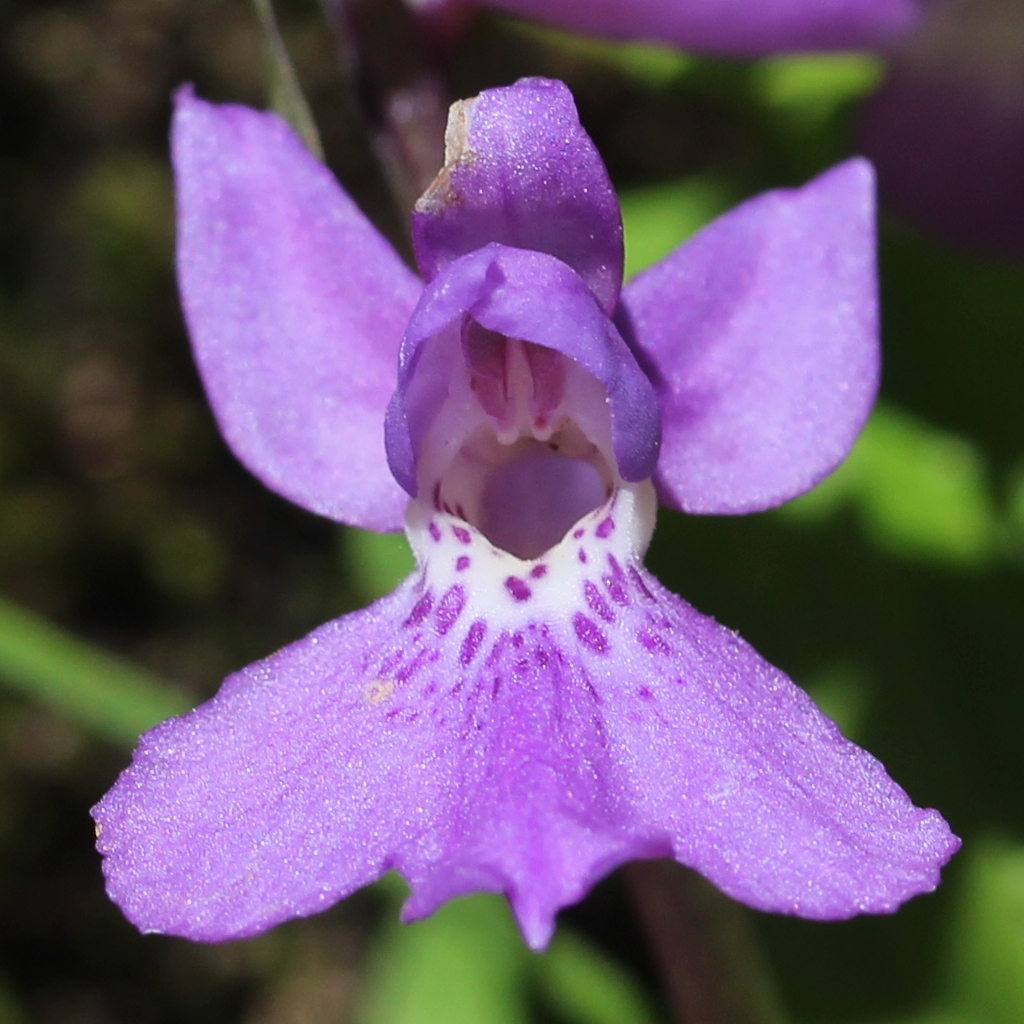
Flower

== Taxonomy ==
Hemipilia joo-iokiana was first described by Tomitaro Makino in 1902, as Orchis joo-iokiana. It was later transferred to Chusua and then to Ponerorchis. A molecular phylogenetic study in 2015 suggested that it formed a related group of species with H. alpestris, H. kiraishiensis, H. sichuanica and H. chusua and was not closely related to other Hemipilia species from Japan. The genus Ponerorchis has since been synonymized with the genus Hemipilia, resulting in the present name.

== Distribution and habitat ==
Hemipilia joo-iokiana is native to the north of Korea and to Honshu in Japan (the Chubu and Kanto regions). In Japan it is found in the subalpine zone, in open grassland.
