= G. gracilis =

G. gracilis may refer to:

- Galaxias gracilis, the dwarf inanga, a freshwater fish found in the North Island of New Zealand
- Galeus gracilis, the slender sawtail catshark, a shark found off northern Australia
- Galphimia gracilis, a plant species native to eastern Mexico
- Gastrocyathus gracilis, the New Zealand slender clingfish, a fish species
- Gastrotheca gracilis, a frog species found in Argentina and possibly Bolivia
- Gentianella gracilis, a plant species endemic to Ecuador
- Goodea gracilis, a fish species endemic to Mexico

== Synonyms ==
- Gymnadenia gracilis var. keiskei, a synonym for Amitostigma keiskei, an orchid species

== See also ==
- Gracilis (disambiguation)
