= Hemipilia bifoliata =

Conservation status
- Endangered (IUCN 3.1)

Scientific classification
- Kingdom: Plantae
- Clade: Tracheophytes
- Clade: Angiosperms
- Clade: Monocots
- Order: Asparagales
- Family: Orchidaceae
- Subfamily: Orchidoideae
- Genus: Hemipilia
- Species: H. bifoliata

Binomial name
- Hemipilia bifoliata (Tang & F.T.Wang) Y.Tang & H.Peng

Synonyms
- Amitostigma bifoliatum Tang & F.T.Wang; Ponerorchis bifoliata (Tang & F.T.Wang) X.H.Jin, Schuit. & W.T.Jin

Species of orchid

Hemipilia bifoliata is a species of plant in the family Orchidaceae. It is endemic to China, where it is known from Gansu and Sichuan. It produces pale purple flowers.

== Taxonomy ==
The species was first described in 1936 by Tsin Tang and Fa Tsuan Wang, as Amitostigma bifoliatum. A molecular phylogenetic study in 2014 found that species of Amitostigma, Neottianthe and Ponerorchis were mixed together in a single clade, making none of the three genera monophyletic as then circumscribed. Amitostigma and Neottianthe were subsumed into Ponerorchis, with this species then becoming Ponerorchis bifoliata. The genus Ponerorchis has since been synonymized with the genus Hemipilia, resulting in the present name.
