= Hemipilia compacta =

Scientific classification
- Kingdom: Plantae
- Clade: Tracheophytes
- Clade: Angiosperms
- Clade: Monocots
- Order: Asparagales
- Family: Orchidaceae
- Subfamily: Orchidoideae
- Genus: Hemipilia
- Species: H. compacta

Binomial name
- Hemipilia compacta (Schltr.) Y.Tang & H.Peng

Synonyms
- Neottianthe compacta Schltr.; Ponerorchis compacta (Schltr.) X.H.Jin, Schuit. & W.T.Jin

Species of flowering plant

Hemipilia compacta is a species of flowering plant in the family Orchidaceae, native to south-central China (western Sichuan).

== Taxonomy ==
The species was first described in 1924 by Rudolf Schlechter, as Neottianthe compacta. A molecular phylogenetic study in 2014 found that species of Neottianthe, Amitostigma and Ponerorchis were mixed together in a single clade, making none of the three genera monophyletic as then circumscribed. Neottianthe and Amitostigma were subsumed into Ponerorchis, with this species then becoming Ponerorchis compacta. The genus Ponerorchis has since been synonymized with the genus Hemipilia, resulting in the present name.
