= Hemipilia gonggashanica =

Scientific classification
- Kingdom: Plantae
- Clade: Tracheophytes
- Clade: Angiosperms
- Clade: Monocots
- Order: Asparagales
- Family: Orchidaceae
- Subfamily: Orchidoideae
- Genus: Hemipilia
- Species: H. gonggashanica

Binomial name
- Hemipilia gonggashanica (K.Y.Lang) Y.Tang & H.Peng

Synonyms
- Amitostigma gonggashanicum K.Y.Lang; Ponerorchis gonggashanica (K.Y.Lang) X.H.Jin, Schuit. & W.T.Jin

Species of flowering plant

Hemipilia gonggashanica is a species of flowering plant in the family Orchidaceae, native to south-central China (south-western Sichuan).

== Taxonomy ==
The species was first described in 1984 by Kai Yung Lang, as Amitostigma gonggashanicum. A molecular phylogenetic study in 2014 found that species of Amitostigma, Neottianthe and Ponerorchis were mixed together in a single clade, making none of the three genera monophyletic as then circumscribed. Amitostigma and Neottianthe were subsumed into Ponerorchis, with this species then becoming Ponerorchis gonggashanica. The genus Ponerorchis has since been synonymized with the genus Hemipilia, resulting in the present name.
