= Hemipilia henryi =

Conservation status
- Endangered (IUCN 3.1)

Scientific classification
- Kingdom: Plantae
- Clade: Tracheophytes
- Clade: Angiosperms
- Clade: Monocots
- Order: Asparagales
- Family: Orchidaceae
- Subfamily: Orchidoideae
- Genus: Hemipilia
- Species: H. henryi

Binomial name
- Hemipilia henryi Rolfe

Synonyms
- Hemipilia cordifolia var. cuneata Finet; Hemipilia cuneata (Finet) Schltr.; Hemipilia amesiana Schltr.

Species of flowering plant

Hemipilia henryi is an endangered species of plant in the family Orchidaceae native to the Hubei and Sichuan provinces of China.
