= Hemipilia thailandica =

Scientific classification
- Kingdom: Plantae
- Clade: Tracheophytes
- Clade: Angiosperms
- Clade: Monocots
- Order: Asparagales
- Family: Orchidaceae
- Subfamily: Orchidoideae
- Genus: Hemipilia
- Species: H. thailandica

Binomial name
- Hemipilia thailandica (Seidenf. & Thaithong) Y.Tang & H.Peng

Synonyms
- Amitostigma thailandicum Seidenf. & Thaithong; Ponerorchis thailandica (Seidenf. & Thaithong) X.H.Jin, Schuit. & W.T.Jin

Species of flowering plant

Hemipilia thailandica is a species of flowering plant in the family Orchidaceae, native to northern Thailand.

== Taxonomy ==
The species was first described in 1997 as Amitostigma thailandicum. A molecular phylogenetic study in 2014 found that species of Amitostigma, Neottianthe and Ponerorchis were mixed together in a single clade, making none of the three genera monophyletic as then circumscribed. Amitostigma and Neottianthe were subsumed into Ponerorchis, with this species then becoming Ponerorchis thailandica. The genus Ponerorchis has since been synonymized with the genus Hemipilia, resulting in the present name.
