= Hemipilia yueana =

Conservation status
- Endangered (IUCN 3.1)

Scientific classification
- Kingdom: Plantae
- Clade: Tracheophytes
- Clade: Angiosperms
- Clade: Monocots
- Order: Asparagales
- Family: Orchidaceae
- Subfamily: Orchidoideae
- Genus: Hemipilia
- Species: H. yueana

Binomial name
- Hemipilia yueana (Tang & F.T.Wang) Y.Tang & H.Peng

Synonyms
- Amitostigma yueanum Tang & F.T.Wang; Amitostigma yuanum Tang & F.T.Wang; Ponerorchis yueana (Tang & F.T.Wang) X.H.Jin, Schuit. & W.T.Jin

Species of orchid

Hemipilia yueana is a species of plant in the family Orchidaceae. It is endemic to China, where it is known from Sichuan and Yunnan. It produces pink or white flowers. The epithet is also spelt "yuana".

== Taxonomy ==
As of March 2014, there were discrepancies in the spelling of the specific epithet. The World Checklist of Selected Plant Families and the International Plant Names Index spell it "yueanum", noting that the original description used the form "yüanum". The Flora of China and the authors who moved it to the genus Ponerorchis spell it "yuanum". Other sources are divided between these two spellings.

The species was first described in 1912 by Tsin Tang and Fa Tsuan Wang, as Amitostigma yueanum. A molecular phylogenetic study in 2014, in which this species was included, found that species of Amitostigma, Neottianthe and Ponerorchis were mixed together in a single clade, making none of the three genera monophyletic as then circumscribed. Amitostigma and Neottianthe were subsumed into Ponerorchis, with this species then becoming Ponerorchis yueana. The genus Ponerorchis has since been synonymized with the genus Hemipilia, resulting in the present name.
