= Hemipilia crassicalcarata =

Conservation status
- Endangered (IUCN 3.1)

Scientific classification
- Kingdom: Plantae
- Clade: Tracheophytes
- Clade: Angiosperms
- Clade: Monocots
- Order: Asparagales
- Family: Orchidaceae
- Subfamily: Orchidoideae
- Genus: Hemipilia
- Species: H. crassicalcarata

Binomial name
- Hemipilia crassicalcarata S.S.Chien

Synonyms
- Hemipilia silvestrii Pamp.

Species of flowering plant

Hemipilia crassicalcarata is a species of flowering plant in the family Orchidaceae. It is a tuberous geophyte endemic to China, where it is native to Sichuan, Shaanxi, and southeastern Shanxi provinces.
