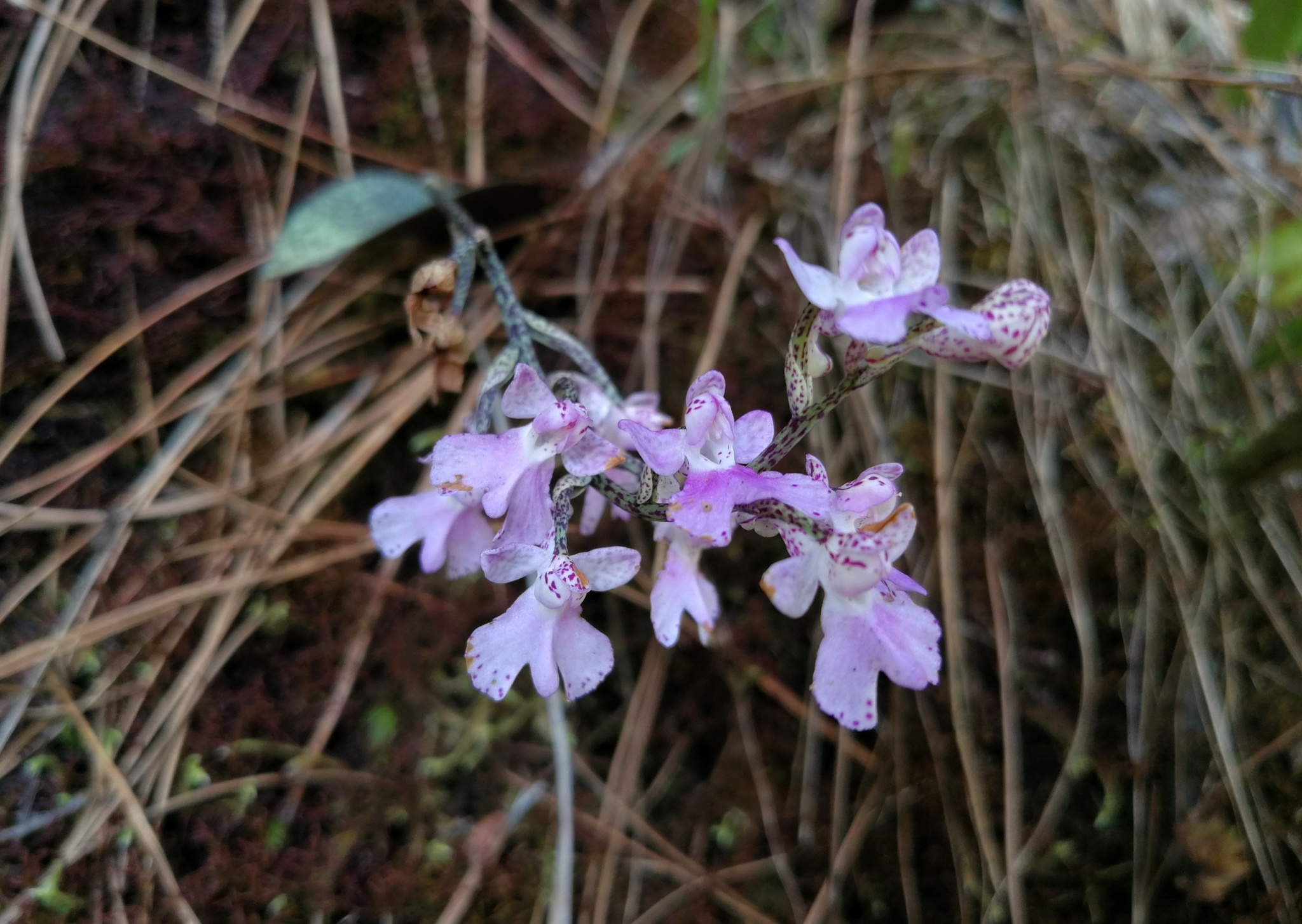

Scientific classification
- Kingdom: Plantae
- Clade: Tracheophytes
- Clade: Angiosperms
- Clade: Monocots
- Order: Asparagales
- Family: Orchidaceae
- Subfamily: Orchidoideae
- Genus: Hemipilia
- Species: H. purpureopunctata

Binomial name
- Hemipilia purpureopunctata (K.Y.Lang) X.H.Jin, Schuit. & W.T.Jin

Synonyms
- Habenaria purpureopunctata K.Y.Lang; Hemipiliopsis purpureopunctata (K.Y.Lang) Y.B.Luo & S.C.Chen

= Hemipilia purpureopunctata =

Species of orchid

Hemipilia purpureopunctata is a terrestrial orchid native to high elevations (2100–3400 m) in the eastern Himalayas and Tibet.

== Taxonomy ==
The species was first described by Kai Yung Lang in 1978, as Habenaria purpureopunctata. It was placed in the monotypic genus Hemipiliopsis in 2003. On the basis of molecular phylogenetic studies, in 2014, Hemipiliopsis was subsumed into Hemipilia, with the species becoming Hemipilia purpureopunctata.
