= Hemipilia physoceras =

Scientific classification
- Kingdom: Plantae
- Clade: Tracheophytes
- Clade: Angiosperms
- Clade: Monocots
- Order: Asparagales
- Family: Orchidaceae
- Subfamily: Orchidoideae
- Genus: Hemipilia
- Species: H. physoceras

Binomial name
- Hemipilia physoceras (Schltr.) Y.Tang & H.Peng

Synonyms
- Amitostigma physoceras Schltr.; Orchis physoceras (Schltr.) Soó; Ponerorchis physoceras (Schltr.) X.H.Jin, Schuit. & W.T.Jin

Species of flowering plant

Hemipilia physoceras is a species of flowering plant in the family Orchidaceae, native to south-central China (north-western and western Sichuan).

== Taxonomy ==
The species was first described in 1924 by Rudolf Schlechter, as Amitostigma physoceras. A molecular phylogenetic study in 2014 found that species of Amitostigma, Neottianthe and Ponerorchis were mixed together in a single clade, making none of the three genera monophyletic as then circumscribed. Amitostigma and Neottianthe were subsumed into Ponerorchis, with this species then becoming Ponerorchis physoceras. The genus Ponerorchis has since been synonymized with the genus Hemipilia, resulting in the present name.
