= Hemipilia luteola =

Scientific classification
- Kingdom: Plantae
- Clade: Tracheophytes
- Clade: Angiosperms
- Clade: Monocots
- Order: Asparagales
- Family: Orchidaceae
- Subfamily: Orchidoideae
- Genus: Hemipilia
- Species: H. luteola

Binomial name
- Hemipilia luteola (K.Y.Lang & S.C.Chen) Y.Tang & H.Peng

Synonyms
- Neottianthe luteola K.Y.Lang & S.C.Chen; Ponerorchis luteola (K.Y.Lang & S.C.Chen) X.H.Jin, Schuit. & W.T.Jin

Species of flowering plant

Hemipilia luteola is a species of flowering plant in the family Orchidaceae, native to south-central China (north-western Yunnan).

== Taxonomy ==
The species was first described in 1996 as Neottianthe luteola. A molecular phylogenetic study in 2014 found that species of Neottianthe, Amitostigma and Ponerorchis were mixed together in a single clade, making none of the three genera monophyletic as then circumscribed. Neottianthe and Amitostigma were subsumed into Ponerorchis, with this species then becoming Ponerorchis luteola. The genus Ponerorchis has since been synonymized with the genus Hemipilia, resulting in the present name.
