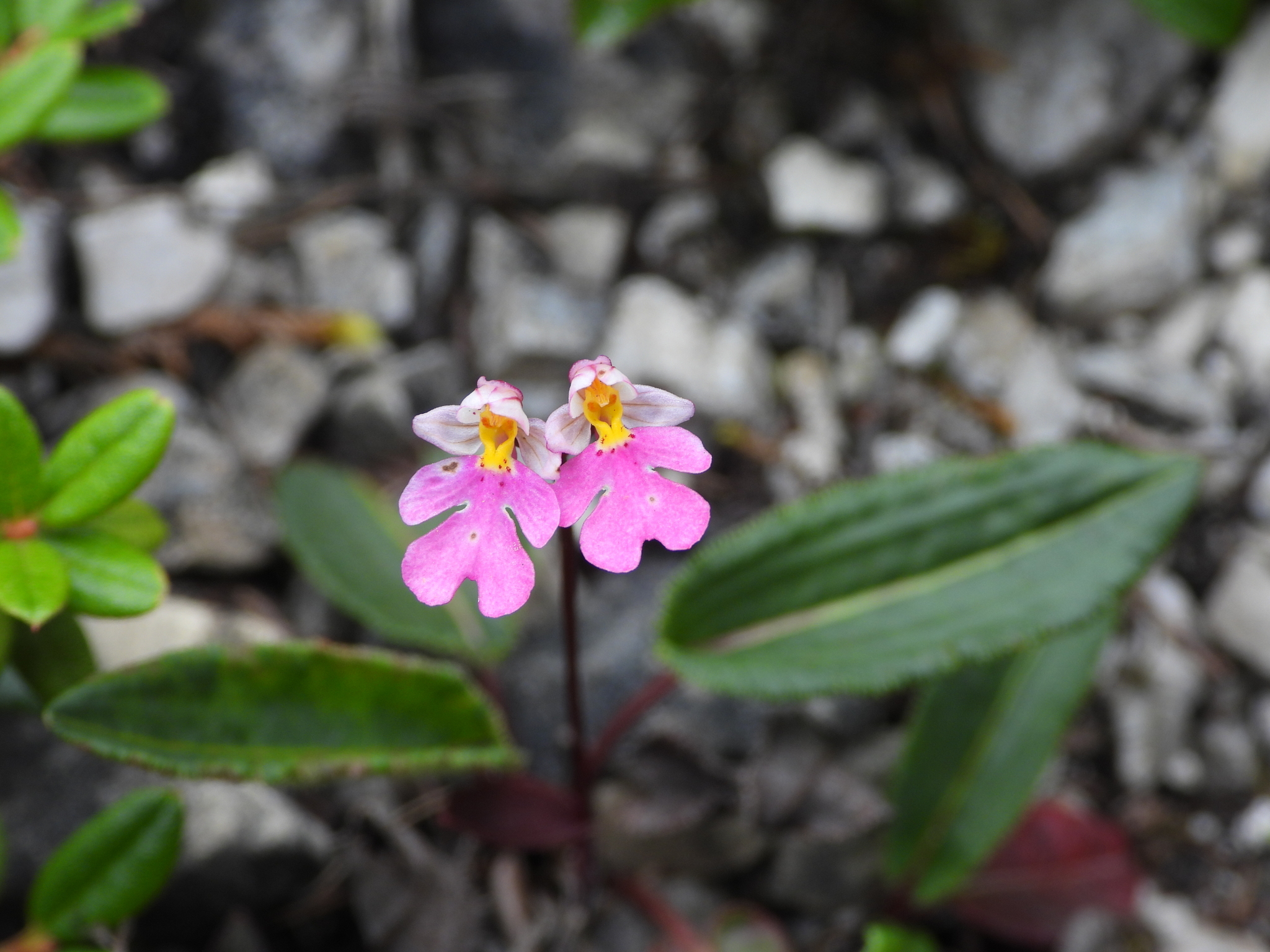

Scientific classification
- Kingdom: Plantae
- Clade: Tracheophytes
- Clade: Angiosperms
- Clade: Monocots
- Order: Asparagales
- Family: Orchidaceae
- Subfamily: Orchidoideae
- Genus: Hemipilia
- Species: H. amplexifolia

Binomial name
- Hemipilia amplexifolia (Tang & F.T.Wang) Y.Tang & H.Peng

Synonyms
- Amitostigma amplexifolium Tang & F.T.Wang; Ponerorchis amplexifolia (Tang & F.T.Wang) X.H.Jin, Schuit. & W.T.Jin

= Hemipilia amplexifolia =

Species of flowering plant

Hemipilia amplexifolia is a species of flowering plant in the family Orchidaceae, native to south-central China (western Sichuan).

== Taxonomy ==
The species was first described in 1936 by Tsin Tang and Fa Tsuan Wang as Amitostigma amplexifolium. A molecular phylogenetic study in 2014 found that species of Amitostigma, Neottianthe and Ponerorchis were mixed together in a single clade, making none of the three genera monophyletic as then circumscribed. Amitostigma and Neottianthe were subsumed into Ponerorchis, with this species then becoming Ponerorchis amplexifolia. The genus Ponerorchis has now been synonymized with the genus Hemipilia, resulting in the present scientific name.
