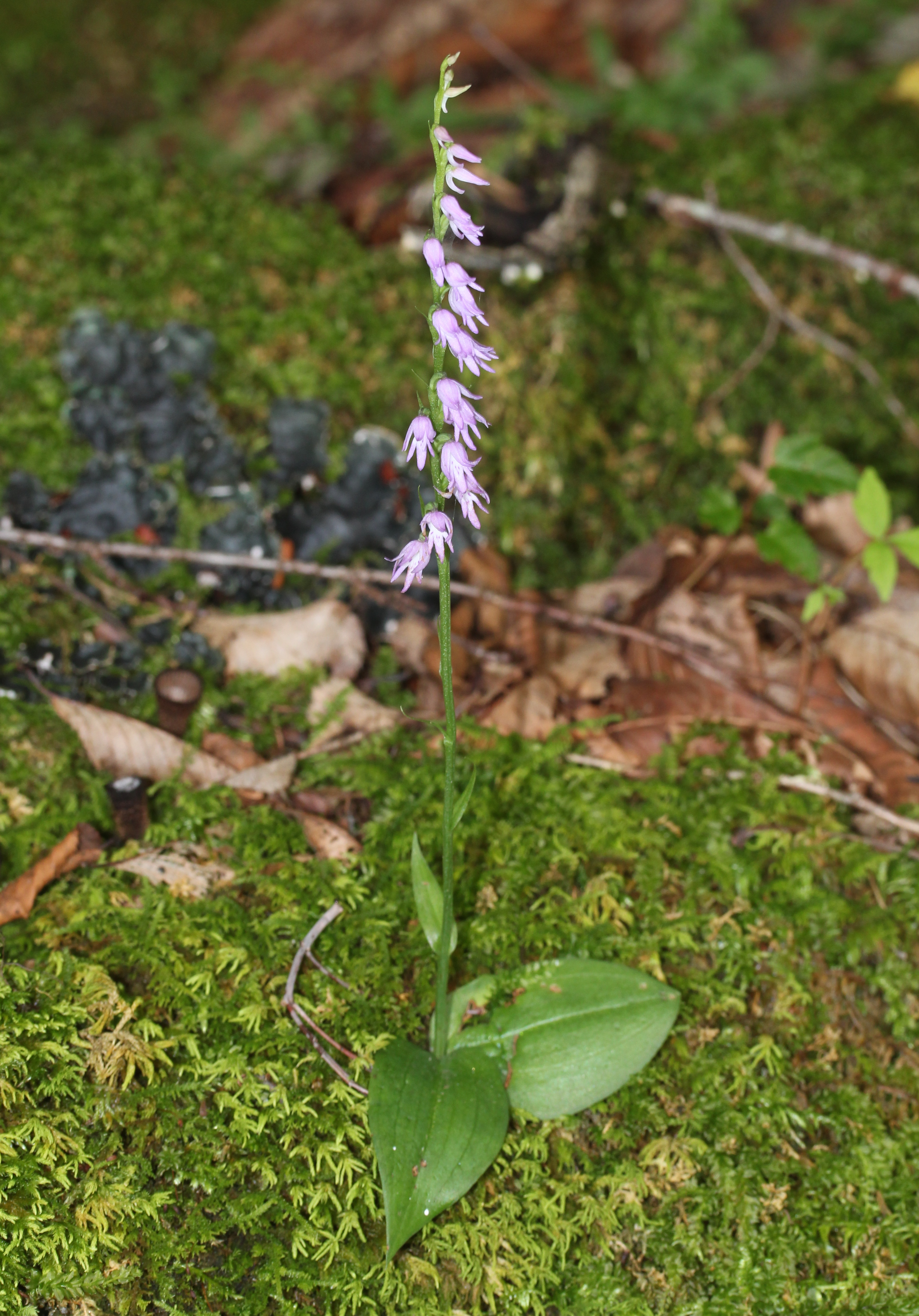

Scientific classification
- Kingdom: Plantae
- Clade: Tracheophytes
- Clade: Angiosperms
- Clade: Monocots
- Order: Asparagales
- Family: Orchidaceae
- Subfamily: Orchidoideae
- Genus: Hemipilia
- Species: H. cucullata

Binomial name
- Hemipilia cucullata (L.) Y.Tang, H.Peng & T.Yukawa

Synonyms
- List: Gymnadenia cucullata (L.) Rich.; Habenaria cucullata (L.) Höfft. ex Ledeb.; Himantoglossum cucullatum (L.) Rchb.; Neottianthe cucullata (L.) Schltr.; Orchis cucullata L.; Ponerorchis cucullata (L.) X.H.Jin, Schuit. & W.T.Jin; Coeloglossum alpinum Schur; Coeloglossum purpureum Schur; Gymnadenia cucullata var. maculata Nakai & Kitag.; Gymnadenia cucullata subsp. purpurea (Schur) E.G.Camus; Gymnadenia cucullata var. variegata Y.N.Lee; Gymnadenia monophylla Ames & Schltr.; Gymnadenia pseudodiphylax Kraenzl.; Gymnadenia scabrilinguis Kraenzl.; Neottianthe angustifolia K.Y.Lang; Neottianthe cucullata f. albiflora P.Y.Fu, S.Z.Liu; Neottianthe cucullata f. maculata Nakai & Kitag.; Neottianthe cucullata f. variegata (Y.N.Lee) M.Kim; Neottianthe maculata (Nakai & Kitag.) Nakai & Kitag.; Neottianthe monophylla (Ames & Schltr.) Schltr.; Neottianthe pseudodiphylax (Kraenzl.) Schltr.; Neottianthe pseudodiphylax var. monophylla (Ames & Schltr.) Soó; Peristylus purpureus Schur

= Hemipilia cucullata =

Species of plant

Hemipilia cucullata is a species of flowering plant in the family Orchidaceae, native to temperate Eurasia from Poland to Japan, and also to the Himalayas. It is terrestrial, growing from tubers, to a height of up to 30 cm, with pinkish flowers arranged in a one-sided spike. It was placed in several different genera before being placed in its present genus.

== Description ==
Hemipilia cucullata grows from more or less ellipsoid tubers. It reaches a height of around 10–30 cm. It has two basal leaves, 5–7 cm long by 1.5–3 cm wide. One or two smaller bract-like leaves occur further up the stem. The pinkish flowers are arranged in a one-sided spike. The lip or labellum is 7–9 mm long and is deeply divided into three lobes, the middle lobe being the longest. The sepals and lateral petals are about 1 mm shorter than the labellum, and together form a "hood". A spur is present, about 6 mm long, slightly expanded at the tip. The viscidia are not enclosed in a "sac" or bursicle.

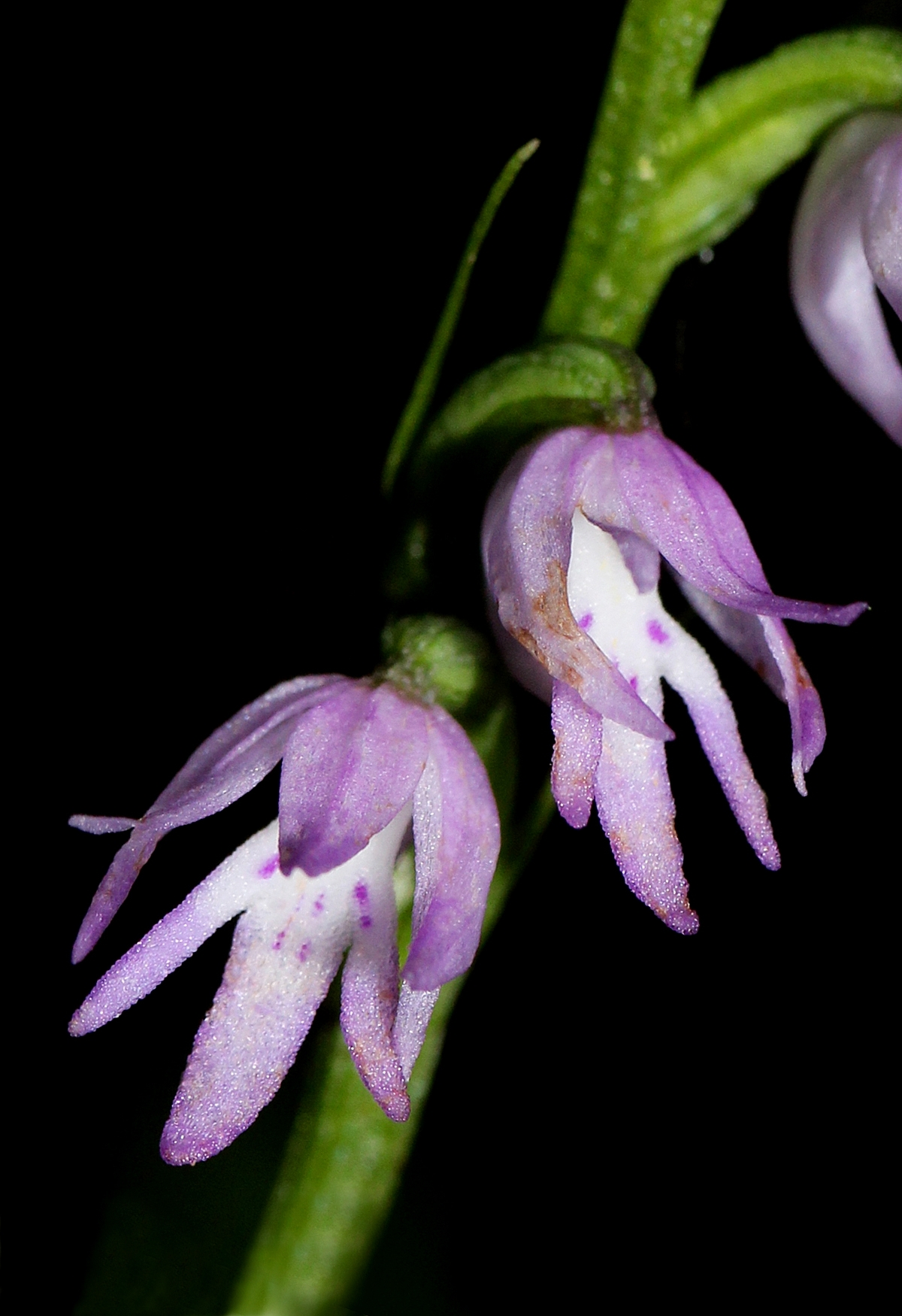
Flowers

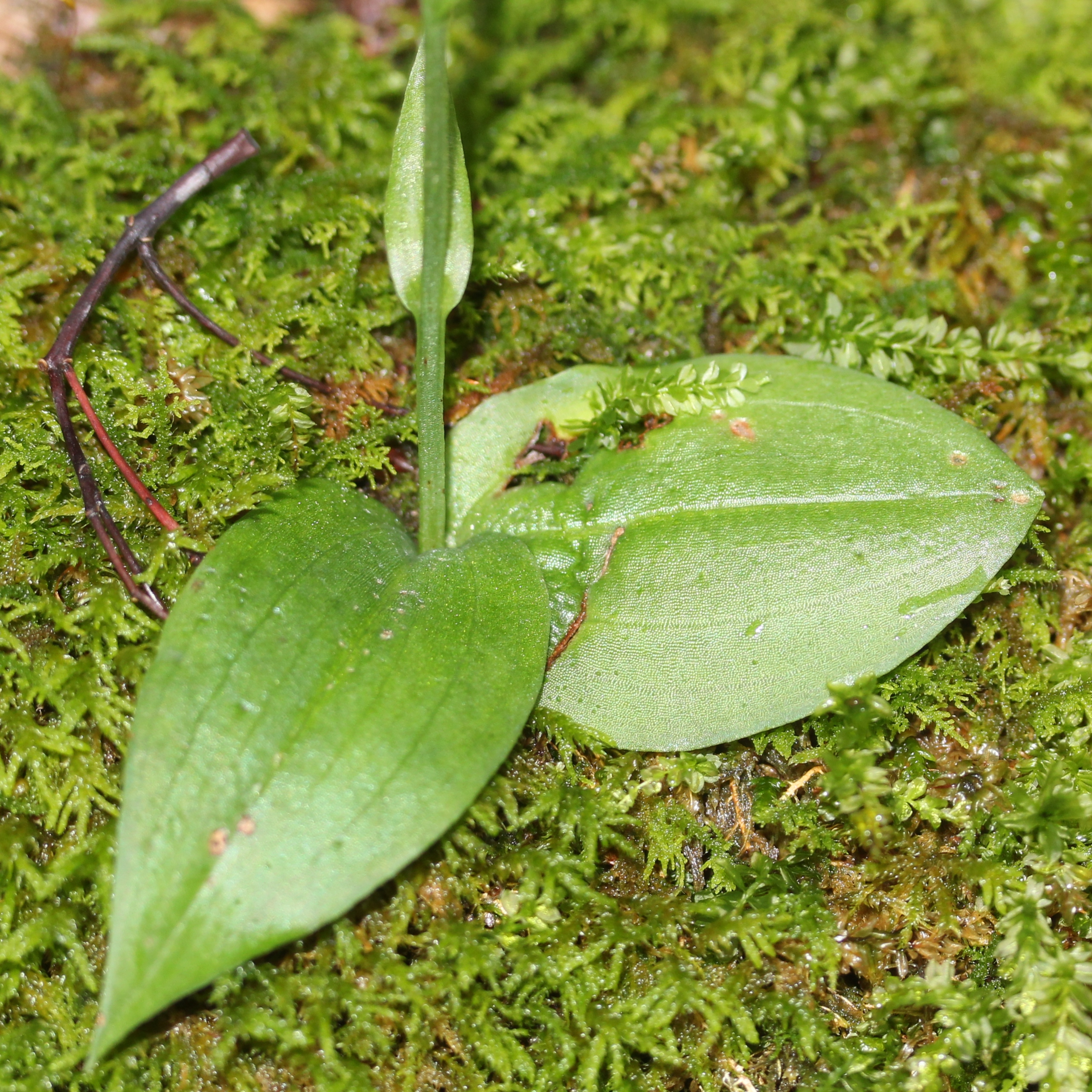
Basal leaves

== Taxonomy ==
The species was first described by Carl Linnaeus in 1753 as Orchis cucullata. It was subsequently transferred to a number of genera, including Gymnadenia and Habenaria, before being placed in Neottianthe in 1919. A molecular phylogenetic study in 2014 found that species of Neottianthe, Amitostigma and Ponerorchis were mixed together in a single clade, making none of the three genera monophyletic as then circumscribed. Neottianthe and Amitostigma were subsumed into Ponerorchis, with this species then becoming Ponerorchis cucullata. The genus Ponerorchis has since been synonymized with the genus Hemipilia, resulting in the present name.

== Distribution ==
Hemipilia cucullata has a very wide distribution in temperate regions of Eurasia. In Europe, it is native to Poland and Eastern Europe. In Asia, it is found in Siberia, the Russian Far East, Mongolia, China, Japan and Korea. It is also found in the Himalayas including Nepal.
