= Hemipilia farreri =

Scientific classification
- Kingdom: Plantae
- Clade: Tracheophytes
- Clade: Angiosperms
- Clade: Monocots
- Order: Asparagales
- Family: Orchidaceae
- Subfamily: Orchidoideae
- Genus: Hemipilia
- Species: H. farreri

Binomial name
- Hemipilia farreri (Schltr.) Y.Tang & H.Peng

Synonyms
- Amitostigma farreri Schltr.; Orchis farreri (Schltr.) Soó; Ponerorchis farreri (Schltr.) X.H.Jin, Schuit. & W.T.Jin

Species of flowering plant

Hemipilia farreri is a species of flowering plant in the family Orchidaceae. It is endemic to China, where it is found from south-eastern Tibet to north-western Yunnan.

== Taxonomy ==
The species was first described in 1924 by Rudolf Schlechter, as Amitostigma farreri. A molecular phylogenetic study in 2014 found that species of Amitostigma, Neottianthe and Ponerorchis were mixed together in a single clade, making none of the three genera monophyletic as then circumscribed. Amitostigma and Neottianthe were subsumed into Ponerorchis, with Amitostigma farreri then becoming Ponerorchis farreri. The genus Ponerorchis has since been synonymized with the genus Hemipilia, resulting in the present name.
