= Hemipilia simplex =

Conservation status
- Endangered (IUCN 3.1)

Scientific classification
- Kingdom: Plantae
- Clade: Tracheophytes
- Clade: Angiosperms
- Clade: Monocots
- Order: Asparagales
- Family: Orchidaceae
- Subfamily: Orchidoideae
- Genus: Hemipilia
- Species: H. simplex

Binomial name
- Hemipilia simplex (Tang & F.T.Wang) Y.Tang & H.Peng

Synonyms
- Amitostigma simplex Tang & F.T.Wang; Ponerorchis simplex (Tang & F.T.Wang) X.H.Jin, Schuit. & W.T.Jin

Species of orchid

Hemipilia simplex is a species of plant in the family Orchidaceae. It is endemic to China, where it is found in Sichuan and Yunnan. Its flowers are yellow, sometimes with brown spots.

== Taxonomy ==
The species was first described in 1940 by Tsin Tang and Fa Tsuan Wang, as Amitostigma simplex. A molecular phylogenetic study in 2014 found that species of Amitostigma, Neottianthe and Ponerorchis were mixed together in a single clade, making none of the three genera monophyletic as then circumscribed. Amitostigma and Neottianthe were subsumed into Ponerorchis, with this species then becoming Ponerorchis simplex. The genus Ponerorchis has since been synonymized with the genus Hemipilia, resulting in the present name.
