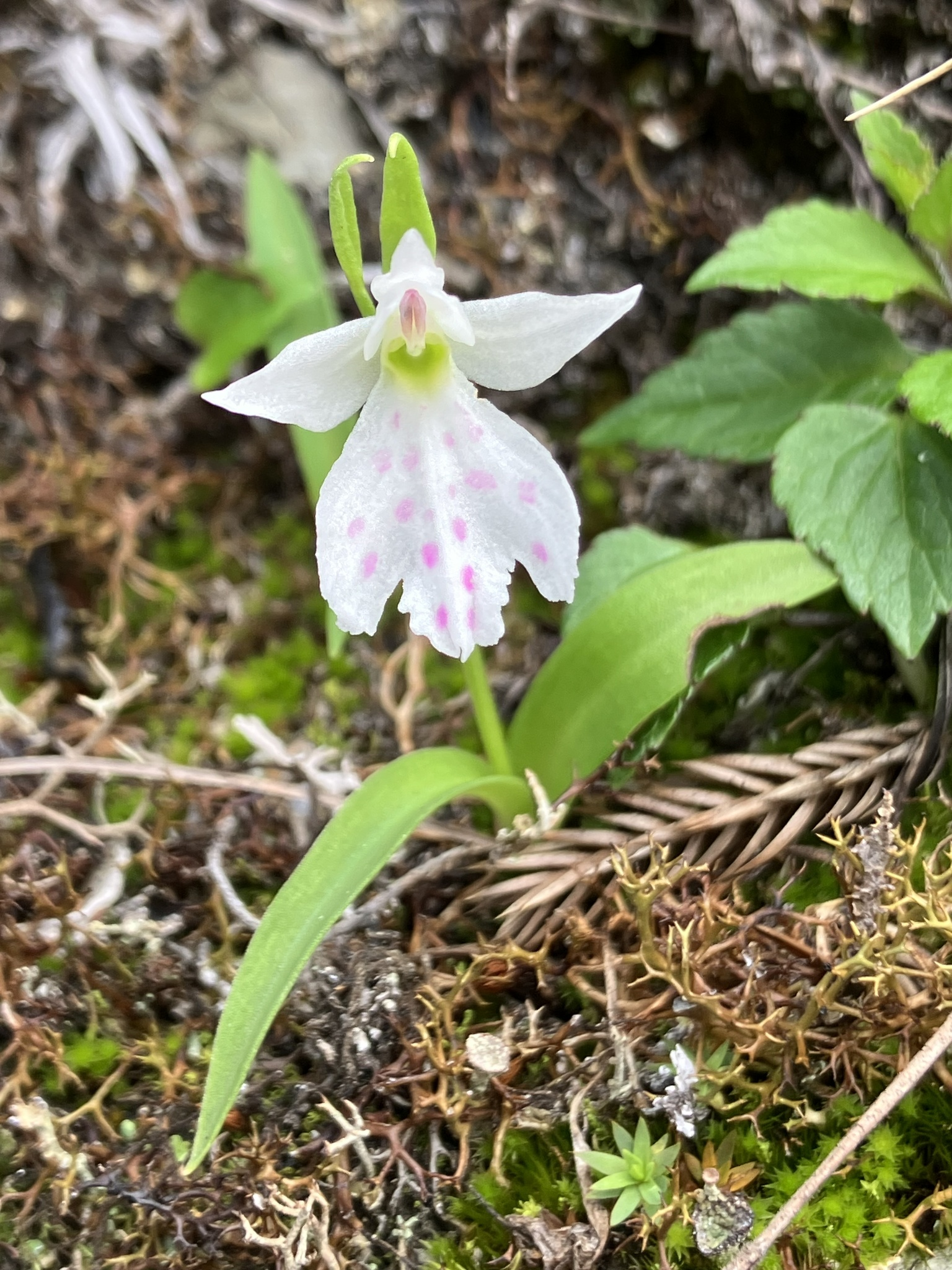

Scientific classification
- Kingdom: Plantae
- Clade: Tracheophytes
- Clade: Angiosperms
- Clade: Monocots
- Order: Asparagales
- Family: Orchidaceae
- Subfamily: Orchidoideae
- Genus: Hemipilia
- Species: H. tominagae

Binomial name
- Hemipilia tominagae (Hayata) Y.Tang & H.Peng

Synonyms
- List: Amitostigma tominagae (Hayata) Schltr.; Gymnadenia tominagae Hayata; Orchis tominagae (Hayata) Soó; Ponerorchis tominagae (Hayata) H.J.Su & Jr J.Chen; Chusua kunikikoana (Masam. & Fukuy.) P.F.Hunt; Orchis kiraishiensis f. leucantha Masam.; Orchis kiraishiensis var. leucantha (Masam.) Masam.; Orchis kuanshanensis S.S.Ying; Orchis kunihikoana Masam. & Fukuy.; Orchis taoloii S.S.Ying; Ponerorchis kiraishiensis var. leucantha (Masam.) A.T.Hsieh; Ponerorchis kunikikoana (Masam. & Fukuy.) Soó

= Hemipilia tominagae =

Species of flowering plant

Hemipilia tominagae is a species of flowering plant in the orchid family Orchidaceae, native to Taiwan.

== Taxonomy ==
The species was first described by Bunzō Hayata in 1916 as Gymnadenia tominagae. Hayata stated that the plant he described was collected by T. Tominaga. He spelt the specific epithet as "tominagai", and this spelling has been used by some subsequent authors when transferring the species to a different genus. However, the International Code of Nomenclature for algae, fungi, and plants requires names not published in a form specified by the code to be corrected to conform to it, and personal names ending in "-a", even if the person is a man, should have an epithet in the genitive case formed by adding "-e". The epithet is thus correctly spelt "tominagae".

The species has been transferred to several genera: to Amitostigma, to Orchis, Ponerorchis, and now to Hemipilia. Several other species have been brought into synonymy with Hemipilia tominagae.
