= Hemipilia bidupensis =

Scientific classification
- Kingdom: Plantae
- Clade: Tracheophytes
- Clade: Angiosperms
- Clade: Monocots
- Order: Asparagales
- Family: Orchidaceae
- Subfamily: Orchidoideae
- Genus: Hemipilia
- Species: H. bidupensis

Binomial name
- Hemipilia bidupensis Aver.

Synonyms
- Amitostigma bidupense (Aver.) Aver.; Ponerorchis bidupensis (Aver.) X.H.Jin, Schuit. & W.T.Jin

Species of flowering plant

Hemipilia bidupensis is a species of flowering plant in the family Orchidaceae, native to southern Vietnam.

== Taxonomy ==
The species was first described in 1999 by Leonid Averyanov, as Hemipilia bidupensis. In 2010, he transferred it to Amitostigma. A molecular phylogenetic study in 2014 found that species of Neottianthe, Amitostigma and Ponerorchis were mixed together in a single clade, making none of the three genera monophyletic as then circumscribed. Neottianthe and Amitostigma were subsumed into Ponerorchis, with this species then becoming Ponerorchis bidupensis. The genus Ponerorchis has since been synonymized with the genus Hemipilia, restoring the original name.
