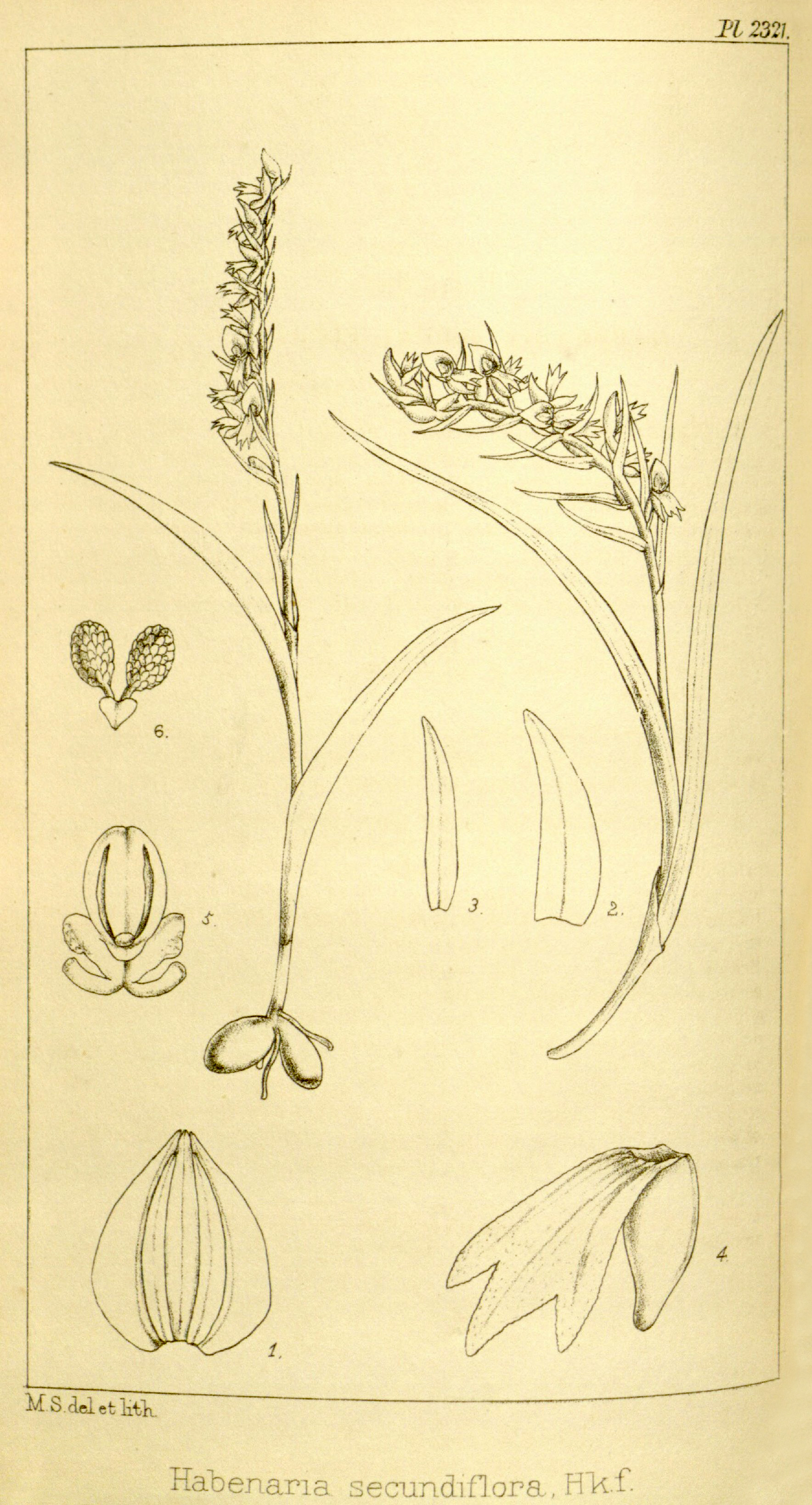

Conservation status
- Endangered (IUCN 3.1)

Scientific classification
- Kingdom: Plantae
- Clade: Tracheophytes
- Clade: Angiosperms
- Clade: Monocots
- Order: Asparagales
- Family: Orchidaceae
- Subfamily: Orchidoideae
- Genus: Hemipilia
- Species: H. secundiflora

Binomial name
- Hemipilia secundiflora (Kraenzl.) Y.Tang & H.Peng

Synonyms
- Gymnadenia secundiflora (Kraenzl.) Kraenzl.; Habenaria secundiflora Hook.f.; Neottianthe secundiflora (Kraenzl.) Schltr.; Neottianthe mairei Schltr.; Peristylus secundiflorus Kraenzl.; Ponerorchis secundiflora (Kraenzl.) X.H.Jin, Schuit. & W.T.Jin

= Hemipilia secundiflora =

Species of orchid

Hemipilia secundiflora is a species of plant in the family Orchidaceae. It is native from the Himalayas to China.

== Taxonomy ==
The species was described by Joseph Dalton Hooker in 1890, under the name "Habenaria secundiflora". However, this name had already been used for a different species in 1881, so was illegitimate. The species was first legitimately named in 1898 by Friedrich Kraenzlin as Peristylus secundiflorus. It was later transferred to Gymnadenia and then to Neottianthe. A molecular phylogenetic study in 2014 found that species of Neottianthe, Amitostigma and Ponerorchis were mixed together in a single clade, making none of the three genera monophyletic as then circumscribed. Neottianthe and Amitostigma were subsumed into Ponerorchis, with this species then becoming Ponerorchis secundiflora. The genus Ponerorchis has since been synonymized with the genus Hemipilia, resulting in the present name.

== Distribution ==
Hemipilia secundiflora is native to the Himalayas, including Tibet, Nepal and the Assam region. Its range extends to Myanmar and south-central China (western Sichuan and north-western Yunnan).
