= Hemipilia wenshanensis =

Scientific classification
- Kingdom: Plantae
- Clade: Tracheophytes
- Clade: Angiosperms
- Clade: Monocots
- Order: Asparagales
- Family: Orchidaceae
- Subfamily: Orchidoideae
- Genus: Hemipilia
- Species: H. wenshanensis

Binomial name
- Hemipilia wenshanensis (W.H.Chen, Y.M.Shui & K.Y.Lang) Y.Tang & H.Peng

Synonyms
- Amitostigma wenshanense W.H.Chen, Y.M.Shui & K.Y.Lang; Ponerorchis wenshanensis (W.H.Chen, Y.M.Shui & K.Y.Lang) X.H.Jin, Schuit. & W.T.Jin

Species of flowering plant

Hemipilia wenshanensis is a species of flowering plant in the family Orchidaceae. It is endemic to south-central China (Yunnan).

== Taxonomy ==
The species was first described in 2003 as Amitostigma wenshanense. A molecular phylogenetic study in 2014 found that species of Amitostigma, Neottianthe and Ponerorchis were mixed together in a single clade, making none of the three genera monophyletic as then circumscribed. Amitostigma and Neottianthe were subsumed into Ponerorchis, with this species then becoming Ponerorchis wenshanensis. The genus Ponerorchis has since been synonymized with the genus Hemipilia, resulting in the present name.
