= Hemipilia tetraloba =

Conservation status
- Endangered (IUCN 3.1)

Scientific classification
- Kingdom: Plantae
- Clade: Tracheophytes
- Clade: Angiosperms
- Clade: Monocots
- Order: Asparagales
- Family: Orchidaceae
- Subfamily: Orchidoideae
- Genus: Hemipilia
- Species: H. tetraloba

Binomial name
- Hemipilia tetraloba (Finet) Y.Tang & H.Peng

Synonyms
- Amitostigma tetralobum (Finet) Schltr.; Orchis tetraloba (Finet) Schltr.; Peristylus tetralobus Finet; Peristylus tetralobus f. typicus Finet; Ponerorchis tetraloba (Finet) X.H.Jin, Schuit. & W.T.Jin; Amitostigma yunnanense Schltr.; Orchis tetraloba var. parciflora Soó; Orchis tetraloba var. yunnanensis Soó

Species of orchid

Hemipilia tetraloba is a species of plant in the family Orchidaceae. It is endemic to China where it is known from Sichuan and Yunnan. The flowers are pink or pale purple.

== Taxonomy ==
The species was first described in 1912 by Achille Eugène Finet, as Peristylus tetralobus. It has been placed in both Orchis and Amitostigma. A molecular phylogenetic study in 2014, in which this species was included as Amitostigma tetralobum, found that species of Amitostigma, Neottianthe and Ponerorchis were mixed together in a single clade, making none of the three genera monophyletic as then circumscribed. Amitostigma and Neottianthe were subsumed into Ponerorchis, with this species then becoming Ponerorchis tetraloba. The genus Ponerorchis has since been synonymized with the genus Hemipilia, resulting in the present name.
