= Hemipilia flabellata =

Conservation status
- Vulnerable (IUCN 3.1)

Scientific classification
- Kingdom: Plantae
- Clade: Tracheophytes
- Clade: Angiosperms
- Clade: Monocots
- Order: Asparagales
- Family: Orchidaceae
- Subfamily: Orchidoideae
- Genus: Hemipilia
- Species: H. flabellata

Binomial name
- Hemipilia flabellata Bureau & Franch.

Species of flowering plant

Hemipilia flabellata is a species of plant in the family Orchidaceae. It is endemic to China.
