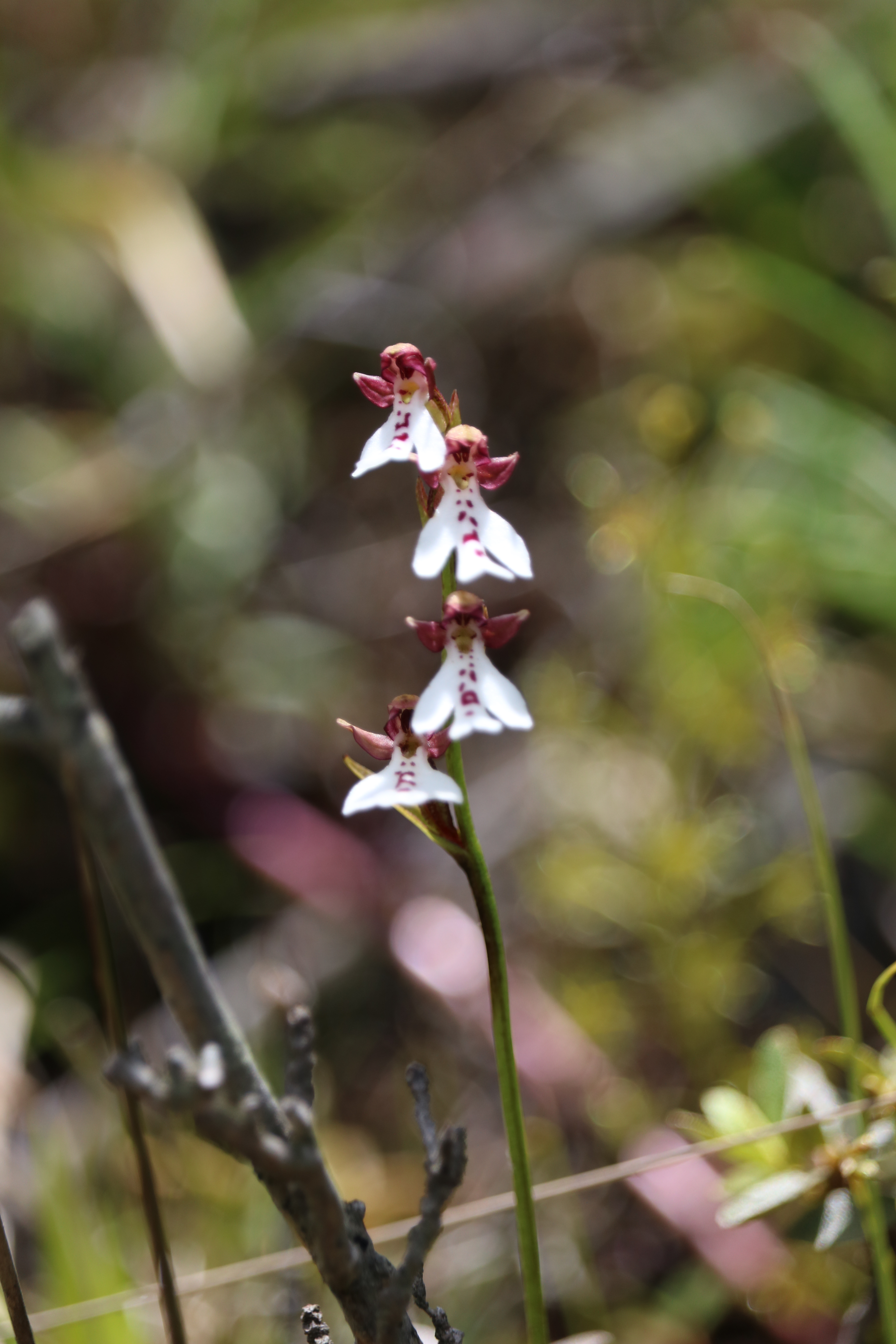
- In Bhutan

Scientific classification
- Kingdom: Plantae
- Clade: Tracheophytes
- Clade: Angiosperms
- Clade: Monocots
- Order: Asparagales
- Family: Orchidaceae
- Subfamily: Orchidoideae
- Genus: Hemipilia
- Species: H. puberula

Binomial name
- Hemipilia puberula (King & Pantl.) Y.Tang & H.Peng

Synonyms
- Amitostigma puberulum (King & Pantl.) Tang & F.T.Wang; Chusua puberula (King & Pantl.) N.Pearce & P.J.Cribb; Orchis puberula King & Pantl.; Ponerorchis puberula (King & Pantl.) Verm.

= Hemipilia puberula =

Species of orchid

Hemipilia puberula is a species of orchid in the family Orchidaceae. It is native to the eastern Himalayas.
