= Tsaiorchis =

Scientific classification
- Kingdom: Plantae
- Clade: Tracheophytes
- Clade: Angiosperms
- Clade: Monocots
- Order: Asparagales
- Family: Orchidaceae
- Subfamily: Orchidoideae
- Subtribe: Orchidinae
- Genus: Tsaiorchis; T.Tang & F.T.Wang

Species
- See text.

Genus of flowering plants

Tsaiorchis is a genus of flowering plants in the family Orchidaceae.

== Taxonomy ==
Tsaiorchis is placed in the orchid subfamily Orchidoideae, tribe Orchideae, subtribe Orchidineae. The relationship between Tsaiorchis and the rest of the subtribe is as shown in the cladogram below.

- Orchidinae
  - - Sirindhornia
    - - Ponerorchis
      - - Hemipilia
        - Tsaiorchis
  - all other genera

Although Tsaiorchis was shown to be sister to an expanded genus Hemipilia, the two have significant differences. Hemipilia grows from tubers, Tsaiorchis has horizontally extending rhizomes. The detailed structure of the flowers is also different.

=== Species ===
Tsaiorchis contains the following species:

- Tsaiorchis neottianthoides T.Tang & F.T.Wang
- Tsaiorchis keiskeoides (Gagnep.) X.H.Jin, Schuit. & W.T.Jin
