= Hemipilia trifurcata =

Scientific classification
- Kingdom: Plantae
- Clade: Tracheophytes
- Clade: Angiosperms
- Clade: Monocots
- Order: Asparagales
- Family: Orchidaceae
- Subfamily: Orchidoideae
- Genus: Hemipilia
- Species: H. trifurcata

Binomial name
- Hemipilia trifurcata (Tang, F.T.Wang & K.Y.Lang) Y.Tang & H.Peng

Synonyms
- Amitostigma trifurcatum Tang, F.T.Wang & K.Y.Lang; Ponerorchis trifurcata (Tang, F.T.Wang & K.Y.Lang) X.H.Jin, Schuit. & W.T.Jin

Species of flowering plant

Hemipilia trifurcata is a species of flowering plant in the orchid family Orchidaceae. It is endemic to south-central China (north-western Yunnan).

== Taxonomy ==
The species was first described in 1982 as Amitostigma trifurcatum. A molecular phylogenetic study in 2014 found that species of Amitostigma, Neottianthe and Ponerorchis were mixed together in a single clade, making none of the three genera monophyletic as then circumscribed. Amitostigma and Neottianthe were subsumed into Ponerorchis, with this species then becoming Ponerorchis trifurcata. The genus Ponerorchis has since been synonymized with the genus Hemipilia, resulting in the present name.
