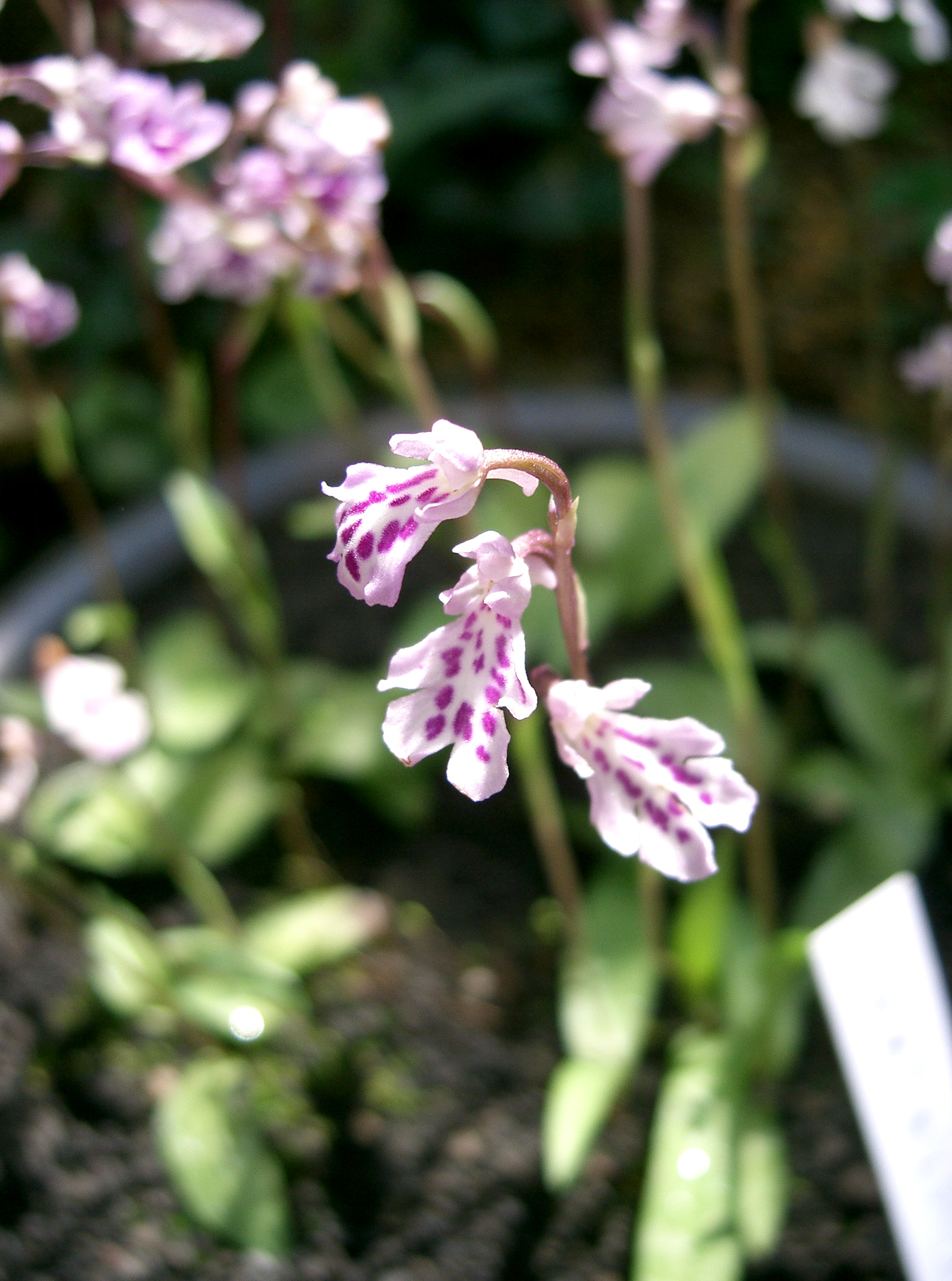

Scientific classification
- Kingdom: Plantae
- Clade: Tracheophytes
- Clade: Angiosperms
- Clade: Monocots
- Order: Asparagales
- Family: Orchidaceae
- Subfamily: Orchidoideae
- Genus: Hemipilia
- Species: H. lepida

Binomial name
- Hemipilia lepida (Rchb.f.) Y.Tang, H.Peng & T.Yukawa

Synonyms
- Amitostigma lepidum (Rchb.f.) Schltr.; Gymnadenia lepida Rchb.f. (1878); Orchis lepida (Rchb.f.) Soó (1929); Ponerorchis lepida (Rchb.f.) X.H.Jin, Schuit. & W.T.Jin; Galearis ferrieana (Kraenzl.) P.F.Hunt; Orchis ferrieana Kraenzl.

= Hemipilia lepida =

Species of orchid

Hemipilia lepida is a species of plant in the family Orchidaceae found on Kyushu Island in Japan, and in the Ryukyu Islands to the south.

== Taxonomy ==
The species was first described by Heinrich Gustav Reichenbach in 1878, as Gymnadenia lepida. It has been placed in various genera, including Gymnadenia, Orchis and Amitostigma. A molecular phylogenetic study in 2014, in which it was included as Amitostigma lepidum, found that species of Amitostigma, Neottianthe and Ponerorchis were mixed together in a single clade, making none of the three genera monophyletic as then circumscribed. Amitostigma and Neottianthe were subsumed into Ponerorchis, with this species then becoming Ponerorchis lepida. The genus Ponerorchis has since been synonymized with the genus Hemipilia, resulting in the present name.
