= Hemipilia cordifolia =

Conservation status
- Endangered (IUCN 3.1)

Scientific classification
- Kingdom: Plantae
- Clade: Tracheophytes
- Clade: Angiosperms
- Clade: Monocots
- Order: Asparagales
- Family: Orchidaceae
- Subfamily: Orchidoideae
- Genus: Hemipilia
- Species: H. cordifolia

Binomial name
- Hemipilia cordifolia Lindl.

Synonyms
- List: Hemipilia bulleyi Rolfe; Hemipilia cordifolia var. yunnanensis Finet; Hemipilia cruciata Finet; Hemipilia cruciata var. yunnanensis (Finet) Soó; Hemipilia formosana Hayata; Hemipilia yunnanensis (Finet) Schltr.; Platanthera cordifolia Lindl. ex Wall.

Species of flowering plant

Hemipilia cordifolia is a species of flowering plant in the family Orchidaceae. It is tuberous geophyte native to the Himalayas, south-central China, Myanmar, and Taiwan.
