= Hemipilia tibetica =

Scientific classification
- Kingdom: Plantae
- Clade: Tracheophytes
- Clade: Angiosperms
- Clade: Monocots
- Order: Asparagales
- Family: Orchidaceae
- Subfamily: Orchidoideae
- Genus: Hemipilia
- Species: H. tibetica

Binomial name
- Hemipilia tibetica (Schltr.) Y.Tang & H.Peng

Synonyms
- Amitostigma tibeticum Schltr.; Orchis tibetica (Schltr.) Soó; Ponerorchis tibetica (Schltr.) X.H.Jin, Schuit. & W.T.Jin

Species of flowering plant

Hemipilia tibetica is a species of flowering plant in the orchid family Orchidaceae, which is endemic to China. It is found from south-eastern Tibet to south-central China (north-western Yunnan).

== Taxonomy ==
The species was first described in 1924 by Rudolf Schlechter, as Amitostigma tibeticum. A molecular phylogenetic study in 2014 found that species of Amitostigma, Neottianthe and Ponerorchis were mixed together in a single clade, making none of the three genera monophyletic as then circumscribed. Amitostigma and Neottianthe were subsumed into Ponerorchis, with this species then becoming Ponerorchis tibetica. The genus Ponerorchis has since been synonymized with the genus Hemipilia, resulting in the present name.
