= Hemipilia ovata =

Scientific classification
- Kingdom: Plantae
- Clade: Tracheophytes
- Clade: Angiosperms
- Clade: Monocots
- Order: Asparagales
- Family: Orchidaceae
- Subfamily: Orchidoideae
- Genus: Hemipilia
- Species: H. ovata

Binomial name
- Hemipilia ovata (K.Y.Lang) Y.Tang & H.Peng

Synonyms
- Neottianthe ovata K.Y.Lang; Ponerorchis ovata (K.Y.Lang) X.H.Jin, Schuit. & W.T.Jin

Species of flowering plant

Hemipilia ovata is a species of flowering plant in the family Orchidaceae, native to south-central China (western Sichuan).

== Taxonomy ==
The species was first described in 1997 by Kai Yung Lang, as Neottianthe ovata. A molecular phylogenetic study in 2014 found that species of Neottianthe, Amitostigma and Ponerorchis were mixed together in a single clade, making none of the three genera monophyletic as then circumscribed. Neottianthe and Amitostigma were subsumed into Ponerorchis, with this species then becoming Ponerorchis ovata. The genus Ponerorchis has since been synonymized with the genus Hemipilia, resulting in the present name.
