= Hemipilia parceflora =

Scientific classification
- Kingdom: Plantae
- Clade: Tracheophytes
- Clade: Angiosperms
- Clade: Monocots
- Order: Asparagales
- Family: Orchidaceae
- Subfamily: Orchidoideae
- Genus: Hemipilia
- Species: H. parceflora

Binomial name
- Hemipilia parceflora (Finet) Y.Tang & H.Peng

Synonyms
- Amitostigma parceflorum (Finet) Schltr.; Orchis parceflora (Finet) Hand.-Mazz.; Peristylus tetralobus f. parceflorus Finet; Ponerorchis parceflora (Finet) X.H.Jin, Schuit. & W.T.Jin

Species of flowering plant

Hemipilia parceflora is a species of flowering plant in the family Orchidaceae, native to south-central China (north-eastern Sichuan, Chongqing). The epithet has been mis-spelt "parciflora" by some authors.

== Taxonomy ==
The species was first described in 1902 by Achille Eugène Finet, as Peristylus tetralobus f. parceflorus. It was later raised to a full species and transferred to the genus Amitostigma as Amitostigma parceflorum. A molecular phylogenetic study in 2014 found that species of Amitostigma, Neottianthe and Ponerorchis were mixed together in a single clade, making none of the three genera monophyletic as then circumscribed. Amitostigma and Neottianthe were subsumed into Ponerorchis, with this species then becoming Ponerorchis parceflora. The genus Ponerorchis has since been synonymized with the genus Hemipilia, resulting in the present name.
