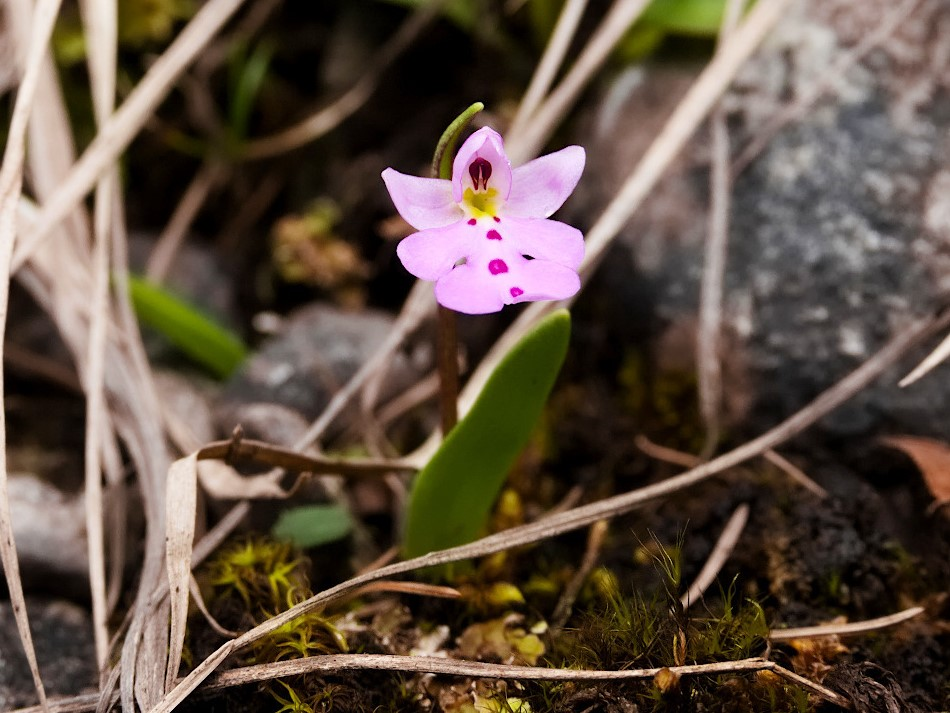

Scientific classification
- Kingdom: Plantae
- Clade: Tracheophytes
- Clade: Angiosperms
- Clade: Monocots
- Order: Asparagales
- Family: Orchidaceae
- Subfamily: Orchidoideae
- Genus: Hemipilia
- Species: H. monantha

Binomial name
- Hemipilia monantha (Finet) Y.Tang & H.Peng

Synonyms
- Amitostigma monanthum (Finet) Schltr.; Orchis monantha (Finet) Soó; Peristylus monanthus Finet; Ponerorchis monantha (Finet) X.H.Jin, Schuit. & W.T.Jin; Amitostigma forrestii Schltr.; Amitostigma monanthum var. forrestii (Schltr.) Tang & F.T.Wang; Amitostigma nivale Schltr.; Orchis forrestii (Schltr.) Soó; Orchis nivalis (Schltr.) Soó

= Hemipilia monantha =

Species of orchid

Hemipilia monantha is a species of plant in the family Orchidaceae native to China from south-eastern Tibet to south-central and north-central China.

== Taxonomy ==
The species was first described by Achille Eugène Finet in 1902, as Peristylus monanthus. It was later transferred to Orchis and to Amitostigma. A molecular phylogenetic study in 2014, in which it was included as Amitostigma monanthum, found that species of Amitostigma, Neottianthe and Ponerorchis were mixed together in a single clade, making none of the three genera monophyletic as then circumscribed. Amitostigma and Neottianthe were subsumed into Ponerorchis, with this species then becoming Ponerorchis monantha. The genus Ponerorchis has since been synonymized with the genus Hemipilia, resulting in the present name.
