= Hemipilia basifoliata =

Scientific classification
- Kingdom: Plantae
- Clade: Tracheophytes
- Clade: Angiosperms
- Clade: Monocots
- Order: Asparagales
- Family: Orchidaceae
- Subfamily: Orchidoideae
- Genus: Hemipilia
- Species: H. basifoliata

Binomial name
- Hemipilia basifoliata (Finet) Y.Tang & H.Peng

Synonyms
- Peristylus tetralobus f. basifoliatus Fine; Orchis basifoliata (Finet) Schltr.; Amitostigma basifoliatum (Finet) Schltr.; Ponerorchis basifoliata (Finet) X.H.Jin, Schuit. & W.T.Jin

Species of flowering plant

Hemipilia basifoliata is a species of flowering plant in the family Orchidaceae, native to south-eastern China (south-eastern Sichuan, northern Yunnan).

== Taxonomy ==
The species was first described in 1902 by Achille Eugène Finet, as Peristylus tetralobus f. basifoliatus. It was later raised to a species and transferred successively to the genus Orchis and then to the genus Amitostigma. A molecular phylogenetic study in 2014 found that species of Amitostigma, Neottianthe and Ponerorchis were mixed together in a single clade, making none of the three genera monophyletic as then circumscribed. Amitostigma and Neottianthe were subsumed into Ponerorchis, with Amitostigma basifoliatum then becoming Ponerorchis basifoliata. The genus Ponerorchis has since been synonymized with the genus Hemipilia, resulting in the present name.
