= Hemipilia capitata =

Conservation status
- Endangered (IUCN 3.1)

Scientific classification
- Kingdom: Plantae
- Clade: Tracheophytes
- Clade: Angiosperms
- Clade: Monocots
- Order: Asparagales
- Family: Orchidaceae
- Subfamily: Orchidoideae
- Genus: Hemipilia
- Species: H. capitata

Binomial name
- Hemipilia capitata (Tang & F.T.Wang) Y.Tang & H.Peng

Synonyms
- Amitostigma capitatum Tang & F.T.Wang; Ponerorchis capitata (Tang & F.T.Wang) X.H.Jin, Schuit. & W.T.Jin

Species of orchid

Hemipilia capitata is a species of plant in the family Orchidaceae. It is endemic to China, where it is known from Sichuan and Hubei. It produces white flowers.

== Taxonomy ==
The species was first described in 1936 by Tsin Tang and Fa Tsuan Wang, as Amitostigma capitatum. A molecular phylogenetic study in 2014 found that species of Amitostigma, Neottianthe and Ponerorchis were mixed together in a single clade, making none of the three genera monophyletic as then circumscribed. Amitostigma and Neottianthe were subsumed into Ponerorchis, with this species then becoming Ponerorchis capitata. The genus Ponerorchis has since been synonymized with the genus Hemipilia, resulting in the present name.
