= Hemipilia hemipilioides =

Conservation status
- Endangered (IUCN 3.1)

Scientific classification
- Kingdom: Plantae
- Clade: Tracheophytes
- Clade: Angiosperms
- Clade: Monocots
- Order: Asparagales
- Family: Orchidaceae
- Subfamily: Orchidoideae
- Genus: Hemipilia
- Species: H. hemipilioides

Binomial name
- Hemipilia hemipilioides (Finet) Y.Tang & H.Peng

Synonyms
- Amitostigma hemipilioides (Finet) Tang & F.T.Wang; Chusua hemipilioides (Finet) P.F.Hunt; Gymnadenia hemipilioides Finet; Ponerorchis hemipilioides (Finet) Tang & F.T.Wang; Amitostigma microhemipilia Schltr.; Hemipilia silvatica Kraenzl.; Orchis microhemipilia (Schltr.) Soó

Species of orchid

Hemipilia hemipilioides is a species of orchid endemic to China, where it is found in Yunnan and Guizhou. It produces pinkish flowers with purplish spots.
