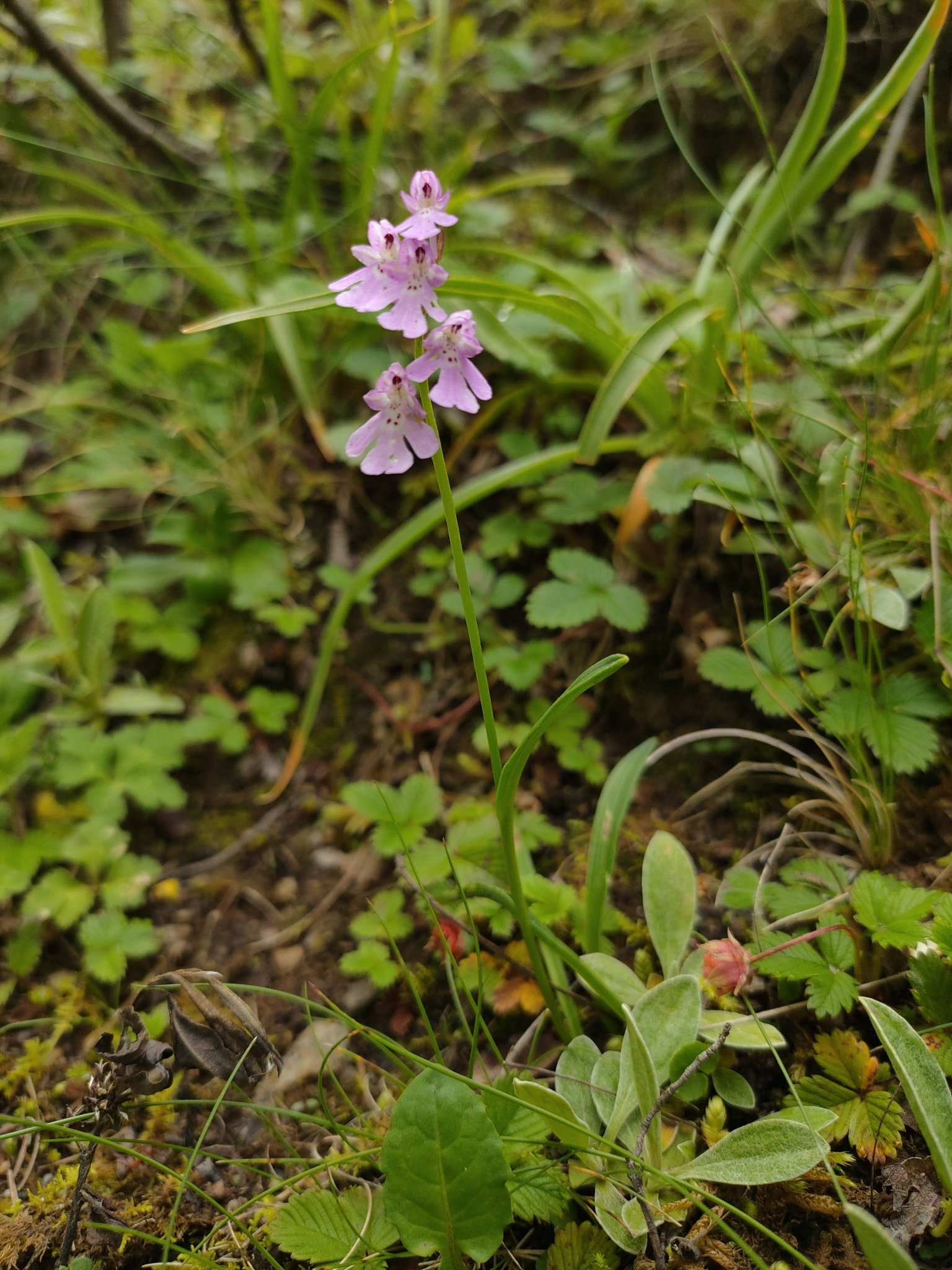

Scientific classification
- Kingdom: Plantae
- Clade: Tracheophytes
- Clade: Angiosperms
- Clade: Monocots
- Order: Asparagales
- Family: Orchidaceae
- Subfamily: Orchidoideae
- Genus: Hemipilia
- Species: H. faberi

Binomial name
- Hemipilia faberi (Rolfe) Y.Tang & H.Peng

Synonyms
- Amitostigma faberi (Rolfe) Schltr.; Gymnadenia faberi (Rolfe) Rolfe; Habenaria faberi Rolfe; Orchis faberi (Rolfe) Soó; Ponerorchis faberi (Rolfe) X.H.Jin, Schuit. & W.T.Jin

= Hemipilia faberi =

Species of flowering plant

Hemipilia faberi is a species of flowering plant in the family Orchidaceae, native to south-central China (Sichuan, north-western Yunnan, north-eastern Guizhou).

== Taxonomy ==
The species was first described by Robert Allen Rolfe in 1982 as Habenaria faberi, although he later transferred it to Gymnadenia. It was later transferred again to Amitostigma. A molecular phylogenetic study in 2014 found that species of Amitostigma, Neottianthe and Ponerorchis were mixed together in a single clade, making none of the three genera monophyletic as then circumscribed. Amitostigma and Neottianthe were subsumed into Ponerorchis, with Amitostigma faberi then becoming Ponerorchis faberi. The genus Ponerorchis has since been synonymized with the genus Hemipilia, resulting in the present name.
