= Hemipilia camptoceras =

Conservation status
- Endangered (IUCN 3.1)

Scientific classification
- Kingdom: Plantae
- Clade: Tracheophytes
- Clade: Angiosperms
- Clade: Monocots
- Order: Asparagales
- Family: Orchidaceae
- Subfamily: Orchidoideae
- Genus: Hemipilia
- Species: H. camptoceras

Binomial name
- Hemipilia camptoceras (Rolfe ex Hemsl.) Y.Tang & H.Peng

Synonyms
- List: Gymnadenia camptoceras (Rolfe ex Hemsl.) Schltr.; Habenaria camptoceras Rolfe ex Hemsl.; Neottianthe camptoceras (Rolfe ex Hemsl.) Schltr.; Ponerorchis camptoceras (Rolfe ex Hemsl.) X.H.Jin, Schuit. & W.T.Jin; Amitostigma potaninii K.V.Ivanova; Amitostigma potaninii f. macranthum K.V.Ivanova; Galearis constricta (L.O.Williams) P.F.Hunt; Galeorchis constricta (L.O.Williams) Soó; Orchis constricta L.O.Williams

Species of orchid

Hemipilia camptoceras is a species of plant in the family Orchidaceae. It is endemic to the Sichuan region of China.

== Taxonomy ==
The species was first described in 1892 as Habenaria camptoceras by William Botting Hemsley, who attributed the name to Robert Allen Rolfe. In 1919, Friedrich Rudolf Schlechter transferred the species to Neottianthe (having slightly earlier placed it in Gymnadenia). A molecular phylogenetic study in 2014 found that species of Neottianthe, Amitostigma and Ponerorchis were mixed together in a single clade, making none of the three genera monophyletic as then circumscribed. Neottianthe and Amitostigma were subsumed into Ponerorchis, with this species then becoming Ponerorchis camptoceras. The genus Ponerorchis has since been synonymized with the genus Hemipilia, resulting in the present name.
