= Hemipilia dolichocentra =

Scientific classification
- Kingdom: Plantae
- Clade: Tracheophytes
- Clade: Angiosperms
- Clade: Monocots
- Order: Asparagales
- Family: Orchidaceae
- Subfamily: Orchidoideae
- Genus: Hemipilia
- Species: H. dolichocentra

Binomial name
- Hemipilia dolichocentra (Tang, F.T.Wang & K.Y.Lang) Y.Tang & H.Peng

Synonyms
- Amitostigma dolichocentrum Tang, F.T.Wang & K.Y.Lang; Ponerorchis dolichocentra (Tang, F.T.Wang & K.Y.Lang) X.H.Jin, Schuit. & W.T.Jin

Species of flowering plant

Hemipilia dolichocentra is a species of flowering plant in the family Orchidaceae, native to south-central China (western Sichuan).

== Taxonomy ==
The species was first described in 1982 as Amitostigma dolichocentrum. A molecular phylogenetic study in 2014 found that species of Amitostigma, Neottianthe and Ponerorchis were mixed together in a single clade, making none of the three genera monophyletic as then circumscribed. Amitostigma and Neottianthe were subsumed into Ponerorchis, with Amitostigma dolichocentrum then becoming Ponerorchis dolichocentra. The genus Ponerorchis has since been synonymized with the genus Hemipilia, resulting in the present name.
