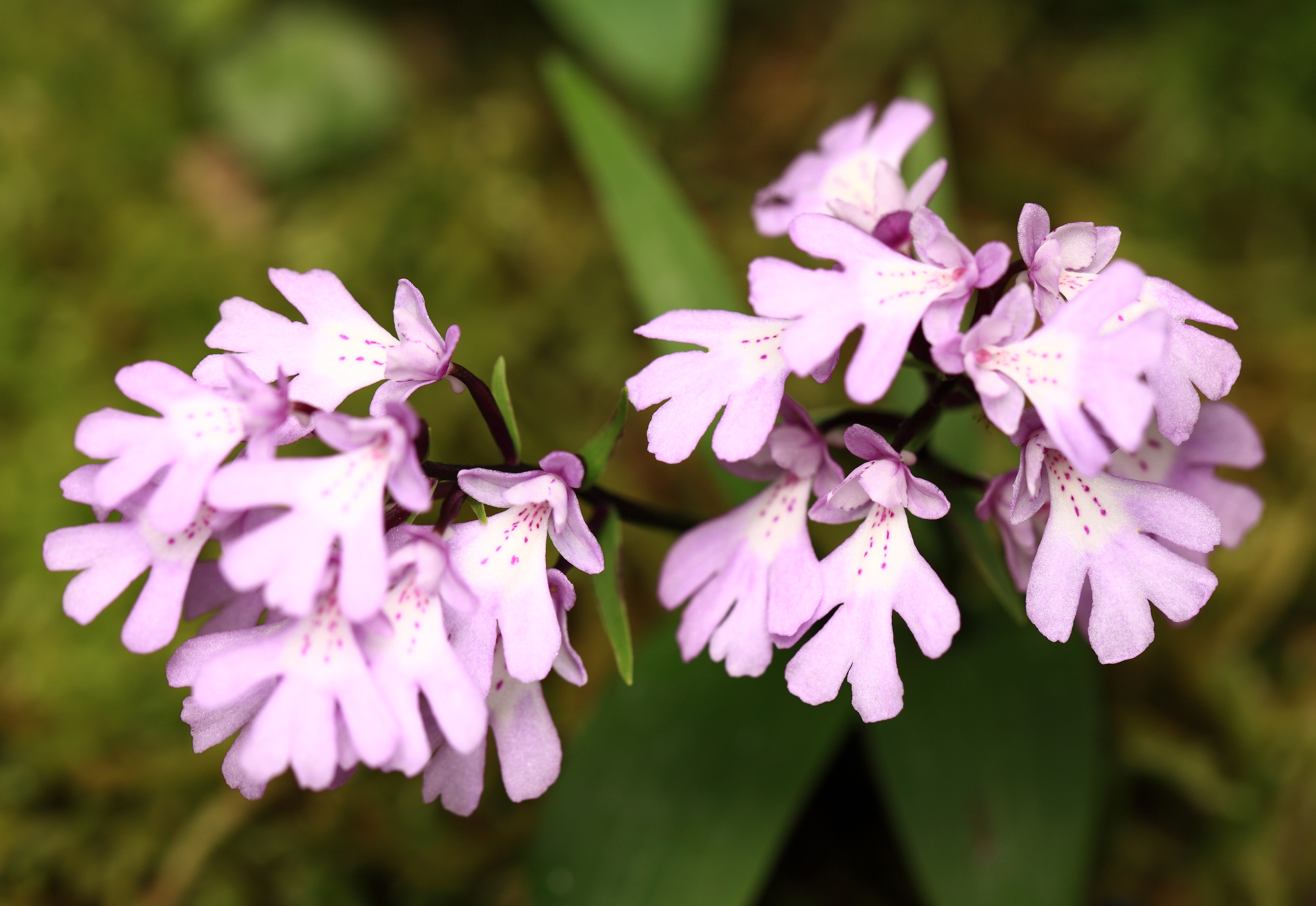

Scientific classification
- Kingdom: Plantae
- Clade: Tracheophytes
- Clade: Angiosperms
- Clade: Monocots
- Order: Asparagales
- Family: Orchidaceae
- Subfamily: Orchidoideae
- Genus: Hemipilia
- Species: H. keiskei

Binomial name
- Hemipilia keiskei (Finet) Y.Tang, H.Peng & T.Yukawa

Synonyms
- Amitostigma keiskei (Finet) Schltr.; Gymnadenia gracilis var. keiskei Finet; Gymnadenia keiskei Maxim., nom. illeg.; Orchis keiskei (Finet) Soó; Ponerorchis keiskei (Finet) X.H.Jin, Schuit. & W.T.Jin

= Hemipilia keiskei =

Species of orchid

Hemipilia keiskei is a species of plant in the family Orchidaceae. The species is endemic to Japan.

== Taxonomy ==
The species was first described in 1879 by Karl Maximovich, using the name "Gymnadenia keiskei". However, this name had already been published in 1878 for a different orchid species, so Maximovich's name was illegitimate. In 1900, Achille Eugène Finet reduced the species to a variety as Gymnadenia gracilis var. keiskei – this was the first legitimate name. In 1919, Friedrich Rudolf Schlechter transferred the species to Amitostigma as Amitostigma keiskei. A molecular phylogenetic study in 2014 included Amitostigma keiskei and found that species of Amitostigma, Neottianthe and Ponerorchis were mixed together in a single clade, making none of the three genera monophyletic as then circumscribed. Amitostigma and Neottianthe were subsumed into Ponerorchis, with this species then becoming Ponerorchis keiskei. The genus Ponerorchis has since been synonymized with the genus Hemipilia, resulting in the present name.
