= Tsaiorchis neottianthoides =

Conservation status
- Vulnerable (IUCN 3.1)

Scientific classification
- Kingdom: Plantae
- Clade: Tracheophytes
- Clade: Angiosperms
- Clade: Monocots
- Order: Asparagales
- Family: Orchidaceae
- Subfamily: Orchidoideae
- Genus: Tsaiorchis
- Species: T. neottianthoides

Binomial name
- Tsaiorchis neottianthoides T.Tang & F.T.Wang

Synonyms
- Platanthera neottianthoides (Tang & F.T.Wang) R.M.Bateman & P.J.Cribb

Species of flowering plant

Tsaiorchis neottianthoides is a species of plant in the family Orchidaceae. It is endemic to China.
