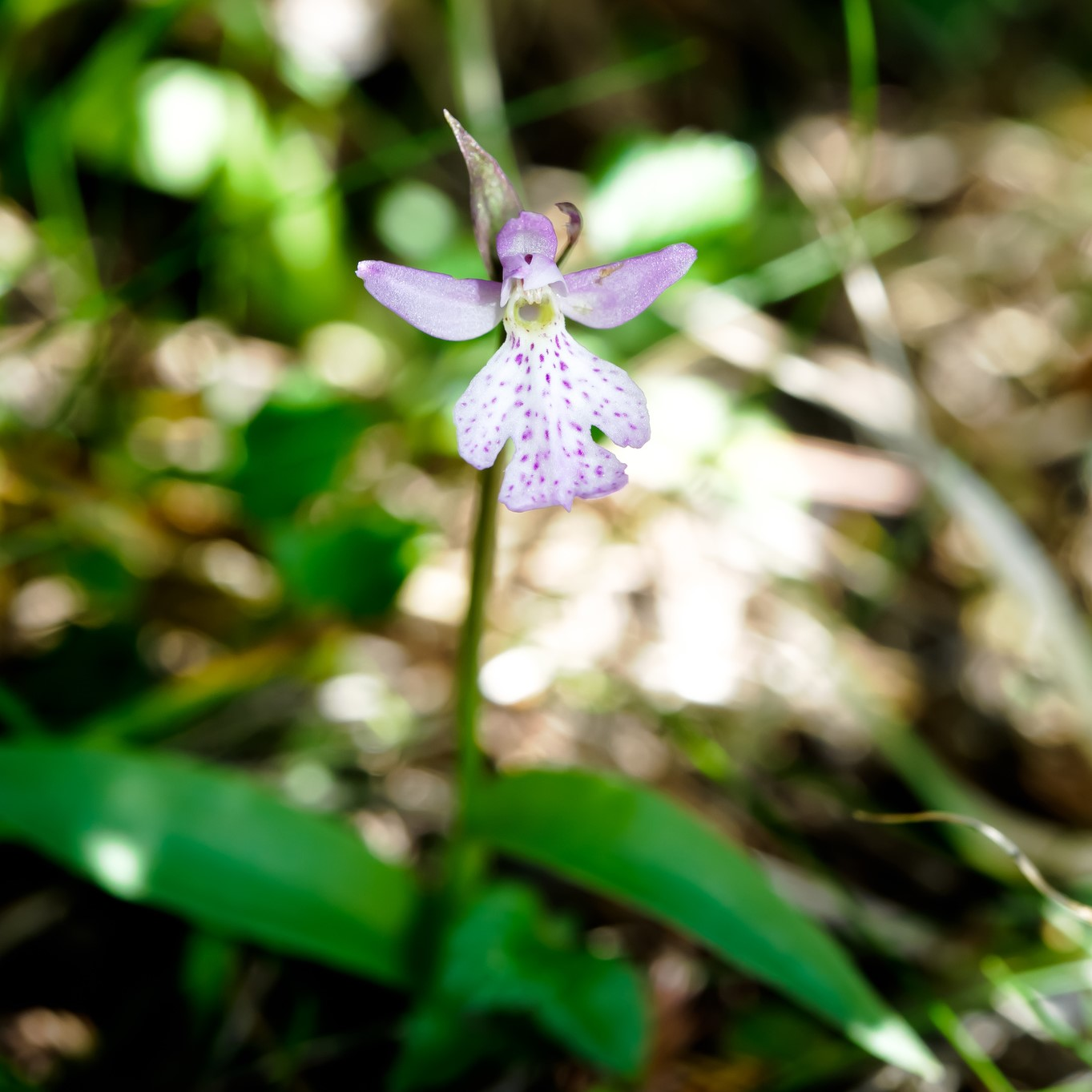

Scientific classification
- Kingdom: Plantae
- Clade: Tracheophytes
- Clade: Angiosperms
- Clade: Monocots
- Order: Asparagales
- Family: Orchidaceae
- Subfamily: Orchidoideae
- Genus: Hemipilia
- Species: H. alpestris

Binomial name
- Hemipilia alpestris (Fukuy.) Y.Tang & H.Peng

Synonyms
- Amitostigma alpestre Fukuy.; Orchis alpestris (Fukuy.) S.S.Ying; Ponerorchis alpestris (Fukuy.) X.H.Jin, Schuit. & W.T.Jin

= Hemipilia alpestris =

Species of flowering plant

Hemipilia alpestris is a species of flowering plant in the family Orchidaceae, native to Taiwan.

== Taxonomy ==
The species was first described in 1935 by Noriaki Fukuyama as Amitostigma alpestre. A molecular phylogenetic study in 2014 found that species of Amitostigma, Neottianthe and Ponerorchis were mixed together in a single clade, making none of the three genera monophyletic as then circumscribed. Amitostigma and Neottianthe were subsumed into Ponerorchis, with this species then becoming Ponerorchis alpestris. The genus Ponerorchis has since been synonymized with the genus Hemipilia, resulting in the present name.
