= Hemipilia gracilis =

Scientific classification
- Kingdom: Plantae
- Clade: Tracheophytes
- Clade: Angiosperms
- Clade: Monocots
- Order: Asparagales
- Family: Orchidaceae
- Subfamily: Orchidoideae
- Genus: Hemipilia
- Species: H. gracilis

Binomial name
- Hemipilia gracilis (Blume) Y.Tang, H.Peng & T.Yukawa

Synonyms
- List: Amitostigma gracile (Blume) Schltr.; Cynorkis gracilis (Blume) Kraenzl.; Gymnadenia gracilis (Blume) Miq.; Gymnadenia mitostigma Makino; Mitostigma gracile Blume; Orchis gracilis (Blume) Soó; Orchis sooi S.S.Ying; Ponerorchis gracilis (Blume) X.H.Jin, Schuit. & W.T.Jin; Amitostigma chinense (Rolfe) Schltr.; Amitostigma formosensis (S.S.Ying) S.S.Ying; Amitostigma yunkianum Fukuy.; Cynorkis chinensis Rolfe; Gymnadenia tryphiiformis Rchb.f.; Orchis formosensis S.S.Ying; Orchis gracilis var. chinensis (Rolfe) Soó; Orchis gracilis var. gracillima Hayata; Orchis yunkiana (Fukuy.) S.S.Ying

Species of orchid

Hemipilia gracilis, commonly known as delicate amitostigma, is a species of plant in the family Orchidaceae. It is widespread across much of eastern Asia where it has been reported from Japan, Korea, Taiwan, and China (Anhui, Fujian, Guangxi, Guizhou, Hebei, Henan, Hubei, Hunan, Jiangsu, Liaoning, Shaanxi, Shandong, Sichuan, and Zhejiang).

== Taxonomy ==
The species was first described by Carl Ludwig Blume in 1856, as Mitostigma gracile. It has been placed in various genera, including Gymnadenia, Orchis and Amitostigma. A molecular phylogenetic study in 2014, in which it was included as Amitostigma gracile, found that species of Amitostigma, Neottianthe and Ponerorchis were mixed together in a single clade, making none of the three genera monophyletic as then circumscribed. Amitostigma and Neottianthe were subsumed into Ponerorchis, with this species then becoming Ponerorchis gracilis. The genus Ponerorchis has since been synonymized with the genus Hemipilia, resulting in the present name.
