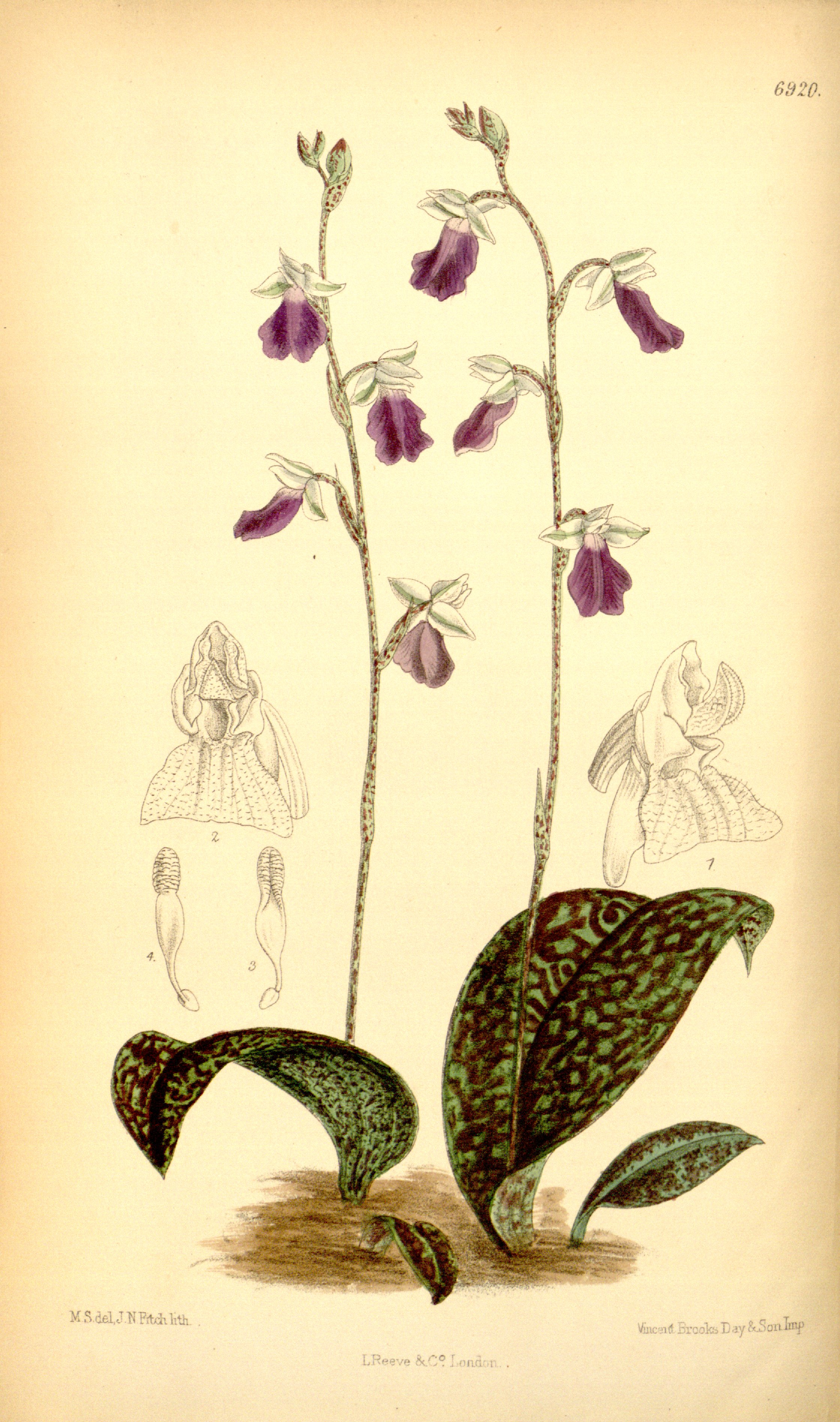
- Hemipilia calophylla 1887 illustration

Scientific classification
- Kingdom: Plantae
- Clade: Tracheophytes
- Clade: Angiosperms
- Clade: Monocots
- Order: Asparagales
- Family: Orchidaceae
- Subfamily: Orchidoideae
- Tribe: Orchideae
- Subtribe: Orchidinae
- Genus: Hemipilia; Lindl.

Synonyms
- List: Amitostigma Schltr.; Apetalanthe Aver. & Vuong; Chusua Nevski; Hemipiliopsis Y.B.Luo & S.C.Chen; Mitostigma Blume; Neottianthe (Rchb.) Schltr.; Phaniasia Blume ex Miq.; Ponerorchis Rchb.f.; Shizhenia X.H.Jin, Lu Q.Huang, W.T.Jin & X.G.Xiang; Symphyosepalum Hand.-Mazz.

= Hemipilia =

Genus of flowering plants

Hemipilia is a genus of plants in the family Orchidaceae. It is native to China, Japan, the Himalayas, Indochina, Siberia, and southern Russia to Poland.

== Species ==
73 species are accepted.

- Hemipilia alpestris (Fukuy.) Y.Tang & H.Peng
- Hemipilia × alpestroides T.C.Hsu
- Hemipilia amplexifolia (Tang & F.T.Wang) Y.Tang & H.Peng
- Hemipilia avisoides Y.Tang, X.M.Wang & H.Peng
- Hemipilia basifoliata (Finet) Y.Tang & H.Peng
- Hemipilia bidupensis Aver.
- Hemipilia bifoliata (Tang & F.T.Wang) Y.Tang & H.Peng
- Hemipilia brevicalcarata Finet
- Hemipilia calcicola (W.W.Sm.) Y.Tang & H.Peng
- Hemipilia calophylla C.S.P.Parish & Rchb.f. - Yunnan, Myanmar, Thailand, Vietnam
- Hemipilia camptoceras (Rolfe ex Hemsl.) Y.Tang & H.Peng
- Hemipilia capitata (Tang & F.T.Wang) Y.Tang & H.Peng
- Hemipilia chusua (D.Don) Y.Tang & H.Peng
- Hemipilia compacta (Schltr.) Y.Tang & H.Peng
- Hemipilia cordifolia Lindl. - Sichuan, Taiwan, Tibet, Yunnan, Bhutan, India, Myanmar, Nepal, Assam
- Hemipilia crassicalcarata S.S.Chien - Shaanxi, Shanxi, Sichuan
- Hemipilia crenulata (Soó) Y.Tang & H.Peng
- Hemipilia cucullata (L.) Y.Tang, H.Peng & T.Yukawa
- Hemipilia discolor Aver. & Averyanova - Vietnam
- Hemipilia dolichocentra (Tang, F.T.Wang & K.Y.Lang) Y.Tang & H.Peng
- Hemipilia exilis (Ames & Schltr.) Y.Tang & H.Peng
- Hemipilia faberi (Rolfe) Y.Tang & H.Peng
- Hemipilia farreri (Schltr.) Y.Tang & H.Peng
- Hemipilia flabellata Bureau & Franch. - Guizhou, Sichuan, Yunnan
- Hemipilia forrestii Rolfe - Tibet, Sichuan, Yunnan
- Hemipilia fujisanensis (Sugim.) Y.Tang, H.Peng & T.Yukawa
- Hemipilia galeata Ying Tang, X.X.Zhu & H.Peng
- Hemipilia gonggashanica (K.Y.Lang) Y.Tang & H.Peng
- Hemipilia gracilis (Blume) Y.Tang, H.Peng & T.Yukawa
- Hemipilia graminifolia (Rchb.f.) Y.Tang, H.Peng & T.Yukawa
- Hemipilia hemipilioides (Finet) Y.Tang & H.Peng
- Hemipilia henryi Rolfe - Sichuan, Hubei
- Hemipilia hui (Tang & F.T.Wang) Schuit.
- Hemipilia joo-iokiana (Makino) Y.Tang, H.Peng & T.Yukawa
- Hemipilia kaiyangense (S.Z.He & Yong Wang) R.Kr.Singh & Sanjeet Kumar
- Hemipilia keiskei (Finet) Y.Tang, H.Peng & T.Yukawa
- Hemipilia kinoshitae (Makino) Y.Tang, H.Peng & T.Yukawa
- Hemipilia kiraishiensis (Hayata) Y.Tang & H.Peng
- Hemipilia kwangsiensis Tang & F.T.Wang ex K.Y.Lang - Yunnan, Guangxi
- Hemipilia lepida (Rchb.f.) Y.Tang, H.Peng & T.Yukawa
- Hemipilia limprichtii Schltr. - Yunnan, Guizhou
- Hemipilia luteola (K.Y.Lang & S.C.Chen) Y.Tang & H.Peng
- Hemipilia × mixta Ormerod
- Hemipilia monantha (Finet) Y.Tang & H.Peng
- Hemipilia nana (King & Pantl.) J.M.H.Shaw
- Hemipilia nanoides (Schuit. & X.H.Jin) R.Kr.Singh & Sanjeet Kumar
- Hemipilia oblonga (K.Y.Lang) Y.Tang & H.Peng
- Hemipilia omeishanica (Tang, F.T.Wang & K.Y.Lang) Y.Tang & H.Peng
- Hemipilia ovata (K.Y.Lang) Y.Tang & H.Peng
- Hemipilia papilionacea (Tang, F.T.Wang & K.Y.Lang) R.Kr.Singh & Sanjeet Kumar
- Hemipilia parceflora (Finet) Y.Tang & H.Peng
- Hemipilia pathakiana (Av.Bhattacharjee) R.Kr.Singh & Sanjeet Kumar
- Hemipilia physoceras (Schltr.) Y.Tang & H.Peng
- Hemipilia pinguicula (Rchb.f. & S.Moore) Y.Tang & H.Peng
- Hemipilia puberula (King & Pantl.) Y.Tang & H.Peng
- Hemipilia pugeensis (K.Y.Lang) Y.Tang & H.Peng
- Hemipilia purpureopunctata (K.Y.Lang) X.H.Jin, Schuit. & W.T.Jin – south-east Tibet to Arunachal Pradesh
- Hemipilia renzii (Deva & H.B.Naithani) Y.Tang & H.Peng
- Hemipilia secundiflora (Kraenzl.) Y.Tang & H.Peng
- Hemipilia sichuanica (K.Y.Lang) Y.Tang & H.Peng
- Hemipilia simplex (Tang & F.T.Wang) Y.Tang & H.Peng
- Hemipilia taiwanensis (Fukuy.) Y.Tang & H.Peng
- Hemipilia takasago-montana (Masam.) Y.Tang & H.Peng
- Hemipilia tetraloba (Finet) Y.Tang & H.Peng
- Hemipilia thailandica (Seidenf. & Thaithong) Y.Tang & H.Peng
- Hemipilia tibetica (Schltr.) Y.Tang & H.Peng
- Hemipilia tominagae (Hayata) Y.Tang & H.Peng
- Hemipilia trifurcata (Tang, F.T.Wang & K.Y.Lang) Y.Tang & H.Peng
- Hemipilia wenshanensis (W.H.Chen, Y.M.Shui & K.Y.Lang) Y.Tang & H.Peng
- Hemipilia wolongensis (G.W.Hu, Yue H.Cheng & Q.F.Wang) R.Kr.Singh & Sanjeet Kumar
- Hemipilia yajiangensis G.W.Hu, Jia X.Yang & Q.F.Wang
- Hemipilia yueana (Tang & F.T.Wang) Y.Tang & H.Peng
- Hemipilia yunnanensis Schltr. - Yunnan
- Hemipilia zhuxiensis Hong Liu
