= List of Inga species =

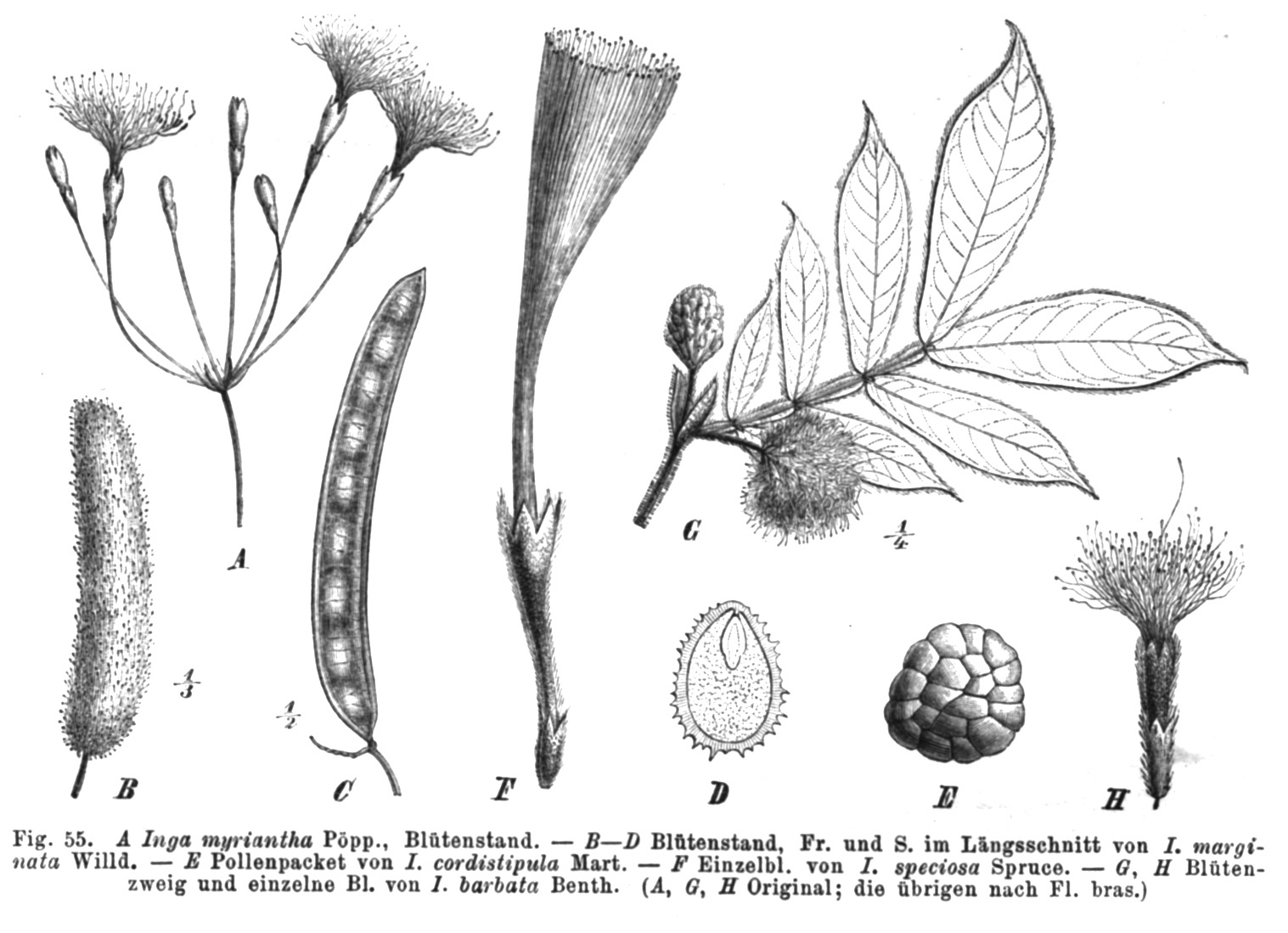
A. Inga umbellifera inflorescence B.-D. Inga semialata inflorescence, fruit, seed E. Inga cordistipula pollen F. Inga amazonica single flower G.-H. Inga barbata branch and single flower

The following species are recognised in the legume genus Inga.

== A ==
- Inga acicularis T.D.Penn.
- Inga acreana Harms
- Inga acrocephala Steud.
- Inga acuminata Benth.
- Inga adenophylla Pittier
- Inga affinis DC.
- Inga alata Benoist
- Inga alba (Sw.) Willd. – White Ice-cream-bean
- Inga aliena J.F.Macbr.
- Inga allenii J.León
- Inga amboroensis T.D.Penn.
- Inga andersonii McVaugh
- Inga appendiculata M.Sousa
- Inga approximata T.D.Penn.
- Inga aptera (Vinha) T.D.Penn.
- Inga arenicola T.D.Penn.
- Inga augusti Harms
- Inga auristellae Harms

== B ==
- Inga balsapambensis T.D.Penn.
- Inga barbata Benth.
- Inga barbourii Standl.
- Inga belizensis Standl.
- Inga bella M.Sousa
- Inga bicoloriflora Ducke
- Inga bifoliolata D.B.O.S.Cardoso & Amorim
- Inga bijuga Schery
- Inga blanchetiana Benth.
- Inga bollandii Sprague & Sandwith
- Inga bourgoni (Aubl.) DC.
- Inga brachyrhachis Harms
- Inga brachystachys Ducke
- Inga bracteifera N.Zamora & T.D.Penn.
- Inga brevipes Benth.
- Inga bullata Benth.
- Inga bullatorugosa Ducke

== C ==
- Inga cabelo T.D.Penn. – Cabelo Ice-cream-bean
- Inga cabrerae M.Sousa
- Inga calantha Ducke
- Inga calanthoides Amshoff
- Inga calcicola M.Sousa
- Inga calderonii Standl.
- Inga canonegrensis N.Zamora & T.D.Penn.
- Inga capitata Desv.
- Inga cardozana L.Cárdenas
- Inga carinata T.D.Penn.
- Inga caudata Killip
- Inga cayennensis Sagot ex Benth.
- Inga cecropietorum Ducke
- Inga chartacea Poepp.
- Inga chiapensis Miranda ex M.Sousa
- Inga chocoensis Killip ex T.S.Elias
- Inga chrysantha Ducke
- Inga ciatiformis J.M.Fern. & F.C.P.Garcia
- Inga ciliata C.Presl
- Inga cinnamomea Spruce ex Benth. – Giant Ice-cream-bean
- Inga cocleensis Pittier
- Inga coleyana M.J.Endara & J.E.Guevara
- Inga colimana Padilla, Cuevas & Solís
- Inga colombiana C.Romero
- Inga conchifolia L.P.Queiroz
- Inga congesta T.D.Penn.
- Inga cookii Pittier
- Inga coragypsea L.Uribe
- Inga cordatoalata Ducke
- Inga cordistipula Mart.
- Inga coruscans Humb. & Bonpl. ex Willd.
- Inga crassiflora Ducke
- Inga cuspidata M.Sousa
- Inga cylindrica (Vell.) Mart.
- Inga cynometrifolia Harms

== D ==
- Inga dasycarpa M.Sousa
- Inga davidsei M.Sousa
- Inga densiflora Benth. – Mountain Ice-cream-bean, Pacay del Monte
- Inga disticha Benth.
- Inga dominicensis Benth.
- Inga duckei Huber
- Inga dwyeri M.Sousa

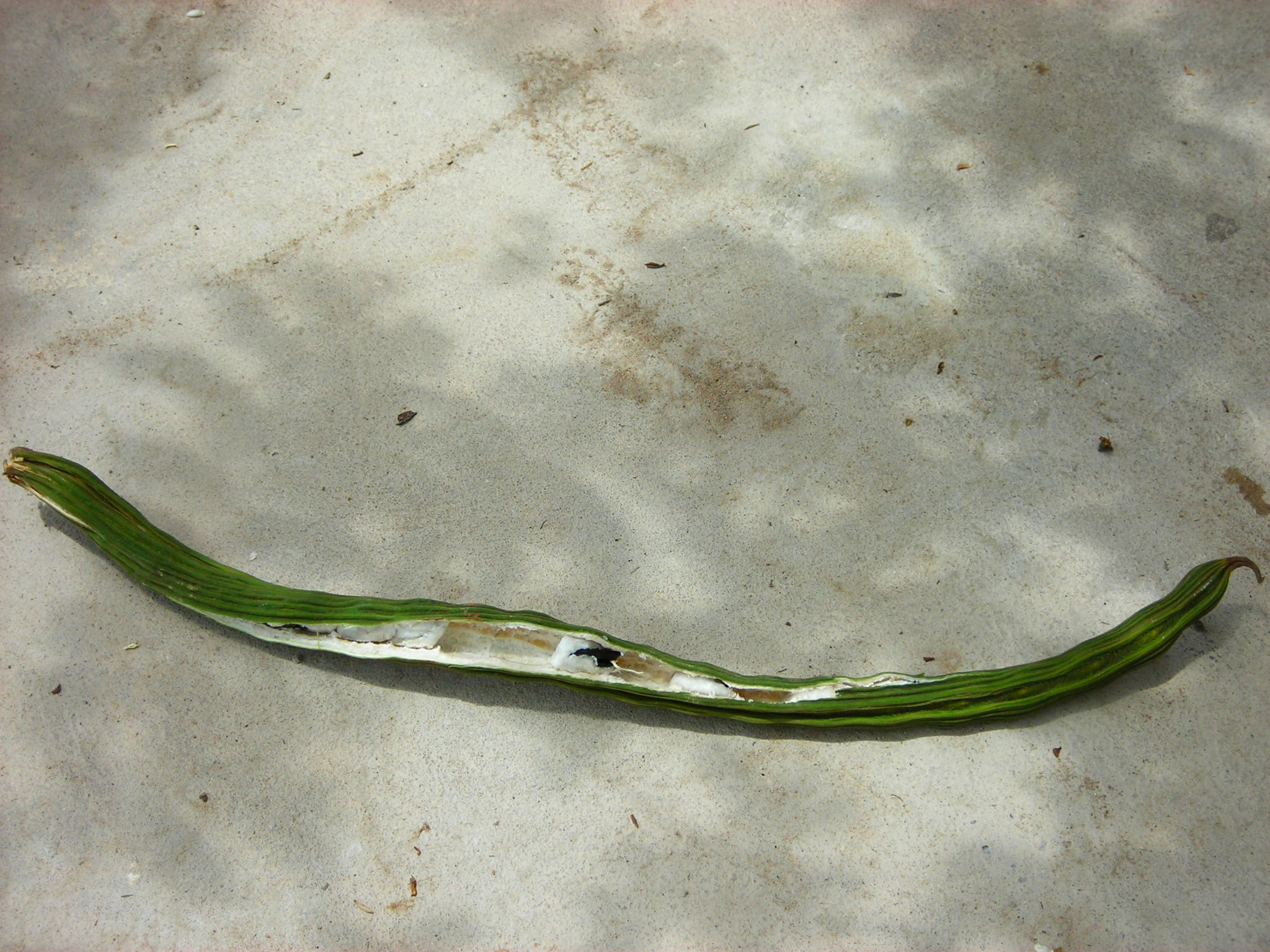
Ice-cream-bean (Inga edulis) pod with some seeds

== E ==
- Inga edulis Mart. – Ice-cream-bean
- Inga edwallii (Harms) T.D.Penn.
- Inga enterolobioides T.D.Penn.
- Inga exalata T.S.Elias
- Inga exfoliata T.D.Penn. & F.C.P.García
- Inga exilis T.D.Penn.
- Inga expansa Rusby
- Inga extra-nodis T.D.Penn.

== F ==
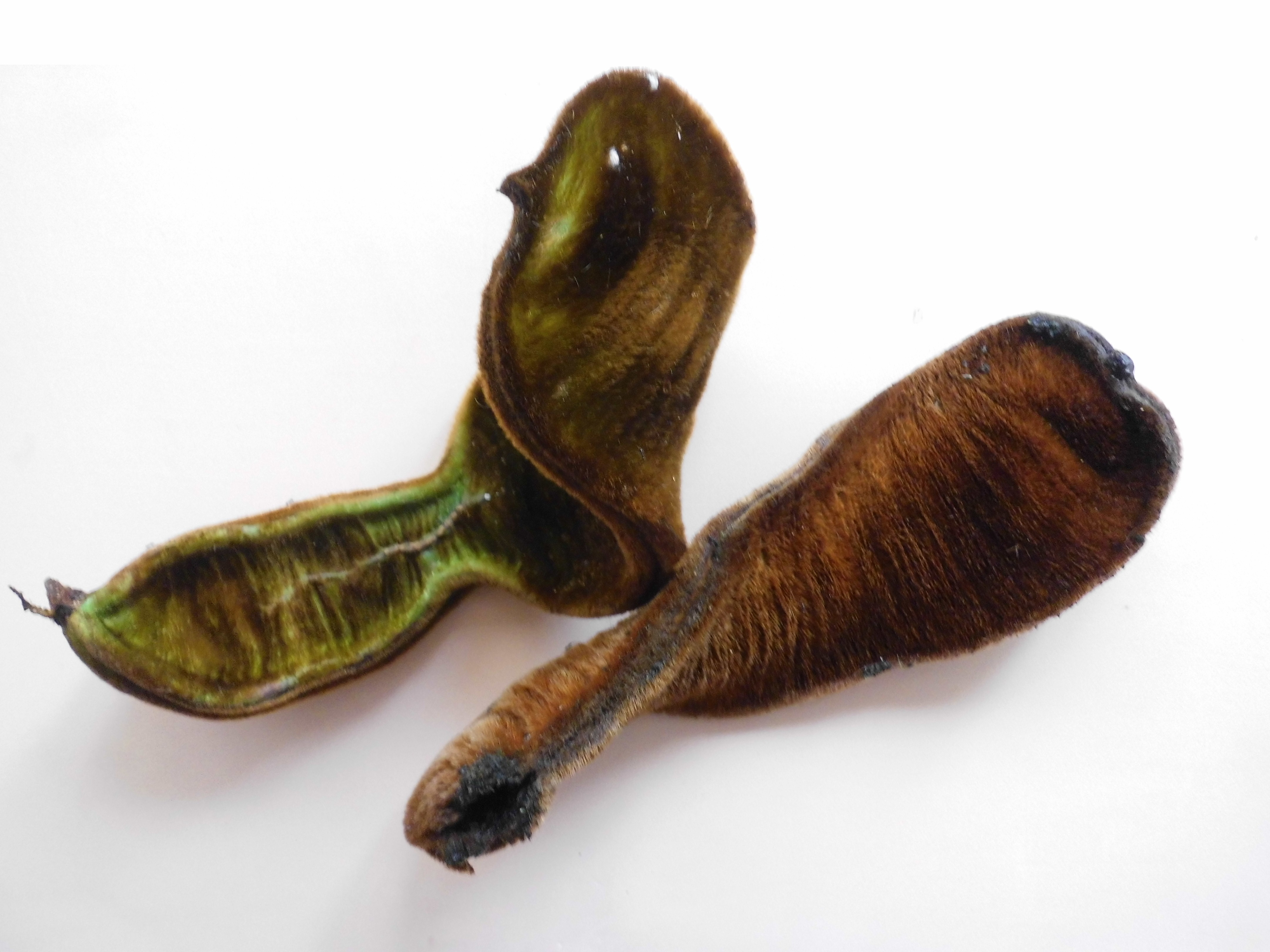
Inga fastuosa

- Inga fanchoniana Poncy
- Inga fastuosa (Jacq.) Willd.
- Inga fendleriana Benth.
- Inga feuilleei DC.
- Inga filiformis N.Zamora
- Inga flagelliformis (Vell.) Mart.
- Inga flexuosa Schltdl.
- Inga fosteriana T.D.Penn.

== G ==
- Inga gereauana (Pipoly & R.Vásquez) T.D.Penn.
- Inga globularis T.D.Penn.
- Inga glomeriflora Ducke
- Inga goldmanii Pittier
- Inga golfodulcensis N.Zamora
- Inga goniocalyx Britton & Killip
- Inga graciliflora Benth.
- Inga gracilifolia Ducke
- Inga gracilior Sprague
- Inga grandis T.D.Penn.
- Inga grazielae (Vinha) T.D.Penn.

== H ==
- Inga hayesii Benth.
- Inga herrerae N.Zamora
- Inga heterophylla Willd.
- Inga hispida Schott ex Benth. – Hairy Ice-cream-bean
- Inga huastecana M.Sousa
- Inga huberi Ducke

== I ==
- Inga ilta T.D.Penn.
- Inga inflata Ducke
- Inga ingoides (Rich.) Willd.
- Inga inicuil Schltdl. & Cham. ex G.Don
- Inga insignis Kunth
- Inga interfluminensis L.Uribe
- Inga interrupta L.Cárdenas & De Martino
- Inga inundata Ducke
- Inga involucrata R.S.Cowan
- Inga ismaelis M.Sousa

== J ==
- Inga japurensis T.D.Penn.
- Inga jaunechensis A.H.Gentry
- Inga jefensis Liesner & D'Arcy
- Inga jenmanii Sandwith
- Inga jimenezii N.Zamora

== K ==
- Inga killipiana J.F.Macbr.
- Inga kursarii M.J.Endara & J.E.Guevara

== L ==
- Inga lactifera M.Sousa
- Inga lacustris M.Sousa
- Inga laevigata M.Martens & Galeotti
- Inga lallensis Spruce ex Benth.
- Inga lanceifolia Benth.
- Inga lateriflora Miq.
- Inga latipes Pittier
- Inga laurina (Sw.) Willd. – Small Ice-cream-bean
- Inga lenticellata Benth.
- Inga lentiscifolia Benth.
- Inga leonis N.Zamora
- Inga leptantha Benth.
- Inga leptingoides Amshoff
- Inga leptocarpa T.D.Penn.
- Inga lineata Benth.
- Inga litoralis N.Zamora
- Inga lomatophylla (Benth.) Pittier
- Inga longiflora Spruce ex Benth.
- Inga longifoliola R.S.Cowan.
- Inga longipedunculata Ducke
- Inga longipes Benth.
- Inga longispica Standl.
- Inga lopadadenia Harms
- Inga loubryana Poncy

== M ==
- Inga macarenensis Philipson
- Inga macrantha J.R.Johnst.
- Inga macrophylla Humb. & Bonpl. ex Willd. – Chinelo Ice-cream-bean
- Inga manabiensis T.D.Penn.
- Inga marginata Willd.
- Inga maritima Benth.
- Inga martinicensis C.Presl
- Inga maynensis Benth.
- Inga megalobotrys T.D.Penn.
- Inga megaphylla Poncy & Vester
- Inga meissneriana Miq.
- Inga melinonis Sagot
- Inga mendoncaei Harms
- Inga mexicana (T.D.Penn.) M.Sousa
- Inga micradenia Spruce ex Benth.
- Inga microcalyx Spruce ex Benth.
- Inga microcoma Harms
- Inga micronectarium J.M.Fern., Soares-Lopes & D.R.Silva
- Inga mitaraka Poncy
- Inga mortoniana J.León
- Inga mucuna Walp.
- Inga multicaulis Spruce ex Benth.
- Inga multijuga Benth.
- Inga multinervis T.D.Penn.

== N ==
- Inga neblinensis L.Cárdenas & De Martino
- Inga nobilis Willd.
- Inga nouragensis Poncy
- Inga nubium Poncy

== O ==
- Inga obidensis Ducke
- Inga obtusata Spruce ex Benth.
- Inga oerstediana Benth.
- Inga ornata Kunth

== P ==
- Inga pachyphylla Harms
- Inga pallida Rusby
- Inga panurensis Spruce ex Benth.
- Inga paraensis Ducke
- Inga paterno Harms
- Inga pauciflora Walp. & Duchass.
- Inga peduncularis Benth.
- Inga pedunculata (Vinha) T.D.Penn.
- Inga pellicula T.D.Penn.
- Inga pezizifera Benth.
- Inga pilosula (Rich.) J.F.Macbr.
- Inga pinetorum Pittier
- Inga pitmanii K.G.Dexter & T.D.Penn.
- Inga platyptera Benth.
- Inga pleiogyna T.D.Penn.
- Inga plumifera Spruce ex Benth.
- Inga pluricarpellata T.D.Penn.
- Inga poeppigiana Benth.
- Inga polita Killip
- Inga polyantha Ducke
- Inga porcata T.D.Penn.
- Inga portobellensis Beurl.
- Inga praegnans T.D.Penn.
- Inga pruriens Poepp.
- Inga pseudoinvolucrata M.Sousa
- Inga psittacorum L.Uribe
- Inga punctata Willd.

== R ==
- Inga retinocarpa Poncy
- Inga rhynchocalyx Sandwith
- Inga rubiginosa (Rich.) DC.
- Inga ruiziana G.Don
- Inga rusbyi Pittier

== S ==
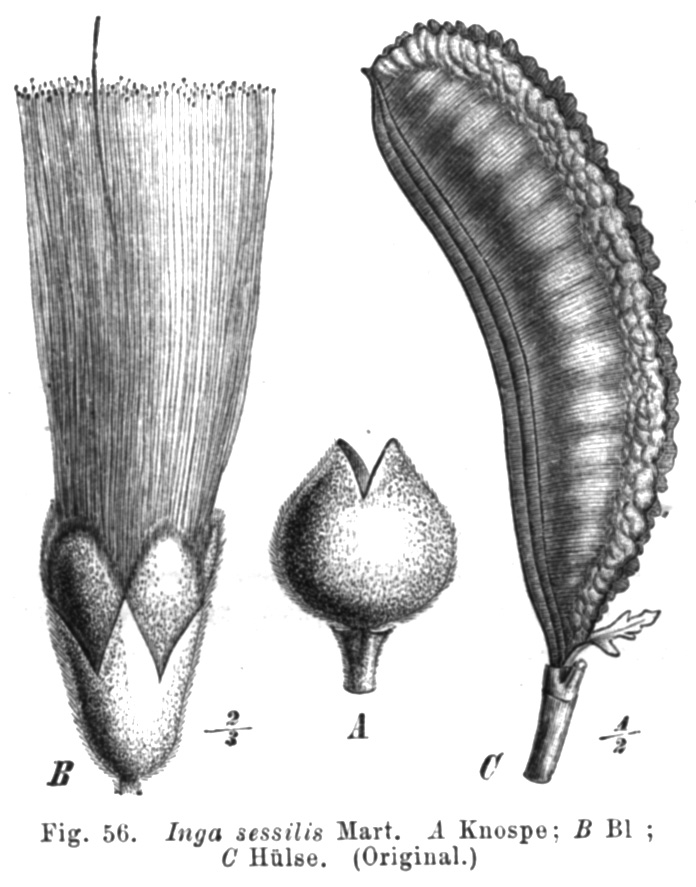
Inga sessilis. A. bud, B. single flower, C. pod

- Inga saffordiana Pittier
- Inga salicifolia T.D.Penn.
- Inga saltensis Burkart
- Inga samanensis L.Uribe
- Inga santaremnensis Ducke
- Inga sapindoides Willd.
- Inga sarayacuensis T.D.Penn.
- Inga sarmentosa Glaz. ex Harms
- Inga sastreana Acev.-Rodr., S.Carrington & T.D.Penn.
- Inga sellowiana Benth.
- Inga sertulifera DC.
- Inga sessilis Mart.
- Inga setosa G.Don
- Inga sierrae Britton & Killip
- Inga silanchensis T.D.Penn.
- Inga sinacae M.Sousa & Ibarra-Manr.
- Inga skutchii Standl.
- Inga spectabilis (Vahl) Willd. – Machete Ice-cream-bean, Guamo Macheto
- Inga spiralis Liesner & D'Arcy
- Inga splendens Willd.
- Inga steinbachii Harms
- Inga stenocalyx Spruce ex Benth.
- Inga stenophylla Standl.
- Inga stenopoda Pittier
- Inga stenoptera Benth.
- Inga stipulacea G.Don
- Inga stipularis DC.
- Inga striata Benth.
- Inga striolata T.D.Penn.
- Inga suaveolens Ducke
- Inga suberosa T.D.Penn.
- Inga subnuda Salzm. ex Benth.
- Inga suborbicularis T.D.Penn.

== T ==
- Inga tarapotensis Spruce ex Benth.
- Inga tayronaensis T.D.Penn.
- Inga tenuicalyx T.D.Penn.
- Inga tenuiloba N.Zamora & T.D.Penn.
- Inga tenuis (Vell.) Mart.
- Inga tenuistipula Ducke
- Inga teresensis F.C.P.Garcia & A.P.Chagas
- Inga tessmannii Harms
- Inga thibaudiana DC.
- Inga tocacheana D.R.Simpson
- Inga tomentosa Benth.' – Fuzzy Ice-cream-bean
- Inga tonduzii Donn.Sm.
- Inga tripa F.C.P.Garcia & A.P.Chagas

== U ==
- Inga ulei Harms
- Inga umbellifera (Vahl) Steud.
- Inga umbilicata (N.Zamora & T.D.Penn.) N.Zamora
- Inga umbratica Poepp.
- Inga unica Barneby & J.W.Grimes
- Inga uraguensis Hook. & Arn.
- Inga urceolata N.Zamora
- Inga ursi Pittier

== V ==
- Inga velutina Willd. – Velvet Ice-cream-bean
- Inga venusta Standl.
- Inga vera Willd. – Churimo Ice-cream-bean
- Inga vestita Benth.
- Inga villosissima Benth.
- Inga virescens Benth.
- Inga virgultosa Desv.
- Inga vismiifolia Poepp.
- Inga vulpina Mart. ex Benth. – Fox Ice-cream-bean

== X ==
- Inga xalapensis Benth.
- Inga xinguensis Ducke

== Y ==
- Inga yacoana J.F.Macbr.
- Inga yasuniana T.D.Penn.
- Inga yungasensis C.Aparicio & A.Fuentes
