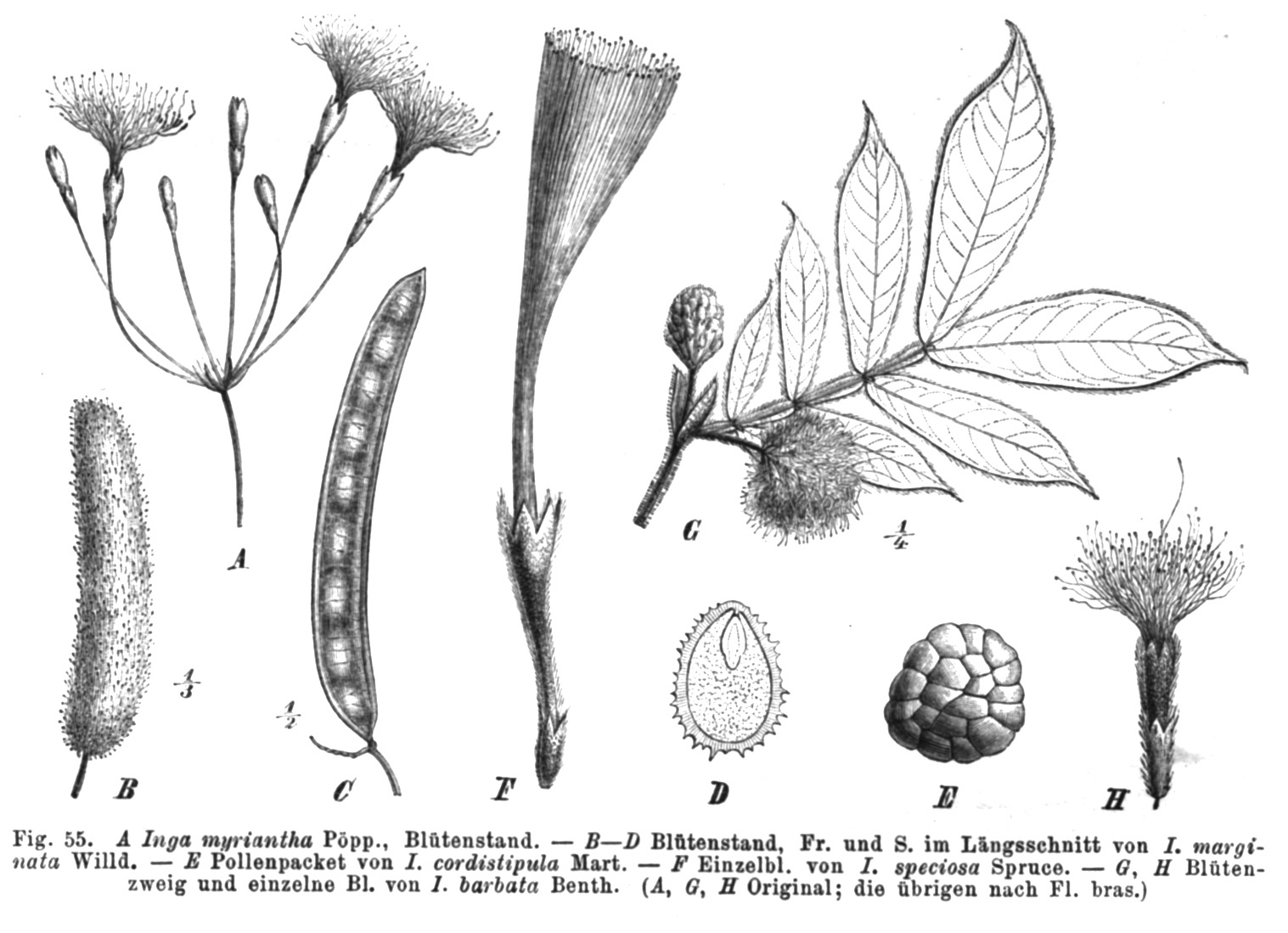
- A. Inga umbellifera inflorescence B.-D. Inga semialata inflorescence, fruit, seed E. Inga cordistipula pollen F. Inga amazonica single flower G.-H. Inga barbata branch and single flower

Conservation status
- Least Concern (IUCN 3.1)

Scientific classification
- Kingdom: Plantae
- Clade: Tracheophytes
- Clade: Angiosperms
- Clade: Eudicots
- Clade: Rosids
- Order: Fabales
- Family: Fabaceae
- Subfamily: Caesalpinioideae
- Clade: Mimosoid clade
- Genus: Inga
- Species: I. barbata

Binomial name
- Inga barbata Benth.

= Inga barbata =

Species of tree

Inga barbata is a species of tree in the family Fabaceae. It was described by English botanist George Bentham. It can be found in Peru and Brazil.
