= Inga goniocalyx =

Conservation status
- Data Deficient (IUCN 3.1)

Scientific classification
- Kingdom: Plantae
- Clade: Embryophytes
- Clade: Tracheophytes
- Clade: Spermatophytes
- Clade: Angiosperms
- Clade: Eudicots
- Clade: Rosids
- Order: Fabales
- Family: Fabaceae
- Subfamily: Caesalpinioideae
- Clade: Mimosoid clade
- Genus: Inga
- Species: I. goniocalyx

Binomial name
- Inga goniocalyx Britton & Killip

Species of legume

Inga goniocalyx is a species of flowering plant in the family Fabaceae. It is found only in Colombia.
