= Inga tenuiloba =

Conservation status
- Endangered (IUCN 3.1)

Scientific classification
- Kingdom: Plantae
- Clade: Tracheophytes
- Clade: Angiosperms
- Clade: Eudicots
- Clade: Rosids
- Order: Fabales
- Family: Fabaceae
- Subfamily: Caesalpinioideae
- Clade: Mimosoid clade
- Genus: Inga
- Species: I. tenuiloba

Binomial name
- Inga tenuiloba N.Zamora & T.D.Penn.

Species of legume

Inga tenuiloba is a species of flowering plant in the family Fabaceae. It is a tree endemic to Costa Rica. It is a small tree, 6 to 10 metres tall, which flowers in November and fruits in September. It is endemic to the Osa Peninsula in southwestern Pacific Costa Rica, where it grows in secondary lowland tropical rain forests and along creeks and near rivers from 50 to 350 metres elevation.
