= Inga exilis =

Conservation status
- Endangered (IUCN 3.1)

Scientific classification
- Kingdom: Plantae
- Clade: Tracheophytes
- Clade: Angiosperms
- Clade: Eudicots
- Clade: Rosids
- Order: Fabales
- Family: Fabaceae
- Subfamily: Caesalpinioideae
- Clade: Mimosoid clade
- Genus: Inga
- Species: I. exilis

Binomial name
- Inga exilis T.D.Penn.

Tree in the pea family

Inga exilis is a species of plant in the pea family. It is found only in Brazil. It is only known from four locations in two states Amazonas in the southern municipality of Lábrea and in Rondônia in Porto Velho municipality.

== Taxonomy ==
Inga exilis was only scientifically described and named in 1997 by Terence Dale Pennington (1938-). It has no subspecies and is classified in the genus Inga as part of the family Fabaceae.
