= Inga mendoncaei =

Conservation status
- Endangered (IUCN 3.1)

Scientific classification
- Kingdom: Plantae
- Clade: Tracheophytes
- Clade: Angiosperms
- Clade: Eudicots
- Clade: Rosids
- Order: Fabales
- Family: Fabaceae
- Subfamily: Caesalpinioideae
- Clade: Mimosoid clade
- Genus: Inga
- Species: I. mendoncaei

Binomial name
- Inga mendoncaei Harms

Species of legume

Inga mendoncaei is a species of legume in the family Fabaceae. The plant is endemic to the Atlantic Forest ecoregion in southeastern Brazil. It is assessed as endangered on the IUCN Red List.
