= Inga suberosa =

Conservation status
- Endangered (IUCN 3.1)

Scientific classification
- Kingdom: Plantae
- Clade: Tracheophytes
- Clade: Angiosperms
- Clade: Eudicots
- Clade: Rosids
- Order: Fabales
- Family: Fabaceae
- Subfamily: Caesalpinioideae
- Clade: Mimosoid clade
- Genus: Inga
- Species: I. suberosa

Binomial name
- Inga suberosa T.D.Penn.

Species of legume

Inga suberosa is a species of flowering plant in the family Fabaceae. It is a tree endemic to northern Brazil. It grows in lowland terre firme Amazon rainforest in the states of Amazonas and Pará.
