= Inga hayesii =

Conservation status
- Least Concern (IUCN 3.1)

Scientific classification
- Kingdom: Plantae
- Clade: Tracheophytes
- Clade: Angiosperms
- Clade: Eudicots
- Clade: Rosids
- Order: Fabales
- Family: Fabaceae
- Subfamily: Caesalpinioideae
- Clade: Mimosoid clade
- Genus: Inga
- Species: I. hayesii

Binomial name
- Inga hayesii Benth.

Species of legume

Inga hayesii is a species of plant in the family Fabaceae. It is found in Colombia, Costa Rica, Ecuador, Nicaragua, Panama, and Peru. It is threatened by habitat loss.
