= Inga latipes =

Conservation status
- Vulnerable (IUCN 3.1)

Scientific classification
- Kingdom: Plantae
- Clade: Embryophytes
- Clade: Tracheophytes
- Clade: Spermatophytes
- Clade: Angiosperms
- Clade: Eudicots
- Clade: Rosids
- Order: Fabales
- Family: Fabaceae
- Subfamily: Caesalpinioideae
- Clade: Mimosoid clade
- Genus: Inga
- Species: I. latipes

Binomial name
- Inga latipes Pittier

Species of legume

Inga latipes is a species of flowering plant in the family Fabaceae. It is a tree native to Costa Rica and Colombia, where it is known from a single location. It is a medium to large tree, 7 to 30 metres tall, which flowers in August and September and fruits in March, June, July and August. It grows in lowland and montane rain forests, including wet and pluvial premontane and montane forests and cloud forests, at elevations of 450 to 1,700 metres elevation.
