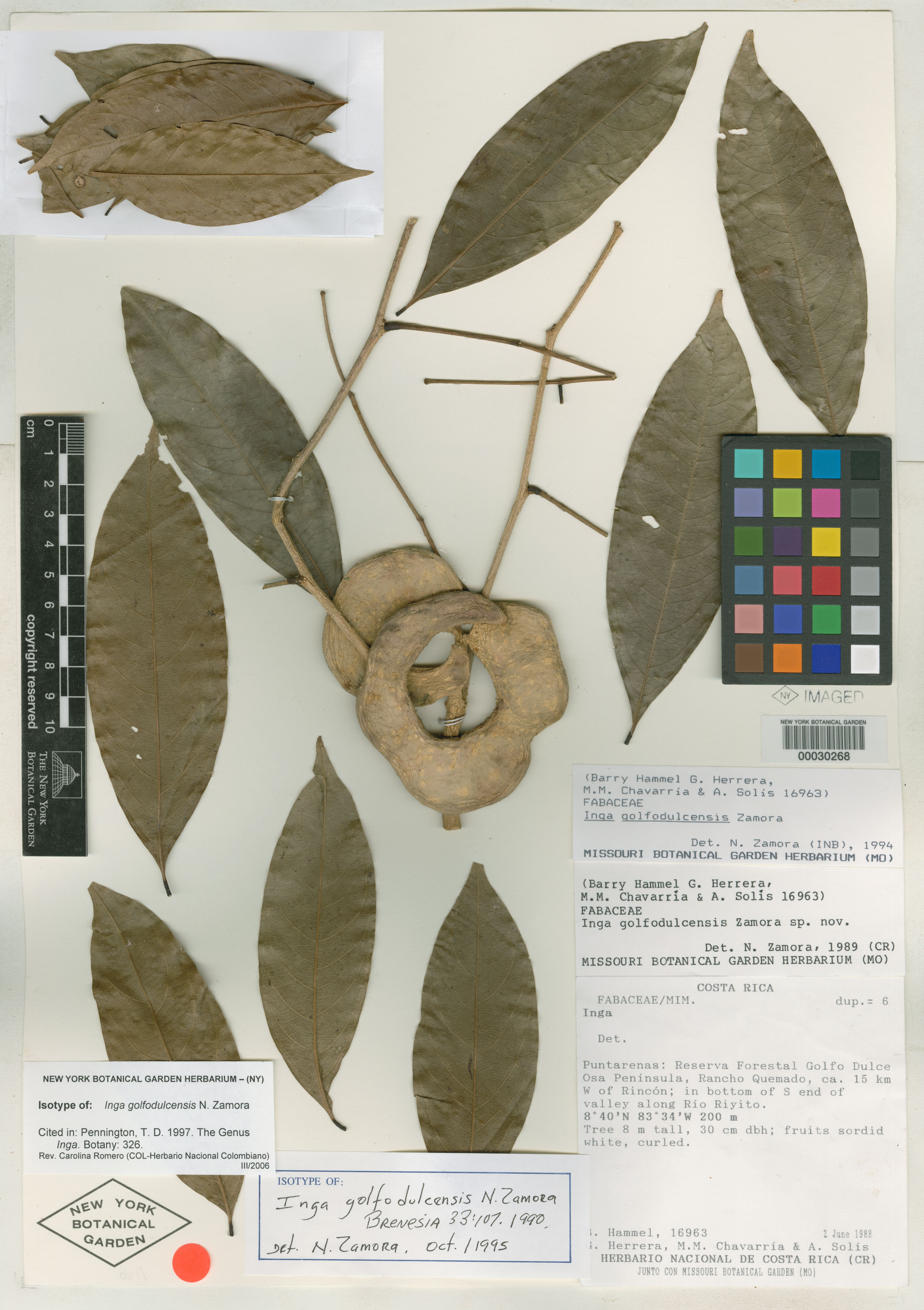

Conservation status
- Endangered (IUCN 3.1)

Scientific classification
- Kingdom: Plantae
- Clade: Embryophytes
- Clade: Tracheophytes
- Clade: Spermatophytes
- Clade: Angiosperms
- Clade: Eudicots
- Clade: Rosids
- Order: Fabales
- Family: Fabaceae
- Subfamily: Caesalpinioideae
- Clade: Mimosoid clade
- Genus: Inga
- Species: I. golfodulcensis

Binomial name
- Inga golfodulcensis N.Zamora

= Inga golfodulcensis =

Species of legume

Inga golfodulcensis is a species of plant in the family Fabaceae. It is found in Costa Rica and possibly Colombia.
