= Inga allenii =

Conservation status
- Vulnerable (IUCN 3.1)

Scientific classification
- Kingdom: Plantae
- Clade: Tracheophytes
- Clade: Angiosperms
- Clade: Eudicots
- Clade: Rosids
- Order: Fabales
- Family: Fabaceae
- Subfamily: Caesalpinioideae
- Clade: Mimosoid clade
- Genus: Inga
- Species: I. allenii

Binomial name
- Inga allenii J. León
- Distribution map of Inga allenii

Species of legume

Inga allenii is a species of plant in the family Fabaceae. It is found in Colombia, Costa Rica, and Panama. It is threatened by habitat loss.
