= Inga saffordiana =

Conservation status
- Least Concern (IUCN 3.1)

Scientific classification
- Kingdom: Plantae
- Clade: Tracheophytes
- Clade: Angiosperms
- Clade: Eudicots
- Clade: Rosids
- Order: Fabales
- Family: Fabaceae
- Subfamily: Caesalpinioideae
- Clade: Mimosoid clade
- Genus: Inga
- Species: I. saffordiana

Binomial name
- Inga saffordiana Pitt.

Species of legume

Inga saffordiana is a species of plant in the family Fabaceae. It is found in Colombia and Panama. It is threatened by habitat loss.
