= Inga adenophylla =

Conservation status
- Least Concern (IUCN 3.1)

Scientific classification
- Kingdom: Plantae
- Clade: Tracheophytes
- Clade: Angiosperms
- Clade: Eudicots
- Clade: Rosids
- Order: Fabales
- Family: Fabaceae
- Subfamily: Caesalpinioideae
- Clade: Mimosoid clade
- Genus: Inga
- Species: I. adenophylla

Binomial name
- Inga adenophylla Pittier

Species of plant

Inga adenophylla is a species of tree in the family Fabaceae. It is native to South America, particularly the countries of Bolivia and Peru.

== Description ==
Inga adenophylla is a small tree that grows from 300 – 2800 meters in elevation. Inga adenophylla grows in the countries of Bolivia and Peru. The fruit pulp produced by the tree tastes sweet and is edible. The tree is sometimes used to provide shade for workers at coffee and tea plantations.
