= Inga disticha =

Scientific classification
- Kingdom: Plantae
- Clade: Tracheophytes
- Clade: Angiosperms
- Clade: Eudicots
- Clade: Rosids
- Order: Fabales
- Family: Fabaceae
- Subfamily: Caesalpinioideae
- Clade: Mimosoid clade
- Genus: Inga
- Species: I. disticha

Binomial name
- Inga disticha Benth.

Species of legume

Inga disticha is a species of Fabaceae that was described by botanist George Bentham.
