= Inga mucuna =

Conservation status
- Least Concern (IUCN 3.1)

Scientific classification
- Kingdom: Plantae
- Clade: Tracheophytes
- Clade: Angiosperms
- Clade: Eudicots
- Clade: Rosids
- Order: Fabales
- Family: Fabaceae
- Subfamily: Caesalpinioideae
- Clade: Mimosoid clade
- Genus: Inga
- Species: I. mucuna

Binomial name
- Inga mucuna Walp. & Duchass.

Species of legume

Inga mucuna is a species of plant in the family Fabaceae. It is a tree of moist tropical lowland forest growing up to 10 m tall (exceptionally 20 m) with a trunk diameter around 0.5 m.

The large leaves consist of three or four pairs of leaflets with dense hairs along the edges and veins.

It has been used for firewood. The large seedpods (typically around 30 cm long and 5 cm wide) contain an edible pulp. It is found in Colombia and Panama. It is threatened by habitat loss.

The first description of the species was published in 1852.
