= Inga jimenezii =

Conservation status
- Vulnerable (IUCN 3.1)

Scientific classification
- Kingdom: Plantae
- Clade: Embryophytes
- Clade: Tracheophytes
- Clade: Spermatophytes
- Clade: Angiosperms
- Clade: Eudicots
- Clade: Rosids
- Order: Fabales
- Family: Fabaceae
- Subfamily: Caesalpinioideae
- Clade: Mimosoid clade
- Genus: Inga
- Species: I. jimenezii

Binomial name
- Inga jimenezii N.Zamora

Species of legume

Inga jimenezii is a species of flowering plant in the family Fabaceae. It is a large shrub or small tree native to Costa Rica and Panama. It grows up to 10 metres tall, flowers in January and March, and fruits in September. It is known from the southwestern Pacific coast of Costa Rica and Darien Province of eastern Panama, where it grows in tropical lowland seasonal rain forest and seasonal premontane rain forest up to 1,500 metres elevation.
