= Inga litoralis =

Conservation status
- Near Threatened (IUCN 3.1)

Scientific classification
- Kingdom: Plantae
- Clade: Embryophytes
- Clade: Tracheophytes
- Clade: Spermatophytes
- Clade: Angiosperms
- Clade: Eudicots
- Clade: Rosids
- Order: Fabales
- Family: Fabaceae
- Subfamily: Caesalpinioideae
- Clade: Mimosoid clade
- Genus: Inga
- Species: I. litoralis

Binomial name
- Inga litoralis N.Zamora

Species of legume

Inga litoralis is a species of flowering plant in the family Fabaceae. It is a tree endemic to Costa Rica. It is a small or medium-sized tree which grows 4–15 (–20) metres tall and flowers in February to April and fruits in January, July, August, and September. It is native to the Pacific coast, where it grows in lowland tropical seasonal and evergreen rain forest up to 500 metres elevation.
