= Inga praegnans =

Conservation status
- Endangered (IUCN 3.1)

Scientific classification
- Kingdom: Plantae
- Clade: Tracheophytes
- Clade: Angiosperms
- Clade: Eudicots
- Clade: Rosids
- Order: Fabales
- Family: Fabaceae
- Subfamily: Caesalpinioideae
- Clade: Mimosoid clade
- Genus: Inga
- Species: I. praegnans

Binomial name
- Inga praegnans T.D.Penn.

Species of legume

Inga praegnans is a species of plant in the family Fabaceae. It is found only in the Brazilian state of São Paulo, near the Serra do Mar mountains. This tree flowers in February and March and bears fruit in November.
