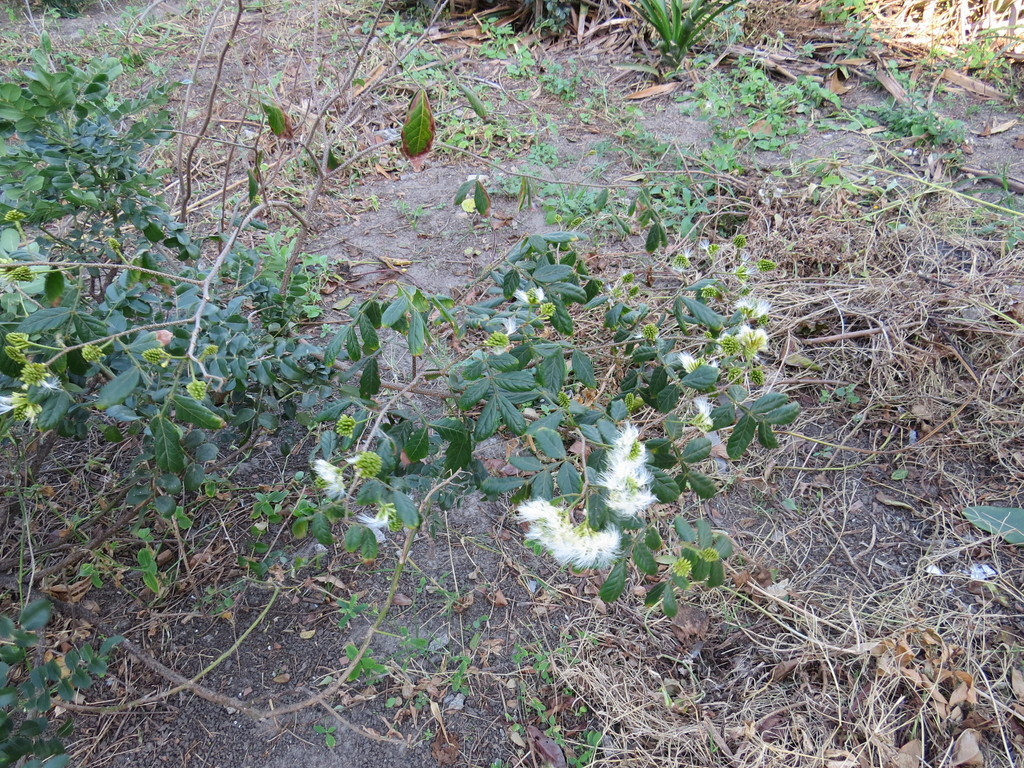

Conservation status
- Endangered (IUCN 2.3)

Scientific classification
- Kingdom: Plantae
- Clade: Embryophytes
- Clade: Tracheophytes
- Clade: Spermatophytes
- Clade: Angiosperms
- Clade: Eudicots
- Clade: Rosids
- Order: Fabales
- Family: Fabaceae
- Subfamily: Caesalpinioideae
- Clade: Mimosoid clade
- Genus: Inga
- Species: I. maritima

Binomial name
- Inga maritima Benth.

Synonyms
- Feuilleea maritima (Benth.) Kuntze

= Inga maritima =

Species of plant

Inga maritima is a species of plant in the family Fabaceae, clade Mimosoideae. It grows in shrubs or trees of 1-6m (~3-20ft), it has compound leaves with 2-3 pairs of leaflets, a winged foliar rachis and trichomes in both surfaces.

It is found in the restingas (sandy coastal plains) of the southeast region of Brazil. Although originally thought to occur only in the state of Rio de Janeiro, the species was registered in the state of Espírito Santo in a 2014 thesis research.. It is also native to Colombia, where it grows in the Amazon Basin, Cauca Valley, and Sucre Department in the Caribbean coastal region.
