= Inga balsapambensis =

Conservation status
- Vulnerable (IUCN 3.1)

Scientific classification
- Kingdom: Plantae
- Clade: Tracheophytes
- Clade: Angiosperms
- Clade: Eudicots
- Clade: Rosids
- Order: Fabales
- Family: Fabaceae
- Subfamily: Caesalpinioideae
- Clade: Mimosoid clade
- Genus: Inga
- Species: I. balsapambensis

Binomial name
- Inga balsapambensis T.D. Penn.

Species of legume

Inga balsapambensis is a species of plant in the family Fabaceae. It is found only in Ecuador. Its natural habitat is subtropical or tropical moist montane forests.
