= Inga lacustris =

Conservation status
- Critically Endangered (IUCN 3.1)

Scientific classification
- Kingdom: Plantae
- Clade: Tracheophytes
- Clade: Angiosperms
- Clade: Eudicots
- Clade: Rosids
- Order: Fabales
- Family: Fabaceae
- Subfamily: Caesalpinioideae
- Clade: Mimosoid clade
- Genus: Inga
- Species: I. lacustris

Binomial name
- Inga lacustris M.Sousa

Species of legume

Inga lacustris is a species of plant in the family Fabaceae. It is a tree endemic to Veracruz state in eastern Mexico. It is threatened by habitat loss, and the IUCN Red List assesses the species as Critically Endangered.
