= Inga striata =

Conservation status
- Least Concern (IUCN 3.1)

Scientific classification
- Kingdom: Plantae
- Clade: Tracheophytes
- Clade: Angiosperms
- Clade: Eudicots
- Clade: Rosids
- Order: Fabales
- Family: Fabaceae
- Subfamily: Caesalpinioideae
- Clade: Mimosoid clade
- Genus: Inga
- Species: I. striata

Binomial name
- Inga striata Benth.

Synonyms
- Feuilleea catharinae; Feuilleea salzmanniana; Inga canaminensis; Inga catharinae; Inga comewynensis; Inga ellsworthiana; Inga perrottetii; Inga prieurii; Inga salzmanniana

Species of plant

Inga striata is a perennial tree species and is a member of the family Fabaceae. This species occurs in countries like Bolivia, Brazil, Colombia, Ecuador, Guyana, Peru, Suriname and the territory of French Guiana. It is uncertain if it occurs in Venezuela.

Trees can grow up to 20 m. Inga striata have less stomatal conductance and transpiration in soil polluted with clomazone.
