= Inga flexuosa =

Conservation status
- Least Concern (IUCN 3.1)

Scientific classification
- Kingdom: Plantae
- Clade: Tracheophytes
- Clade: Angiosperms
- Clade: Eudicots
- Clade: Rosids
- Order: Fabales
- Family: Fabaceae
- Subfamily: Caesalpinioideae
- Clade: Mimosoid clade
- Genus: Inga
- Species: I. flexuosa

Binomial name
- Inga flexuosa Schltdl.

Synonyms
- List: Inga schiedeana Steud.; Inga davidsoniae Standl.; Inga hintonii Sandwith; Inga micheliana Harms; Inga nubigena Ant.Molina; Inga pringlei Harms; Inga tenella M.Sousa

Species of legume

Inga flexuosa, known as the cuajiniquil, guaba de montaña, guajinicuil, or jacanaquil, is a species in the Fabaceae family. It is found in Costa Rica, Guatemala, Honduras, Mexico, Nicaragua, and Panama.
