= Inga bracteifera =

Conservation status
- Endangered (IUCN 3.1)

Scientific classification
- Kingdom: Plantae
- Clade: Embryophytes
- Clade: Tracheophytes
- Clade: Spermatophytes
- Clade: Angiosperms
- Clade: Eudicots
- Clade: Rosids
- Order: Fabales
- Family: Fabaceae
- Subfamily: Caesalpinioideae
- Clade: Mimosoid clade
- Genus: Inga
- Species: I. bracteifera

Binomial name
- Inga bracteifera N.Zamora & T.D.Penn.

Species of legume

Inga bracteifera is a species of plant in the family Fabaceae. It is a tree endemic to Costa Rica. It is a small tree, 4 to 10 metres tall, which grows in humid lowland forest in southern Pacific slope of Costa Rica, including the Buenos Aires Valley, up to 500 metres elevation.
