= Inga cabelo =

Conservation status
- Vulnerable (IUCN 3.1)

Scientific classification
- Kingdom: Plantae
- Clade: Embryophytes
- Clade: Tracheophytes
- Clade: Spermatophytes
- Clade: Angiosperms
- Clade: Eudicots
- Clade: Rosids
- Order: Fabales
- Family: Fabaceae
- Subfamily: Caesalpinioideae
- Clade: Mimosoid clade
- Genus: Inga
- Species: I. cabelo

Binomial name
- Inga cabelo T.D.Penn.

Species of legume

Inga cabelo is a species of flowering plant in the family Fabaceae. It is a tree endemic to southeastern Brazil.
