= Inga pedunculata =

Conservation status
- Endangered (IUCN 3.1)

Scientific classification
- Kingdom: Plantae
- Clade: Tracheophytes
- Clade: Angiosperms
- Clade: Eudicots
- Clade: Rosids
- Order: Fabales
- Family: Fabaceae
- Subfamily: Caesalpinioideae
- Clade: Mimosoid clade
- Genus: Inga
- Species: I. pedunculata

Binomial name
- Inga pedunculata (Vinha) T.D.Penn.

Synonyms
- Affonsea pedunculata Vinha

Species of legume

Inga pedunculata is a species of plant in the family Fabaceae. It is a tree native to French Guiana and northeastern Brazil. It Brazil it grows in humid evergreen Atlantic rainforest and restingas (coastal rainforests on sandy soil).
