= Inga lanceifolia =

Conservation status
- Least Concern (IUCN 3.1)

Scientific classification
- Kingdom: Plantae
- Clade: Embryophytes
- Clade: Tracheophytes
- Clade: Spermatophytes
- Clade: Angiosperms
- Clade: Eudicots
- Clade: Rosids
- Order: Fabales
- Family: Fabaceae
- Subfamily: Caesalpinioideae
- Clade: Mimosoid clade
- Genus: Inga
- Species: I. lanceifolia

Binomial name
- Inga lanceifolia Benth.

Synonyms
- Feuilleea lanceifolia (Benth.) Kuntze

Species of legume

Inga lanceifolia is a species of flowering plant in the family Fabaceae. It is a tree endemic to southeastern Brazil. It is a large shrub or small tree up to 10 metres tall. It grows in coastal lowland and montane rain forest in Espírito Santo and Rio de Janeiro states.
