= Inga enterolobioides =

Conservation status
- Critically Endangered (IUCN 2.3)

Scientific classification
- Kingdom: Plantae
- Clade: Tracheophytes
- Clade: Angiosperms
- Clade: Eudicots
- Clade: Rosids
- Order: Fabales
- Family: Fabaceae
- Subfamily: Caesalpinioideae
- Clade: Mimosoid clade
- Genus: Inga
- Species: I. enterolobioides

Binomial name
- Inga enterolobioides T.D.Penn.

Species of legume

Inga enterolobioides is a species of flowering plant in the family Fabaceae. It is a tree endemic to Rio de Janeiro state in southeastern Brazil.

The species was first described by Terence Dale Pennington in 1997.
