= Inga platyptera =

Conservation status
- Endangered (IUCN 2.3)

Scientific classification
- Kingdom: Plantae
- Clade: Tracheophytes
- Clade: Angiosperms
- Clade: Eudicots
- Clade: Rosids
- Order: Fabales
- Family: Fabaceae
- Subfamily: Caesalpinioideae
- Clade: Mimosoid clade
- Genus: Inga
- Species: I. platyptera

Binomial name
- Inga platyptera Benth.

Species of legume

Inga platyptera is a species of plant in the family Fabaceae. The plant is endemic to the Atlantic Forest ecoregion in southeastern Brazil. It is assessed as endangered on the IUCN Red List.
