= Inga jaunechensis =

Conservation status
- Vulnerable (IUCN 3.1)

Scientific classification
- Kingdom: Plantae
- Clade: Embryophytes
- Clade: Tracheophytes
- Clade: Spermatophytes
- Clade: Angiosperms
- Clade: Eudicots
- Clade: Rosids
- Order: Fabales
- Family: Fabaceae
- Subfamily: Caesalpinioideae
- Clade: Mimosoid clade
- Genus: Inga
- Species: I. jaunechensis

Binomial name
- Inga jaunechensis A.H.Gentry

Synonyms
- Inga hedgerae G.P.Lewis

Species of legume

Inga jaunechensis is a species of flowering plant in the family Fabaceae. It is a tree native to northwestern Ecuador. Its natural habitat is lowland tropical moist forests up to 500 metres elevation.

The species was described by Alwyn Gentry in 1984.
