= Inga macarenensis =

Conservation status
- Near Threatened (IUCN 3.1)

Scientific classification
- Kingdom: Plantae
- Clade: Tracheophytes
- Clade: Angiosperms
- Clade: Eudicots
- Clade: Rosids
- Order: Fabales
- Family: Fabaceae
- Subfamily: Caesalpinioideae
- Clade: Mimosoid clade
- Genus: Inga
- Species: I. macarenensis

Binomial name
- Inga macarenensis Philipson

Species of legume

Inga macarenensis is a species of plant in the family Fabaceae. It is found only in Colombia.
