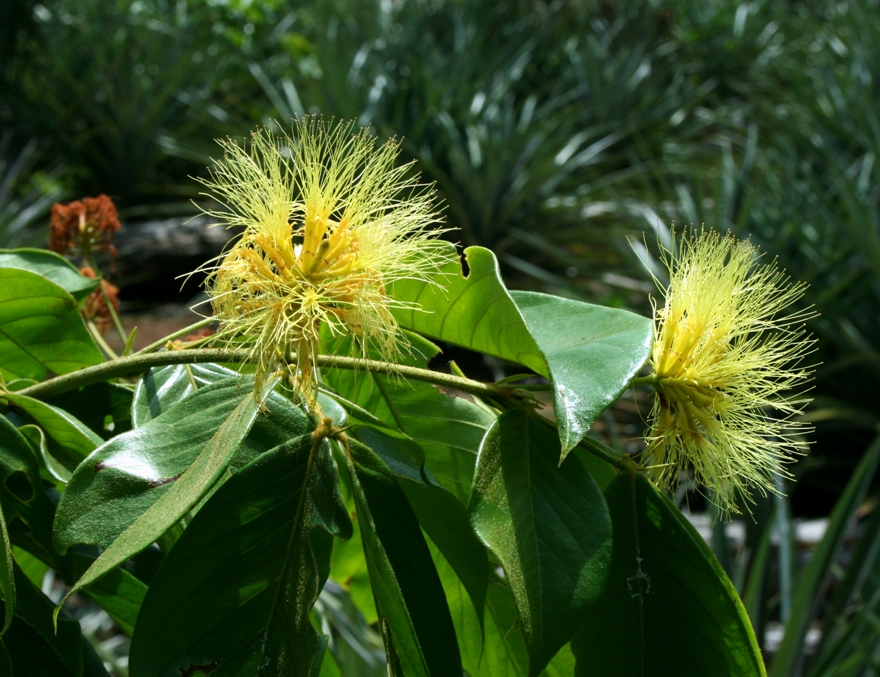

Scientific classification
- Kingdom: Plantae
- Clade: Tracheophytes
- Clade: Angiosperms
- Clade: Eudicots
- Clade: Rosids
- Order: Fabales
- Family: Fabaceae
- Subfamily: Caesalpinioideae
- Clade: Mimosoid clade
- Genus: Inga
- Species: I. pilosula

Binomial name
- Inga pilosula (Rich.) J.F. Macbr. 1943

= Inga pilosula =

Species of legume

Inga pilosula is a species of plant in the family Fabaceae. It is found in Brazil, the Caribbean, Bolivia and Peru.
