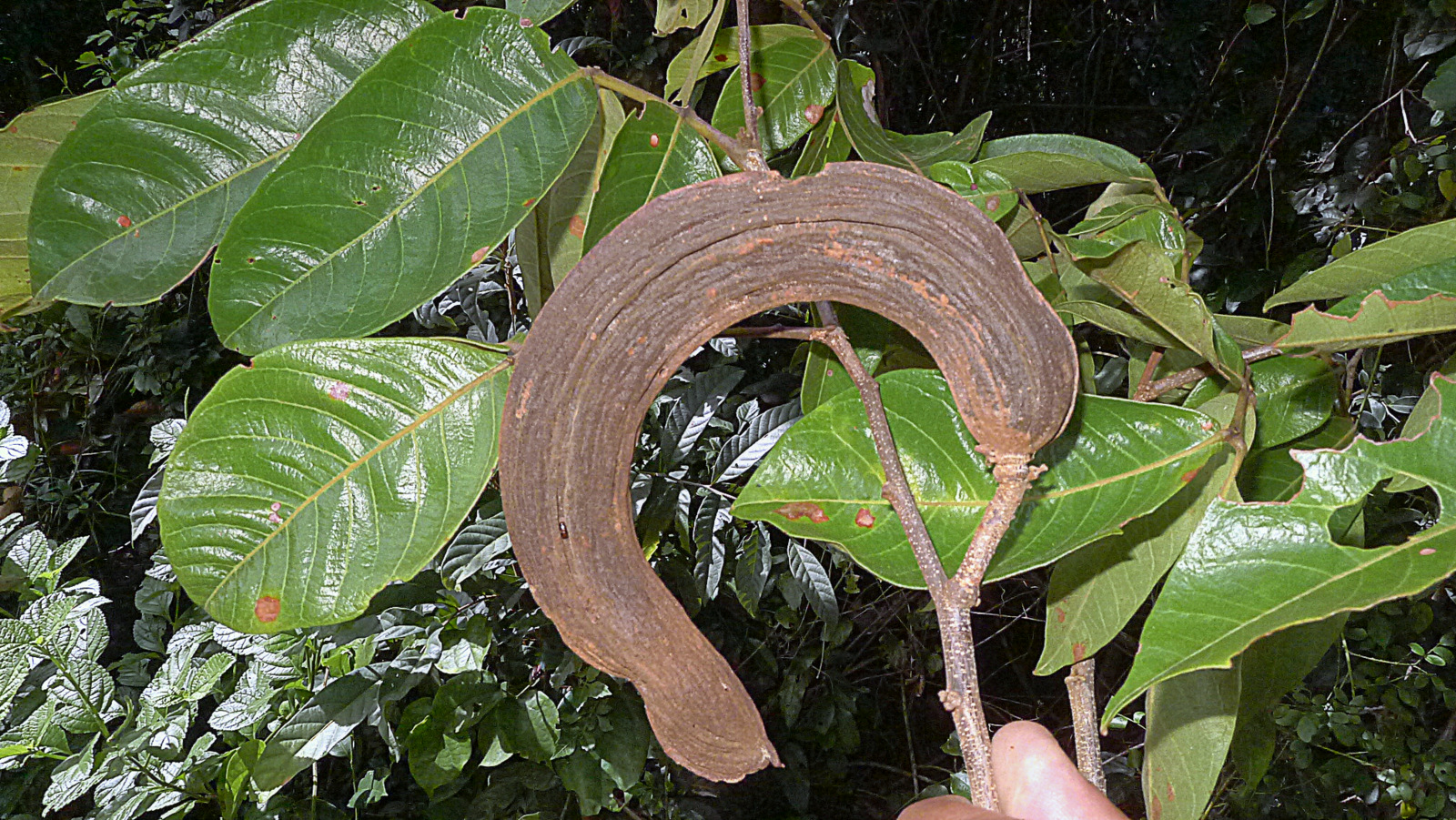

Scientific classification
- Kingdom: Plantae
- Clade: Tracheophytes
- Clade: Angiosperms
- Clade: Eudicots
- Clade: Rosids
- Order: Fabales
- Family: Fabaceae
- Subfamily: Caesalpinioideae
- Clade: Mimosoid clade
- Genus: Inga
- Species: I. subnuda

Binomial name
- Inga subnuda Salzm. ex Benth

= Inga subnuda =

Species of legume

Inga subnuda is a species of plant in the family Fabaceae. It is found in Brazil and Venezuela.
