= Inga sinacae =

Conservation status
- Endangered (IUCN 3.1)

Scientific classification
- Kingdom: Plantae
- Clade: Tracheophytes
- Clade: Angiosperms
- Clade: Eudicots
- Clade: Rosids
- Order: Fabales
- Family: Fabaceae
- Subfamily: Caesalpinioideae
- Clade: Mimosoid clade
- Genus: Inga
- Species: I. sinacae

Binomial name
- Inga sinacae M.Sousa & Ibarra-Manr.

Species of legume

Inga sinacae is a species of flowering plant in the family Fabaceae. It is a tree endemic to southern Mexico, including Oaxaca and Veracruz. It can grow 6 to 15 meters tall with a trunk 15 to 35 cm in diameter. It grows in evergreen lowland rain forests from 150 to 360 meters elevation.
