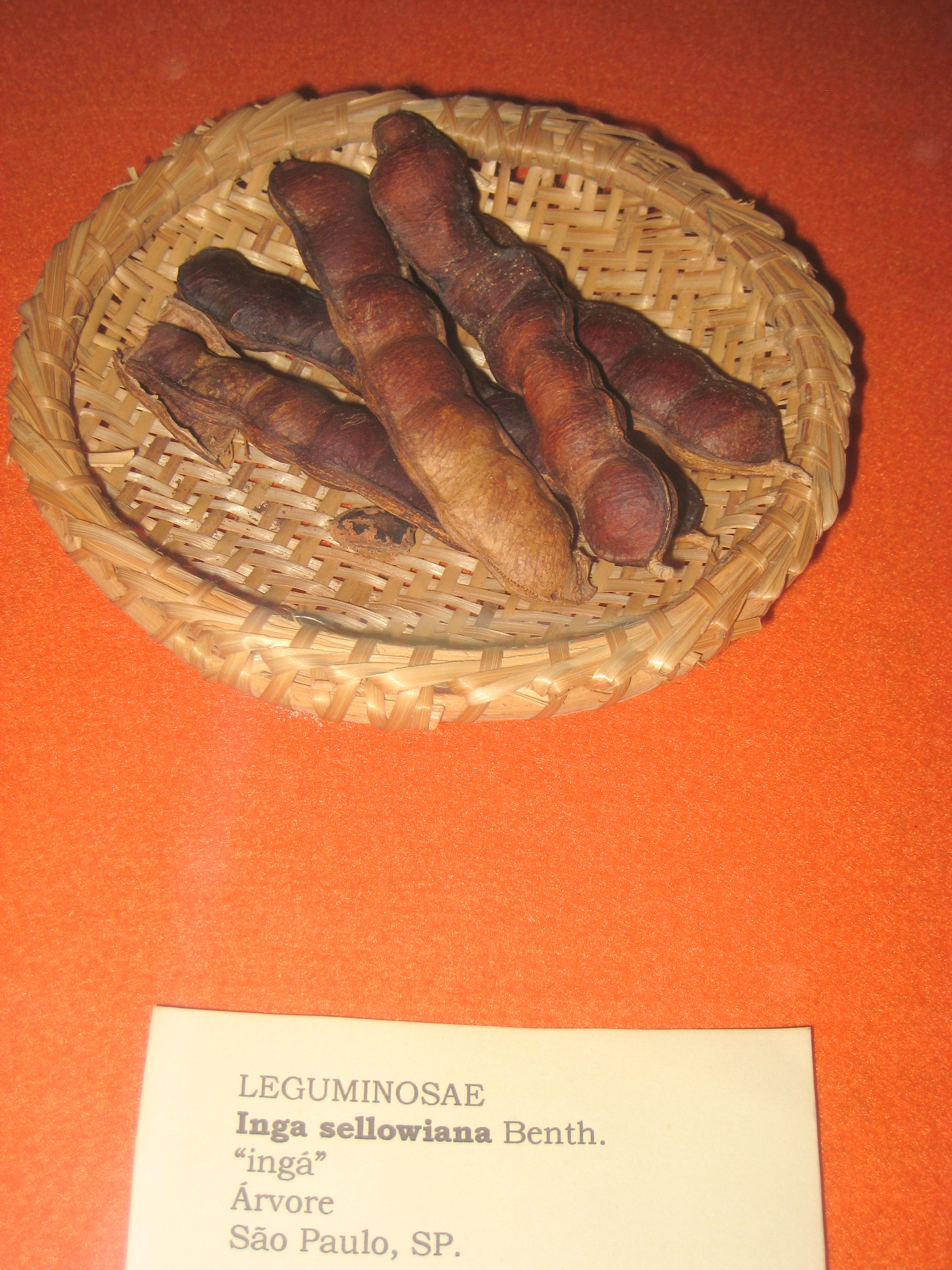

Conservation status
- Least Concern (IUCN 3.1)

Scientific classification
- Kingdom: Plantae
- Clade: Tracheophytes
- Clade: Angiosperms
- Clade: Eudicots
- Clade: Rosids
- Order: Fabales
- Family: Fabaceae
- Subfamily: Caesalpinioideae
- Clade: Mimosoid clade
- Genus: Inga
- Species: I. sellowiana

Binomial name
- Inga sellowiana Benth.

Synonyms
- Feuilleea sellowiana (Benth.) Kuntze

= Inga sellowiana =

Species of legume

Inga sellowiana is a species of legume in the family Fabaceae, endemic to Brazil. It is an evergreen, perennial shrub or small tree, 1–8 metres (3.3–26.2 ft) in height. Common names include ingá mirim, ingá ferro, ingá xixica and ingá xixi.

It is found only in Brazil, specifically in the Southeast (São Paulo, Rio de Janeiro) and South (Paraná, Santa Catarina) Regions. It has pentamerous white flowers which bloom from November through March, and from May through June.

== Etymology ==
The genus' name Inga originates from the Tupi word in-gá meaning "soaked". The species was named after Friedrich Sellow, a major collector of Brazilian flora.
