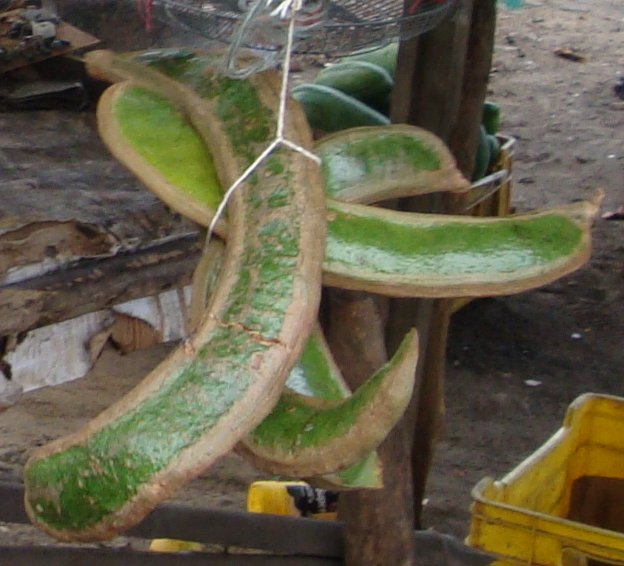

Scientific classification
- Kingdom: Plantae
- Clade: Tracheophytes
- Clade: Angiosperms
- Clade: Eudicots
- Clade: Rosids
- Order: Fabales
- Family: Fabaceae
- Subfamily: Caesalpinioideae
- Clade: Mimosoid clade
- Genus: Inga
- Species: I. spectabilis

Binomial name
- Inga spectabilis (Vahl) Willd.

= Inga spectabilis =

Species of legume

Inga spectabilis is a species of plant in the family Fabaceae.

It is native to Central America and the Andean states to Bolivia. The blade-like morphology of the fruiting pod has earned it the common name machete ice-cream-bean (Guamo Macheto, Guaba Machete).
