= Inga cordistipula =

Conservation status
- Vulnerable (IUCN 3.1)

Scientific classification
- Kingdom: Plantae
- Clade: Tracheophytes
- Clade: Angiosperms
- Clade: Eudicots
- Clade: Rosids
- Order: Fabales
- Family: Fabaceae
- Subfamily: Caesalpinioideae
- Clade: Mimosoid clade
- Genus: Inga
- Species: I. cordistipula

Binomial name
- Inga cordistipula Mart.

Species of tree

Inga cordistipula is a species of tree in the family Fabaceae. It was described by German botanist Carl Friedrich Philipp von Martius. It can be found in Colombia and Brazil.
