= Inga lomatophylla =

Scientific classification
- Kingdom: Plantae
- Clade: Tracheophytes
- Clade: Angiosperms
- Clade: Eudicots
- Clade: Rosids
- Order: Fabales
- Family: Fabaceae
- Subfamily: Caesalpinioideae
- Clade: Mimosoid clade
- Genus: Inga
- Species: I. lomatophylla

Binomial name
- Inga lomatophylla Cárdenas

Species of plant

Inga lomatophylla is a species of tree in the family Fabaceae. It can be found in Brazil, Colombia, Guyana and Venezuela. It was described by Lourdes Cárdenas.
