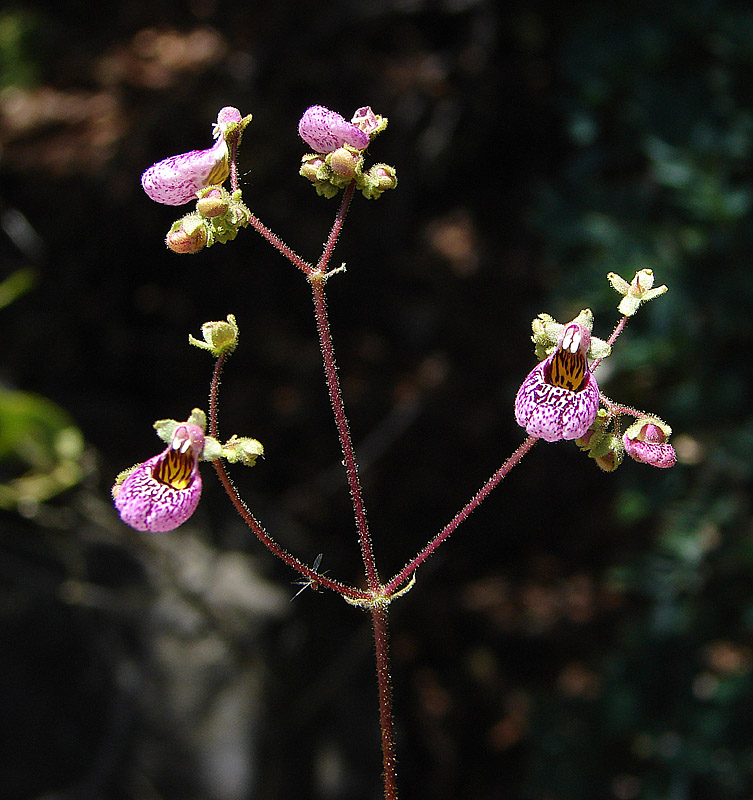
- Flowers

Scientific classification
- Kingdom: Plantae
- Clade: Embryophytes
- Clade: Tracheophytes
- Clade: Spermatophytes
- Clade: Angiosperms
- Clade: Eudicots
- Clade: Asterids
- Order: Lamiales
- Family: Calceolariaceae
- Genus: Calceolaria
- Species: C. cana

Binomial name
- Calceolaria cana Cav.

Synonyms
- Fagelia cana (Cav.) Kuntze

= Calceolaria cana =

Species of flowering plant

Calceolaria cana, the salsilla or zarcilla, is a species of flowering plant in the pocketbook plant genus Calceolaria, family Calceolariaceae, native to central Chile. Along with Calceolaria corymbosa and Calceolaria crenatiflora it has contributed to the Calceolaria Herbeohybrida Group of cultivars.
