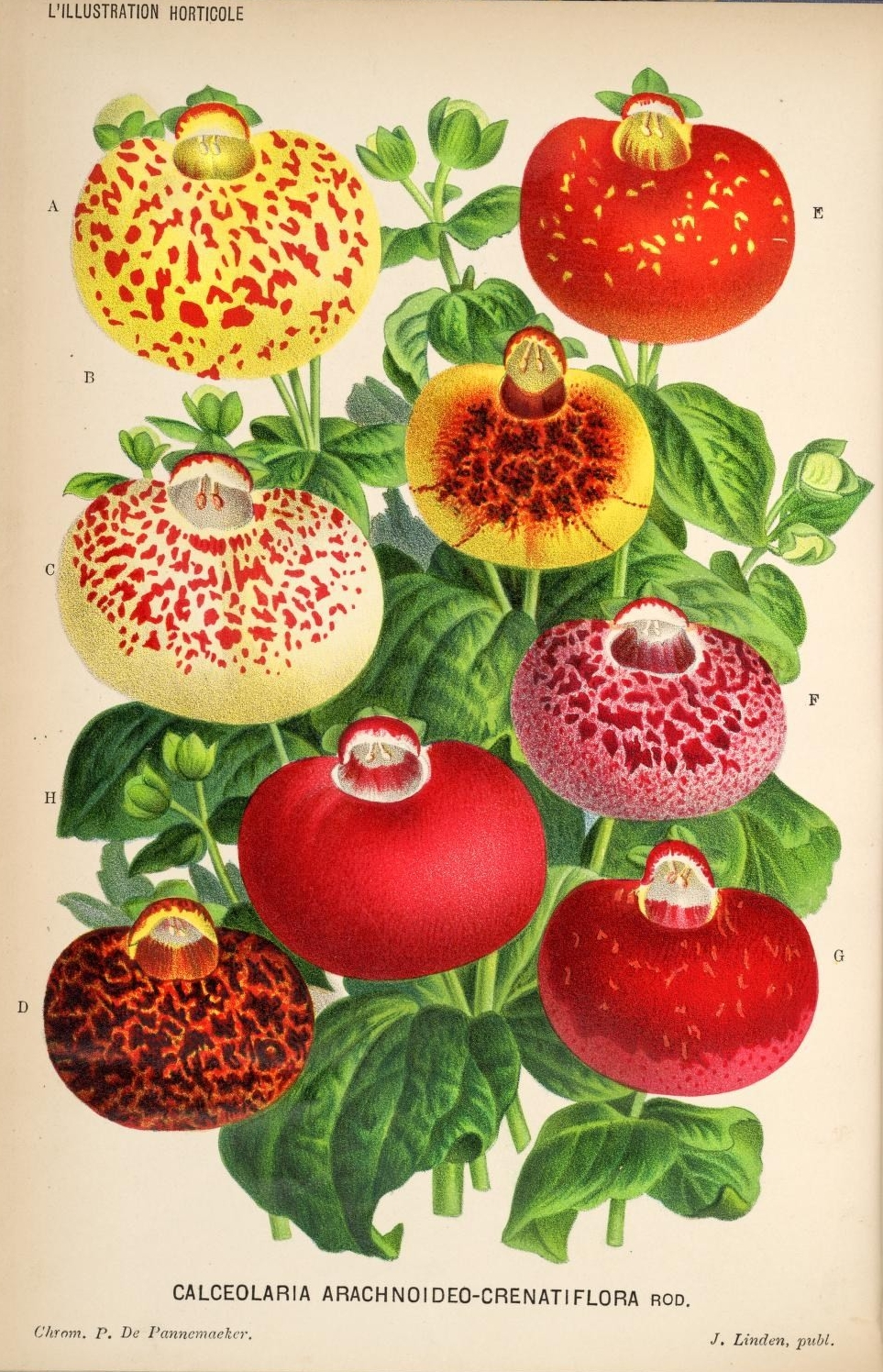
- Botanical illustration

Scientific classification
- Kingdom: Plantae
- Clade: Tracheophytes
- Clade: Angiosperms
- Clade: Eudicots
- Clade: Asterids
- Order: Lamiales
- Family: Calceolariaceae
- Genus: Calceolaria
- Species: C. crenatiflora

Binomial name
- Calceolaria crenatiflora Cav.

Synonyms
- List: Calceolaria anomala Pers.; Calceolaria cunninghamii Vatke; Calceolaria hollermayeri Kraenzl.; Calceolaria knypersliensis Steud.; Calceolaria mirabilis Knowles & Westc.; Calceolaria pendula Sweet; Fagelia crenatiflora (Cav.) Kuntze

= Calceolaria crenatiflora =

Species of flowering plant

Calceolaria crenatiflora is a species of flowering plant in the pocketbook plant genus Calceolaria, family Calceolariaceae. It is native to central and southern Chile and southern Argentina. It has gained the Royal Horticultural Society's Award of Garden Merit as a warm temperate greenhouse ornamental. Along with Calceolaria corymbosa and Calceolaria cana it has contributed to the Calceolaria Herbeohybrida Group of cultivars.
