= C. commutata =

C. commutata may refer to:

- Calceolaria commutata, a plant endemic to Ecuador
- Canna commutata, a garden plant
- Convallaria commutata, a North American plant
- Costellaria commutata, a sea snail
