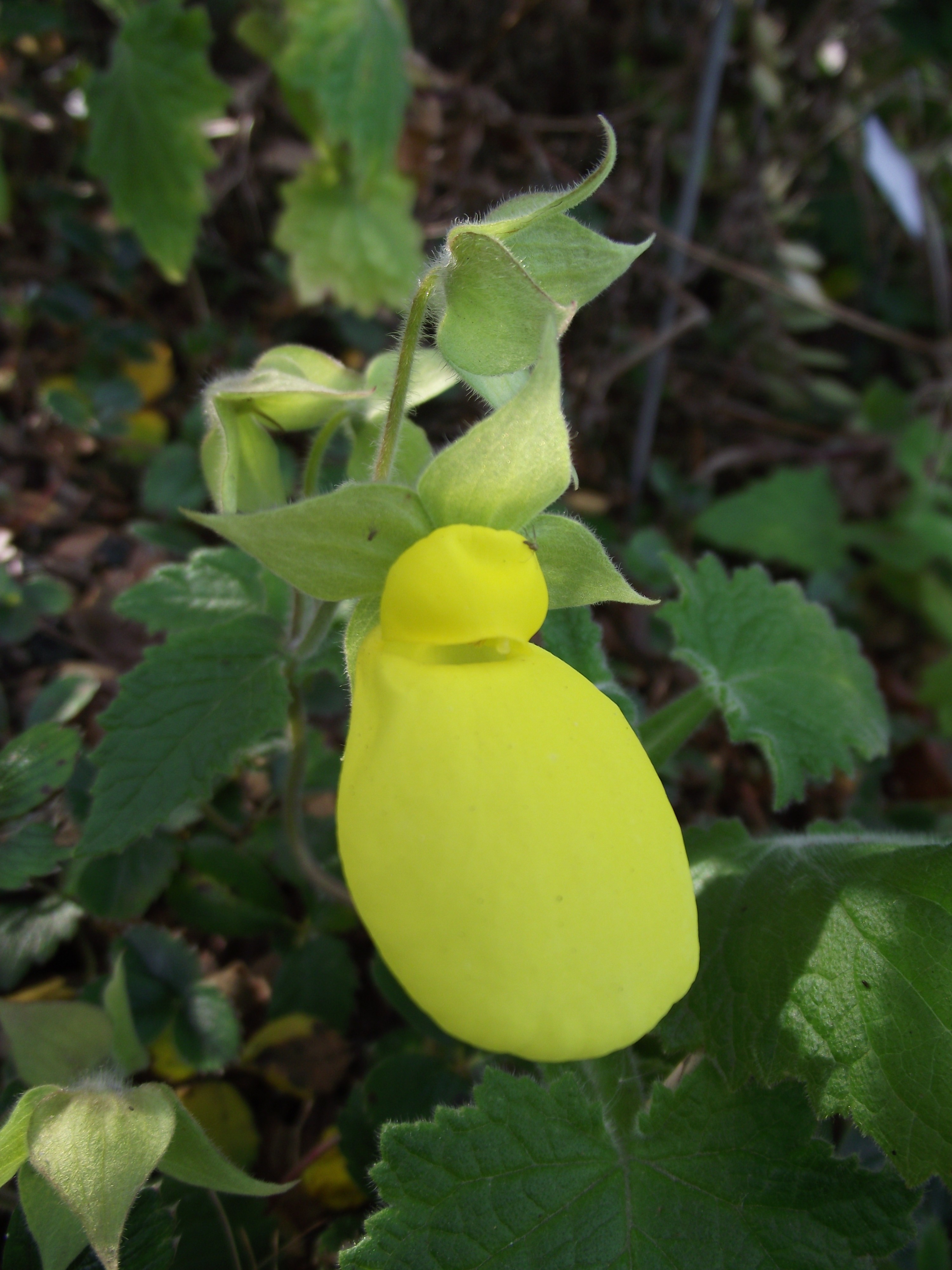

Scientific classification
- Kingdom: Plantae
- Clade: Tracheophytes
- Clade: Angiosperms
- Clade: Eudicots
- Clade: Asterids
- Order: Lamiales
- Family: Calceolariaceae
- Genus: Calceolaria
- Species: C. tomentosa

Binomial name
- Calceolaria tomentosa Ruiz & Pav.

Synonyms
- Fagelia tomentosa (Ruiz & Pav.) Kuntze

= Calceolaria tomentosa =

Species of plant

Calceolaria tomentosa is a perennial plant belonging to the family Calceolariaceae. It is native to Peru.

Calceolaria tomentosa can reach a height of about 1 meter (3 feet). It has soft, wide cordate leaves and a soft stem. The flowers are yellow.
