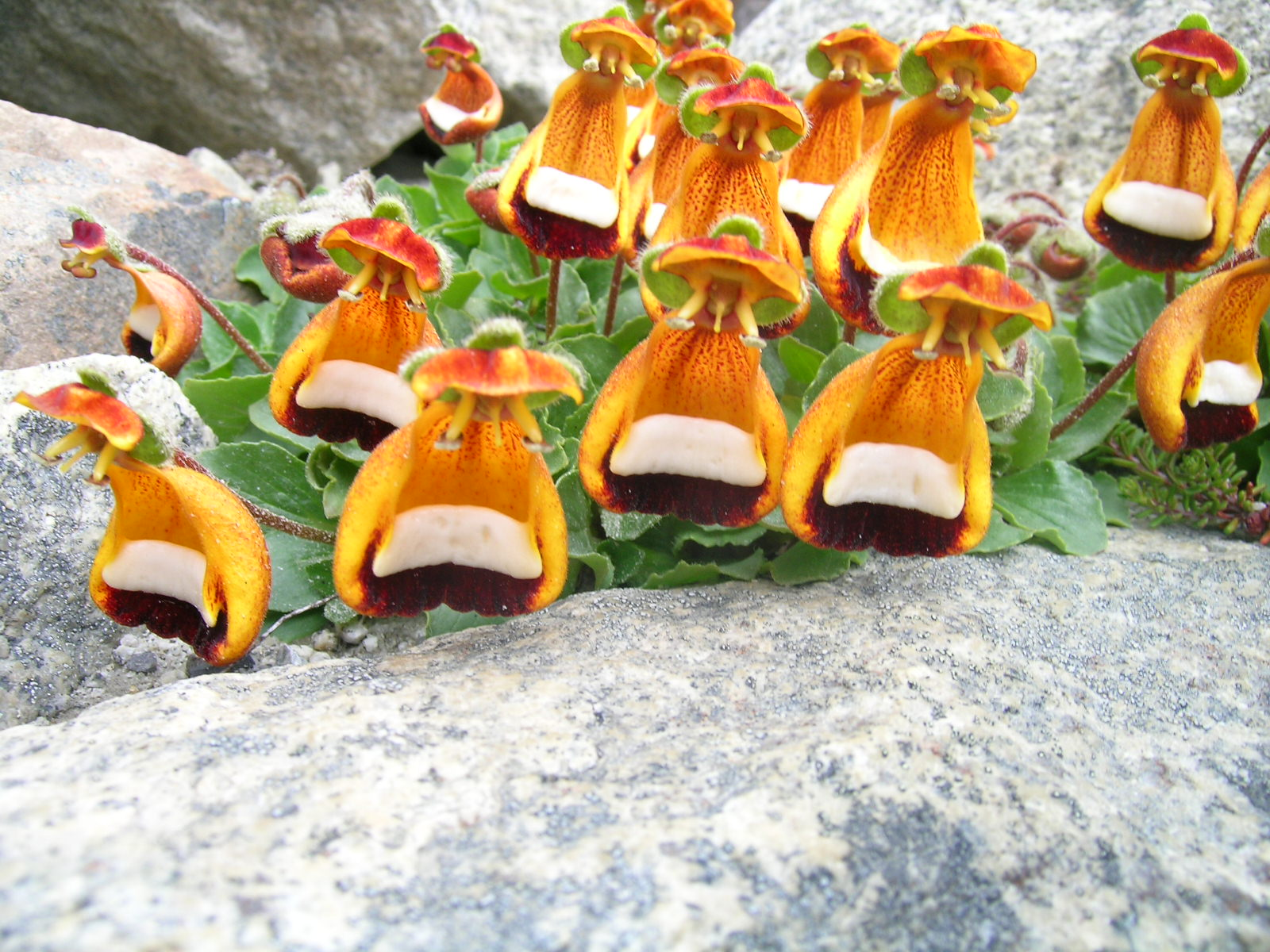

Scientific classification
- Kingdom: Plantae
- Clade: Tracheophytes
- Clade: Angiosperms
- Clade: Eudicots
- Clade: Asterids
- Order: Lamiales
- Family: Calceolariaceae
- Genus: Calceolaria
- Species: C. uniflora

Binomial name
- Calceolaria uniflora Lam.

Synonyms
- Calceolaria nana Sm.; Calceolaria monanthos Poir.; Calceolaria darwinii Benth.; Fagelia darwinii (Benth.) Kuntze; Fagelia nana (Sm.) Kuntze; Fagelia uniflora (Lam.) Kuntze; Calceolaria minima Witasek; Calceolaria uniflora var. darwinii (Benth.) Witasek ex Reiche; Calceolaria uniflora var. minima (Witasek) Reiche; Calceolaria uniflora var. silvestris Skottsb.

= Calceolaria uniflora =

Darwin's slipper

Species of flowering plant

Calceolaria uniflora (syn. Calceolaria darwinii, known as Darwin's slipper) is a perennial plant of the genus Calceolaria, known as the slipperworts. It is originally from Tierra del Fuego in the southern part of South America.

Calceolaria uniflora is a mountain plant growing only to 10 cm (4 in) tall. The flowers are a compound of yellow, white and brownish red.

Calceolaria uniflora is an ornithophilic plant and is pollinated by the least seedsnipe. The seedsnipe eats the conspicuous white floral appendage on the lower lip of the flower, which is high in sugars. While the seedsnipe pecks at this appendage, the stigma and anthers of the flower tap the head and back of the seedsnipe distributing and receiving pollen, ensuring that pollen will be transferred to the next Calceolaria unifora that is visited by the seedsnipe.

== Gallery ==
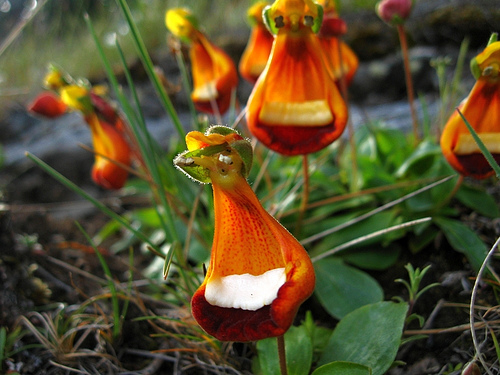

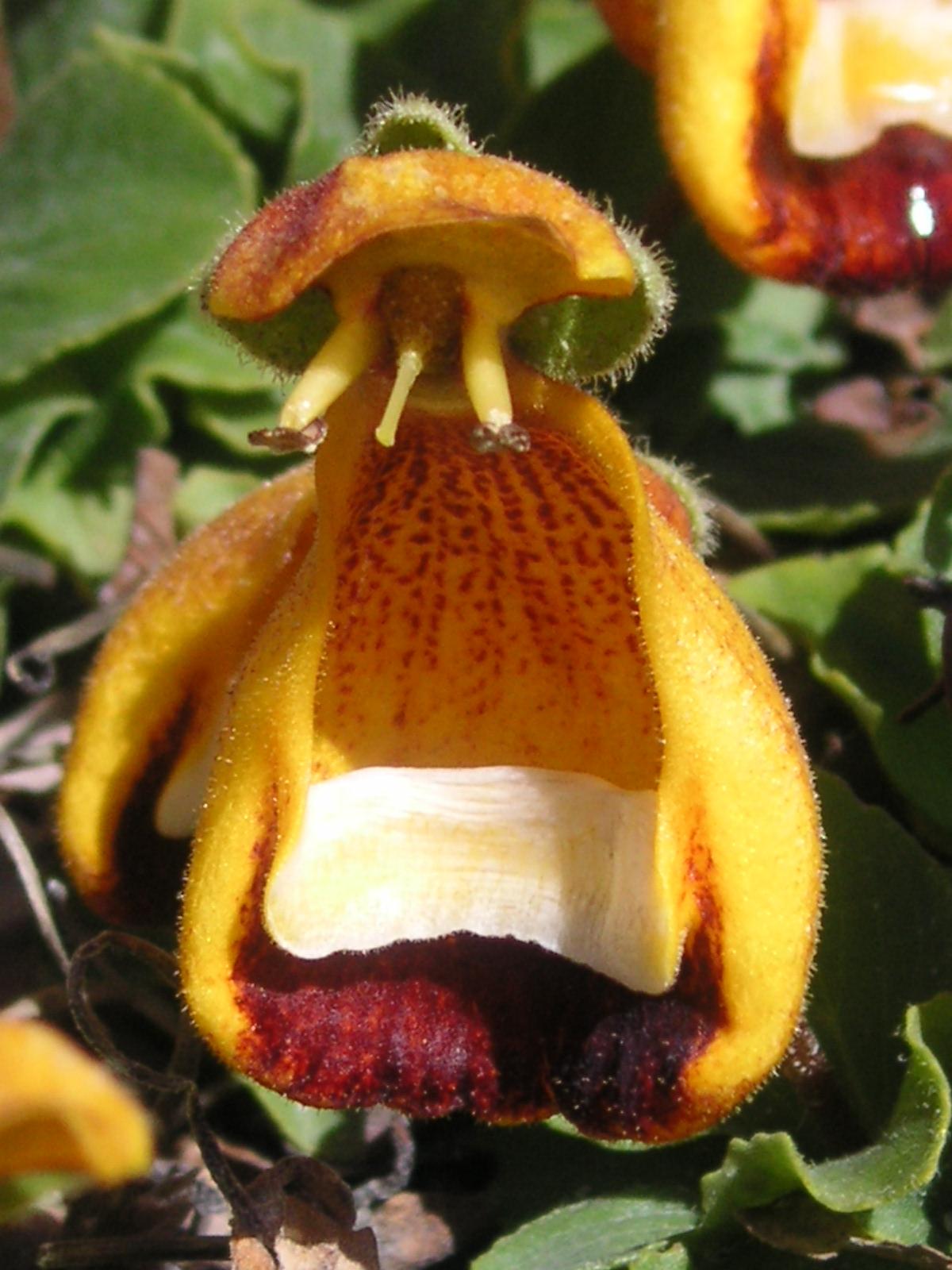

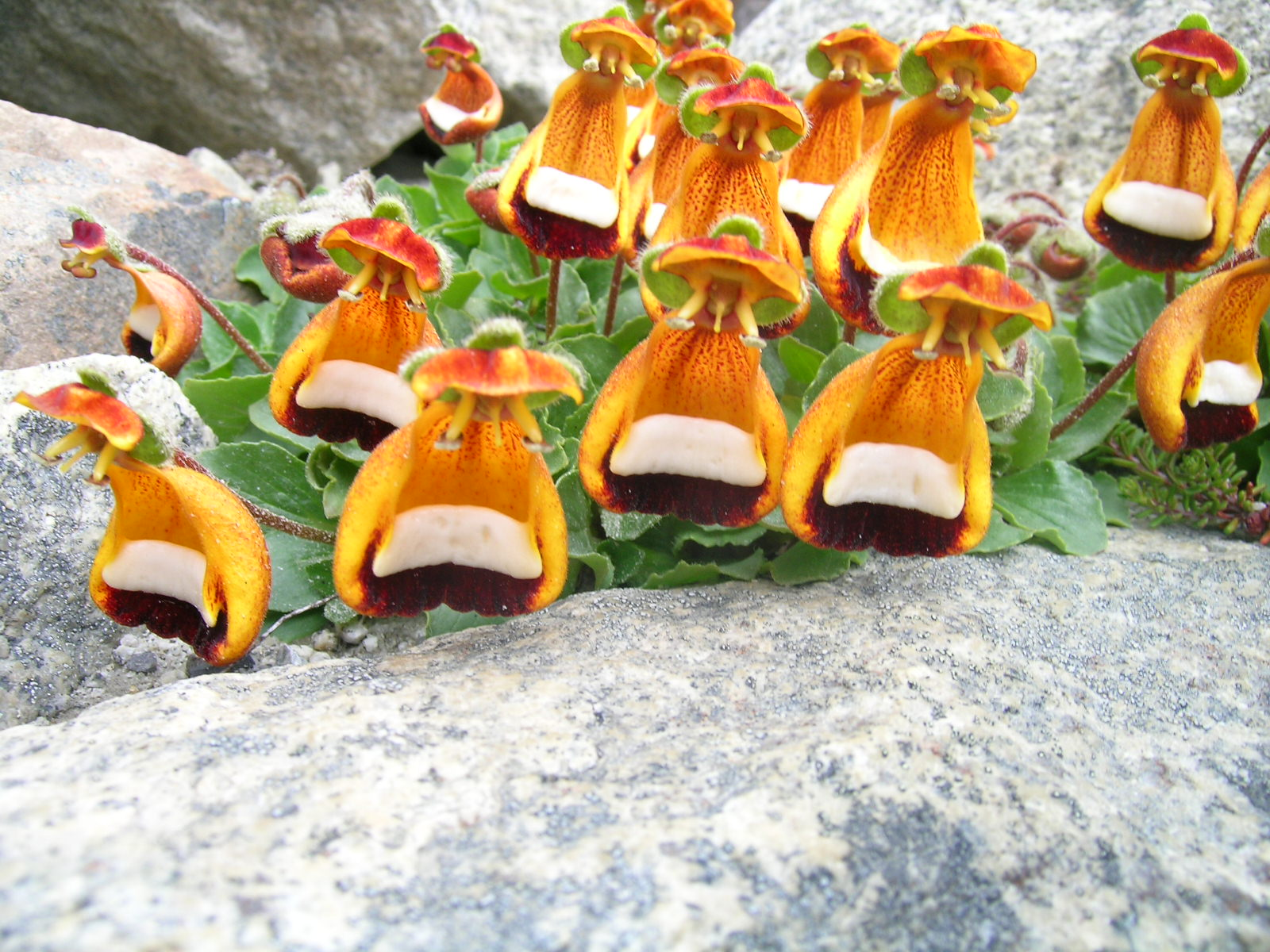

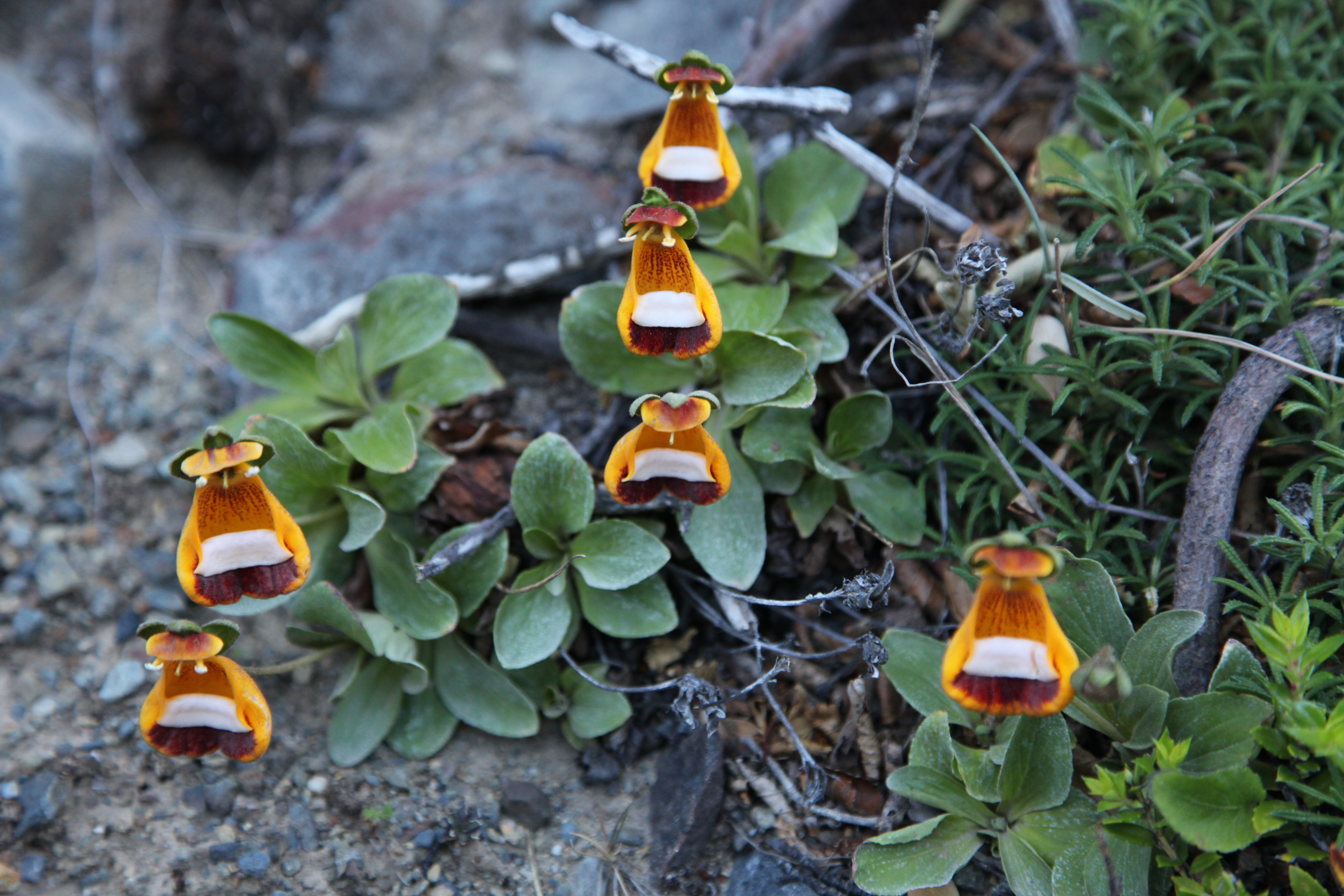

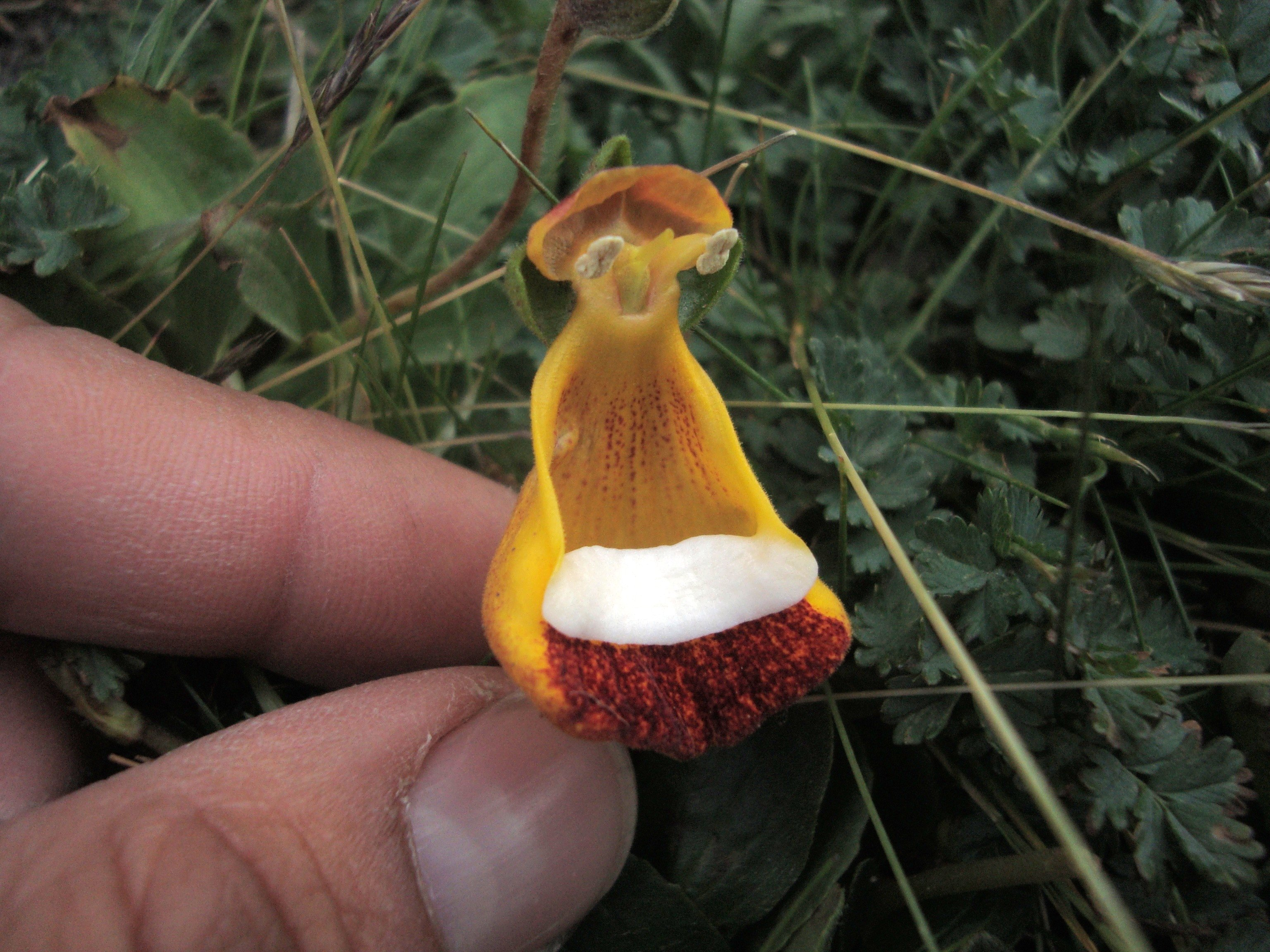

== Bibliography ==
- Sheader, Martin & Sheader, Anna-Liisa (2015). "Patagonian alpines". The Plantsman. New Series. 14 (1): 16–21.
- Sérsic, A. N.; Cocucci, A. A. (1996). "A Remarkable Case of Ornithophily in Calceolaria : Food Bodies as Rewards for a Non-nectarivorous Bird*". Botanica Acta. 109 (2): 172–176. doi:10.1111/j.1438-8677.1996.tb00558.x.
- Candeias, Matt. (2021). In Defense of Plants. Mango. 88–89.
