= Calceolaria serrata =

Conservation status
- Vulnerable (IUCN 3.1)

Scientific classification
- Kingdom: Plantae
- Clade: Tracheophytes
- Clade: Angiosperms
- Clade: Eudicots
- Clade: Asterids
- Order: Lamiales
- Family: Calceolariaceae
- Genus: Calceolaria
- Species: C. serrata

Binomial name
- Calceolaria serrata Lam.

Species of flowering plant

Calceolaria serrata is a species of plant in the Calceolariaceae family. It is endemic to Ecuador.
