= Calceolaria crenata =

Scientific classification
- Kingdom: Plantae
- Clade: Tracheophytes
- Clade: Angiosperms
- Clade: Eudicots
- Clade: Asterids
- Order: Lamiales
- Family: Calceolariaceae
- Genus: Calceolaria
- Species: C. crenata

Binomial name
- Calceolaria crenata Lam.

Synonyms
- Calceolaria amplexicaulis Kunth; Calceolaria fallax Kraenzl.; Calceolaria floribunda Kunth; Calceolaria floribunda Hook. (nom. illeg.); Calceolaria paniculata Willd. ex Link (nom. inval.); Fagelia amplexicaulis (Kunth) Kuntze; Fagelia crenata (Lam.) Kuntze

Species of plant

Calceolaria crenata is a perennial plant belonging to family Calceolariaceae and native to the Peruvian Andes and the Ecuadorian Andes. The genus Calceolaria has been recently segregated from other members of the Scrophulariaceae, along with Porodittia, and Jovellana into its own family.

Calceolaria crenata can grow to 1 metre (3 ft 3 in) high, with a branching habit, and has soft cordate leaves. Calceolaria crenata flowers from spring to summer in its native habitat, with clusters of small (12 millimetres or 0.5 inches in diameter) yellow flowers.
