= Calceolaria hyssopifolia =

Conservation status
- Least Concern (IUCN 3.1)

Scientific classification
- Kingdom: Plantae
- Clade: Tracheophytes
- Clade: Angiosperms
- Clade: Eudicots
- Clade: Asterids
- Order: Lamiales
- Family: Calceolariaceae
- Genus: Calceolaria
- Species: C. hyssopifolia

Binomial name
- Calceolaria hyssopifolia Kunth

Species of flowering plant

Calceolaria hyssopifolia is a species of plant in the Calceolariaceae family. It is endemic to Ecuador.

The Latin word hyssopifolia (which also occurs in several other plant names, including that of cuphea hyssopifolia) means "hyssop-leafed".
