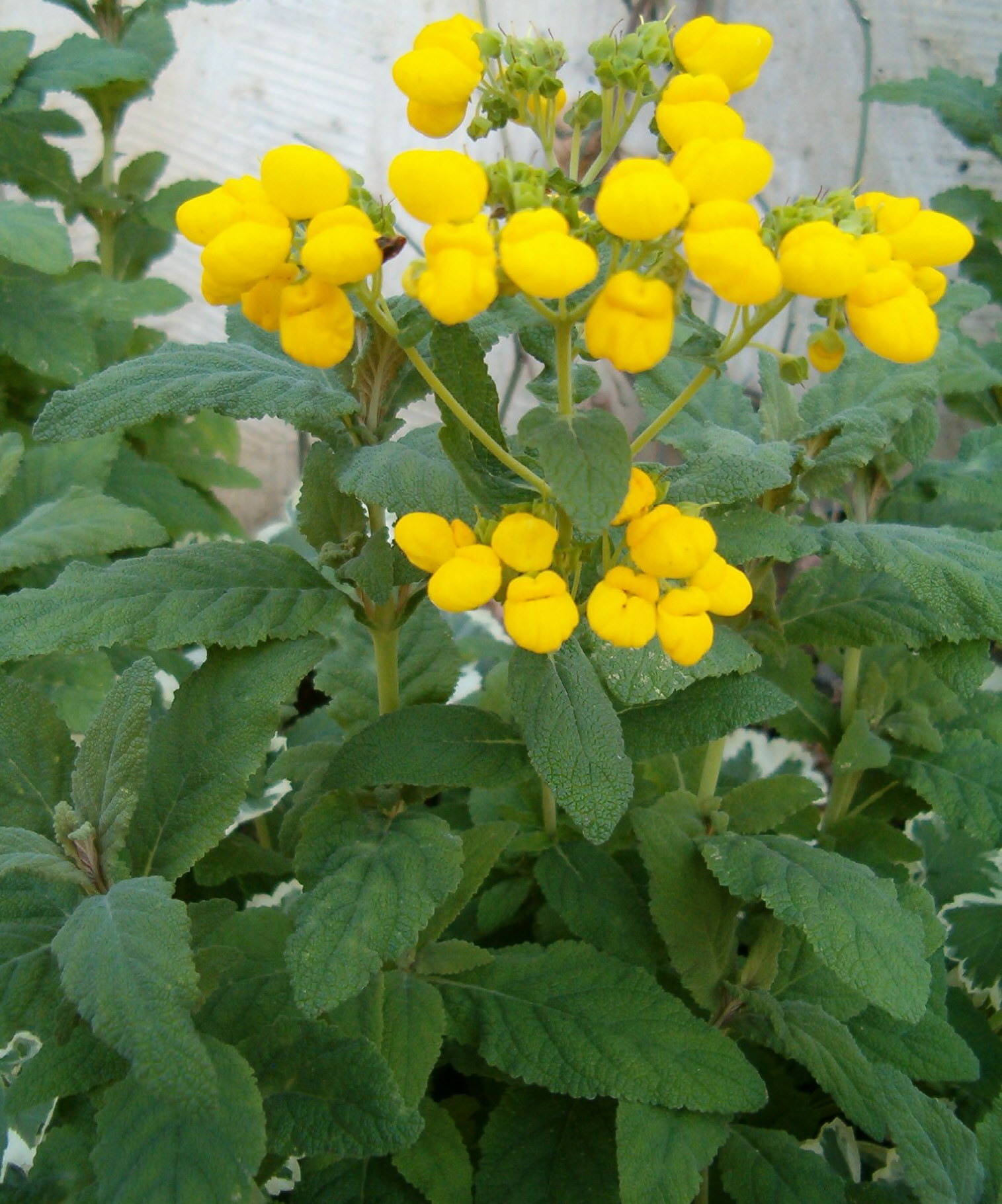

Scientific classification
- Kingdom: Plantae
- Clade: Tracheophytes
- Clade: Angiosperms
- Clade: Eudicots
- Clade: Asterids
- Order: Lamiales
- Family: Calceolariaceae
- Genus: Calceolaria
- Species: C. integrifolia

Binomial name
- Calceolaria integrifolia Murray

= Calceolaria integrifolia =

Species of flowering plant

Calceolaria integrifolia, the bush slipperwort, is a species of flowering plant belonging to the genus Calceolaria and native to Argentina and Chile.

This evergreen subshrub grows to 1.8 meters (6 feet) tall. Its leaves are highly veined, slightly sticky, and have a puckered texture. The flowers appear in clusters throughout the spring and summer. They are lemon yellow in colour, and resemble antirrhinums (snapdragons) in shape.

In cultivation in the UK, it has gained the Royal Horticultural Society's Award of Garden Merit. It requires a sheltered, frost-free position in sun or partial shade.

A striking cultivar is 'Kentish Hero', with large red flowers which turn orange.
