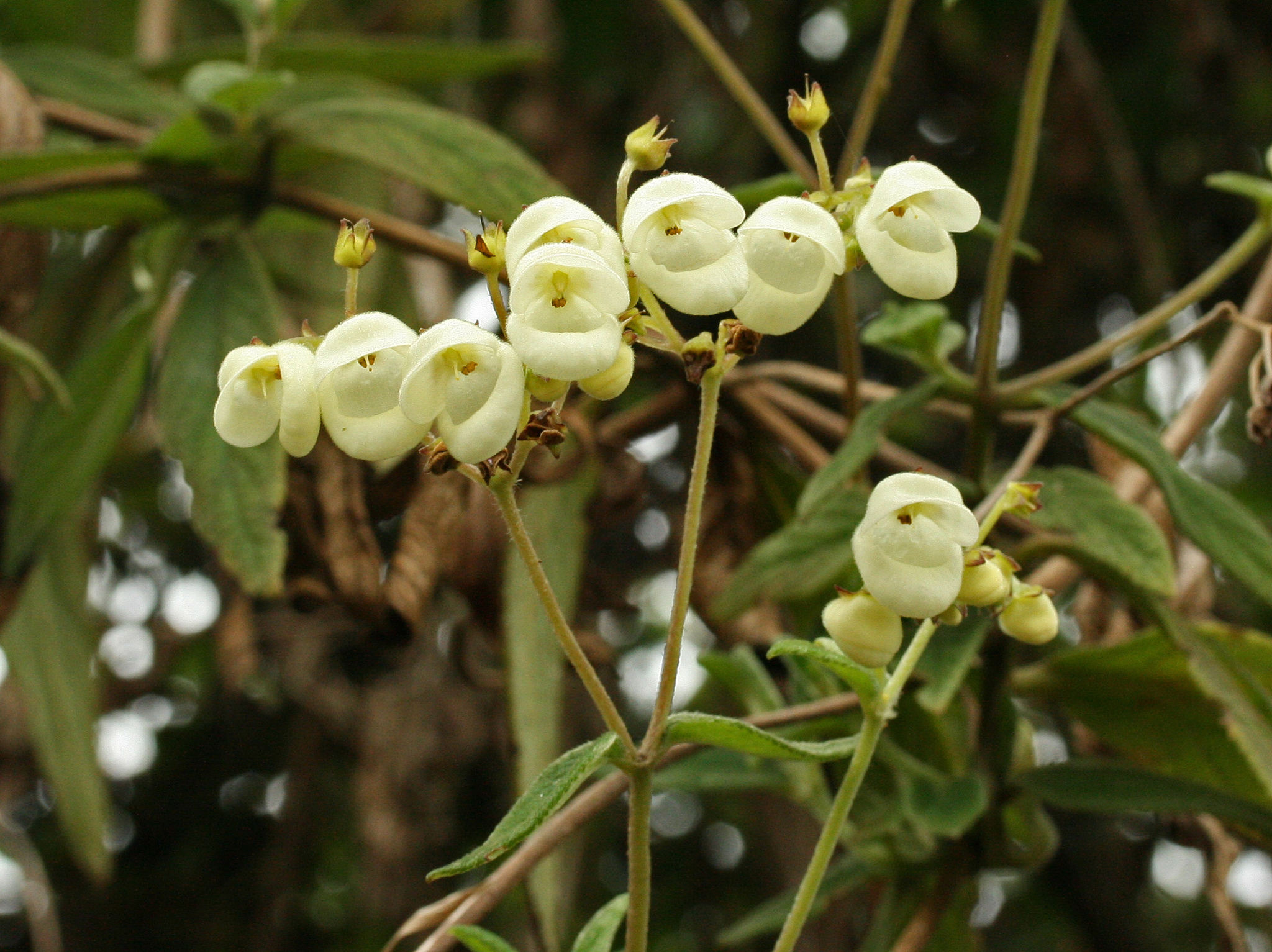
- Calceolaria martinezii in Ecuador

Conservation status
- Endangered (IUCN 3.1)

Scientific classification
- Kingdom: Plantae
- Clade: Tracheophytes
- Clade: Angiosperms
- Clade: Eudicots
- Clade: Asterids
- Order: Lamiales
- Family: Calceolariaceae
- Genus: Calceolaria
- Species: C. martinezii

Binomial name
- Calceolaria martinezii Kraenzl.

= Calceolaria martinezii =

Species of flowering plant

Calceolaria martinezii is a species of plant in the Calceolariaceae family. It is endemic to the Ambato plateau in central Ecuador, where it is known from only two subpopulations: one on the slopes of the Tungurahua volcano, and another close to the town of Patate.
