= Calceolaria obtusa =

Conservation status
- Endangered (IUCN 3.1)

Scientific classification
- Kingdom: Plantae
- Clade: Tracheophytes
- Clade: Angiosperms
- Clade: Eudicots
- Clade: Asterids
- Order: Lamiales
- Family: Calceolariaceae
- Genus: Calceolaria
- Species: C. obtusa

Binomial name
- Calceolaria obtusa Molau

Species of flowering plant

Calceolaria obtusa is an endangered species of plant in the Calceolariaceae family. It is a subshrub or shrub endemic to southern Ecuador.

The main obstacle for gene flow of this genre is ecogeographic isolation. originated from the southern Andes mountains located in Chile. This flowering plant is also one of the largest oil-producing plants.
