= Calceolaria Herbeohybrida Group =

Cultivar group of hybrids in the genus Calceolaria

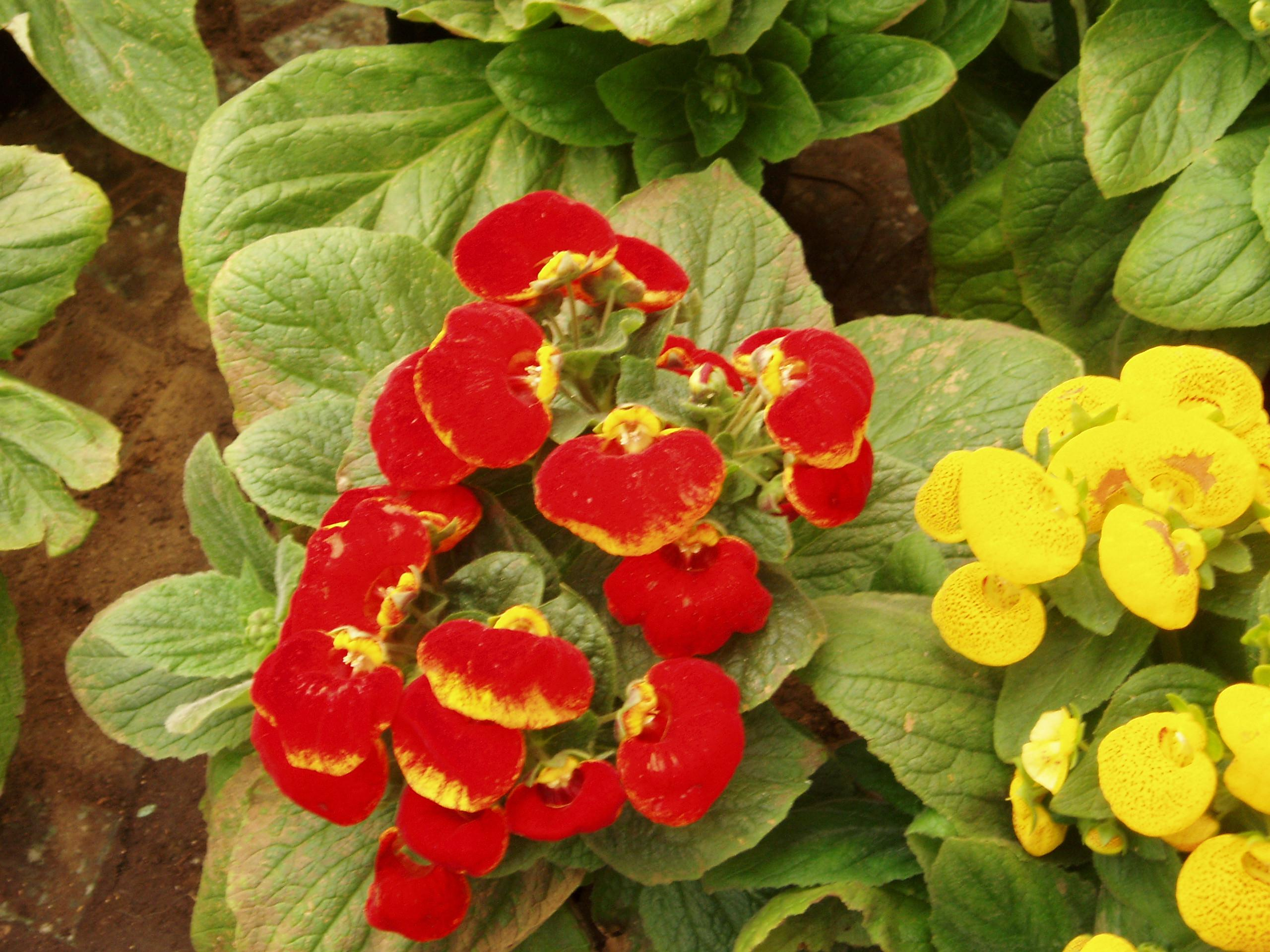
- Genus: Calceolaria
- Hybrid parentage: Interspecific hybrid in the genus Calceolaria involving C. crenatiflora, C. corymbosa and C. cana
- Cultivar group: Herbeohybrida Group
- Cultivar group members: Many; see text.

Calceolaria Herbeohybrida Group, also called Calceolaria ×herbeohybrida Voss, is a cultivar group of hybrids in the genus Calceolaria, derived from three species from Chile and Argentina, C. crenatiflora, C. corymbosa and C. cana.

Calceolaria Herbeohybrida Group hybrids are usually 30–45 cm (12 to 18 in) tall, sometimes smaller. They have soft stems and flowers can vary from yellow to red. There are many cultivars including 'Gold Fever' with yellow flowers, 'Jewel Cluster' early flowering with mixed colours, 'Sunset Mixed' with orange to red flowers, and 'Sunshine' with yellow flowers. Similar to a poinsettia, Calceolaria Herbeohybrida Group is sold at florist shops and kept in the house until it finishes blooming. It will rarely rebloom in the house because it needs the higher humidity of a greenhouse environment. It does not like summer heat and needs mild temperatures.
