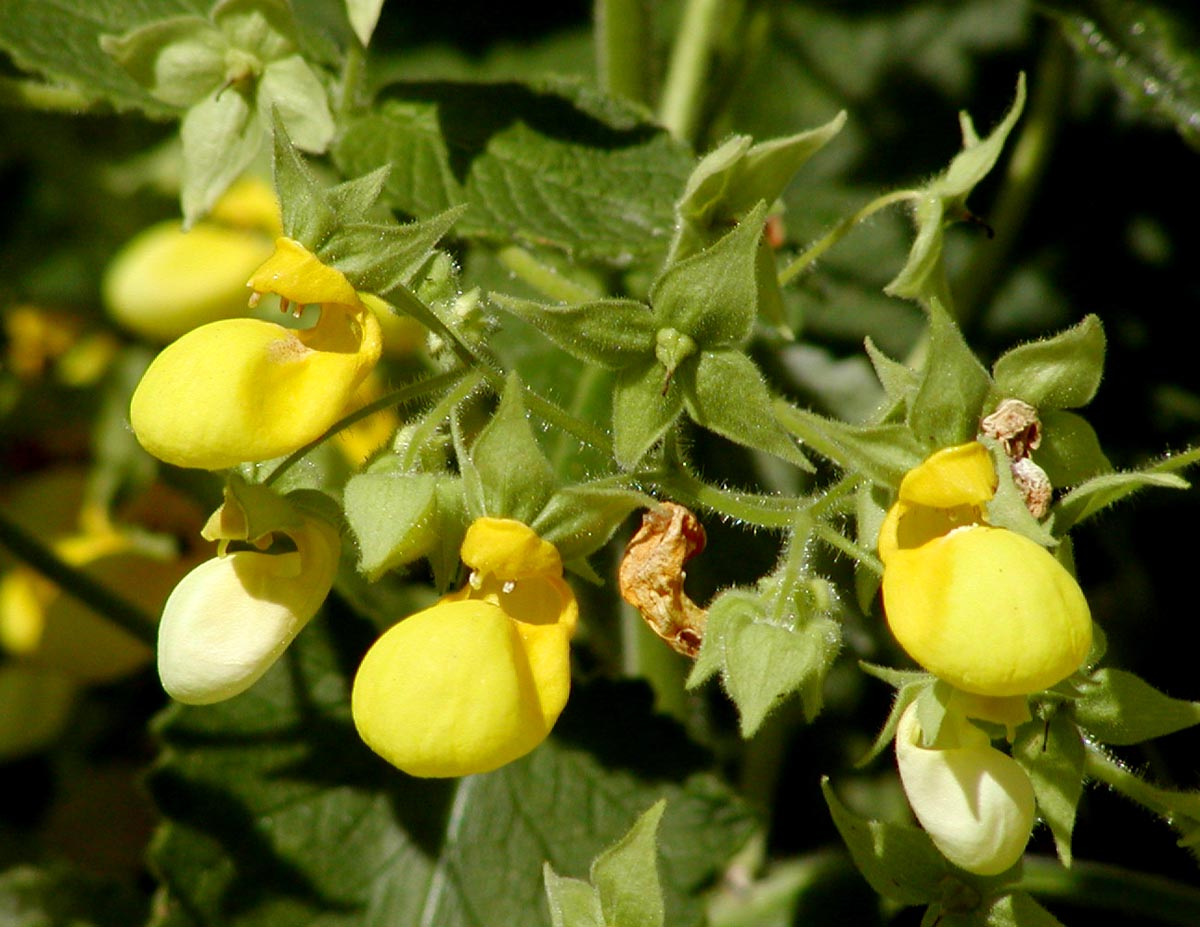
- C. dilatata

Scientific classification
- Kingdom: Plantae
- Clade: Tracheophytes
- Clade: Angiosperms
- Clade: Eudicots
- Clade: Asterids
- Order: Lamiales
- Family: Calceolariaceae
- Genus: Calceolaria; L.

Synonyms
- Fagelia Schwencke; Porodittia G.Don ex Kraenzl.; Stemotria Wettst. & Harms; Trianthera Wettst.

= Calceolaria =

Genus of flowering plants

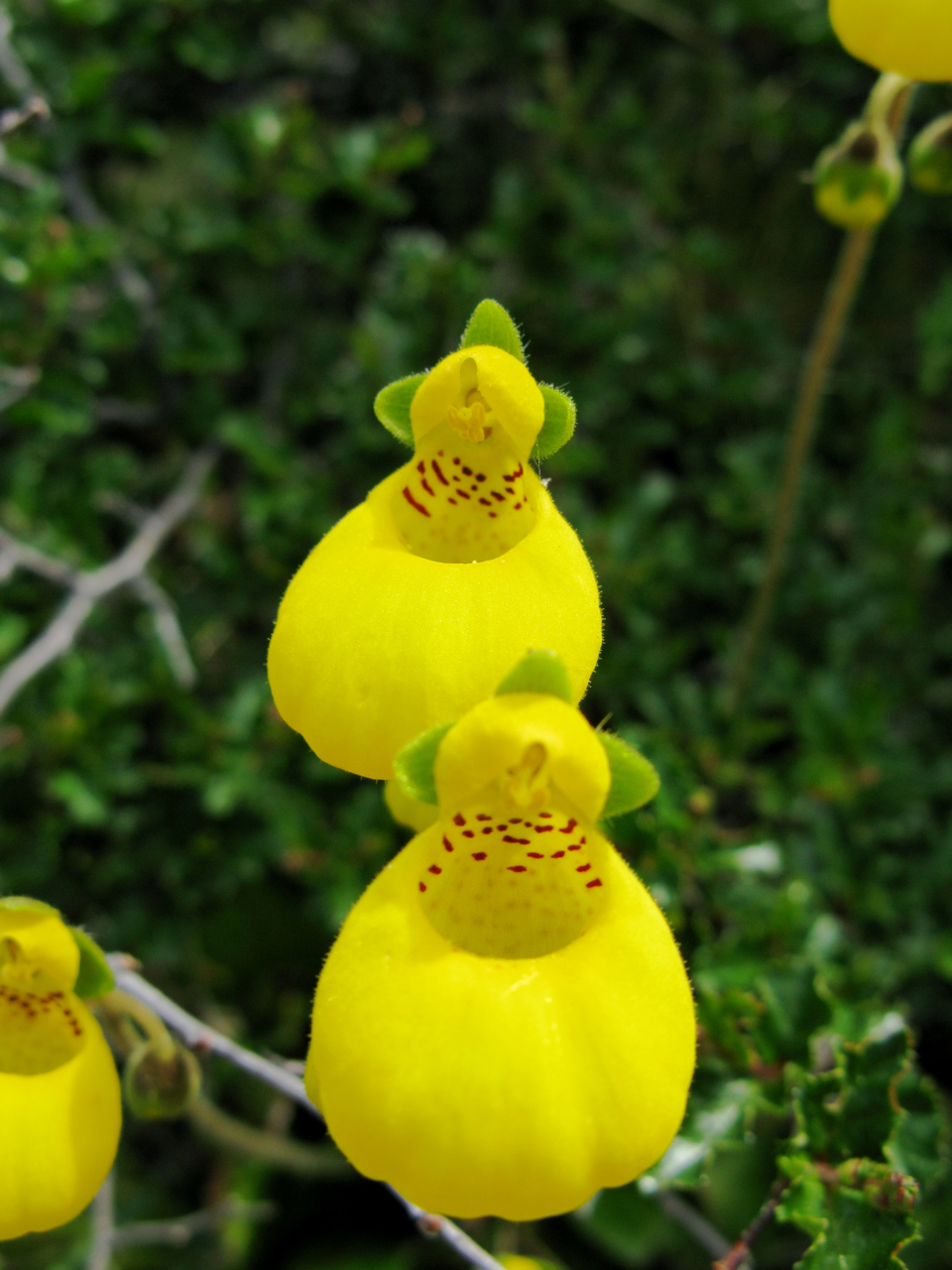
C. biflora

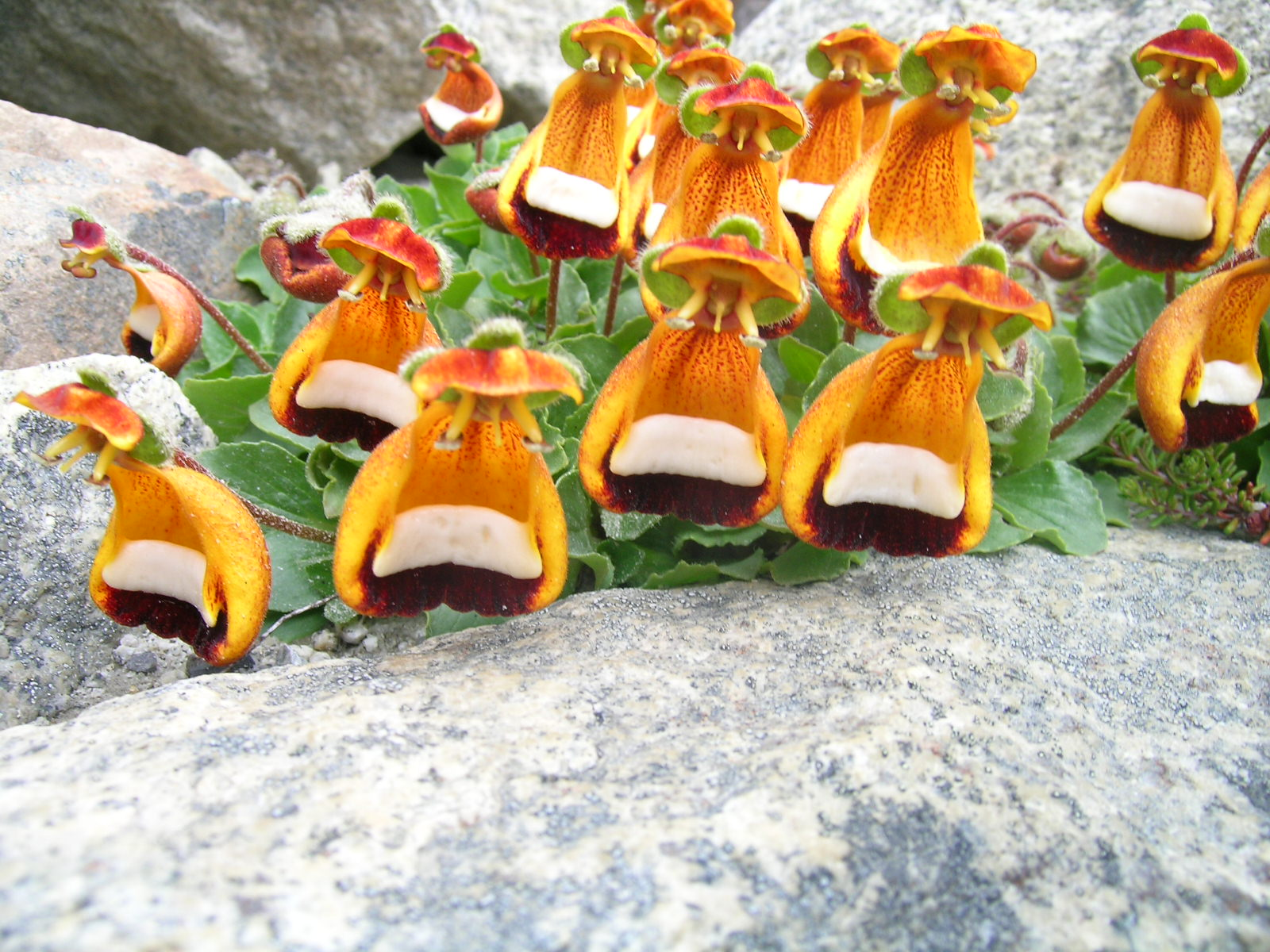
C. uniflora

Calceolaria (/ˌkælsiəˈlɛəriə/), also called lady's purse, slipper flower and pocketbook flower, or slipperwort, is a genus of plants in the family Calceolariaceae, though classified in Scrophulariaceae by some authors. This genus consists of about 269 species of shrubs, lianas and herbs, and the geographical range extends from Patagonia to central Mexico, with its distribution centre in Andean region. Calceolaria species have usually yellow or orange flowers, which can have red or purple spots. The Calceolaria Herbeohybrida group, also called C. herbeohybrida Voss, is a group of ornamental hybrids known only in cultivation, called florists' slipperwort.

== Species ==
As of October 2025, Plants of the World Online accepted 269 species.

- Calceolaria aconcaguina Phil.
- Calceolaria adenanthera Molau
- Calceolaria adenocalyx Molau
- Calceolaria aiseniana Ehrh.
- Calceolaria ajugoides Kraenzl.
- Calceolaria alata (Pennell) Pennell
- Calceolaria alba Ruiz & Pav.
- Calceolaria albotomentosa Pennell
- Calceolaria amicora S.Leiva, E.Rodr. & Rimarachin
- Calceolaria amoena Molau
- Calceolaria andina Benth.
- Calceolaria angustiflora Ruiz & Pav.
- Calceolaria angustifolia (Lindl.) Sweet
- Calceolaria anisanthera Pennell
- Calceolaria annua Edwin
- Calceolaria aperta Edwin
- Calceolaria aquatica A.Braun & C.D.Bouché
- Calceolaria arachnoidea Graham
- Calceolaria arbuscula Molau
- Calceolaria argentea Kunth
- Calceolaria ascendens Lindl.
- Calceolaria asperula Phil.
- Calceolaria atahualpae Kraenzl.
- Calceolaria auriculata Phil.
- Calceolaria australis (Molau) Molau
- Calceolaria ballotifolia Kraenzl.
- Calceolaria barbata Molau
- Calceolaria bartsiifolia Wedd.
- Calceolaria belophora Pennell
- Calceolaria bentae Molau
- Calceolaria bicolor Ruiz & Pav.
- Calceolaria bicrenata Ruiz & Pav.
- Calceolaria biflora Lam.
- Calceolaria bogotensis (Pennell) Pennell
- Calceolaria boliviana (Britton ex Rusby) Pennell
- Calceolaria borsinii Rossow
- Calceolaria brachiata Kraenzl.
- Calceolaria brunellifolia Phil.
- Calceolaria buchtieniana Kraenzl.
- Calceolaria bullata Molau
- Calceolaria caespitosa Molau
- Calceolaria cajabambae Kraenzl.
- Calceolaria caleuana Muñoz-Schick & A.Moreira
- Calceolaria calycina Benth.
- Calceolaria campanae Phil.
- Calceolaria cana Cav.
- Calceolaria cataractarum Molau
- Calceolaria cavanillesii Phil.
- Calceolaria chaetostemon Pennell
- Calceolaria chelidonioides Kunth
- Calceolaria chibulensis C.Romero, Bussmann & Puppo
- Calceolaria chrysosphaera Pennell
- Calceolaria collina Phil.
- Calceolaria colombiana Pennell
- Calceolaria colquepatana Pennell
- Calceolaria commutata Molau
- Calceolaria comosa Pennell
- Calceolaria comulcana C.Romero, Bussmann & Puppo
- Calceolaria concava Molau
- Calceolaria connatifolia Pennell
- Calceolaria conocarpa Pennell
- Calceolaria cordifolia Molau
- Calceolaria cordiformis Edwin ex Moldau
- Calceolaria corymbosa Ruiz & Pav.
- Calceolaria crassa Molau
- Calceolaria crenata Lam.
- Calceolaria crenatiflora Cav.
- Calceolaria cumbemayensis Molau
- Calceolaria cuneiformis Ruiz & Pav.
- Calceolaria cypripediiflora Kraenzl.
- Calceolaria deflexa Ruiz & Pav.
- Calceolaria densiflora Molau
- Calceolaria densifolia Phil.
- Calceolaria dentata Ruiz & Pav.
- Calceolaria dentifolia Edwin
- Calceolaria dichotoma Lam.
- Calceolaria dilatata Benth.
- Calceolaria discotheca Molau
- Calceolaria divaricata Kunth
- Calceolaria elatior Griseb.
- Calceolaria engleriana Kraenzl.
- Calceolaria ericoides Juss. ex Vahl
- Calceolaria extensa Benth.
- Calceolaria ferruginea Cav.
- Calceolaria filicaulis Clos
- Calceolaria flavida Lavandero & Santilli
- Calceolaria flavovirens C.Ehrh.
- Calceolaria flexuosa Ruiz & Pav.
- Calceolaria flosparva Edwin
- Calceolaria fothergillii Aiton
- Calceolaria frondosa Molau
- Calceolaria fulva Witasek
- Calceolaria fusca Pennell
- Calceolaria gaultherioides Molau
- Calceolaria georgiana Phil.
- Calceolaria germainii Witasek
- Calceolaria glacialis Wedd.
- Calceolaria glandulosa Poepp. ex Benth.
- Calceolaria glauca Ruiz & Pav.
- Calceolaria gossypina Benth.
- Calceolaria grandiflora Pennell
- Calceolaria harlingii Molau
- Calceolaria helianthemoides Kunth
- Calceolaria heterophylla Ruiz & Pav.
- Calceolaria hirsuta Molau
- Calceolaria hirtiflora Pennell
- Calceolaria hispida Benth.
- Calceolaria hypericina Poepp. ex Benth.
- Calceolaria hypoleuca Meyen
- Calceolaria hyssopifolia Kunth
- Calceolaria inamoena Kraenzl.
- Calceolaria inaudita Kraenzl.
- Calceolaria incachacensis Kraenzl.
- Calceolaria incarum Kraenzl.
- Calceolaria inflexa Ruiz & Pav.
- Calceolaria integrifolia L.
- Calceolaria involuta Ruiz & Pav.
- Calceolaria irazuensis Donn.Sm.
- Calceolaria jujuyensis Botta
- Calceolaria juncalensis Kraenzl.
- Calceolaria kraenzliniae Kraenzl.
- Calceolaria laevis Molau
- Calceolaria lagunae-blancae Kraenzl.
- Calceolaria lamiifolia Kunth
- Calceolaria lanata Kunth
- Calceolaria lanigera Phil.
- Calceolaria lasiocalyx Pennell
- Calceolaria latifolia Benth.
- Calceolaria lavandulifolia Kunth
- Calceolaria lehmanniana Kraenzl.
- Calceolaria lepida Phil.
- Calceolaria lepidota Kraenzl.
- Calceolaria leptantha Pennell
- Calceolaria leucanthera Pennell
- Calceolaria linearis Ruiz & Pav.
- Calceolaria llamaensis (Edwin) Molau
- Calceolaria lobata Cav.
- Calceolaria lojensis Pennell
- Calceolaria ludens Kraenzl.
- Calceolaria luteocalyx Edwin
- Calceolaria maculata Edwin
- Calceolaria martinezii Kraenzl.
- Calceolaria melissifolia Benth.
- Calceolaria mexicana Benth.
- Calceolaria meyeniana Phil.
- Calceolaria micans Molau
- Calceolaria microbefaria Kraenzl.
- Calceolaria mollissima Walp.
- Calceolaria monantha Kraenzl.
- Calceolaria morisii Walp.
- Calceolaria moyobambae Kraenzl.
- Calceolaria myriophylla Kraenzl.
- Calceolaria neglecta Molau
- Calceolaria nevadensis (Pennell) Standl.
- Calceolaria nitida Colla
- Calceolaria nivalis Kunth
- Calceolaria nudicaulis Benth.
- Calceolaria obliqua Molau
- Calceolaria oblonga Ruiz & Pav.
- Calceolaria obtusa Molau
- Calceolaria odontophylla Molau
- Calceolaria olivacea Molau
- Calceolaria oreophila Molau
- Calceolaria oxapampensis Puppo
- Calceolaria oxyphylla Molau
- Calceolaria pallida Phil.
- Calceolaria paposana Phil.
- Calceolaria paralia Cav.
- Calceolaria parviflora Gillies ex Benth.
- Calceolaria parvifolia Wedd.
- Calceolaria pavonii Benth.
- Calceolaria pedunculata Molau
- Calceolaria penlandii Pennell
- Calceolaria pennellii Descole & Borsini
- Calceolaria percaespitosa Wooden
- Calceolaria perfoliata L.f.
- Calceolaria petioalaris Cav.
- Calceolaria phaceliifolia Edwin
- Calceolaria phaeotricha Molau
- Calceolaria philippii Eyzag.
- Calceolaria picta Phil.
- Calceolaria pilosa Molau
- Calceolaria pinifolia Cav.
- Calceolaria pinnata L.
- Calceolaria pisacomensis Meyen ex Walp.
- Calceolaria platyzyga Diels
- Calceolaria plectranthifolia Walp.
- Calceolaria poikilanthes Sandwith
- Calceolaria polifolia Hook.
- Calceolaria polyclada Kraenzl.
- Calceolaria polyrhiza Cav.
- Calceolaria procera Pennell
- Calceolaria psammophila Skottsb.
- Calceolaria pulverulenta Ruiz & Pav.
- Calceolaria pumila Edwin
- Calceolaria punicea Ruiz & Pav.
- Calceolaria puppoae Molinari
- Calceolaria purpurascens (Kraenzl.) Molau
- Calceolaria purpurea Graham
- Calceolaria quitoensis Pennell
- Calceolaria ramosa Molau
- Calceolaria rariflora Molau
- Calceolaria reichlinii Edwin
- Calceolaria revoluta Pennell
- Calceolaria rhacodes Kraenzl.
- Calceolaria rhododendroides Kraenzl.
- Calceolaria rhombifolia Molau
- Calceolaria rinconada Ehrh.
- Calceolaria rivularis Kraenzl.
- Calceolaria rosmarinifolia Lam.
- Calceolaria rotundifolia Kunth
- Calceolaria rubiginosa Ehrh.
- Calceolaria rufescens Molau
- Calceolaria rugulosa Edwin
- Calceolaria ruiz-lealii Descole & Borsini
- Calceolaria rupestris Molau
- Calceolaria salicifolia Ruiz & Pav.
- Calceolaria salpoana S.Leiva, E.Rodr. & V.Rimarachín
- Calceolaria santolinoides Kraenzl.
- Calceolaria scabra Ruiz & Pav.
- Calceolaria scapiflora (Ruiz & Pav.) Benth.
- Calceolaria schickendantziana Kraenzl.
- Calceolaria sclerophylla Molau
- Calceolaria segethii Phil.
- Calceolaria semiconnata Pennell
- Calceolaria sericea Pennell
- Calceolaria serrata Lam.
- Calceolaria sessilis Ruiz & Pav.
- Calceolaria sibthorpioides Kunth
- Calceolaria sonchensis Pennell ex Edwin
- Calceolaria soratensis Kraenzl.
- Calceolaria sotarensis Pennell
- Calceolaria sparsiflora Kunze
- Calceolaria spathulata Witasek
- Calceolaria speciosa Pennell
- Calceolaria spruceana Kraenzl.
- Calceolaria stellariifolia Phil.
- Calceolaria stricta Kunth
- Calceolaria talcana J.Grau & C.Ehrh.
- Calceolaria tenella Poepp.
- Calceolaria tenuis Benth.
- Calceolaria tetragona Benth.
- Calceolaria teucrioides Griseb.
- Calceolaria thyrsiflora Graham
- Calceolaria tomentosa Ruiz & Pav.
- Calceolaria triandra (Cav.) Vahl
- Calceolaria trichanthera Molau
- Calceolaria triloba Edwin
- Calceolaria trilobata Hemsl.
- Calceolaria tripartita Ruiz & Pav.
- Calceolaria tucumana Descole
- Calceolaria umbellata Wedd.
- Calceolaria undulata Benth.
- Calceolaria uniflora Lam.
- Calceolaria urticifolia Molau
- Calceolaria utricularioides Hook. ex Benth.
- Calceolaria vaccinioides Kraenzl.
- Calceolaria valdiviana Phil.
- Calceolaria variifolia Edwin
- Calceolaria velutina Pennell
- Calceolaria velutinoides Edwin
- Calceolaria verbascifolia Phil.
- Calceolaria virgata Ruiz & Pav.
- Calceolaria viscosa Ruiz & Pav.
- Calceolaria viscosissima (Hook.) Lindl.
- Calceolaria volckmannii Phil.
- Calceolaria vulpina Kraenzl.
- Calceolaria weberbaueriana Kraenzl.
- Calceolaria × wettsteiniana Witasek
- Calceolaria williamsii Phil.
- Calceolaria zamorana Molau
