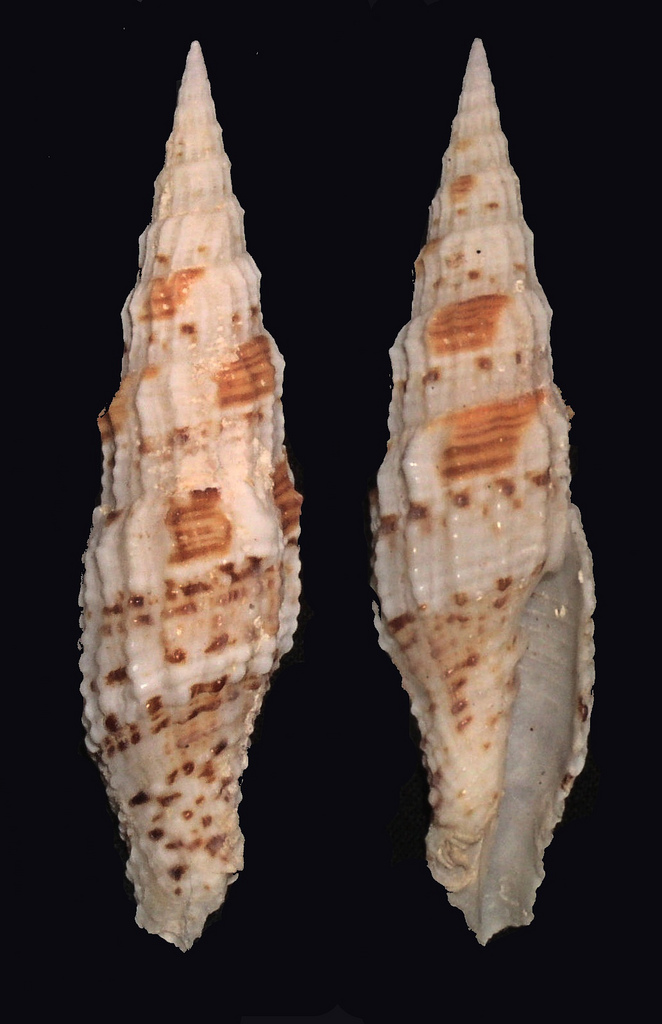
- Vexillum (Costellaria) mirabile

Scientific classification
- Kingdom: Animalia
- Phylum: Mollusca
- Class: Gastropoda
- Subclass: Caenogastropoda
- Order: Neogastropoda
- Superfamily: Turbinelloidea
- Family: Costellariidae
- Genus: Vexillum
- Species: V. mirabile

Binomial name
- Vexillum mirabile (A. Adams, 1853)

Synonyms
- Costellaria angulosa (A. Adams, 1853); Costellaria commutata (A. Adams, 1853); Costellaria macfadyeni (A. Adams, 1853); Costellaria rugosa (A. Adams, 1853); Mitra (Costellaria) commutata Dautzenberg & Bouge, 1923 ·; Mitra angulosa Reeve, 1845 (invalid: junior homonym of Mitra angulosa Küster, 1839); Mitra mirabilis A. Adams, 1853 (original combination); Vexillum (Costellaria) commutata Dautzenberg, Ph. & J.L. Bouge, 1923; Vexillum (Costellaria) mirabile (A. Adams, 1853); Vexillum (Costellaria) rugosa Dautzenberg, Ph. & J.L. Bouge, 1923; Vexillum (Costellaria) macfadyeni Cox, L.R., 1930

= Vexillum mirabile =

Species of gastropod

Vexillum mirabile, common name : miraculous mitre, is a species of small sea snail, marine gastropod mollusk in the family Costellariidae, the ribbed miters.

== Description ==
The shell size varies between 33 mm and 66 mm.

The shell is yellowish white, stained or strigated with brown.

== Distribution ==
This species occurs in the Red Sea, in the Indian Ocean off the Mascarene Basin and Madagascar, in the Pacific Ocean off the Philippines, Thailand and the Tuamotus; also off Australia (Queensland, Western Australia).
