= Calceolaria corymbosa =

Scientific classification
- Kingdom: Plantae
- Clade: Tracheophytes
- Clade: Angiosperms
- Clade: Eudicots
- Clade: Asterids
- Order: Lamiales
- Family: Calceolariaceae
- Genus: Calceolaria
- Species: C. corymbosa

Binomial name
- Calceolaria corymbosa Ruiz & Pav.

Species of plant

Calceolaria corymbosa is a species of flowering plant in the family Calceolariaceae. It is native to Chile and Argentina.
