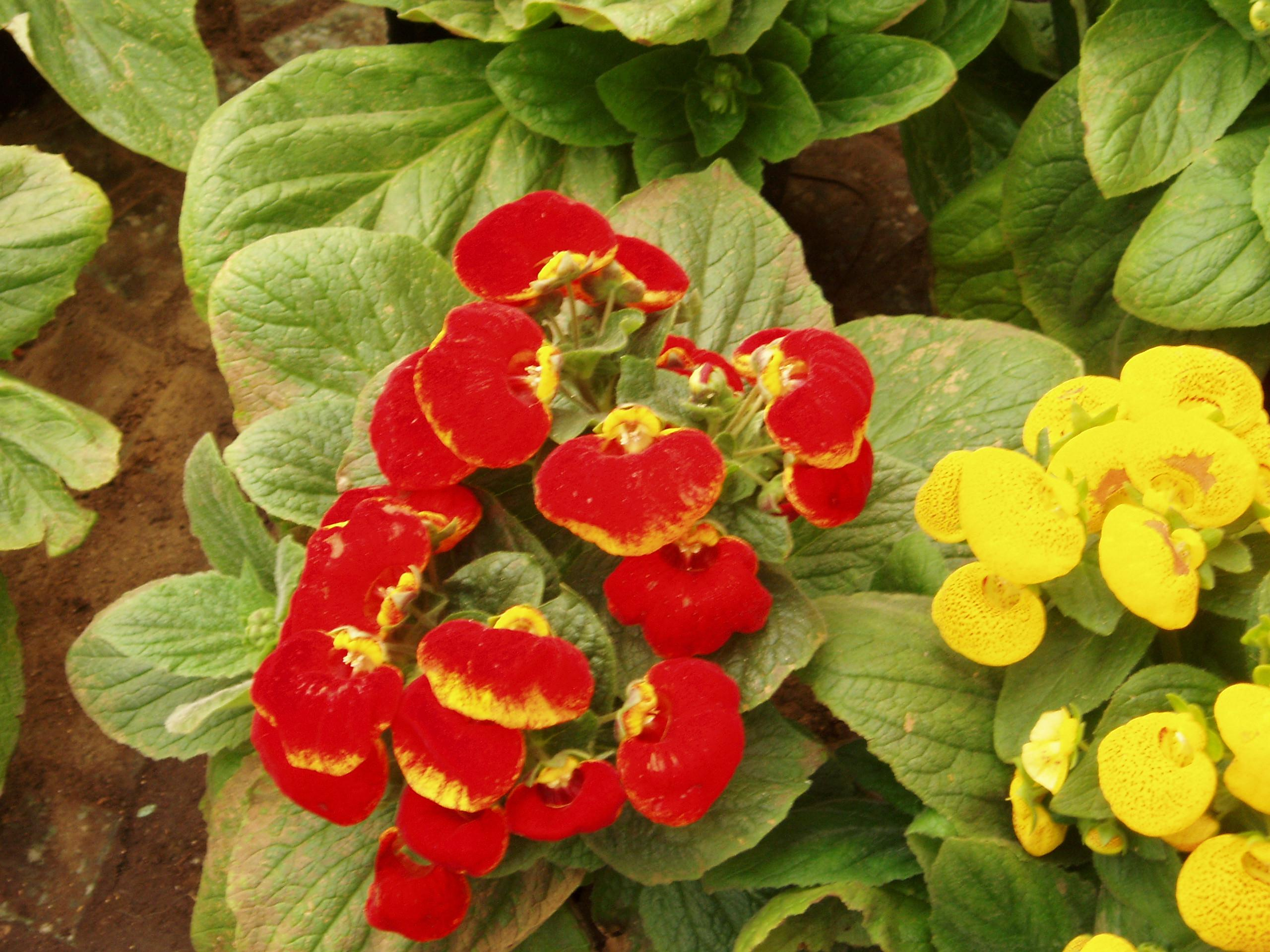
- Calceolaria herbeohybrida

Scientific classification
- Kingdom: Plantae
- Clade: Tracheophytes
- Clade: Angiosperms
- Clade: Eudicots
- Clade: Asterids
- Order: Lamiales
- Family: Calceolariaceae; Olmstead

Genera
- Calceolaria L.; Jovellana Ruiz & Pav.

= Calceolariaceae =

Family of flowering plants

Calceolariaceae is a family of flowering plants in the order Lamiales that has been recently segregated from Scrophulariaceae. The family includes two genera, Calceolaria and Jovellana. Porodittia is treated as a synonym of Calceolaria. Recent molecular phylogenies that included Calceolaria have shown not only that this genus does not belong in Scrophulariaceae (or any of the numerous families recently segregated from Scrophulariaceae) but also that it is the sister clade to the majority of the other families of the Lamiales. Morphological and chemical characters also support the separation of Calceolariaceae from Scrophulariaceae and other Lamiales. Some recent studies have supported a sister-group relationship between Calceolariaceae and Gesneriaceae. Given this close relationship, some authors opt to merge this family into Gesneriaceae as subfamily Calceolarioideae
