= List of Senecio species =

Senecio is a very large genus of flowering plants in the sunflower family (Asteraceae). As of March 2023, almost 1,500 species were accepted by Plants of the World Online.

== A ==
- Senecio abbreviatus S.Moore
- Senecio abruptus Thunb.
- Senecio acarinus Cabrera
- Senecio acetosifolius Baker
- Senecio achalensis Cabrera
- Senecio achilleifolius DC.
- Senecio actinoleucus F.Muell.
- Senecio actinotus Hand.-Mazz.
- Senecio acutifolius DC.
- Senecio acutipinnus Hand.-Mazz.
- Senecio adamantinus Bong.
- Senecio adenophyllus Meyen & Walp.
- Senecio adenostylifolius Humbert
- Senecio adenotrichius DC.
- Senecio adglacialis Cuatrec.
- Senecio adnatus DC.
- Senecio adrianicus Cabrera
- Senecio adscendens Bojer ex DC.
- Senecio aegadensis C.Brullo & Brullo
- Senecio aegyptius L.
- Senecio aequinoctialis R.E.Fr.
- Senecio aetfatensis B.Nord.
- Senecio affinis DC.
- Senecio agapatensis Sch.Bip.
- Senecio agapetes C.Jeffrey
- Senecio albanensis DC.
- Senecio albanopsis Hilliard
- Senecio alberti-smithii Cuatrec.
- Senecio albifolius DC.
- Senecio albopunctatus Bolus
- Senecio albopurpureus Kitam.
- Senecio albus J.N.Nakaj. & A.M.Teles
- Senecio alcicornis Hook. & Arn.
- Senecio algens Wedd.
- Senecio allapajanus Cuatrec.
- Senecio alloeophyllus O.Hoffm.
- Senecio almasensis Mattf.
- Senecio almeidae Phil.
- Senecio almorzaderonis Cuatrec.
- Senecio alniphilus Cabrera
- Senecio aloides DC.
- Senecio altimontanus A.M.Teles & L.D.Meireles
- Senecio altissimus Mill.
- Senecio altoandinus Cabrera
- Senecio alvarezensis Greenm.
- Senecio ambatensis Cabrera
- Senecio ambositrensis Humbert
- Senecio ameghinoi Speg.
- Senecio amplectens A.Gray
- Senecio amplificatus C.Jeffrey
- Senecio ampullaceus Hook.
- Senecio anapetes C.Jeffrey
- Senecio ancashinus Cabrera
- Senecio anconquijae Cabrera
- Senecio andapensis Humbert
- Senecio andersonii Hook.f.
- Senecio andohahelensis Humbert
- Senecio anethifolius A.Cunn. ex DC.
- Senecio angulatus L.f.
- Senecio angustifolius (Thunb.) Willd.
- Senecio angustissimus Phil.
- Senecio anomalochrous Hilliard
- Senecio antaisaka Humbert
- Senecio antambolorum Humbert
- Senecio antandroi Scott-Elliot
- Senecio anthemidiphyllus J.Rémy
- Senecio anthemifolius Harv.
- Senecio antisanae Benth.
- Senecio antitensis Baker
- Senecio antofagastanus Cabrera
- Senecio apenninus Tausch
- Senecio apensis Cabrera
- Senecio aphanactis Greene
- Senecio apolobambensis Cabrera
- Senecio aquifoliaceus DC.
- Senecio aquilaris Cabrera
- Senecio arabidifolius O.Hoffm.
- Senecio arachnanthus Franch.
- Senecio arachnolomus Wedd.
- Senecio arechavaletae Baker
- Senecio arenarius Thunb.
- Senecio argillosus Baker
- Senecio argophylloides Griseb.
- Senecio argutus Kunth
- Senecio argyreus Phil.
- Senecio aridus Greenm.
- Senecio aristeguietae Cuatrec.
- Senecio aristianus J.Rémy
- Senecio arizonicus Greene
- Senecio arleguianus J.Rémy
- Senecio arniciflorus DC.
- Senecio arnicoides Hook. & Arn.
- Senecio arnottii Hook.f.
- Senecio aronicoides DC.
- Senecio asirensis Boulos & J.R.I.Wood
- Senecio aspericaulis J.Rémy
- Senecio asperifolius Franch.
- Senecio asperulus DC.
- Senecio aspleniifolius Griseb.
- Senecio astephanus Greene
- Senecio atacamensis Phil.
- Senecio atratus Greene
- Senecio atrofuscus Grierson
- Senecio attenuatus Sch.Bip. ex Rusby
- Senecio auriculatissimus Britton
- Senecio auritifolius Cabrera
- Senecio australandinus Cabrera
- Senecio australis Willd.
- Senecio austromontanus Hilliard
- Senecio axillifoliatus Cuatrec.

== B ==
- Senecio baccharidifolius
- Senecio bahioides Hook. & Arn.
- Senecio bairdii S.L.Welsh
- Senecio balensis S.Ortiz & Vivero
- Senecio balsamicus Phil.
- Senecio bampsianus Lisowski
- Senecio banksii Hook.f.
- Senecio barbarae Cabrera
- Senecio barbatus DC.
- Senecio barkhausioides Turcz.
- Senecio barkleyi B.L.Turner
- Senecio baronii Humbert
- Senecio barorum Humbert
- Senecio barrosianus Cabrera
- Senecio bartlettii Greenm.
- Senecio basalticus Hilliard
- Senecio bathurstianus (DC.) Sch.Bip.
- Senecio baurii Oliv.
- Senecio × baxteri E.F.Marshall
- Senecio bayonnensis Boiss.
- Senecio beaufilsii Kuntze
- Senecio behrianus Sond. & F.Muell.
- Senecio belbeysius Delile
- Senecio belenensis Griseb.
- Senecio belgaumensis (Wight) C.B.Clarke
- Senecio bellis Harv.
- Senecio beltranii P.Gonzáles & Montesinos
- Senecio benaventianus J.Rémy
- Senecio bergii Hieron.
- Senecio bertramii Post
- Senecio biflorus Vahl
- Senecio bigelovii A.Gray
- Senecio biligulatus W.W.Sm.
- Senecio billieturneri T.M.Barkley
- Senecio bilushenmulatus S.S.Ying
- Senecio bipartitus Sch.Bip. ex Deflers
- Senecio bipinnatifidus Hook. & Arn.
- Senecio bipinnatisectus Belcher
- Senecio bipinnatus Less.
- Senecio bipontinii Wedd.
- Senecio biserratus Belcher
- Senecio bithynicus J.Calvo
- Senecio blanchei Soldano
- Senecio blochmaniae Greene
- Senecio boelckei Cabrera
- Senecio × bohemicus Domin
- Senecio boikoanus (Vorosch. & Schlothg.) Vorosch.
- Senecio × boiteaui Humbert
- Senecio bolivarianus Cuatrec.
- Senecio boliviensis Sch.Bip. ex Klatt
- Senecio bollei Sunding & G.Kunkel
- Senecio boluangensis H.Koyama
- Senecio bombayensis N.P.Balakr.
- Senecio bonariensis Hook. & Arn.
- Senecio botijae C.Ehrh.
- Senecio boutonii Baker
- Senecio brachyantherus (Hiern) S.Moore
- Senecio brachylobus Phil.
- Senecio brachypodus DC.
- Senecio bracteolatus Hook. & Arn.
- Senecio brasiliensis (Spreng.) Less.
- Senecio brassii Belcher
- Senecio bravensis Cabrera
- Senecio brevidentatus M.D.Hend.
- Senecio breviflorus (Kadereit) Greuter
- Senecio brevilorus Hilliard
- Senecio breviramulus Tortosa & Adr.Bartoli
- Senecio breviscapus DC.
- Senecio bridgesii Hook. & Arn.
- Senecio brigalowensis I.Thomps.
- Senecio brittenianus Hiern
- Senecio brunonianus Hook. & Arn.
- Senecio bryoniifolius Harv.
- Senecio bugalagrandis Cuatrec.
- Senecio buglossa Phil.
- Senecio × bujedoanus Elias & Pau
- Senecio bulbinefolius DC.
- Senecio bupleuroides DC.
- Senecio burchellii DC.
- Senecio burkartii Cabrera
- Senecio burtonii Hook.f.
- Senecio bustillosianus J.Rémy
- Senecio byrnensis Hilliard

== C ==
- Senecio cacaliaster Lam.
- Senecio cachinalensis Phil.
- Senecio cajamarquillensis Cabrera
- Senecio cajonensis Cabrera
- Senecio cakilefolius DC.
- Senecio calcensis Cabrera & Zardini
- Senecio calchaquinus Cabrera
- Senecio calcicola Meyen & Walp.
- Senecio californicus DC.
- Senecio calingastensis Tombesi
- Senecio callosus Sch.Bip.
- Senecio calocephalus Poepp.
- Senecio caloneotes Hilliard
- Senecio calvus Cuatrec.
- Senecio cambrensis Rosser
- Senecio campylocarpus I.Thomps.
- Senecio canabyi Humbert
- Senecio canaliculatus Bojer ex DC.
- Senecio canalipes DC.
- Senecio canchahuinganquensis Cabrera
- Senecio candicans Wall. ex DC.
- Senecio candidans DC.
- Senecio candolleanus Wall. ex DC.
- Senecio candollei Wedd.
- Senecio cano-purpureus Cuatrec.
- Senecio caparaoensis Cabrera
- Senecio capuronii Humbert
- Senecio carbonellii S.Díaz
- Senecio carbonensis C.Ezcurra, M.Ferreyra & S.Clayton
- Senecio cardaminifolius DC.
- Senecio carhuanishoensis H.Beltrán & J.Calvo
- Senecio carnerensis Greenm.
- Senecio carnosulus (Kirk) C.J.Webb
- Senecio carnosus Thunb.
- Senecio caroli-malyi Horvatić
- Senecio carpetanus Boiss. & Reut.
- Senecio carroensis DC.
- Senecio casapaltensis Ball
- Senecio castagneanus DC.
- Senecio catamarcensis Cabrera
- Senecio cathcartensis O.Hoffm.
- Senecio caudatus DC.
- Senecio cedrorum Raynal
- Senecio cedrosensis Greene
- Senecio ceratophylloides Griseb.
- Senecio cerberoanus J.Rémy
- Senecio chachaniensis Cuatrec.
- Senecio chalureaui Humbert
- Senecio chamomillifolius Phil.
- Senecio chanaralensis Phil.
- Senecio changii C.Ren & Q.E.Yang
- Senecio chavanilloensis Cuatrec.
- Senecio chihuahuensis S.Watson
- Senecio chilensis Less.
- Senecio chillanensis Cabrera
- Senecio chionogeton Wedd.
- Senecio chipauquilensis Troiani & Steibel
- Senecio chiquianensis Cabrera
- Senecio × choczensis Holub
- Senecio chodatianus Cuatrec.
- Senecio choroensis Cuatrec.
- Senecio chrysanthemum Dusén
- Senecio chrysocoma Meerb.
- Senecio chrysocomoides Hook. & Arn.
- Senecio chrysolepis Phil.
- Senecio chungtienensis C.Jeffrey & Y.L.Chen
- Senecio cinarifolius H.Lév.
- Senecio cinerarioides Kunth
- Senecio cinerascens Aiton
- Senecio cisplatinus Cabrera
- Senecio citriceps Hilliard & B.L.Burtt
- Senecio clarioneifolius J.Rémy
- Senecio clarkianus A.Gray
- Senecio claryae B.L.Turner
- Senecio claussenii Decne.
- Senecio clivicola Wedd.
- Senecio coccineus Klatt
- Senecio cochabambensis Cabrera
- Senecio cochlearifolius Bojer ex DC.
- Senecio cocuyanus Cuatrec.
- Senecio colaminus Cuatrec.
- Senecio colensoi Hook.f.
- Senecio coleophyllus Turcz.
- Senecio collinus DC.
- Senecio colpodes Bong.
- Senecio colu-huapiensis Speg.
- Senecio comberi Cabrera
- Senecio comosus Sch.Bip.
- Senecio comptonii J.C.Manning & Goldblatt
- Senecio condimentarius Cabrera
- Senecio condylus I.Thomps.
- Senecio conferruminatus I.Thomps.
- Senecio confertus Sch.Bip. ex A.Rich.
- Senecio conrathii N.E.Br.
- Senecio consanguineus DC.
- Senecio conyzifolius Baker
- Senecio conzattii Greenm.
- Senecio coquimbensis Phil.
- Senecio corcovadensis Cabrera
- Senecio cordifolius L.f.
- Senecio coriaceisquamus C.C.Chang
- Senecio cornu-cervi MacOwan
- Senecio coronatus (Thunb.) Harv.
- Senecio coronopifolius Burm.f.
- Senecio coronopodiphyllus J.Rémy
- Senecio coscayanus Ricardi & Martic.
- Senecio costaricensis R.M.King
- Senecio cotyledonis DC.
- Senecio covasii Cabrera
- Senecio covuncensis Cabrera
- Senecio coymolachensis Cabrera
- Senecio craibianus Hosseus
- Senecio crassiandinus Montesinos & Pino
- Senecio crassiflorus (Poir.) DC.
- Senecio crassifolius Willd.
- Senecio crassilodix Cuatrec.
- Senecio crassissimus Humbert
- Senecio crassiusculus DC.
- Senecio crassorhizus De Wild.
- Senecio crassulus A.Gray
- Senecio cremeiflorus Mattf.
- Senecio cremnicola Cabrera
- Senecio cremnophilus I.M.Johnst.
- Senecio crenatus Thunb.
- Senecio crenulatus DC.
- Senecio crepidifolius DC.
- Senecio crispatipilosus C.Jeffrey
- Senecio crispus Thunb.
- Senecio cristimontanus Hilliard
- Senecio crithmoides Hook. & Arn.
- Senecio cryphiactis O.Hoffm.
- Senecio cryptocephalus Cabrera
- Senecio cryptolanatus Killick
- Senecio ctenophyllus Phil.
- Senecio cuchumatanensis L.O.Williams & Ant.Molina
- Senecio cumingii Hook. & Arn.
- Senecio cuneatus Hook.f.
- Senecio cunninghamii DC.
- Senecio cyaneus O.Hoffm.
- Senecio cylindrocephalus Cabrera
- Senecio cymbalariifolius (L.) Less.
- Senecio cyrenaicus (E.A.Durand & Barratte) Borzì

== D ==
- Senecio daltonii F.Muell.
- Senecio dalzellii C.B.Clarke
- Senecio danal A.Gray
- Senecio daochengensis Y.L.Chen
- Senecio darwinii Hook. & Arn.
- Senecio davilae Phil.
- Senecio decaryi Humbert
- Senecio × decipiens Nyár.
- Senecio decurrens DC.
- Senecio deferens Griseb.
- Senecio deformis Klatt
- Senecio delbesianus Arènes
- Senecio deliculatus Cabrera & Zardini
- Senecio deltoideus Less.
- Senecio denisii Humbert
- Senecio densiserratus C.C.Chang
- Senecio dentatoalatus Mildbr. ex C.Jeffrey
- Senecio depauperatus Mattf.
- Senecio depressicola I.Thomps.
- Senecio desideratus DC.
- Senecio dewildeorum Tjitr.
- Senecio diaguita Cabrera
- Senecio diaschides D.G.Drury
- Senecio dichotomus Phil.
- Senecio diemii Cabrera
- Senecio diffusus L.f.
- Senecio digitalifolius DC.
- Senecio digitatus Phil.
- Senecio dilungensis Lisowski
- Senecio diodon DC.
- Senecio diphyllus De Wild. & Muschl.
- Senecio discodregeanus Hilliard & B.L.Burtt
- Senecio discokaraguensis C.Jeffrey
- Senecio disjectus Wedd.
- Senecio dissidens Fourc.
- Senecio dissimulans Hilliard & B.L.Burtt
- Senecio distalilobatus I.Thomps.
- Senecio divaricoides Cabrera
- Senecio diversipinnus Y.Ling
- Senecio dodrans C.Winkl.
- Senecio dolichocephalus I.Thomps.
- Senecio × dominii Hodálová
- Senecio donianus Hook. & Arn.
- Senecio doratophyllus Benth.
- Senecio doria L.
- Senecio doriiformis DC.
- Senecio doronicum (L.) L.
- Senecio doryphoroides C.Jeffrey
- Senecio doryphorus Mattf.
- Senecio dracunculoides DC.
- Senecio dregeanus DC.
- Senecio drukensis C.Marquand & Airy Shaw
- Senecio dryophyllus Meyen & Walp.
- Senecio dubitabilis C.Jeffrey & Y.L.Chen
- Senecio dumeticola S.Moore
- Senecio dumetorum Gardner
- Senecio dumosus Fourc.
- Senecio dunedinensis Belcher
- Senecio duriaei J.Gay ex DC.

== E ==
- Senecio × eboracensis R.J.Abbott & A.J.Lowe
- Senecio edgeworthii Hook.f.
- Senecio eenii (S.Moore) Merxm.
- Senecio eightsii Hook. & Arn.
- Senecio elegans L.
- Senecio eligulatus B.Nord., Moussavi & Djavadi
- Senecio eliseae J.Calvo
- Senecio ellenbeckii O.Hoffm.
- Senecio ellenbergii Cuatrec.
- Senecio elmeri Piper
- Senecio emiliopsis C.Jeffrey
- Senecio eminens Compton
- Senecio emirnensis DC.
- Senecio emmae Cabrera
- Senecio englerianus O.Hoffm.
- Senecio erechthithoides F.Muell.
- Senecio eremicola I.Thomps.
- Senecio eremophilus Richardson
- Senecio eriobasis DC.
- Senecio eriocladus Wedd.
- Senecio eriophyton J.Rémy
- Senecio eriopus Willk.
- Senecio erisithalifolius Sch.Bip. ex Baker
- Senecio erlangeri O.Hoffm.
- Senecio erosus L.f.
- Senecio ertterae T.M.Barkley
- Senecio erubescens Aiton
- Senecio eruciformis J.Rémy
- Senecio erysimoides DC.
- Senecio erythrophyllus Lazaro
- Senecio esleri C.J.Webb
- Senecio esperensis (Sykes) de Lange
- Senecio espinosae Cabrera
- Senecio espiritosantensis A.M.Teles
- Senecio esterhuyseniae J.C.Manning & Goldblatt
- Senecio eubaeus Boiss. & Heldr.
- Senecio euclaensis I.Thomps.
- Senecio euriopoides DC.
- Senecio evacoides Sch.Bip.
- Senecio evansianus Belcher
- Senecio evelynae Muschl.
- Senecio exarachnoideus C.Jeffrey
- Senecio expansus Wedd.
- Senecio extensus I.Thomps.
- Senecio exuberans R.A.Dyer
- Senecio exul Hance

== F ==
- Senecio faberi Hemsl. ex F.B.Forbes & Hemsl.
- Senecio fabrisii Cabrera
- Senecio falklandicus Hook.f.
- Senecio famatinensis Cabrera
- Senecio fanshawei Beentje
- Senecio farinaceus Sch.Bip. ex A.Rich.
- Senecio farinifer Hook. & Arn.
- Senecio featherstonei Cuatrec.
- Senecio fernandinus H.Beltrán & J.Calvo
- Senecio ferreyrae Cabrera
- Senecio ferruglii Cabrera
- Senecio festucoides J.Calvo & A.Moreira
- Senecio filaginoides DC.
- Senecio filiferus Franch.
- Senecio fistulosus Poepp. ex Less
- Senecio flaccidifolius Wedd.
- Senecio flaccidus Less.
- Senecio flagellifolius Cabrera
- Senecio flavus (Decne.) Sch.Bip.
- Senecio flexuosus E.D.Clarke
- Senecio foeniculoides Harv.
- Senecio folidentatus Cuatrec.
- Senecio fontanicola Grulich & Hodálová
- Senecio forbesii Oliv. & Hiern
- Senecio formosissimus Cuatrec.
- Senecio formosoides Cuatrec.
- Senecio formosus Kunth
- Senecio fradinii Pomel
- Senecio fragrantissimus Tortosa & Bartoli
- Senecio franchetii C.Winkl.
- Senecio francisci Phil.
- Senecio francoisii Humbert
- Senecio fremontii Torr. & A.Gray
- Senecio fresenii Sch.Bip.
- Senecio friesii Cabrera
- Senecio fruticulosus Sm.
- Senecio fukienensis Y.Ling ex C.Jeffrey & Y.L.Chen
- Senecio funckii Sch.Bip. ex Wedd.
- Senecio × futakii Hodálová

== G ==
- Senecio galeottii Hemsl.
- Senecio gallicus Vill. ex Chaix
- Senecio gamolepis Cabrera
- Senecio ganganensis Cabrera
- Senecio garaventai Cabrera
- Senecio garcibarrigae Cuatrec.
- Senecio gardneri (Thwaites) C.B.Clarke
- Senecio gariepiensis Cron
- Senecio garlandii F.Muell. ex Belcher
- Senecio garnieri Klatt
- Senecio gawlerensis M.E.Lawr.
- Senecio gayanus DC.
- Senecio gazensis S.Moore
- Senecio geniculipes Cuatrec.
- Senecio geniorum Humbert
- Senecio genisianus Cuatrec.
- Senecio georgianus DC.
- Senecio gerrardii Harv.
- Senecio gertii Zardini
- Senecio gibsonii Hook.f.
- Senecio giessii Merxm.
- Senecio gilbertii Turcz.
- Senecio gilliesianus Hieron.
- Senecio glaber Less.
- Senecio glaberrimus DC.
- Senecio glabratus Hook. & Arn.
- Senecio glabrescens (DC.) Sch.Bip.
- Senecio glandulifer Dematt. & Cristóbal
- Senecio glandulosohirtellus Reiche
- Senecio glandulosolanosus Thell.
- Senecio glandulosopilosus Volkens & Muschl.
- Senecio glandulosus D.Don ex Hook. & Arn.
- Senecio glastifolius L.f.
- Senecio glaucophyllus Cheeseman
- Senecio glaucus L.
- Senecio glomeratus Desf. ex Poir.
- Senecio glossanthus (Sond.) Belcher
- Senecio glutinarius DC.
- Senecio glutinosus Thunb.
- Senecio gnidioides Phil.
- Senecio gnoma P.Royen
- Senecio godmanii Hemsl.
- Senecio goldmanii Greene
- Senecio goldsackii Phil.
- Senecio gossweileri Torre
- Senecio gossypinus Baker
- Senecio graciellae Cabrera
- Senecio graciliflorus DC.
- Senecio gracilipes A.Gray
- Senecio gramineticola C.Jeffrey
- Senecio gramineus Harv.
- Senecio grandiflorus P.J.Bergius
- Senecio grandis Gardner
- Senecio grandjotii Cabrera
- Senecio gregatus Hilliard
- Senecio gregorii F.Muell.
- Senecio griffithii Hook.f. & Thomson ex C.B.Clarke
- Senecio grindeliifolius DC.
- Senecio grisebachii Baker
- Senecio grossidens Dusén ex Malme
- Senecio guascensis Cuatrec.
- Senecio guatulamensis Muñoz-Schick, A.Moreira & Trenq.
- Senecio gunckelii Cabrera
- Senecio gunnii (Hook.f.) Belcher
- Senecio gymnocaulos Phil.
- Senecio gypsicola (R.J.Bates) I.Thomps.

== H ==
- Senecio hadiensis Forssk.
- Senecio haenkei DC.
- Senecio hakeifolius Bertero ex DC.
- Senecio halimifolius L.
- Senecio hallii Hieron.
- Senecio halophilus I.Thomps.
- Senecio haloragis J.Rémy
- Senecio hamersleyensis I.Thomps.
- Senecio hansweberi Cuatrec.
- Senecio harazianus Deflers
- Senecio harleyi D.J.N.Hind
- Senecio harveyanus MacOwan
- Senecio hastatifolius Cabrera
- Senecio hastatus L.
- Senecio hastifolius (L.f.) Less.
- Senecio hatcherianus O.Hoffm.
- Senecio hatschbachii Cabrera
- Senecio hauwai Sykes
- Senecio haygarthii M.Taylor ex Hilliard
- Senecio hebdingii (Rauh & Buchloh) G.D.Rowley
- Senecio hebetatus Wedd.
- Senecio hedbergii C.Jeffrey
- Senecio hederiformis Cron
- Senecio × heimerlii Müllner
- Senecio helgae Cabrera
- Senecio helichrysoides F.Muell.
- Senecio heliopsis Hilliard & B.L.Burtt
- Senecio helminthioides (Sch.Bip.) Hilliard
- Senecio helodes Benth.
- Senecio × helwingii Beger ex Hegi
- Senecio hemmendorffii Malme
- Senecio × herborgii C.Jeffrey
- Senecio hercynicus Herborg
- Senecio hermannii B.Nord.
- Senecio hesperidum Jahand., Maire & Weiller
- Senecio heterodontus Greenm.
- Senecio heteroschizus Baker
- Senecio heterotrichius DC.
- Senecio hewrensis (Dalzell) Hook.f.
- Senecio hickenii Hauman
- Senecio hieracioides DC.
- Senecio hieracium J.Rémy
- Senecio hieronymi Griseb.
- Senecio hilarianus Cabrera
- Senecio hildebrandtii Baker
- Senecio hirsutilobus Hilliard
- Senecio hirsutulus Phil.
- Senecio hirtifolius DC.
- Senecio hirto-crassus Humbert
- Senecio hirtus Cabrera
- Senecio hispidissimus I.Thomps.
- Senecio hispidulus A.Rich.
- Senecio hjertingii Cabrera
- Senecio hochstetteri Sch.Bip. ex A.Rich.
- Senecio hoehnei Cabrera
- Senecio hoggariensis Batt. & Trab.
- Senecio hohenackeri Sch.Bip.
- Senecio hollandii Compton
- Senecio holubii Hutch. & Burtt Davy
- Senecio hooglandii Belcher
- Senecio hortensiae A.M.Teles
- Senecio howeanus Belcher
- Senecio hualtaranensis Peten., Ariza & Del Vitto
- Senecio huaquilicus Cabrera & Zardini
- Senecio huaynaputinaensis Montesinos & Chicalla
- Senecio huitrinicus Cabrera
- Senecio humbertii C.C.Chang
- Senecio humidanus C.Jeffrey
- Senecio humifusus (Hook.f.) Cabrera
- Senecio humilis Desf.
- Senecio humillimus Sch.Bip.
- Senecio hydrophiloides Rydb.
- Senecio hydrophilus Nutt.
- Senecio hyoseridifolius Wedd.
- Senecio hyoseridis (Benth.) L.Salomón & S.E.Freire
- Senecio hypochoerideus DC.
- Senecio hypoleucus F.Muell. ex Benth.
- Senecio hypsiandinus Cuatrec.
- Senecio hypsobates Wedd.

== I ==
- Senecio icoglossoides Arechav.
- Senecio icoglossus DC.
- Senecio ilicifolius Thunb.
- Senecio iljinii Schischk.
- Senecio illapelinus Phil.
- Senecio illinitus Phil.
- Senecio ilsae A.Santos & Reyes-Bet.
- Senecio immixtus C.Jeffrey
- Senecio inaequidens DC.
- Senecio incomptus DC.
- Senecio incrassatus Lowe
- Senecio inexpectatus (Cronquist) Al Schneid.
- Senecio infiernillensis Cuatrec.
- Senecio infimus Cabrera
- Senecio infirmus C.Jeffrey
- Senecio ingeliensis Hilliard
- Senecio inghamii Montesinos
- Senecio inornatus DC.
- Senecio integerrimus Nutt.
- Senecio interpositus I.Thomps.
- Senecio intricatus S.Moore
- Senecio invalidus C.Jeffrey
- Senecio iodanthus Greenm.
- Senecio iranicus B.Nord.
- Senecio irgangii Matzenb. & Mondin
- Senecio isabelis S.Díaz
- Senecio isatideus DC.
- Senecio isatidoides E.Phillips & C.A.Sm.
- Senecio iscoensis Hieron.
- Senecio isernii Phil.
- Senecio ishcaivilcanus Cuatrec.

== J ==
- Senecio jacalensis Greenm.
- Senecio jacksonii S.Moore
- Senecio jacobaeiformis J.Rémy
- Senecio jaffuelii Cabrera
- Senecio jarae Phil.
- Senecio jilesii Cabrera
- Senecio jobii Cabrera
- Senecio joharchii F.Ghahrem., Ezazi, Rahch. & Attar
- Senecio johnstonianus Cabrera
- Senecio jorquerae Phil.
- Senecio juergensii Mattf.
- Senecio jujuyensis Cabrera
- Senecio julianus Speg.
- Senecio junceus (Less.) Harv.
- Senecio jungei Phil.
- Senecio jungioides Cabrera
- Senecio juniperinus L.f.
- Senecio junodii Hutch. & Burtt Davy

== K ==
- Senecio kacondensis S.Moore
- Senecio kalambatitrensis Humbert
- Senecio kalingenwae Hilliard & B.L.Burtt
- Senecio karaguensis O.Hoffm.
- Senecio katangensis O.Hoffm.
- Senecio kayomborum Beentje
- Senecio keniophytum R.E.Fr.
- Senecio kenteicus Grubov
- Senecio kerdousianus Gómiz & Llamas
- Senecio kermadecensis Belcher
- Senecio × kerneri Błocki ex Nyman
- Senecio killipii Cabrera
- Senecio kingbishopii Cuatrec.
- Senecio kingii Hook.f.
- Senecio klattii Greenm.
- Senecio kolenatianus C.A.Mey.
- Senecio kongboensis Ludlow
- Senecio kosterae Cabrera
- Senecio kotschyanus Boiss.
- Senecio krapovickasii Cabrera
- Senecio krascheninnikovii Schischk.
- Senecio kuhbieri Cuatrec.
- Senecio kuluensis S.Moore
- Senecio kundaicus C.E.C.Fisch.
- Senecio kundelungensis Lisowski
- Senecio kunturinus Cabrera
- Senecio kuntzeanus Dinter
- Senecio kurzii C.B.Clarke ex Hook.f.

== L ==
- Senecio laceratus (F.Muell.) Belcher
- Senecio lacustrinus I.Thomps.
- Senecio laetevirens Phil.
- Senecio laevicaulis DC.
- Senecio laevigatus Thunb.
- Senecio laevis Humbert
- Senecio lagascanus DC.
- Senecio lageniformis I.Thomps.
- Senecio lamarckianus Bullock
- Senecio × lamottei Rouy
- Senecio lanceus Aiton
- Senecio lancidentatus Cuatrec.
- Senecio landbeckii Phil.
- Senecio langei Malme
- Senecio lanibracteus I.Thomps.
- Senecio lanifer Mart. ex C.Jeffrey
- Senecio lanosissimus Cabrera
- Senecio larahuinensis H.Beltrán & A.Galán
- Senecio larecajensis Cabrera
- Senecio laricifolius Kunth
- Senecio laseguei Hombr. & Jacquinot ex Decne.
- Senecio lasiocaulon T.M.Barkley
- Senecio lastarrianus J.Rémy
- Senecio latecorymbosus Gilli
- Senecio latibracteatus Humbert
- Senecio laticipes Bruyns
- Senecio latiflorus Wedd.
- Senecio latifolius DC.
- Senecio latissimifolius S.Moore
- Senecio lautus Sol. ex G.Forst.
- Senecio lavandulifolius Wall. ex DC.
- Senecio lawalreeanus Lisowski
- Senecio lawsonii Gamble
- Senecio laxus DC.
- Senecio leandrii Humbert
- Senecio legionensis Lange
- Senecio lejolyanus Lisowski
- Senecio lelyi Hutch.
- Senecio lemmonii A.Gray
- Senecio leptocaulos Phil.
- Senecio leptolobus DC.
- Senecio leptopterus Mesfin
- Senecio leptoschizus Bong.
- Senecio lessingii Harv.
- Senecio letouzeyanus Lisowski
- Senecio leucadendron (G.Forst.) Hemsl.
- Senecio leucanthemifolius Poir.
- Senecio leucanthemoides Cuatrec.
- Senecio leuceria Cabrera
- Senecio leucoglossus F.Muell.
- Senecio leucomallus A.Gray
- Senecio leucopeplus Cabrera
- Senecio leucophorbius Cuatrec.
- Senecio leucophyton Phil.
- Senecio leucostachys Baker
- Senecio leucus Phil.
- Senecio lewallei Lisowski
- Senecio lhasaensis Y.Ling ex Y.L.Chen, S.Yun Liang & K.Y.Pan
- Senecio liangshanensis C.Jeffrey & Y.L.Chen
- Senecio lijiangensis C.Jeffrey & Y.L.Chen
- Senecio lilloi Cabrera
- Senecio linaresensis Soldano
- Senecio linariifolius Poepp. ex DC.
- Senecio linearifolius A.Rich.
- Senecio linearilobus Bong.
- Senecio lineatus DC.
- Senecio lingianus C.Jeffrey & Y.L.Chen
- Senecio linifolius L.
- Senecio lisowskii Long Wang & Beentje
- Senecio lithophilus Greenm.
- Senecio lithostaurus Cabrera
- Senecio litorosus Fourc.
- Senecio littoreus Thunb.
- Senecio lividus L.
- Senecio loayzanus Cabrera
- Senecio lobelioides DC.
- Senecio lombokensis J.Kost.
- Senecio × londinensis Lousley
- Senecio longicollaris I.Thomps.
- Senecio longipilus I.Thomps.
- Senecio longiscapus Bojer ex DC.
- Senecio lopez-guillenii Cabrera
- Senecio lopez-mirandae Cabrera
- Senecio lopezii Boiss.
- Senecio lorentziella Hicken
- Senecio lorentzii Griseb.
- Senecio ludens C.B.Clarke
- Senecio luembensis De Wild. & Muschl.
- Senecio lugens Richardson
- Senecio × lulioi M.G.López & Xifreda
- Senecio lusitanicus (Cout.) Pérez-Romero
- Senecio luzoniensis Merr.
- Senecio lycopodioides Schltr.
- Senecio lydenburgensis Hutch. & Burtt Davy
- Senecio lygodes Hiern
- Senecio lyonii A.Gray ex Lyon
- Senecio lyratus Forssk.

== M ==
- Senecio mabberleyi C.Jeffrey
- Senecio macedonicus Griseb.
- Senecio macowanii Hilliard
- Senecio macranthus A.Rich.
- Senecio macrocarpus F.Muell. ex Belcher
- Senecio macrocephalus DC.
- Senecio macroglossoides Hilliard
- Senecio macroglossus DC.
- Senecio macrospermus DC.
- Senecio macrotis Baker
- Senecio maculatus Cabrera
- Senecio madagascariensis Poir.
- Senecio madariagae Phil.
- Senecio madidiensis J.Calvo & A.Fuentes
- Senecio madrasensis C.Jeffrey
- Senecio madrensis A.Gray
- Senecio maeviae Cabrera
- Senecio magnificus F.Muell.
- Senecio mahindae G.L.Nesom & Vorobik
- Senecio mairetianus DC.
- Senecio malacitanus Huter
- Senecio malacophyllus Dusén
- Senecio malaissei Lisowski
- Senecio mandrarensis Humbert
- Senecio manguensis Cabrera & Zardini
- Senecio mapuche Cabrera
- Senecio maranguensis O.Hoffm.
- Senecio margaritae C.Jeffrey
- Senecio marginalis Hilliard
- Senecio mariettae Muschl.
- Senecio maritimus L.f.
- Senecio marmorae Moris
- Senecio marnieri Humbert
- Senecio marojejyensis Humbert
- Senecio marotiri C.J.Webb
- Senecio martinensis Dusén
- Senecio martirensis T.M.Barkley
- Senecio massaicus (Maire) Maire
- Senecio mathewsii Wedd.
- Senecio matricariifolius DC.
- Senecio mattfeldianus Cabrera
- Senecio mattirolii Chiov.
- Senecio maulinus Reiche
- Senecio mauricei Hilliard & B.L.Burtt
- Senecio maydae Merxm.
- Senecio mayurii C.E.C.Fisch.
- Senecio mbuluzensis Compton
- Senecio megacephalus Nutt.
- Senecio megaglossus F.Muell.
- Senecio megalanthus Y.L.Chen
- Senecio megaoreinus Zardini
- Senecio melanandrus (Wedd.) J.Calvo, A.Granda & V.A.Funk
- Senecio melanocalyx Cuatrec.
- Senecio melanolepis DC.
- Senecio melanopotamicus Cabrera
- Senecio melastomifolius Baker
- Senecio menesesiae J.Calvo
- Senecio mesembryanthemoides Bojer ex DC.
- Senecio mesembrynus Cabrera
- Senecio mesogrammoides O.Hoffm.
- Senecio meuselii Rauh
- Senecio meyeri-johannis Engl.
- Senecio microalatus C.Jeffrey
- Senecio microbasis I.Thomps.
- Senecio microglossus DC.
- Senecio microphyllus Phil.
- Senecio micropifolius DC.
- Senecio microspermus DC.
- Senecio microtis Phil.
- Senecio mimetes Hutch. & R.A.Dyer
- Senecio minesinus Cuatrec.
- Senecio minimus Poir.
- Senecio minutifolius Phil.
- Senecio mirus Klatt
- Senecio miser Hook.f.
- Senecio mishmi C.B.Clarke
- Senecio mitonis Cuatrec.
- Senecio mitophyllus C.Jeffrey
- Senecio mlilwanensis Compton
- Senecio modestus Wedd.
- Senecio mohavensis A.Gray
- Senecio mohinorensis Greenm.
- Senecio molinae Phil.
- Senecio montevidensis (Spreng.) Baker
- Senecio monticola DC.
- Senecio monttianus J.Rémy
- Senecio mooreanus Hutch. & Burtt Davy
- Senecio moorei R.E.Fr.
- Senecio mooreioides C.Jeffrey
- Senecio moqueguensis Montesinos
- Senecio morisii J.Calvo & Bacch.
- Senecio morotonensis C.Jeffrey
- Senecio mucronatus Willd.
- Senecio mulgediifolius S.Schauer
- Senecio muliensis C.Jeffrey & Y.L.Chen
- Senecio multibracteatus Harv.
- Senecio multicaulis A.Rich.
- Senecio multiceps N.P.Balakr.
- Senecio multidentatus Sch.Bip. ex Hemsl.
- Senecio multidenticulatus Humbert
- Senecio multilobus C.C.Chang
- Senecio munnozii Cabrera
- Senecio muricatus Thunb.
- Senecio murinus Phil.
- Senecio murorum J.Rémy
- Senecio murrayanus Wawra
- Senecio mustersii Speg.
- Senecio myriocephalus Sch.Bip. ex A.Rich.
- Senecio myriophyllus Phil.

== N ==
- Senecio namnaoensis H.Koyama
- Senecio nanus Sch.Bip. ex A.Rich.
- Senecio napifolius MacOwan
- Senecio narinyonis Cuatrec.
- Senecio natalicola Hilliard
- Senecio navicularis Humbert
- Senecio navugabensis C.Jeffrey
- Senecio neaei DC.
- Senecio × neapolitanus Evers
- Senecio neelgherryanus DC.
- Senecio nemiae Adr.Bartoli, Tortosa & S.E.Freire
- Senecio nemoralis Dusén
- Senecio nemorensis L.
- Senecio neobakeri Humbert
- Senecio neoglandulosus Cuatrec.
- Senecio neoviscidulus Soldano
- Senecio neoviscosus Cuatrec.
- Senecio neowebsteri S.F.Blake
- Senecio nevadensis Boiss. & Reut.
- Senecio ngandae Beentje
- Senecio ngoyanus Hilliard
- Senecio niederleinii Cabrera
- Senecio nigrapicus I.Thomps.
- Senecio nigrescens Hook. & Arn.
- Senecio nigrocinctus Franch.
- Senecio niveoaureus Cuatrec.
- Senecio niveoplanus I.Thomps.
- Senecio nodiflorus C.C.Chang
- Senecio nublensis Soldano
- Senecio nuraniae Roldugin
- Senecio nutans Sch.Bip.
- Senecio nyangani Beentje
- Senecio nyungwensis P.Maquet

== O ==
- Senecio obesus Klatt
- Senecio obtectus Kuntze
- Senecio ochoanus Cuatrec.
- Senecio ochrocarpus Oliv. & Hiern
- Senecio octolepis Griseb.
- Senecio octophyllus Sch.Bip. & Rusby
- Senecio odonellii Cabrera
- Senecio odontophyllus C.Jeffrey
- Senecio odontopterus DC.
- Senecio odoratus Hornem.
- Senecio oederifolius DC.
- Senecio oerstedianus Benth.
- Senecio oflasii Yıld. & Kılıç
- Senecio oldfieldii I.Thomps.
- Senecio oleosus Vell.
- Senecio olgae Regel & Schmalh.
- Senecio oligoleucus Baker
- Senecio oligophyllus Baker
- Senecio olivaceobracteatus Ricardi & Martic.
- Senecio olympicus Boiss.
- Senecio oophyllus C.Jeffrey
- Senecio × orarius J.M.Black
- Senecio oreinus Cabrera
- Senecio oreophyton J.Rémy
- Senecio orizabensis Sch.Bip. ex Hemsl.
- Senecio ornatus S.Moore
- Senecio oryzetorum Diels
- Senecio ostenii Mattf.
- Senecio otaeguianus Phil.
- Senecio othonniflorus DC.
- Senecio otites Kunze ex DC.
- Senecio otopterus Griseb.
- Senecio otuscensis Cabrera
- Senecio ovatus (G.Gaertn., B.Mey. & Scherb.) Willd.
- Senecio oxyodontus DC.
- Senecio oxyphyllus DC.
- Senecio oxyriifolius DC.
- Senecio × oyensis Hepp
- Senecio ozolotepecanus B.L.Turner

== P ==
- Senecio paarlensis DC.
- Senecio pachyphyllos J.Rémy
- Senecio pachyrhizus O.Hoffm.
- Senecio paludaffinis Hilliard
- Senecio pampeanus Cabrera
- Senecio panduratus Less.
- Senecio panduriformis Hilliard
- Senecio paniculatus P.J.Bergius
- Senecio pappii Ricardi & Martic.
- Senecio papuanus (Lauterb.) Belcher
- Senecio paraguariensis Mattf.
- Senecio parascitus Hilliard
- Senecio parentalis Hilliard & B.L.Burtt
- Senecio parodii Cabrera
- Senecio parryi A.Gray
- Senecio parvifolius DC.
- Senecio parvocapitatus Cabrera
- Senecio pascoensis Cabrera
- Senecio pascuiandinus Cuatrec.
- Senecio patagonicus Hook. & Arn.
- Senecio patersonianus R.M.Burton
- Senecio pattersonensis Hoover
- Senecio pattersonii B.L.Turner
- Senecio paucicalyculatus Klatt
- Senecio paucidentatus DC.
- Senecio pauciflosculosus C.Jeffrey
- Senecio paucijugus Baker
- Senecio pauciradiatus Belcher
- Senecio paulensis Bong.
- Senecio paulsenii O.Hoffm.
- Senecio pearsonii Hutch.
- Senecio peguanus DC.
- Senecio pellitus A.Gray
- Senecio pellucidus DC.
- Senecio pelolepis I.M.Johnst.
- Senecio pelquensis Dusén
- Senecio peltophorus Brenan
- Senecio pemehuensis Soldano
- Senecio peninsularis Vasey & Rose
- Senecio penninervius DC.
- Senecio pensilis Greenm.
- Senecio pentactinus Klatt
- Senecio pentaphyllus Phil.
- Senecio pentapterus Cabrera
- Senecio pentecostus Hiern
- Senecio pentlandianus DC.
- Senecio perezii Cabrera
- Senecio perralderianus Coss.
- Senecio perrieri Humbert
- Senecio perrottetii DC.
- Senecio persicifolius L.
- Senecio peruensis Cuatrec.
- Senecio peteroanus Phil.
- Senecio petiolaris DC.
- Senecio petraeus Boiss. & Reut.
- Senecio phalacrolaenus DC.
- Senecio phelleus I.Thomps.
- Senecio philippicus Regel & Körn.
- Senecio philippii Sch.Bip. ex Wedd.
- Senecio phlomidifolius H.Beltrán
- Senecio phylicifolius Poepp. ex DC.
- Senecio pichineuquensis Tortosa & Adr.Bartoli
- Senecio pickeringii A.Gray
- Senecio picridioides (Turcz.) M.E.Lawr.
- Senecio picridis S.Schauer
- Senecio pillansii Levyns
- Senecio pilquensis H.Buek
- Senecio pinacatensis Felger
- Senecio pinachensis Cabrera
- Senecio pinguiculus Pomel
- Senecio pinnatifidus Less.
- Senecio pinnatifolius A.Rich.
- Senecio pinnatilobatus Sch.Bip.
- Senecio pinnatipartitus Sch.Bip. ex Oliv.
- Senecio pinnatus Poir.
- Senecio pinnulatus Thunb.
- Senecio piptocoma O.Hoffm.
- Senecio pirottae Chiov.
- Senecio pissisi Phil.
- Senecio piurensis Sagást. & Zardini
- Senecio planiflorus Kunze ex Cabrera
- Senecio plantagineoides C.Jeffrey
- Senecio platensis Arechav.
- Senecio platylepis DC.
- Senecio platypus Greenm.
- Senecio pleistophyllus C.Jeffrey
- Senecio poggeanus Mattf.
- Senecio pogonias Cabrera
- Senecio pokohinuensis (de Lange & B.G.Murray) de Lange
- Senecio polelensis Hilliard
- Senecio polyadenus Hedberg
- Senecio polyanthemoides Sch.Bip.
- Senecio polygaloides Phil.
- Senecio polyodon DC.
- Senecio polyphyllus Kunze ex DC.
- Senecio polypodioides (Greene) T.Durand & B.D.Jacks.
- Senecio pongoensis Cuatrec.
- Senecio portalesianus J.Rémy
- Senecio portulacoides J.Rémy
- Senecio poseideonis Hilliard & B.L.Burtt
- Senecio potosianus Klatt
- Senecio powellii B.L.Turner
- Senecio praeruptorum Sch.Bip.
- Senecio praeteritus Killick
- Senecio prenanthifolius Phil.
- Senecio prenanthoides A.Rich.
- Senecio prionopterus B.L.Rob. & Greenm.
- Senecio procumbens Kunth
- Senecio productus I.Thomps.
- Senecio promatensis Matzenb.
- Senecio propinquus Schischk.
- Senecio propior S.Moore
- Senecio prostratus Klatt
- Senecio proteus J.Rémy
- Senecio provincialis Druce
- Senecio pseud-otites Griseb.
- Senecio pseudalmeidae Cabrera
- Senecio pseudaspericaulis Cabrera
- Senecio pseuderucoides Cabrera
- Senecio pseudodensiserratus T.J.Tong, M.Tang, C.Ren & Q.E.Yang
- Senecio pseudodepressus L.Salomón & S.E.Freire
- Senecio pseudoformosus Cuatrec.
- Senecio pseudolongifolius Sch.Bip. ex J.Calvo
- Senecio pseudomairei H.Lév.
- Senecio pseudoorientalis Schischk.
- Senecio pseudopicridis T.M.Barkley
- Senecio pseudostigophlebius Cabrera
- Senecio pseudosubsessilis C.Jeffrey
- Senecio psilocarpus Belcher & Albr.
- Senecio psilophyllus I.Thomps.
- Senecio ptarmicifolius Bory
- Senecio pteridophyllus Franch.
- Senecio pterophorus DC.
- Senecio puberulus DC.
- Senecio pubescens Phil.
- Senecio pubigerus L.
- Senecio puchei Phil.
- Senecio pudicus Greene
- Senecio pulcher Hook. & Arn.
- Senecio pulicarioides Baker
- Senecio pumilus Tortosa & Bartoli
- Senecio puna-sessilis Cuatrec.
- Senecio punae Cabrera
- Senecio purpureus L.
- Senecio purtschelleri Engl.
- Senecio pycnanthus Phil.
- Senecio pygmaeus DC.
- Senecio pygmophyllus (S.F.Blake) J.Calvo, A.Granda & V.A.Funk
- Senecio pyrenaicus L.
- Senecio pyrenophilus Cuatrec.
- Senecio pyrophilus Zoll. & Moritzi

== Q ==
- Senecio qathlambanus Hilliard
- Senecio quadridentatus Labill.
- Senecio quartziticola Humbert
- Senecio quaylei T.M.Barkley
- Senecio queenslandicus I.Thomps.
- Senecio quinquelepis Hieron. ex Cabrera
- Senecio quinqueligulatus C.Winkl.
- Senecio quinquelobus (Thunb.) DC.
- Senecio quinquenervius Sond.
- Senecio quinqueradiatus Boiss. ex DC.

== R ==
- Senecio radiatus Cuatrec.
- Senecio radiolatus F.Muell.
- Senecio ragazzii Chiov.
- Senecio ragonesei Cabrera
- Senecio rahmeri Phil.
- Senecio ramboanus Cabrera
- Senecio ramentaceus Baker
- Senecio ramosissimus DC.
- Senecio ramosus Wall.
- Senecio randii S.Moore
- Senecio rapifolius Nutt.
- Senecio rauchii Matzenb.
- Senecio rauhii Cuatrec.
- Senecio rauranus Cuatrec.
- Senecio reedii Phil.
- Senecio regis H.Rob.
- Senecio rehmannii Bolus
- Senecio reicheanus Cabrera
- Senecio reitzianus Cabrera
- Senecio renjifoanus Phil.
- Senecio repandus Thunb.
- Senecio repangae de Lange & B.G.Murray
- Senecio repollensis Cabrera
- Senecio reptans Turcz.
- Senecio resectus Bojer ex DC.
- Senecio retanensis Cabrera
- Senecio retortus Benth.
- Senecio retrorsus DC.
- Senecio rhammatophyllus Mattf.
- Senecio rhizocephalus Turcz.
- Senecio rhizomatus Rusby
- Senecio rhomboideus Harv.
- Senecio rhyacophilus Greenm.
- Senecio rhyncholaenus DC.
- Senecio ricardii Martic. & Quezada
- Senecio richardsonii B.L.Turner
- Senecio richii A.Gray
- Senecio riddellii Torr. & A.Gray
- Senecio rigidus L.
- Senecio riograndensis Matzenb.
- Senecio riojanus Cabrera
- Senecio riomayensis B.L.Turner
- Senecio riskindii B.L.Turner & T.M.Barkley
- Senecio ritoveganus B.L.Turner
- Senecio robertiifolius DC.
- Senecio rodolfoi X.Wu
- Senecio romeroi Cuatrec.
- Senecio rorippifolius Cabrera
- Senecio roseiflorus R.E.Fr.
- Senecio roseoandinus Montesinos & R.Zárate
- Senecio roseus Sch.Bip.
- Senecio rosinae Gamisans
- Senecio rosmarinifolius L.f.
- Senecio rosmarinus Phil.
- Senecio rossianus Mattf.
- Senecio royleanus DC.
- Senecio rubrilacunae Cuatrec.
- Senecio rudbeckiifolius Meyen & Walp.
- Senecio rufiglandulosus Colenso
- Senecio rugegensis Muschl.
- Senecio ruiz-lealii Cabrera
- Senecio runcinifolius J.H.Willis
- Senecio ruthenensis Maz. & Timb.-Lagr.
- Senecio ruwenzoriensis S.Moore

== S ==
- Senecio sabinjoensis Muschl.
- Senecio saboureaui Humbert
- Senecio sacramentanus Wooton & Standl.
- Senecio sakalavorum Humbert
- Senecio sakamaliensis (Humbert) Humbert
- Senecio salsuginea H.Duman & Vural
- Senecio saltensis Hook. & Arn.
- Senecio sanagastae Cabrera
- Senecio sandersianus B.L.Turner
- Senecio sandersii B.L.Turner
- Senecio sandersonii Harv.
- Senecio sandwithii Cabrera
- Senecio sangayensis D.L.A.Vásquez & J.Calvo
- Senecio saniensis Hilliard & B.L.Burtt
- Senecio santanderensis Cuatrec.
- Senecio santelicis Phil.
- Senecio santiagoensis Kuntze
- Senecio saposhnikovii Krasch. & N.Schipcz.
- Senecio sarracenicus L.
- Senecio satipoensis Cuatrec.
- Senecio saucensis Cabrera
- Senecio × saundersii W.Sauer & E.Beck
- Senecio saussureoides Hand.-Mazz.
- Senecio saxicola Wedd.
- Senecio saxipunae Cuatrec.
- Senecio scaberulus (Hook.f.) D.G.Drury
- Senecio scabrellus I.Thomps.
- Senecio scandens Buch.-Ham. ex D.Don
- Senecio scapiodes Aguilar-Cano & D.J.N.Hind
- Senecio schimperi Sch.Bip. ex Hochst.
- Senecio schonemanni Phil.
- Senecio schultzii Hochst. ex A.Rich.
- Senecio schweinfurthii O.Hoffm.
- Senecio schyzotus (Cabrera) Iamonico
- Senecio scitus Hutch. & Burtt Davy
- Senecio scoparius Harv.
- Senecio scopolii Hoppe & Hornsch. ex Bluff & Fingerh.
- Senecio scopulorum Poepp.
- Senecio scorzonella Greene
- Senecio scorzonerifolius Meyen & Walp.
- Senecio scrobicarioides DC.
- Senecio sectilis Griseb.
- Senecio segethi Phil.
- Senecio selloi DC.
- Senecio semiamplexifolius De Wild.
- Senecio seminiveus J.M.Wood & M.S.Evans
- Senecio sennikovii Kottaim.
- Senecio sepium Sch.Bip. & Rusby
- Senecio sericeonitens Speg.
- Senecio serpentinicola Jeanm.
- Senecio serra Hook.
- Senecio serratiformis I.Thomps.
- Senecio serratuloides DC.
- Senecio serrulatus DC.
- Senecio serrurioides Turcz.
- Senecio shabensis Lisowski
- Senecio shaoakoulatus S.S.Ying
- Senecio sheldonensis A.E.Porsild
- Senecio silphioides Hieron.
- Senecio simplicissimus Bojer ex DC.
- Senecio sinapoides Rusby
- Senecio sinuatilobus DC.
- Senecio sipoccruncus Cabrera
- Senecio sisymbriifolius DC.
- Senecio skirrhodon DC.
- Senecio skottsbergii Cabrera
- Senecio × slovacus Hodálová
- Senecio smithianus Cabrera
- Senecio smithii DC.
- Senecio smithioides Cabrera
- Senecio snowdenii Hutch.
- Senecio sociorum Bolus
- Senecio socompae Cabrera
- Senecio solandri Allan
- Senecio soldanella A.Gray
- Senecio sophioides DC.
- Senecio sorianoi Cabrera
- Senecio sororius C.Jeffrey
- Senecio sotikensis S.Moore
- Senecio soukupii Cuatrec.
- Senecio spanomerus I.Thomps.
- Senecio spartareus S.Moore
- Senecio spartioides Torr. & A.Gray
- Senecio spathiphyllus Franch.
- Senecio spathulatus A.Rich.
- Senecio speciosissimus J.C.Manning & Goldblatt
- Senecio speciosus Willd.
- Senecio spegazzinii Cabrera
- Senecio sphaerocephalus Greene
- Senecio spinosus DC.
- Senecio spiraeifolius Thunb.
- Senecio spribillei W.A.Weber
- Senecio squalidus L.
- Senecio squarrosus A.Rich.
- Senecio stauntonii DC.
- Senecio stella-purpurea V.R.Clark, J.D.Vidal & N.P.Barker
- Senecio steparius Cabrera
- Senecio sterquilinus Ornduff
- Senecio steudelii Sch.Bip. ex A.Rich.
- Senecio stigophlebius Baker
- Senecio stoechadiformis DC.
- Senecio stokesii F.Br.
- Senecio striatifolius DC.
- Senecio strictifolius Hiern
- Senecio subarnicoides Cabrera
- Senecio subauriculatus Greenm.
- Senecio subauritus Phil.
- Senecio subcanescens (DC.) Compton
- Senecio subcoriaceus Schltr.
- Senecio subculcitioides Cuatrec.
- Senecio subdentatus Ledeb.
- Senecio subdiscoideus Sch.Bip.
- Senecio subfractiflexus C.Jeffrey
- Senecio sublutescens Cuatrec.
- Senecio submontanus Hilliard & B.L.Burtt
- Senecio × subnebrodensis Simonk.
- Senecio subnivalis Ajani, Noroozi & B.Nord.
- Senecio subpanduratus O.Hoffm.
- Senecio subpubescens Cabrera
- Senecio subrubriflorus O.Hoffm.
- Senecio subruncinatus Greenm.
- Senecio subsessilis Oliv. & Hiern
- Senecio subsinuatus DC.
- Senecio subulatus D.Don ex Hook. & Arn.
- Senecio subumbellatus Phil.
- Senecio sulinicus Cabrera
- Senecio sumarae Deflers
- Senecio sumatranus Martelli
- Senecio sundti Phil.
- Senecio superparamensis Sklenář
- Senecio supremus Cuatrec.
- Senecio sylvaticus L.
- Senecio syringifolius O.Hoffm.
- Senecio szyszylowiczii Hieron.

== T ==
- Senecio tabulicola Baker
- Senecio tacorensis Cabrera
- Senecio tacuaremboensis Arechav.
- Senecio talquinus Phil.
- Senecio tamoides DC.
- Senecio tanacetopsis Hilliard
- Senecio tandilensis Cabrera
- Senecio taraxacoides Greene
- Senecio tarijensis Cabrera
- Senecio tasmanicus I.Thomps.
- Senecio tauricola V.A.Matthews
- Senecio tehuelches (Speg.) Cabrera
- Senecio teixeirae Torre
- Senecio telekii O.Hoffm.
- Senecio telmateius Hilliard
- Senecio × telonensis Albert
- Senecio tenellus DC.
- Senecio teneriffae Sch.Bip. ex Bolle
- Senecio tenuicaulis Sch.Bip. ex Klatt
- Senecio tenuiflorus (DC.) Sch.Bip.
- Senecio tenuifolius Burm.f.
- Senecio tenuisagittatus Cuatrec.
- Senecio tephrosioides Turcz.
- Senecio tergolanatus Cuatrec.
- Senecio tergopurpureus Cuatrec.
- Senecio tetrandrus
- Senecio thamathuensis Hilliard
- Senecio thapsoides DC.
- Senecio theresiae Hoffm.
- Senecio thianschanicus Regel & Schmalh.
- Senecio thunbergii Harv.
- Senecio ticsanicus Montesinos & Trinidad
- Senecio tilcarensis Cabrera
- Senecio timidus Cuatrec.
- Senecio tinctolobus I.M.Johnst.
- Senecio tocomarensis Cabrera & Zardini
- Senecio toconaoensis J.Calvo& A.Moreira
- Senecio toroanus Cabrera
- Senecio torrehuasensis Cuatrec.
- Senecio torticaulis Merxm.
- Senecio tortuosus DC.
- Senecio townsendii Greenm.
- Senecio trachylaenus Harv.
- Senecio trachyphyllus Schltr.
- Senecio trafulensis Cabrera
- Senecio transiens (Rouy) Jeanm.
- Senecio transmarinus S.Moore
- Senecio triactinus S.Moore
- Senecio triangularis Hook.
- Senecio tricephalus Kuntze
- Senecio trichocaulon Baker
- Senecio trichocodon Baker
- Senecio tricuspidatus Hook. & Arn.
- Senecio tricuspis Franch.
- Senecio trifidus Hook. & Arn.
- Senecio trifurcatus (G.Forst.) Less.
- Senecio trifurcifolius Hieron.
- Senecio trilobus L.
- Senecio triodon Phil.
- Senecio triodontiphyllus C.Jeffrey
- Senecio tripinnatifidus Reiche
- Senecio triplinervius DC.
- Senecio triqueter Less.
- Senecio tristis Phil.
- Senecio troncosii Phil.
- Senecio tsaratananensis Humbert
- Senecio tschabanicus K.Koch
- Senecio tuberculatus Ali
- Senecio tubicapillosus Cuatrec.
- Senecio tucumanensis Cabrera
- Senecio tugelensis J.M.Wood & M.S.Evans
- Senecio tulinensis S.S.Ying
- Senecio tweediei Hook. & Arn.
- Senecio tysonii MacOwan

== U ==
- Senecio ulopterus Thell.
- Senecio umbellatus L.
- Senecio umbricola Cron & B.Nord.
- Senecio umbrosus Waldst. & Kit.
- Senecio umgeniensis Thell.
- Senecio unionis Sch.Bip. ex A.Rich.
- Senecio urophyllus Conrath
- Senecio urundensis S.Moore
- Senecio uspallatensis Hook. & Arn.

== V ==
- Senecio × vaccarii Fiori
- Senecio vaginatus Hook. & Arn.
- Senecio vagus F.Muell.
- Senecio vaingaindrani Scott Elliot
- Senecio variabilis Sch.Bip.
- Senecio varicosus L.f.
- Senecio varvarcensis Cabrera
- Senecio vegetus (Wedd.) Cabrera
- Senecio venosus Harv.
- Senecio ventanensis Cabrera
- Senecio verbascifolius Burm.f.
- Senecio vernalis Waldst. & Kit.
- Senecio vernus Biv.
- Senecio vervoorstii Cabrera
- Senecio vestitus P.J.Bergius
- Senecio vicinus S.Moore
- Senecio viejoanus B.L.Turner
- Senecio villifructus Hilliard
- Senecio vimineus DC.
- Senecio violifolius Cabrera
- Senecio vira-vira Hieron.
- Senecio virens Phil.
- Senecio viridilacus Cabrera
- Senecio viridis Phil.
- Senecio × viscidulus Scheele
- Senecio viscosissimus Colla
- Senecio viscosus L.
- Senecio vitellinoides Merxm.
- Senecio vittarifolius Bojer ex DC.
- Senecio voigtii van Jaarsv.
- Senecio volcanicola C.Jeffrey
- Senecio volckmannii Phil.
- Senecio vulcanicus Boiss.
- Senecio vulgaris L.
- Senecio vulneraria DC.

== W ==
- Senecio wairauensis Belcher
- Senecio warnockii Shinners
- Senecio warrenensis I.Thomps.
- Senecio warszewiczii A.Braun & C.D.Bouché
- Senecio waterbergensis S.Moore
- Senecio weberbaueri Cuatrec.
- Senecio websteri Hook.f.
- Senecio wedglacialis Cuatrec.
- Senecio werdermannii Greenm.
- Senecio westermanii Dusén
- Senecio wightii (DC.) Benth. ex C.B.Clarke
- Senecio windhoekensis Merxm.
- Senecio wittebergensis Compton
- Senecio woodii J.Calvo
- Senecio woodsonianus Cuatrec.
- Senecio wootonii Greene

== X ==
- Senecio xenostylus O.Hoffm.
- Senecio xerophilus Phil.

== Y ==
- Senecio yalae Cabrera
- Senecio yauyensis Cabrera
- Senecio yungningensis Hand.-Mazz.
- Senecio yurensis Rusby

== Z ==
- Senecio zapahuirensis Martic. & Quezada
- Senecio zapalae Cabrera
- Senecio zeylanicus DC.
- Senecio zosterifolius Hook. & Arn.

== Some former species ==
- Senecio actinella Greene → Packera actinella
- Senecio amygdalifolius F.Muell. → Lordhowea amygdalifolia
- Senecio kleiniiformis Suess. → × Senecurio kleiniiformis
- Senecio nivalis (Kunth) Cuatrec. → Culcitium nivale
- Senecio pectinatus DC. → Scapisenecio pectinatus
- Senecio peregrinus Griseb. → Dendrophorbium peregrinum
- Senecio sarcoides C.Jeffrey → Curio corymbifer
- Senecio tropaeolifolius MacOwan ex F.Muell. → Senecio oxyriifolius subsp. tropaeolifolius
- Senecio velleioides A.Cunn. ex DC. → Lordhowea velleioides
