= Torticaulis =

Torticaulis may refer to:

- Dioscorea torticaulis, a species of the flowering plant genus Dioscorea
- Senecio torticaulis, a species of the genus Senecio, in the sunflower family

== See also ==
- Tortilicaulis, a moss-like plant known from fossils
