= Senecio aquilaris =

Scientific classification
- Kingdom: Plantae
- Clade: Tracheophytes
- Clade: Angiosperms
- Clade: Eudicots
- Clade: Asterids
- Order: Asterales
- Family: Asteraceae
- Genus: Senecio
- Species: S. aquilaris

Binomial name
- Senecio aquilaris Cabrera

Species of flowering plant

Senecio aquilaris is a species of flowering plant in the family Asteraceae. It is native to Argentina and Bolivia.
