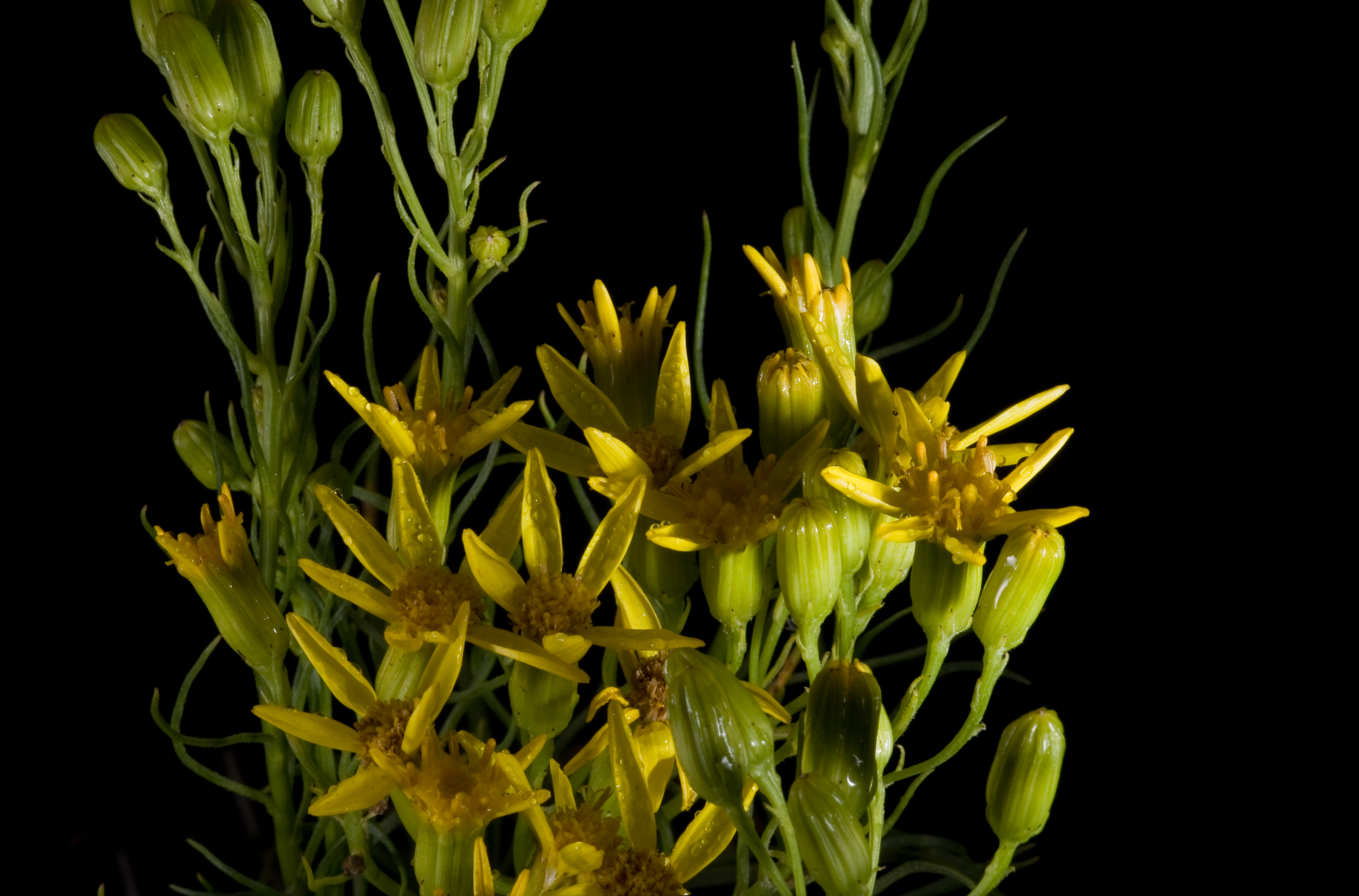

Scientific classification
- Kingdom: Plantae
- Clade: Tracheophytes
- Clade: Angiosperms
- Clade: Eudicots
- Clade: Asterids
- Order: Asterales
- Family: Asteraceae
- Genus: Senecio
- Species: S. blochmaniae

Binomial name
- Senecio blochmaniae Greene

= Senecio blochmaniae =

Species of flowering plant

Senecio blochmaniae is an uncommon species of flowering plant in the aster family known by the common names dune ragwort and Blochman's ragwort. It is endemic to the Central Coast of California, where it is known only from the direct coastline of San Luis Obispo and Santa Barbara Counties. It grows in sand dunes and sandy areas on coastal floodplains. It is a subshrub producing several arching stems often well exceeding a meter tall from a thick taproot. The stems are covered in many leaves, which are linear in shape, thick, and measure up to 12 centimeters long. The lower leaves become dry and curl up. The flower heads are lined by about 13 green-tipped phyllaries. They contain many yellow disc florets and each has usually 8 narrow yellow ray florets about a centimeter long.
