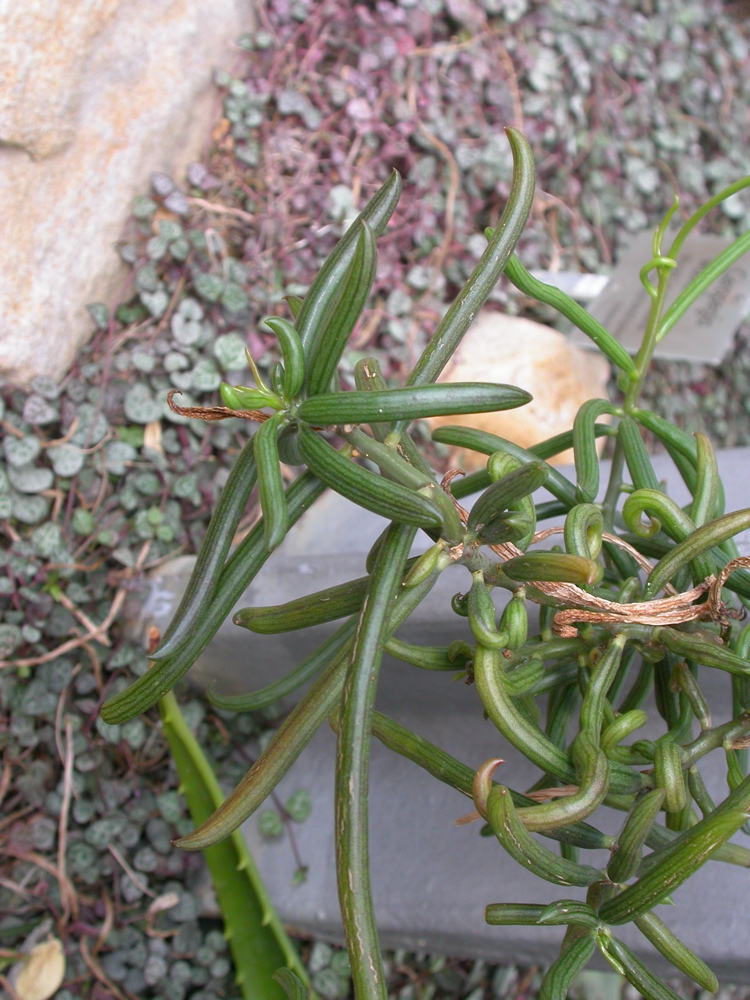

Scientific classification
- Kingdom: Plantae
- Clade: Tracheophytes
- Clade: Angiosperms
- Clade: Eudicots
- Clade: Asterids
- Order: Asterales
- Family: Asteraceae
- Genus: Senecio
- Species: S. antandroi

Binomial name
- Senecio antandroi Scott-Elliot (1891) Sources: FM, IPNI

= Senecio antandroi =

Species of flowering plant

Senecio antandroi is a species of the genus Senecio endemic to Madagascar.
