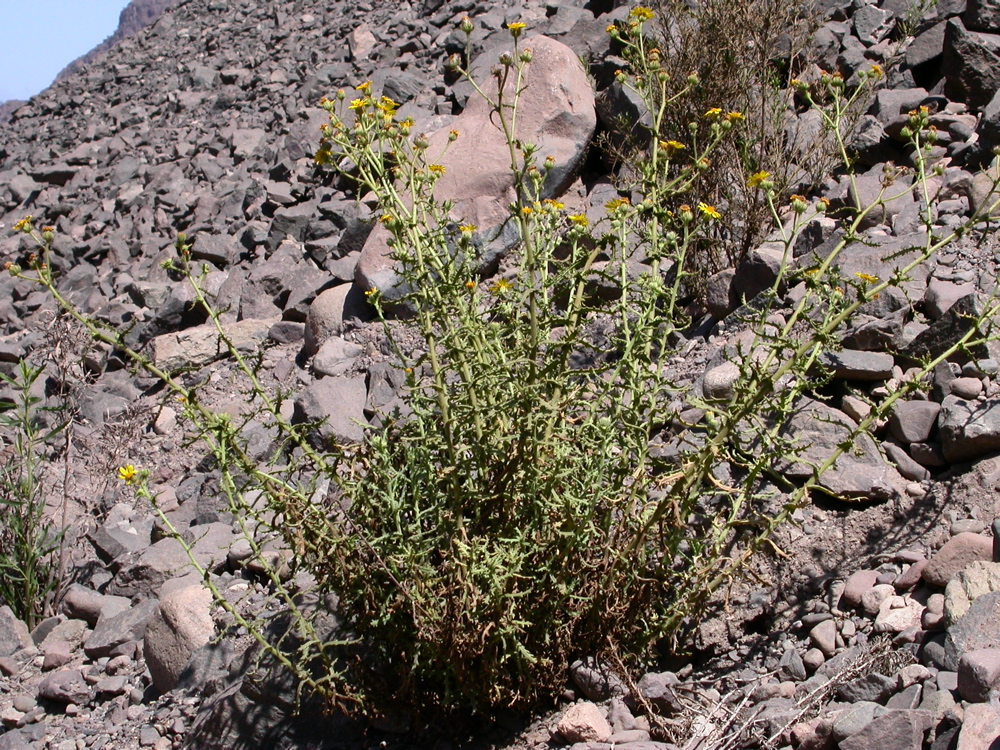

Scientific classification
- Kingdom: Plantae
- Clade: Tracheophytes
- Clade: Angiosperms
- Clade: Eudicots
- Clade: Asterids
- Order: Asterales
- Family: Asteraceae
- Genus: Senecio
- Species: S. murinus

Binomial name
- Senecio murinus Phil. (1894)

= Senecio murinus =

Species of flowering plant

Senecio murinus is a plant species of the family Asteraceae. It occurs in Chile.
