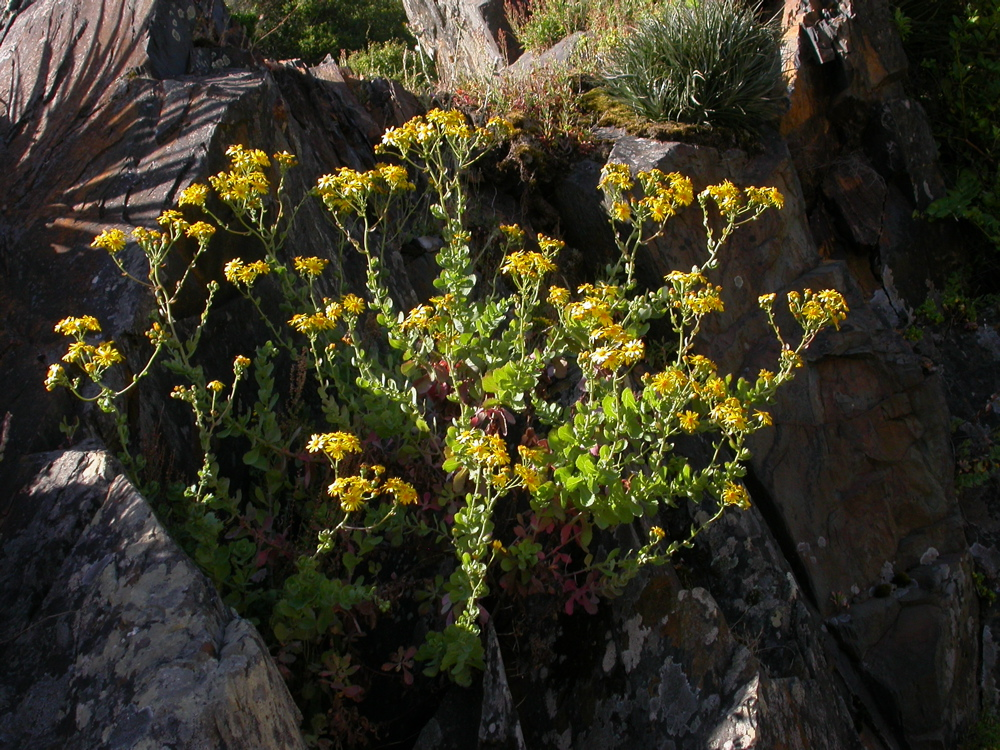

Scientific classification
- Kingdom: Plantae
- Clade: Tracheophytes
- Clade: Angiosperms
- Clade: Eudicots
- Clade: Asterids
- Order: Asterales
- Family: Asteraceae
- Genus: Senecio
- Species: S. nigrescens

Binomial name
- Senecio nigrescens Hook. & Arn. Source: IPNI

= Senecio nigrescens =

Species of flowering plant

Senecio nigrescens is a species of the genus Senecio and family Asteraceae and was first written about in the botanical classic Botany of Beechey's Voyage to the Pacific and Behring's Straits.
