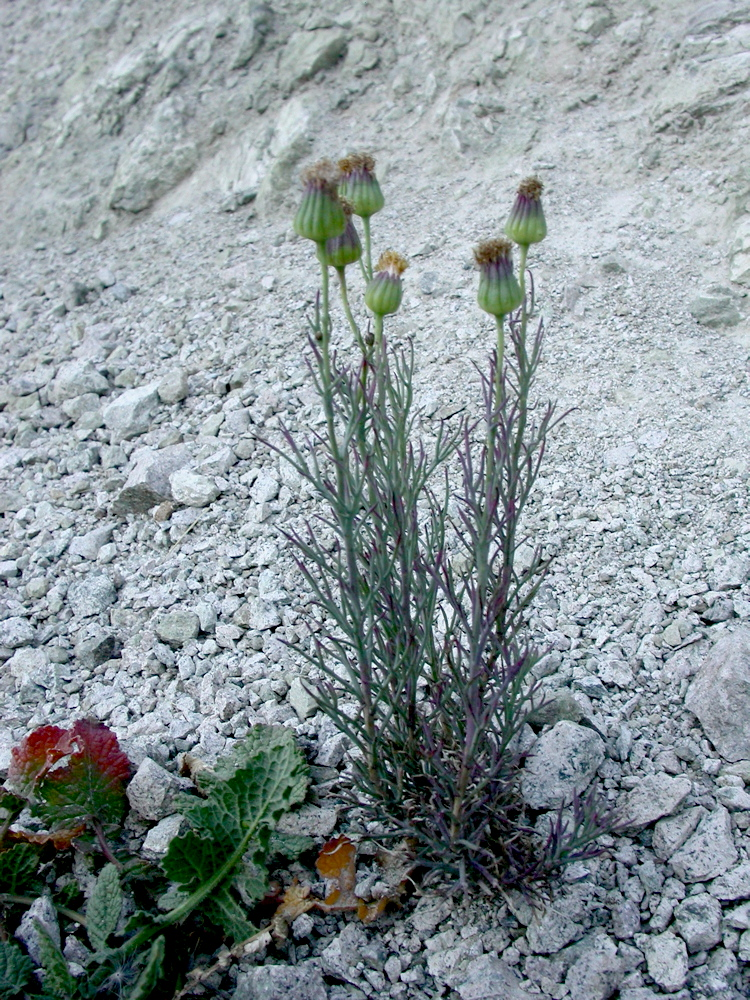

Scientific classification
- Kingdom: Plantae
- Clade: Tracheophytes
- Clade: Angiosperms
- Clade: Eudicots
- Clade: Asterids
- Order: Asterales
- Family: Asteraceae
- Genus: Senecio
- Species: S. tripinnatifidus

Binomial name
- Senecio tripinnatifidus Reiche (1905) Source: IPNI

= Senecio tripinnatifidus =

Species of flowering plant

Senecio tripinnatifidus is a species of the genus Senecio and family Asteraceae and is a native of Chile.
