= Senecio clarkianus =

Scientific classification
- Kingdom: Plantae
- Clade: Tracheophytes
- Clade: Angiosperms
- Clade: Eudicots
- Clade: Asterids
- Order: Asterales
- Family: Asteraceae
- Genus: Senecio
- Species: S. clarkianus

Binomial name
- Senecio clarkianus A.Gray

Species of flowering plant

Senecio clarkianus is a species of flowering plant in the aster family known by the common name Clark's ragwort. It is endemic to the Sierra Nevada of California, where it grows in the moist meadows on the western slopes of the range. It is a perennial herb growing up to 1.2 meters tall from a caudex and fibrous root system. The solitary erect stem is lined evenly with leaves up to about 18 centimeters long, their blades deeply lobed or dissected into narrow, pointed segments. The herbage is hairy to woolly in texture. The inflorescence bears several flower heads which are lined with green-tipped phyllaries. They contain many yellow disc florets and each has usually 8 or 13 narrow yellow ray florets about a centimeter long, sometimes longer.
