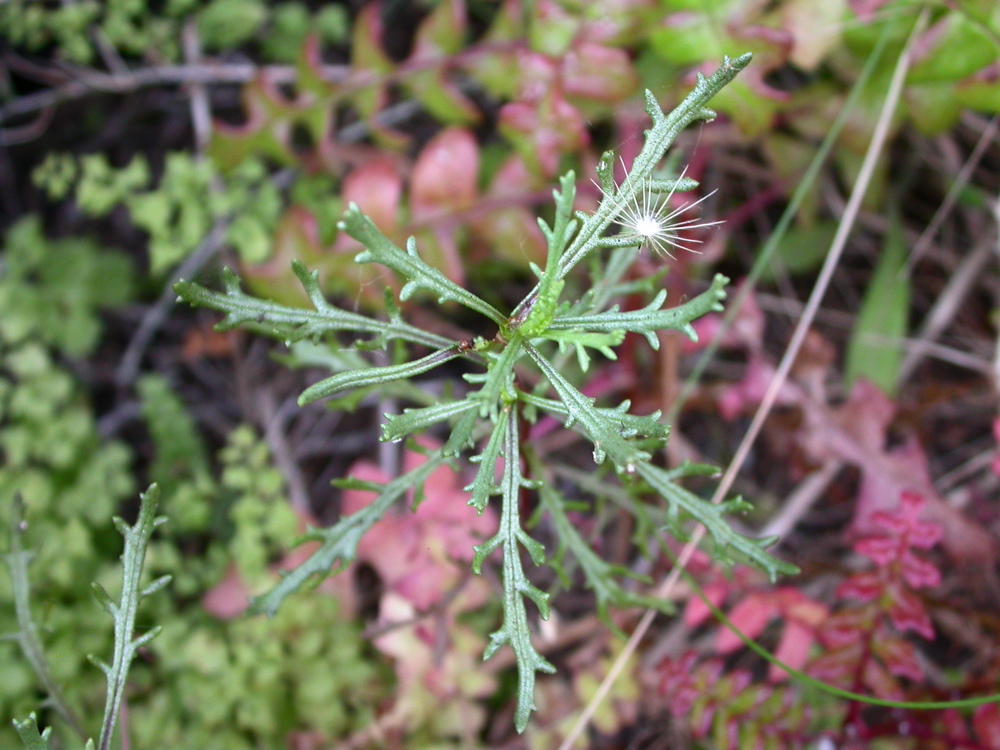

Scientific classification
- Kingdom: Plantae
- Clade: Tracheophytes
- Clade: Angiosperms
- Clade: Eudicots
- Clade: Asterids
- Order: Asterales
- Family: Asteraceae
- Genus: Senecio
- Species: S. viscosissimus

Binomial name
- Senecio viscosissimus Colla

Synonyms
- Senecio glaber Source: IPNI

= Senecio viscosissimus =

Species of flowering plant

Senecio viscosissimus is a species of flowering plant in the genus Senecio and family Asteraceae.
