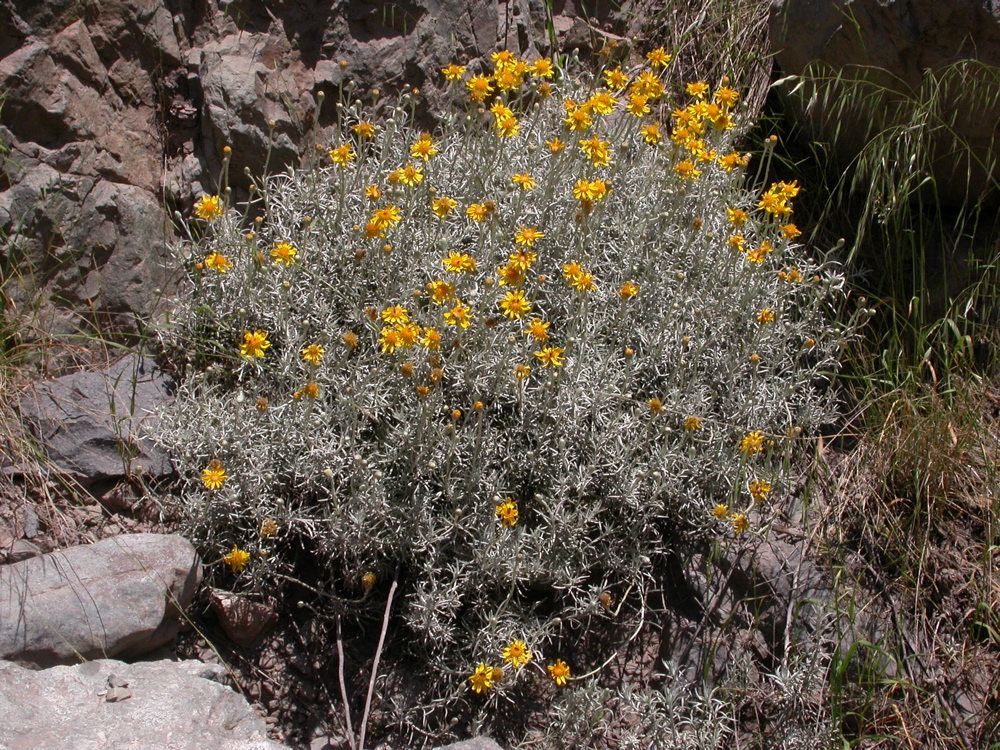

Scientific classification
- Kingdom: Plantae
- Clade: Tracheophytes
- Clade: Angiosperms
- Clade: Eudicots
- Clade: Asterids
- Order: Asterales
- Family: Asteraceae
- Genus: Senecio
- Species: S. chilensis

Binomial name
- Senecio chilensis Less. (1831) Sources: IPNI,

= Senecio chilensis =

Species of flowering plant

Senecio chilensis is a species of the genus Senecio, family Asteraceae and one of the many species of Senecio native to Chile.

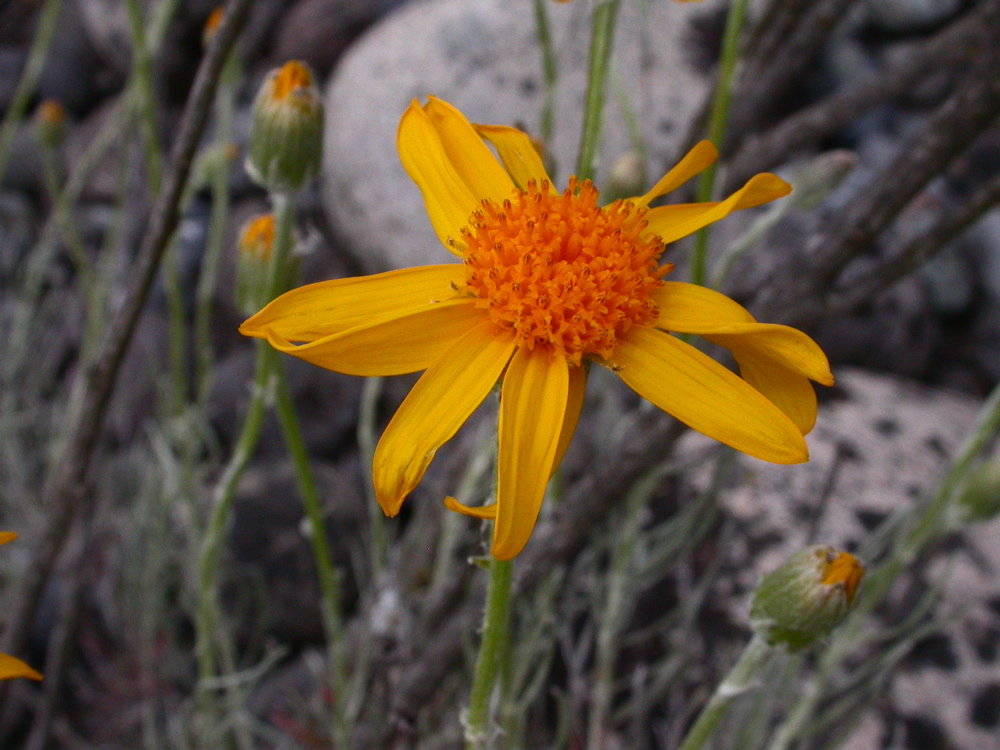
Flower of S. chilensis
