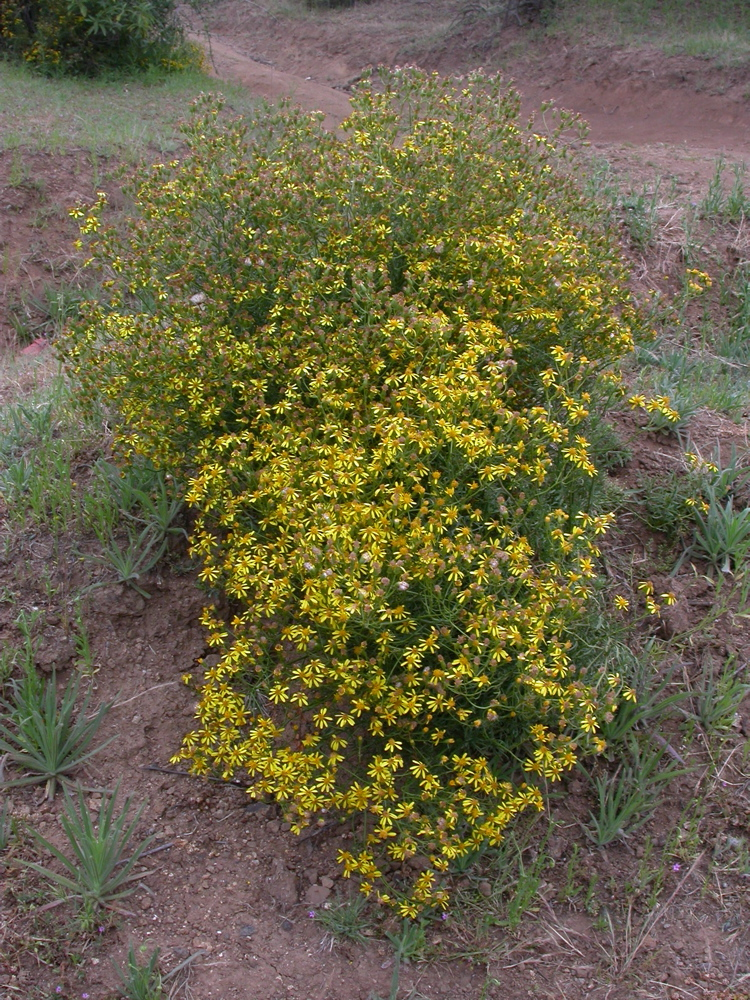

Scientific classification
- Kingdom: Plantae
- Clade: Tracheophytes
- Clade: Angiosperms
- Clade: Eudicots
- Clade: Asterids
- Order: Asterales
- Family: Asteraceae
- Genus: Senecio
- Species: S. invalidus

Binomial name
- Senecio invalidus C.Jeffrey (1992)

Synonyms
- Senecio debilis Source: IPNI

= Senecio invalidus =

Species of flowering plant

Senecio invalidus is a species of the genus Senecio and family Asteraceae.
