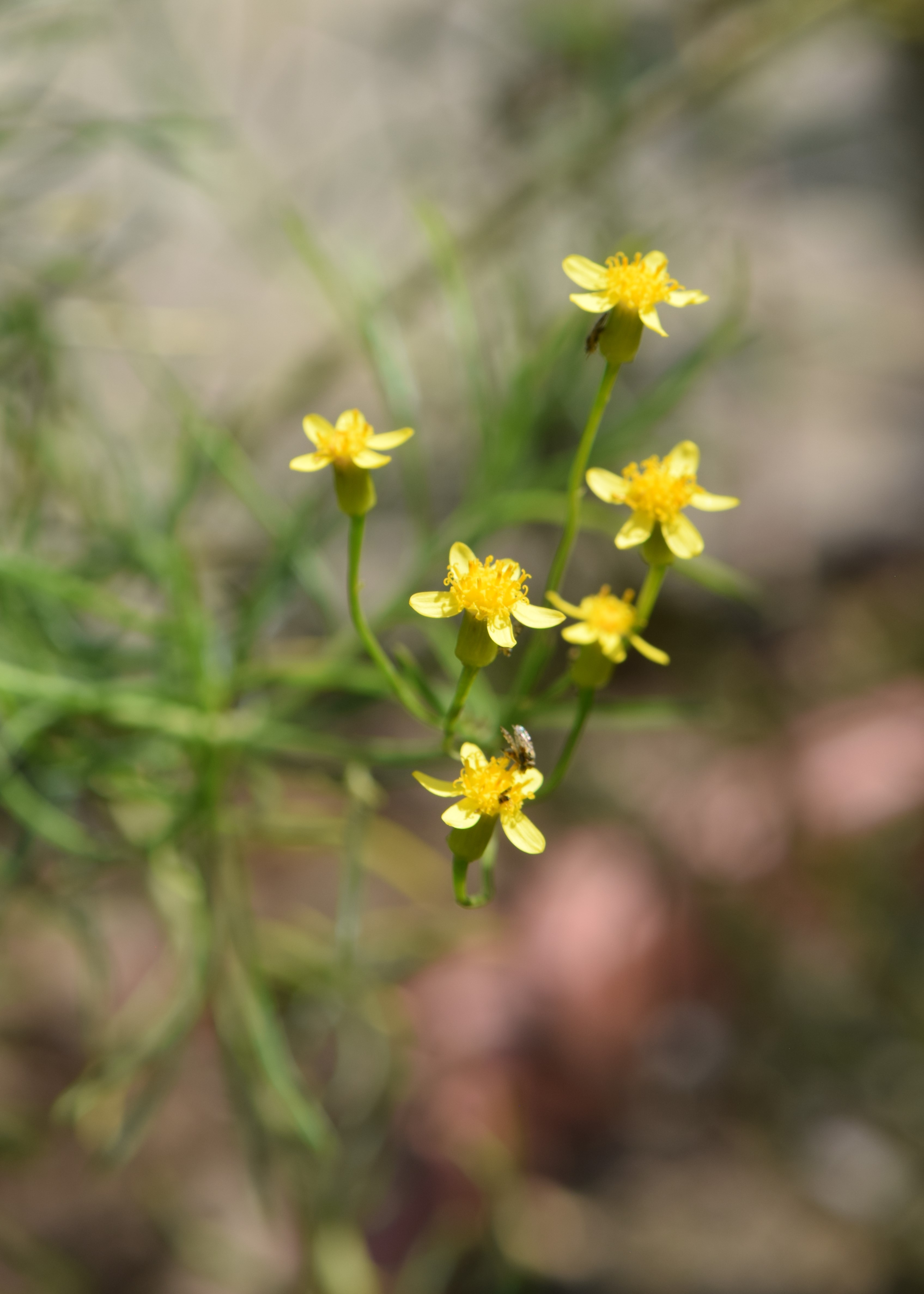

Scientific classification
- Kingdom: Plantae
- Clade: Embryophytes
- Clade: Tracheophytes
- Clade: Angiosperms
- Clade: Eudicots
- Clade: Asterids
- Order: Asterales
- Family: Asteraceae
- Genus: Senecio
- Species: S. malacitanus

Binomial name
- Senecio malacitanus Huter

Synonyms
- Senecio frigidus Steud.; Senecio linifoliaster G.López; Senecio linifolius (L.) L.; Senecio linifolius subsp. linifolius; Senecio linifolius var. linifolius; Senecio longifolius L.; Senecio lythroides Wijnands; Senecio malacitanus subsp. malacitanus; Senecio nevadensis subsp. malacitanus (Huter) Greuter; Senecio odontophyllus Goldblatt & J.C.Manning; Senecio pseudolongifolius Sch.Bip..; Solidago linifolia L.

= Senecio malacitanus =

Species of plant

Senecio malacitanus, also known as Senecio linifolius, is a species of plant from South Africa.

== Description ==
This loosely branched shrub grows up to 1–1.2 m (3.3–3.9 ft) long. The young stems are densely leafy and hey turn grey with age. The leaves are narrow and fleshy. Flowers are present between October and July. They are very small. Yellow disc shaped flowers grow in branched inflorescences. The cylindrical seeds have ribs with short hairs.

== Distribution and habitat ==
This plant is found growing on stony slopes between Humansdorp and the Eastern Cape of South Africa. It is found in a wide variety of habitats, including the Karoo, Albany Thicket, grassland, fynbos and renosterveld.

== Conservation ==
This species is considered to be of least concern by the South African National Biodiversity Institute. It is common and widespread so faces little risk of extinction.
