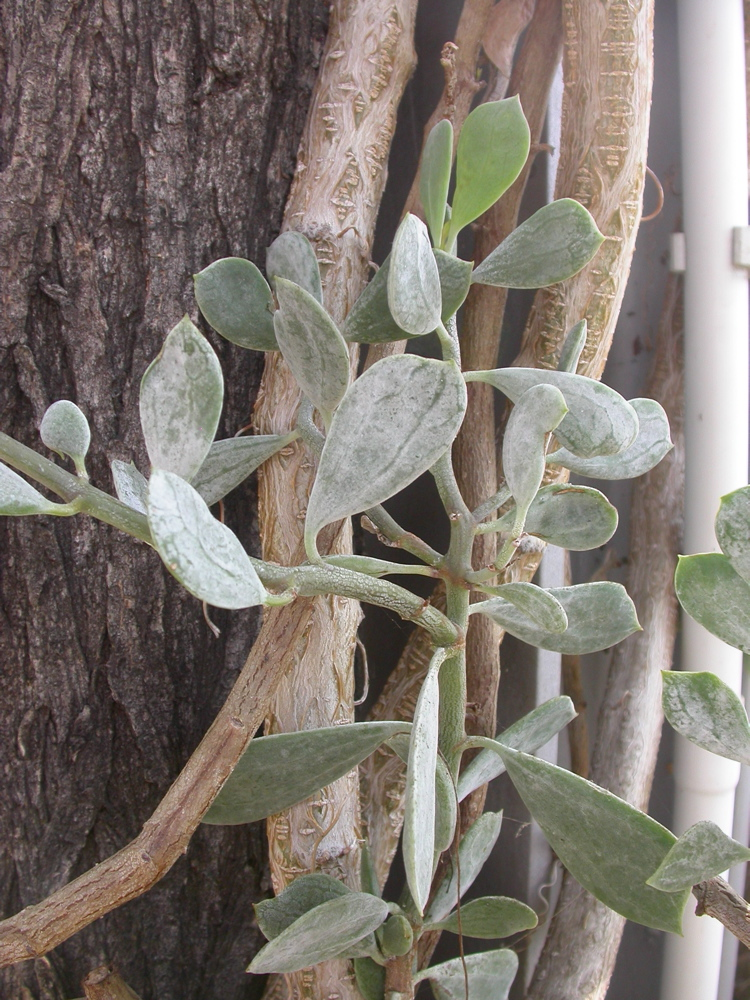

Conservation status
- Near Threatened (IUCN 3.1)

Scientific classification
- Kingdom: Plantae
- Clade: Tracheophytes
- Clade: Angiosperms
- Clade: Eudicots
- Clade: Asterids
- Order: Asterales
- Family: Asteraceae
- Genus: Senecio
- Species: S. cedrorum

Binomial name
- Senecio cedrorum J.Raynal (1968) Sources: IPNI, IUCN

= Senecio cedrorum =

Species of shrub

Senecio cedrorum is a shrub species of the genus Senecio and family Asteraceae and endemic to Madagascar.
