= Senecio pauciradiatus =

Scientific classification
- Kingdom: Plantae
- Clade: Tracheophytes
- Clade: Angiosperms
- Clade: Eudicots
- Clade: Asterids
- Order: Asterales
- Family: Asteraceae
- Genus: Senecio
- Species: S. pauciradiatus

Binomial name
- Senecio pauciradiatus Belcher

Species of herb

Senecio pauciradiatus is an annual herb in the daisy family, Asteraceae. The specific epithet comes from the Latin pauci- (“few”) and radiatus, referring to the flower's relatively few ray florets.

== Description ==
The plant grows up to 25 cm in height and is rarely branched below the inflorescence. The leaves are alternate, 5–6 cm long, 1 cm wide. The flowers occur in cymose inflorescences; they have 4–7 yellow outer florets with 6–8 funnel-shaped disc florets. The fruit has short hairs between brown ribs and is 2.5–3 mm long.

== Distribution and habitat ==
The plant is endemic. to Australia’s subtropical Lord Howe Island in the Tasman Sea. It is very rarely collected and apparently restricted to the island localities of Stevens Point and Middle Beach.
