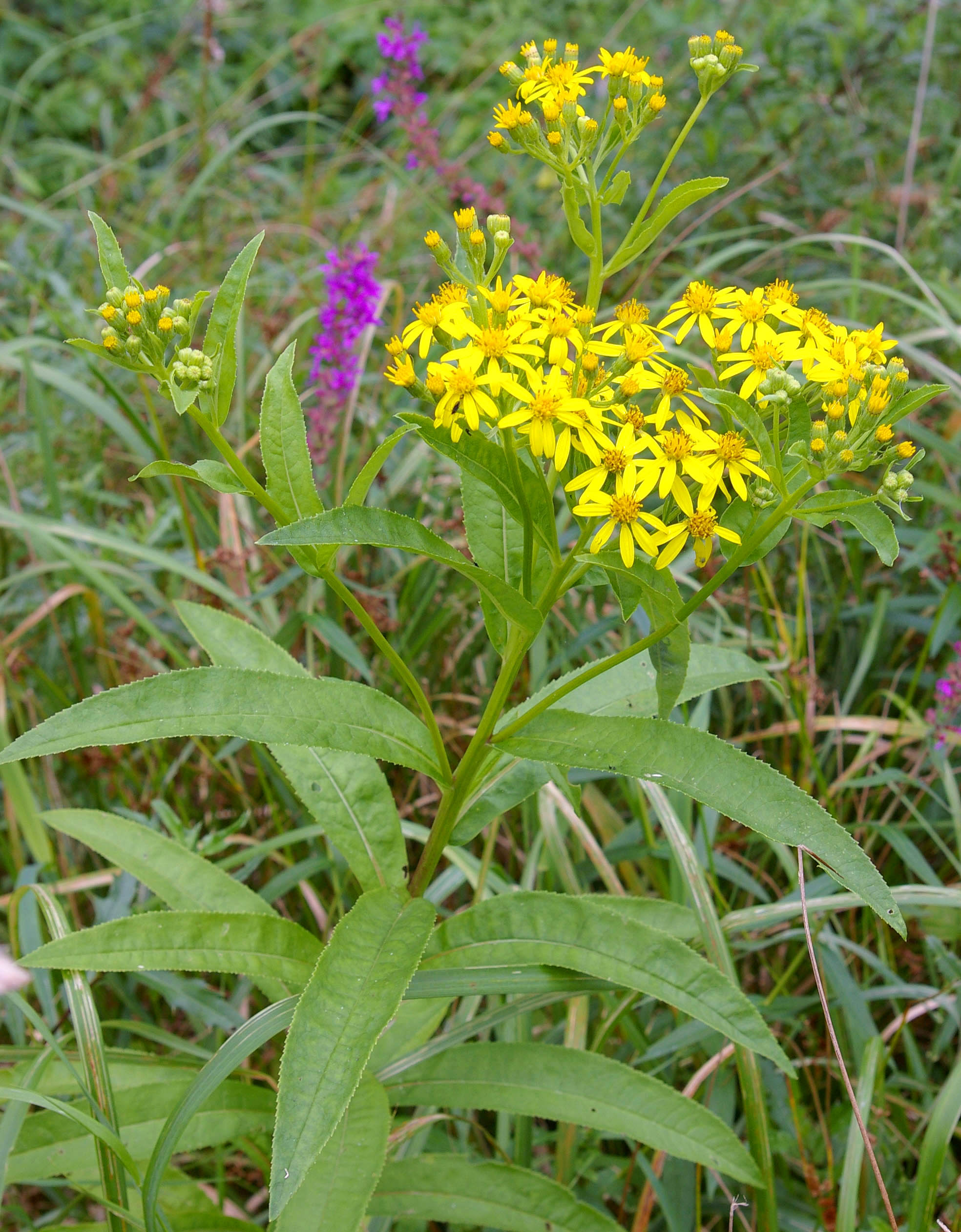

Scientific classification
- Kingdom: Plantae
- Clade: Tracheophytes
- Clade: Angiosperms
- Clade: Eudicots
- Clade: Asterids
- Order: Asterales
- Family: Asteraceae
- Genus: Senecio
- Species: S. sarracenicus

Binomial name
- Senecio sarracenicus L.

= Senecio sarracenicus =

Species of flowering plant

Senecio sarracenicus, the broad-leaved ragwort, is a tall perennial herbaceous flowering plant belonging to the daisy family Asteraceae.
