= Senecio apolobambensis =

Scientific classification
- Kingdom: Plantae
- Clade: Tracheophytes
- Clade: Angiosperms
- Clade: Eudicots
- Clade: Asterids
- Order: Asterales
- Family: Asteraceae
- Genus: Senecio
- Species: S. apolobambensis

Binomial name
- Senecio apolobambensis Cabrera

Species of flowering plant

Senecio apolobambensis is a species of Senecio in the family Asteraceae. It is native to Bolivia.
