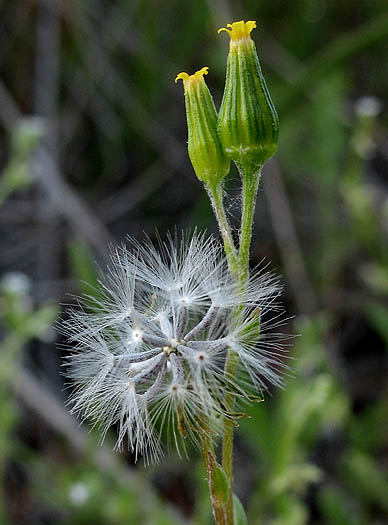

Scientific classification
- Kingdom: Plantae
- Clade: Tracheophytes
- Clade: Angiosperms
- Clade: Eudicots
- Clade: Asterids
- Order: Asterales
- Family: Asteraceae
- Genus: Senecio
- Species: S. aphanactis

Binomial name
- Senecio aphanactis Greene

= Senecio aphanactis =

Species of flowering plant

Senecio aphanactis, known by the common names chaparral ragwort, rayless ragwort, and California groundsel, is a species of flowering plant in the aster family.

== Distribution ==
The annual herb is native to California as far north as the San Francisco Bay Area and south into Baja California.

It occurs in dry coastal areas, particularly coastal sage scrub, foothill oak woodland, and alkali flats.

== Description ==
Senecio aphanactisgenerally grows 10 to 20 centimeters high from a small taproot. The plant is mostly hairless, but the upper parts, such as the inflorescence, may have woolly hairs.

The leaves are linear or lance-shaped, usually with lobed edges, and measure 2 to 4 centimeters long. They sometimes clasp the stem at the bases.

The flower head is urn-shaped and covered in phyllaries. The head opens slightly at the top, revealing many yellow disc florets and sometimes one or more tiny yellow ray florets, although these may be absent. The fruit is a long, thin achene coated in ashy gray hairs and tipped with a pappus of long, white bristles.
