= Senecio argutus =

Scientific classification
- Kingdom: Plantae
- Clade: Tracheophytes
- Clade: Angiosperms
- Clade: Eudicots
- Clade: Asterids
- Order: Asterales
- Family: Asteraceae
- Genus: Senecio
- Species: S. argutus

Binomial name
- Senecio argutus Kunth

Species of plant

Senecio argutus is a species of flowering plant in the family Asteraceae, native to Mexico. It was first described by Carl Sigismund Kunth in 1818.
