= Senecio infirmus =

Scientific classification
- Kingdom: Plantae
- Clade: Tracheophytes
- Clade: Angiosperms
- Clade: Eudicots
- Clade: Asterids
- Order: Asterales
- Family: Asteraceae
- Genus: Senecio
- Species: S. infirmus

Binomial name
- Senecio infirmus C.Jeffrey

Synonyms
- Senecio debilis Harv.; Senecio linariifolius Drège; Senecio linariifolius Drège ex Harv. & Sond.; Senecio paniculatus Drège; Senecio paniculatus Drège ex Harv. & Sond.

South African plant species

Senecio infirmus is a species of plant from South Africa.

== Description ==
This perennial subshrub has narrow, hairless leaves. Yellow flowerheads are borne on long filiform stalks. Each has 10-12 rays and 18-20 bracts. The fruits are achenes (dry fruits containing a single seed). They are hairy.

== Distribution ==
This plant grows in the Western Cape and Eastern Cape of South Africa.

== Conservation ==
There is currently insufficient evidence to assess this species risk of extinction.
