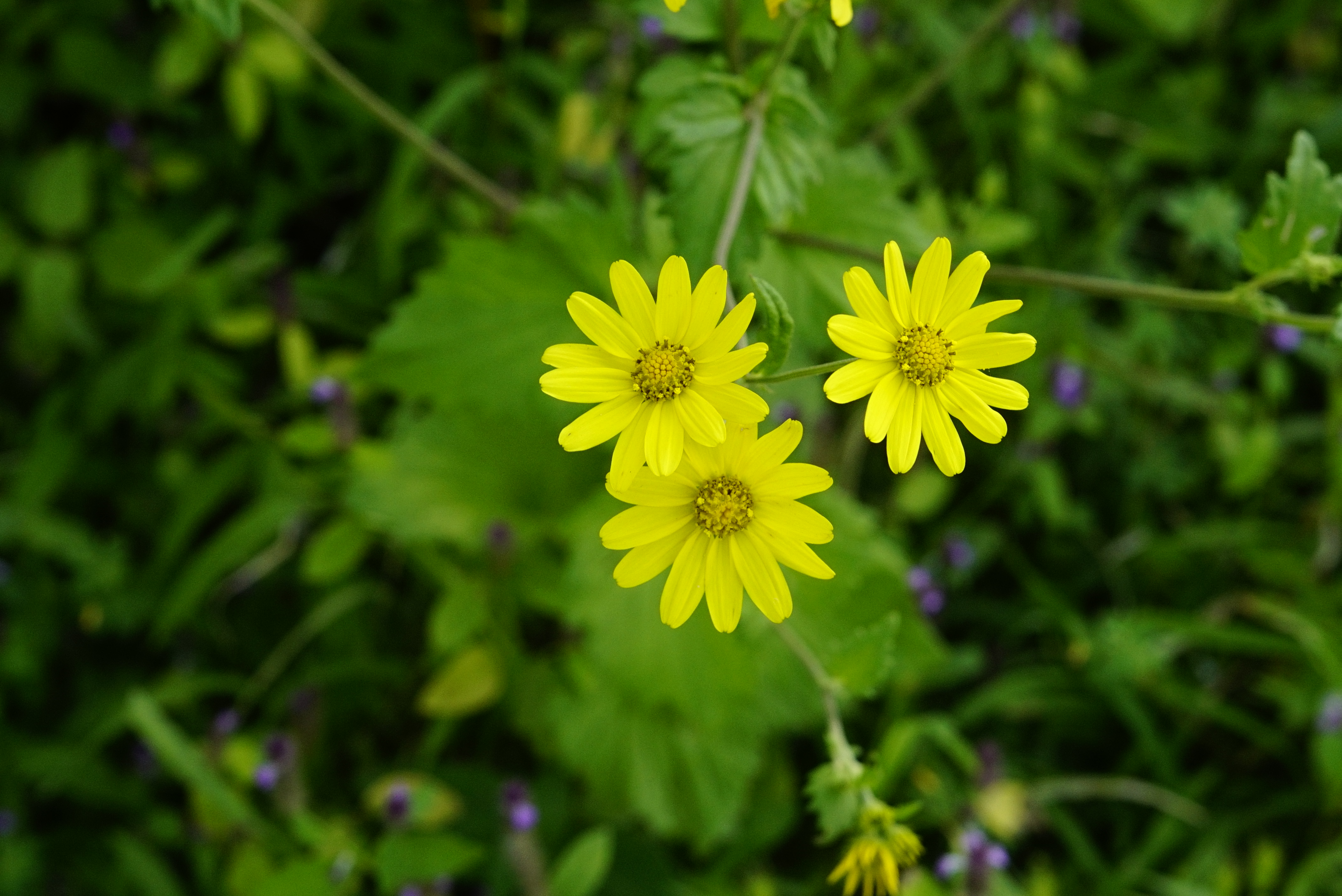

Scientific classification
- Kingdom: Plantae
- Clade: Tracheophytes
- Clade: Angiosperms
- Clade: Eudicots
- Clade: Asterids
- Order: Asterales
- Family: Asteraceae
- Genus: Senecio
- Species: S. bombayensis

Binomial name
- Senecio bombayensis Balakr.

= Senecio bombayensis =

Species of flowering plant

Senecio bombayensis, commonly known as the sonki, is an annual plant of the genus Senecio and family Asteraceae. It lives in the Western Ghats and can grow to be 30–100 cm (12–39 in) high.
