= Senecio luzoniensis =

Scientific classification
- Kingdom: Plantae
- Clade: Tracheophytes
- Clade: Angiosperms
- Clade: Eudicots
- Clade: Asterids
- Order: Asterales
- Family: Asteraceae
- Genus: Senecio
- Species: S. luzoniensis

Binomial name
- Senecio luzoniensis Merr. Source: IPNI

Species of flowering plant

Senecio luzoniensis is a species of the genus Senecio and family Asteraceae and endemic to the Philippines.
