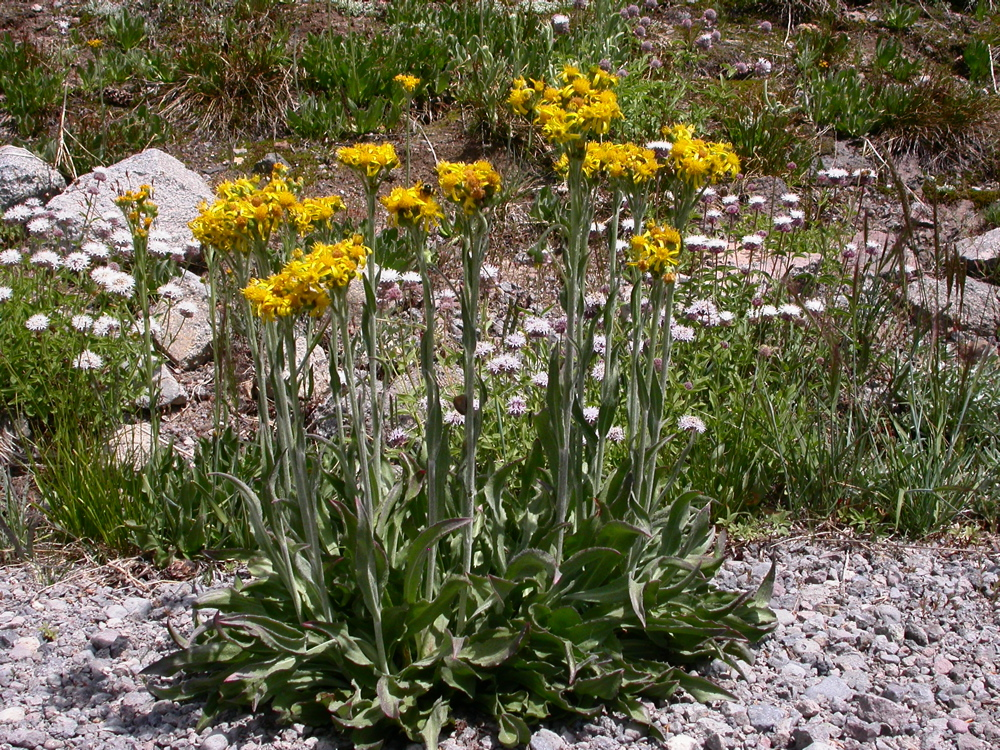

Scientific classification
- Kingdom: Plantae
- Clade: Tracheophytes
- Clade: Angiosperms
- Clade: Eudicots
- Clade: Asterids
- Order: Asterales
- Family: Asteraceae
- Genus: Senecio
- Species: S. scorzonella

Binomial name
- Senecio scorzonella Greene

Synonyms
- Senecio covillei Source: IPNI, Calflora

= Senecio scorzonella =

Species of flowering plant

Senecio scorzonella, known by the common name Sierra ragwort, is a species of the genus Senecio and family Asteraceae which is native to California and Nevada. It grows in the southernmost Cascade Range, the Sierra Nevada, and the White Mountains.
