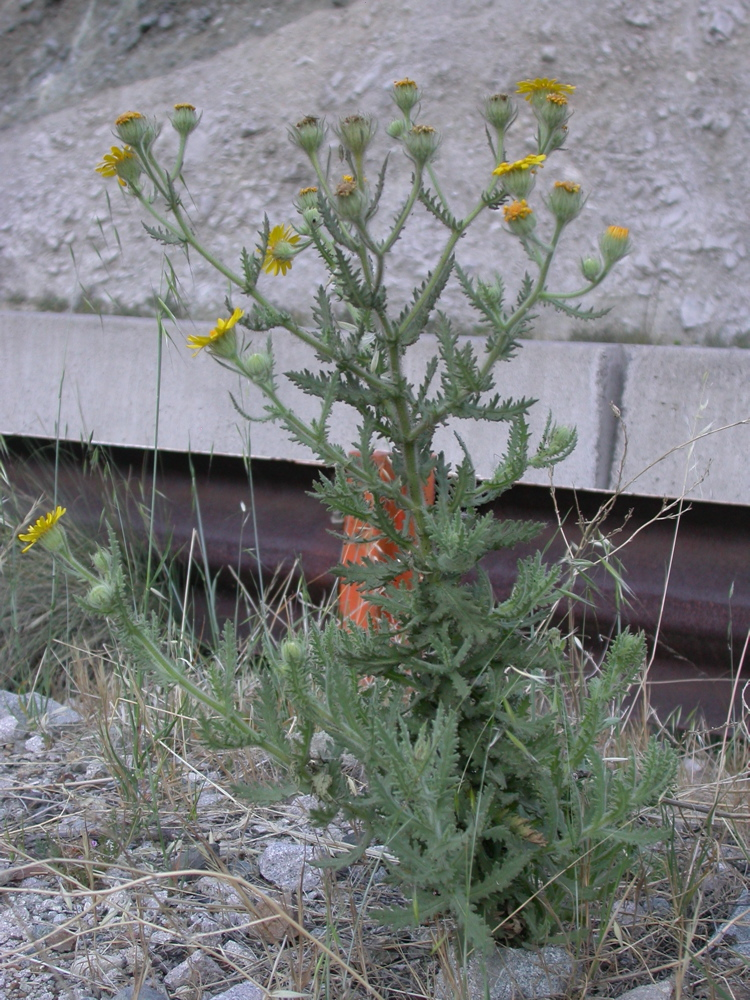

Scientific classification
- Kingdom: Plantae
- Clade: Tracheophytes
- Clade: Angiosperms
- Clade: Eudicots
- Clade: Asterids
- Order: Asterales
- Family: Asteraceae
- Genus: Senecio
- Species: S. adenotrichius

Binomial name
- Senecio adenotrichius DC. Source: IPNI

= Senecio adenotrichius =

Species of flowering plant

Senecio adenotrichius is a species of the genus Senecio. It is native to Chile, and common on disturbed land there.

It is an invasive plant species in the United States.
