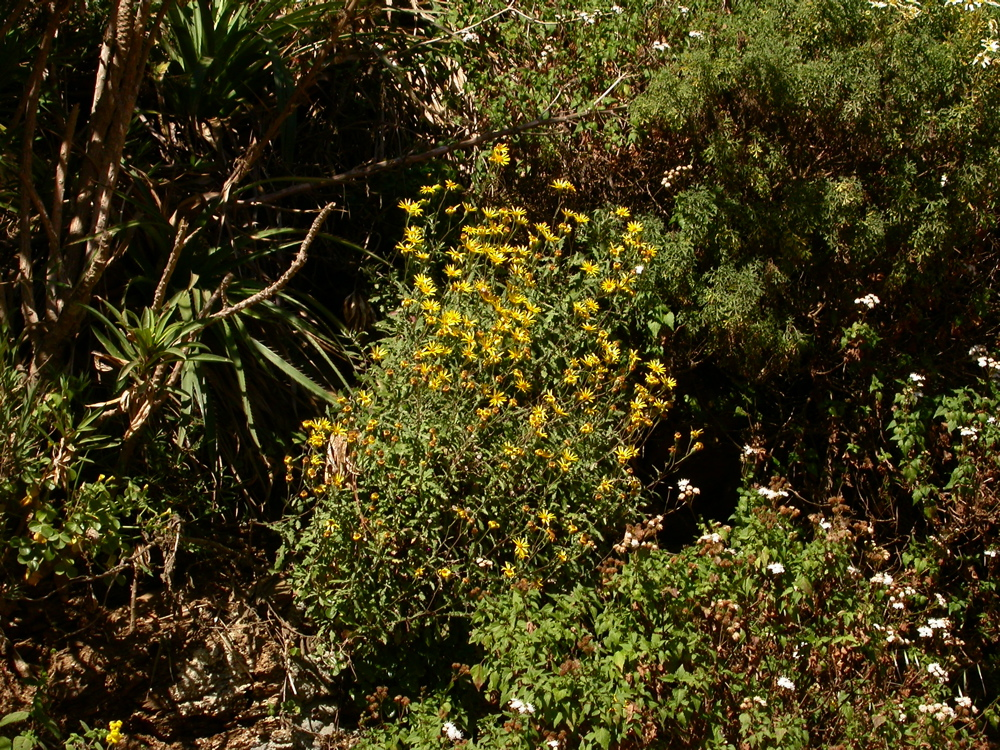

Scientific classification
- Kingdom: Plantae
- Clade: Tracheophytes
- Clade: Angiosperms
- Clade: Eudicots
- Clade: Asterids
- Order: Asterales
- Family: Asteraceae
- Genus: Senecio
- Species: S. haloragis

Binomial name
- Senecio haloragis J.Rémy Source: IPNI

= Senecio haloragis =

Species of flowering plant

Senecio haloragis is a species of the genus Senecio and family Asteraceae and a native of Chile.

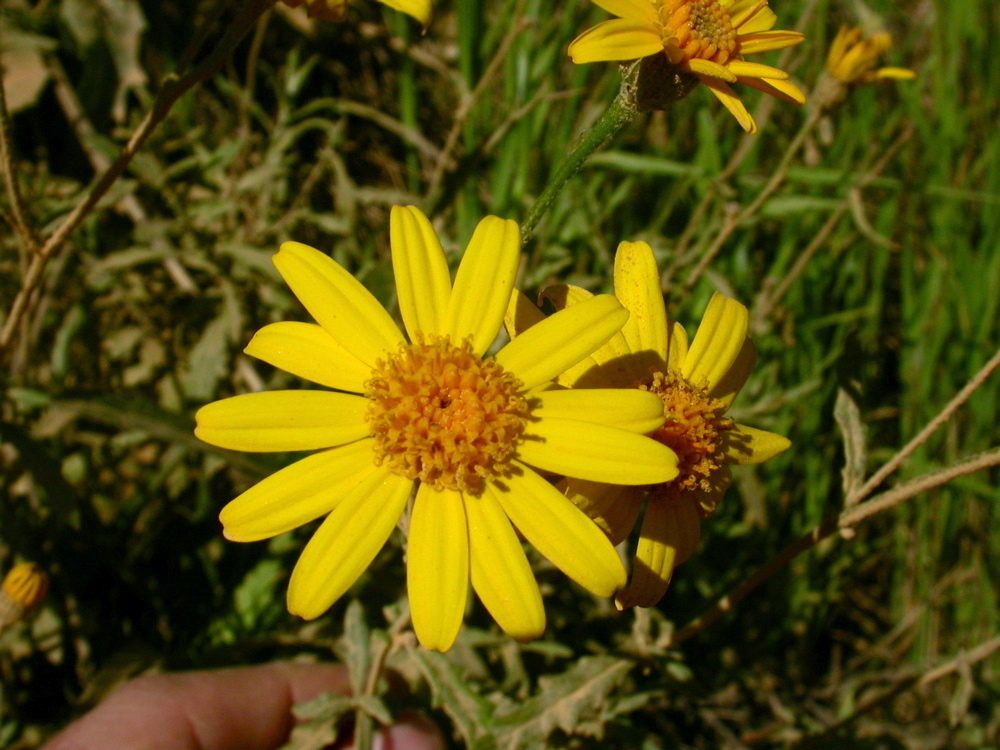
Flower head of S. haloragis
