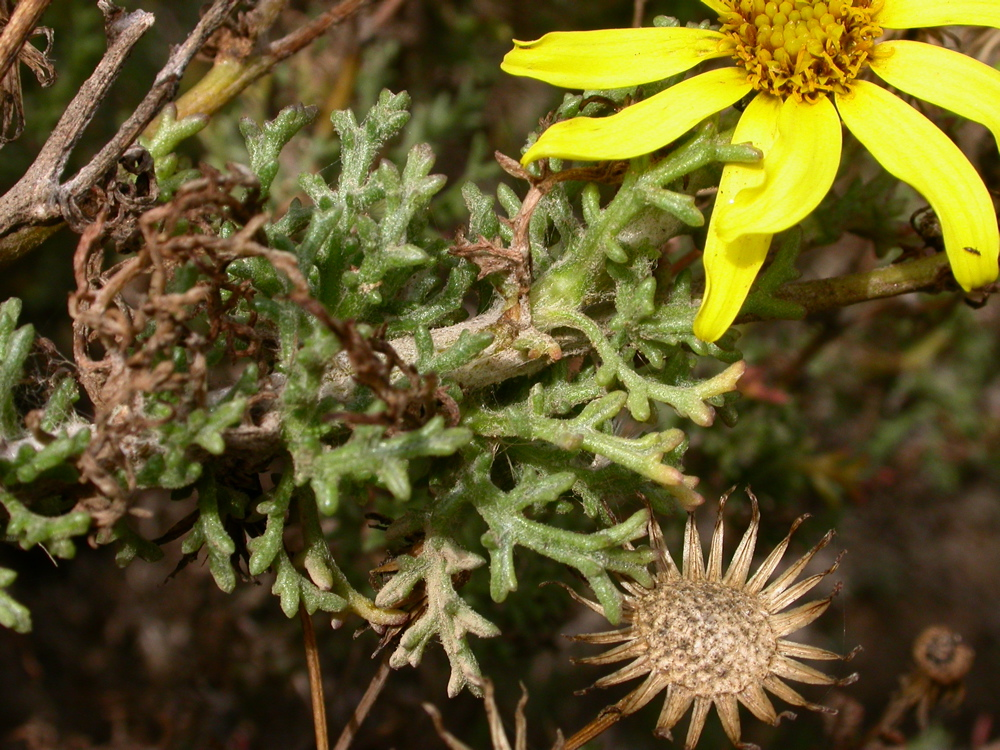

Scientific classification
- Kingdom: Plantae
- Clade: Tracheophytes
- Clade: Angiosperms
- Clade: Eudicots
- Clade: Asterids
- Order: Asterales
- Family: Asteraceae
- Genus: Senecio
- Species: S. bahioides

Binomial name
- Senecio bahioides Hook. & Arn. (1841) Source: IPNI

= Senecio bahioides =

Species of flowering plant

Senecio bahioides is a flowering plant species of the genus Senecio and family Asteraceae. It is a native of Chile.
