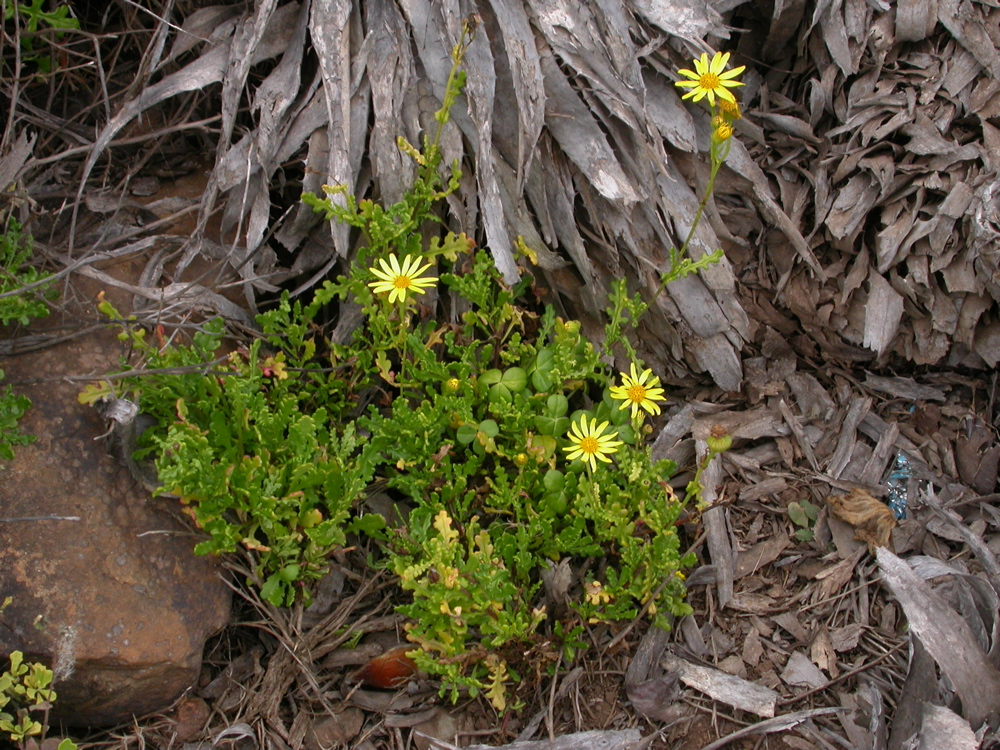

Scientific classification
- Kingdom: Plantae
- Clade: Tracheophytes
- Clade: Angiosperms
- Clade: Eudicots
- Clade: Asterids
- Order: Asterales
- Family: Asteraceae
- Genus: Senecio
- Species: S. glabratus

Binomial name
- Senecio glabratus Hook. & Arn. Source: IPNI

= Senecio glabratus =

Species of flowering plant

Senecio glabratus is a species of the genus Senecio and family Asteraceae.

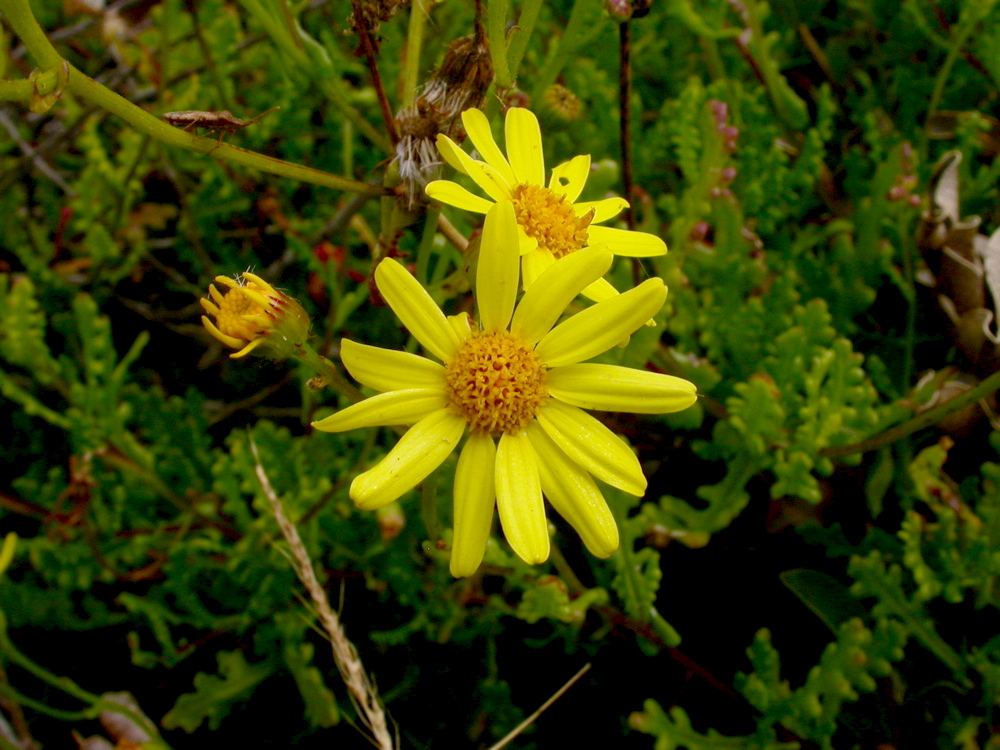
S. glabratus flower head
