= Pelseria =

Scientific classification
- Kingdom: Plantae
- Clade: Tracheophytes
- Clade: Angiosperms
- Clade: Eudicots
- Clade: Asterids
- Order: Asterales
- Family: Asteraceae
- Subfamily: Asteroideae
- Tribe: Senecioneae
- Genus: Pelseria; S.E.Freire & Urtubey
- Species: P. otites

Binomial name
- Pelseria otites (Kunze ex DC.) S.E.Freire & Urtubey, 2026

Synonyms
- Senecio otites Kunze ex DC. Senecio chiloensis Phil. Senecio otites var. auriculus Phil. Senecio otophorus Phil.

Genus of flowering plants

Pelseria is a monotypic genus of flowering plants in the sunflower family, Asteraceae, belonging to the tribe Senecioneae. It was established in 2026 by segregating the species formerly known as Senecio otites from the genus Senecio.

== Description ==
Plants of Pelseria are perennial herbs exhibiting large leaves that are conspicuous petiole, and stipules that possess auricles. The morphology of the style features a subconvex tips that have short sweeping-hairs and resembling those from the genera Dendrophorbium and Hoehnephytum.

== Species ==
The genus contains a single species:

Pelseria otites (Kunze ex DC.) S.E.Freire & Urtubey – the type species of the genus, previously classified as Senecio otites Kunze ex DC.

== Etymology ==
The genus name Pelseria honors Professor Pieter B. Pelser, a Dutch botanist at the University of Canterbury in New Zealand. Dr. Pelser is recognized for his contributions to the phylogeny and taxonomy of the tribe Senecioneae, and is an acknowledged plant biologist of the Philippines through the Co's Digital Flora of the Philippines website.

== Distribution and habitat ==
Pelseria is known only to southern South America, occurring in southern Argentina and Chile at elevations ranging from 600 to 1,300 meters.

== Phylogeny ==
Molecular evidence from nuclear and plastid DNA sequences places Pelseria in a clade with Graphistylis dichroa, Hoehnephytum trixoides, Dendrophorbium bomanii, and Arbelaezaster ellsworthii. This phylogenetic position supports its segregation from Senecio.
