= Dendrophorbium balsapampae =

Conservation status
- Endangered (IUCN 3.1)

Scientific classification
- Kingdom: Plantae
- Clade: Tracheophytes
- Clade: Angiosperms
- Clade: Eudicots
- Clade: Asterids
- Order: Asterales
- Family: Asteraceae
- Genus: Dendrophorbium
- Species: D. balsapampae

Binomial name
- Dendrophorbium balsapampae (Cuatrec.) B.Nord.

Synonyms
- Senecio balsapampae Cuatrec.

Species of flowering plant

Dendrophorbium balsapampae is a species of flowering plant in the family Asteraceae. It is native to Colombia and Ecuador. Its natural habitat is subtropical or tropical moist montane forests. It is threatened by habitat loss.
