= Gynoxys campii =

Conservation status
- Endangered (IUCN 3.1)

Scientific classification
- Kingdom: Plantae
- Clade: Tracheophytes
- Clade: Angiosperms
- Clade: Eudicots
- Clade: Asterids
- Order: Asterales
- Family: Asteraceae
- Genus: Gynoxys
- Species: G. campii

Binomial name
- Gynoxys campii Cuatrec.

Species of flowering plant

Gynoxys campii is a species of flowering plant in the family Asteraceae. It is found only in Ecuador. Its natural habitats are subtropical or tropical high-elevation shrubland and subtropical or tropical high-elevation grassland. It is threatened by habitat loss.
