= Pentacalia corazonensis =

Conservation status
- Vulnerable (IUCN 3.1)

Scientific classification
- Kingdom: Plantae
- Clade: Tracheophytes
- Clade: Angiosperms
- Clade: Eudicots
- Clade: Asterids
- Order: Asterales
- Family: Asteraceae
- Genus: Pentacalia
- Species: P. corazonensis

Binomial name
- Pentacalia corazonensis (Hieron.) Cuatrec.

Synonyms
- Pentacalia campii (Cuatrec.) Cuatrec.; Senecio campii Cuatrec.; Senecio corazonensis Hieron. (1900) (basionym)

Species of flowering plant

Pentacalia corazonensis is a species of flowering plant in the family Asteraceae. It is a climber endemic to central Ecuador. Its natural habitats are subtropical or tropical moist montane forests and subtropical or tropical high-elevation shrubland. It is threatened by habitat loss.
