= Brunellia sibundoya =

Conservation status
- Vulnerable (IUCN 2.3)

Scientific classification
- Kingdom: Plantae
- Clade: Tracheophytes
- Clade: Angiosperms
- Clade: Eudicots
- Clade: Rosids
- Order: Oxalidales
- Family: Brunelliaceae
- Genus: Brunellia
- Species: B. sibundoya

Binomial name
- Brunellia sibundoya Cuatrec.

Synonyms
- Brunellia antioquensis (Cuatrec.) Cuatrec.; Brunellia coroicoana Cuatrec.; Brunellia sibundoya subsp. antioquensis Cuatrec.; Brunellia sibundoya subsp. sebastopola Cuatrec.

Species of flowering plant

Brunellia sibundoya is a species of plant in the Brunelliaceae family. It is a tree native to Colombia, Ecuador, Peru, and western Bolivia.

It is used as animal feed, a medicine, for firewood, fuel, and for revegetation.
