= Pentacalia millei =

Conservation status
- Vulnerable (IUCN 3.1)

Scientific classification
- Kingdom: Plantae
- Clade: Tracheophytes
- Clade: Angiosperms
- Clade: Eudicots
- Clade: Asterids
- Order: Asterales
- Family: Asteraceae
- Genus: Pentacalia
- Species: P. millei

Binomial name
- Pentacalia millei (Greenm.) Cuatrec.

Synonyms
- Pentacalia mikanioides J.Calvo; Pentacalia zamorana H.Rob. & Cuatrec.; Senecio millei Greenm. (1938) (basionym)

Species of flowering plant

Pentacalia millei is a species of flowering plant in the family Asteraceae. It is native to southern Ecuador and northern Peru (Cajamarca). Its natural habitats are subtropical or tropical moist montane forests and subtropical or tropical high-elevation grassland. It is threatened by habitat loss.
