= Pentacalia aschersoniana =

Conservation status
- Vulnerable (IUCN 3.1)

Scientific classification
- Kingdom: Plantae
- Clade: Tracheophytes
- Clade: Angiosperms
- Clade: Eudicots
- Clade: Asterids
- Order: Asterales
- Family: Asteraceae
- Genus: Pentacalia
- Species: P. aschersoniana

Binomial name
- Pentacalia aschersoniana (Hieron.) Cuatrec.

Synonyms
- Pentacalia carchiensis (Cuatrec.) Cuatrec.; Senecio aschersonianus Hieron. (1901) (basionym); Senecio carchiensis Cuatrec.

Species of flowering plant

Pentacalia aschersoniana is a species of flowering plant in the family Asteraceae. It is a climber native to Colombia and northern Ecuador. Its natural habitat is subtropical or tropical moist montane forests. It is threatened by habitat loss.
