= Pentacalia andrei =

Scientific classification
- Kingdom: Plantae
- Clade: Tracheophytes
- Clade: Angiosperms
- Clade: Eudicots
- Clade: Asterids
- Order: Asterales
- Family: Asteraceae
- Genus: Pentacalia
- Species: P. andrei

Binomial name
- Pentacalia andrei (Greenm.) Cuatrec.

Synonyms
- Pentacalia lanceolifolia (Cuatrec.) Cuatrec.; Senecio andrei Greenm.; Senecio lanceolifolius Cuatrec.

Species of flowering plant

Pentacalia andrei, synonym Pentacalia lanceolifolia, is a species of flowering plant in the family Asteraceae. It is native to Ecuador and Peru.

== Conservation ==
Pentacalia lanceolifolia was assessed as "vulnerable" for the 2003 IUCN Red List, where it is said to be native only to Ecuador As of April 2023, P. lanceolifolia was regarded as a synonym of Pentacalia andrei, which has a wider distribution. In Ecuador, its natural habitats are described as subtropical or tropical moist montane forests and subtropical or tropical high-altitude shrubland, which are threatened by habitat destruction.
