= Floscaldasia =

Scientific classification
- Kingdom: Plantae
- Clade: Embryophytes
- Clade: Tracheophytes
- Clade: Spermatophytes
- Clade: Angiosperms
- Clade: Eudicots
- Clade: Asterids
- Order: Asterales
- Family: Asteraceae
- Subfamily: Asteroideae
- Tribe: Astereae
- Subtribe: Baccharidinae
- Genus: Floscaldasia; Cuatrec.

Genus of flowering plants

Floscaldasia is a genus of South American flowering plants in the family Asteraceae.

Species

- Floscaldasia azorelloides Sklenář & H.Rob. – Ecuador
- Floscaldasia hypsophila Cuatrec. - Colombia
