= Gynoxys chingualensis =

Conservation status
- Vulnerable (IUCN 3.1)

Scientific classification
- Kingdom: Plantae
- Clade: Tracheophytes
- Clade: Angiosperms
- Clade: Eudicots
- Clade: Asterids
- Order: Asterales
- Family: Asteraceae
- Genus: Gynoxys
- Species: G. chingualensis

Binomial name
- Gynoxys chingualensis H.Rob. & Cuatrec.

Species of flowering plant

Gynoxys chingualensis is a species of flowering plant in the family Asteraceae. It is native to Ecuador and Peru. Its natural habitat is subtropical or tropical high-elevation grassland. It is threatened by habitat loss.
