= Pentacalia hurtadoi =

Conservation status
- Vulnerable (IUCN 3.1)

Scientific classification
- Kingdom: Plantae
- Clade: Tracheophytes
- Clade: Angiosperms
- Clade: Eudicots
- Clade: Asterids
- Order: Asterales
- Family: Asteraceae
- Genus: Pentacalia
- Species: P. hurtadoi

Binomial name
- Pentacalia hurtadoi H.Rob. & Cuatrec.

Species of flowering plant

Pentacalia hurtadoi is a species of flowering plant in the family Asteraceae. It is a climber found only in Ecuador. Its natural habitat is subtropical or tropical moist montane forests. It is threatened by habitat loss.
