= Flosmutisia =

Scientific classification
- Kingdom: Plantae
- Clade: Embryophytes
- Clade: Tracheophytes
- Clade: Angiosperms
- Clade: Eudicots
- Clade: Asterids
- Order: Asterales
- Family: Asteraceae
- Subfamily: Asteroideae
- Tribe: Astereae
- Subtribe: Baccharidinae
- Genus: Flosmutisia; Cuatrec.
- Species: F. paramicola

Binomial name
- Flosmutisia paramicola Cuatrec.

Genus of flowering plants

Flosmutisia is a genus of flowering plants in the family Asteraceae.

There is only one known species, Flosmutisia paramicola, endemic to the Magdalena region of northern Colombia.
