= Gynoxys rimachiana =

Conservation status
- Vulnerable (IUCN 2.3)

Scientific classification
- Kingdom: Plantae
- Clade: Tracheophytes
- Clade: Angiosperms
- Clade: Eudicots
- Clade: Asterids
- Order: Asterales
- Family: Asteraceae
- Subfamily: Asteroideae
- Tribe: Senecioneae
- Genus: Gynoxys
- Species: G. rimachiana

Binomial name
- Gynoxys rimachiana Cuatrec.

Synonyms
- Aequatorium rimachianum (Cuatrec.) H.Rob. & Cuatrec.; Nordenstamia rimachiana (Cuatrec.) B.Nord.

Species of plant

Gynoxys rimachiana is a species of flowering plant in the family Asteraceae. It is found only in Peru. It is known from Huánuco Department, where it grows on rocky slopes between 2,500 and 3,000 meters elevation.
