= Pentacalia oronocensis =

Conservation status
- Endangered (IUCN 3.1)

Scientific classification
- Kingdom: Plantae
- Clade: Tracheophytes
- Clade: Angiosperms
- Clade: Eudicots
- Clade: Asterids
- Order: Asterales
- Family: Asteraceae
- Genus: Pentacalia
- Species: P. oronocensis

Binomial name
- Pentacalia oronocensis (DC.) Cuatrec.

Synonyms
- Pentacalia gibbiflora (Cuatrec.) Cuatrec.; Pentacalia megaphlebia (Greenm. & Cuatrec.) Cuatrec.; Senecio baccharidiflorus Rusby; Senecio cuzcoensis Cabrera; Senecio gibbiflorus Cuatrec.; Senecio megaphlebius Greenm. & Cuatrec.; Senecio oronocensis DC. (1838) (basionym); Senecio ramonii Cuatrec.

Species of flowering plant

Pentacalia oronocensis is a species of flowering plant in the family Asteraceae. It is native to Ecuador, Peru, and northern and central Bolivia. Its natural habitat is subtropical or tropical moist montane forests. It is threatened by habitat loss.
