= Brunellia darienensis =

Conservation status
- Endangered (IUCN 2.3)

Scientific classification
- Kingdom: Plantae
- Clade: Tracheophytes
- Clade: Angiosperms
- Clade: Eudicots
- Clade: Rosids
- Order: Oxalidales
- Family: Brunelliaceae
- Genus: Brunellia
- Species: B. darienensis

Binomial name
- Brunellia darienensis Cuatrec. & D.M.Porter

Species of plant

Brunellia darienensis is a species of flowering plant in the Brunelliaceae family. It is a shrub or tree native to Costa Rica and Panama. It is threatened by habitat loss.
