= Brunellia acostae =

Conservation status
- Least Concern (IUCN 3.1)

Scientific classification
- Kingdom: Plantae
- Clade: Tracheophytes
- Clade: Angiosperms
- Clade: Eudicots
- Clade: Rosids
- Order: Oxalidales
- Family: Brunelliaceae
- Genus: Brunellia
- Species: B. acostae

Binomial name
- Brunellia acostae Cuatrec.

Synonyms
- Brunellia diversifolia C.I.Orozco

Species of flowering plant

Brunellia acostae is a species of flowering plant in the Brunelliaceae family. It is a tree native to Ecuador, Panama, and Colombia.
