= Neocuatrecasia =

Scientific classification
- Kingdom: Plantae
- Clade: Tracheophytes
- Clade: Angiosperms
- Clade: Eudicots
- Clade: Asterids
- Order: Asterales
- Family: Asteraceae
- Subfamily: Asteroideae
- Tribe: Eupatorieae
- Genus: Neocuatrecasia; R.M.King & H.Rob.

Type species
- Eupatorium lobatum B.L.Rob.

Genus of flowering plants

Neocuatrecasia is a genus of South American flowering plants in the tribe Eupatorieae within the family Asteraceae.

The genus is named in honor of Spanish botanist José Cuatrecasas (1903–1996).

Species

- Neocuatrecasia cuzcoensis R.M.King & H.Rob.
- Neocuatrecasia dispar (B.L.Rob.) R.M.King & H.Rob.
- Neocuatrecasia feuereri R.M.King & H.Rob.
- Neocuatrecasia hirtella R.M.King & H.Rob.
- Neocuatrecasia lobata (B.L.Rob.) R.M.King & H.Rob.
- Neocuatrecasia mancoana (B.L.Rob.) R.M.King & H.Rob.
- Neocuatrecasia sandiensis H.Rob.
- Neocuatrecasia sessilifolia R.M.King & H.Rob.
- Neocuatrecasia thymifolia (Britton) R.M.King & H.Rob.
- Neocuatrecasia tysonii H.Rob.
- Neocuatrecasia weddellii (B.L.Rob.) R.M.King & H.Rob.
- Neocuatrecasia yungasensis H.Rob.
