= Gynoxys reinaldi =

Conservation status
- Vulnerable (IUCN 3.1)

Scientific classification
- Kingdom: Plantae
- Clade: Tracheophytes
- Clade: Angiosperms
- Clade: Eudicots
- Clade: Asterids
- Order: Asterales
- Family: Asteraceae
- Genus: Gynoxys
- Species: G. reinaldi

Binomial name
- Gynoxys reinaldi Cuatrec.

Species of flowering plant

Gynoxys reinaldi is a species of flowering plant in the family Asteraceae. It is found only in Ecuador. Its natural habitat is subtropical or tropical moist montane forests. It is threatened by habitat loss due to deforestation.
