= Pentasalia =

Pentasalia may be

- misspelling of Pentacalia, genus of Asteraceae plants in the Americas
- misspelling of Pentasilia, Amazon queen in Greek myth
