= Pentacalia huilensis =

Conservation status
- Vulnerable (IUCN 3.1)

Scientific classification
- Kingdom: Plantae
- Clade: Tracheophytes
- Clade: Angiosperms
- Clade: Eudicots
- Clade: Asterids
- Order: Asterales
- Family: Asteraceae
- Subfamily: Asteroideae
- Tribe: Senecioneae
- Genus: Pentacalia
- Species: P. huilensis

Binomial name
- Pentacalia huilensis (Cuatrec.) Cuatrec.

Synonyms
- Pentacalia carmelana H.Rob. & Cuatrec.; Senecio huilensis Cuatrec. (1944) (basionym)

Species of flowering plant

Pentacalia huilensis is a species of flowering plant in the family Asteraceae. It a climber native to Colombia and northern Ecuador. Its natural habitat is subtropical or tropical moist montane forests. It is threatened by habitat loss.
