= Brunellia penderiscana =

Conservation status
- Least Concern (IUCN 3.1)

Scientific classification
- Kingdom: Plantae
- Clade: Tracheophytes
- Clade: Angiosperms
- Clade: Eudicots
- Clade: Rosids
- Order: Oxalidales
- Family: Brunelliaceae
- Genus: Brunellia
- Species: B. penderiscana

Binomial name
- Brunellia penderiscana Cuatrec.

Species of flowering plant

Brunellia penderiscana is a species of flowering plant in the Brunelliaceae family. It is endemic to Colombia.
