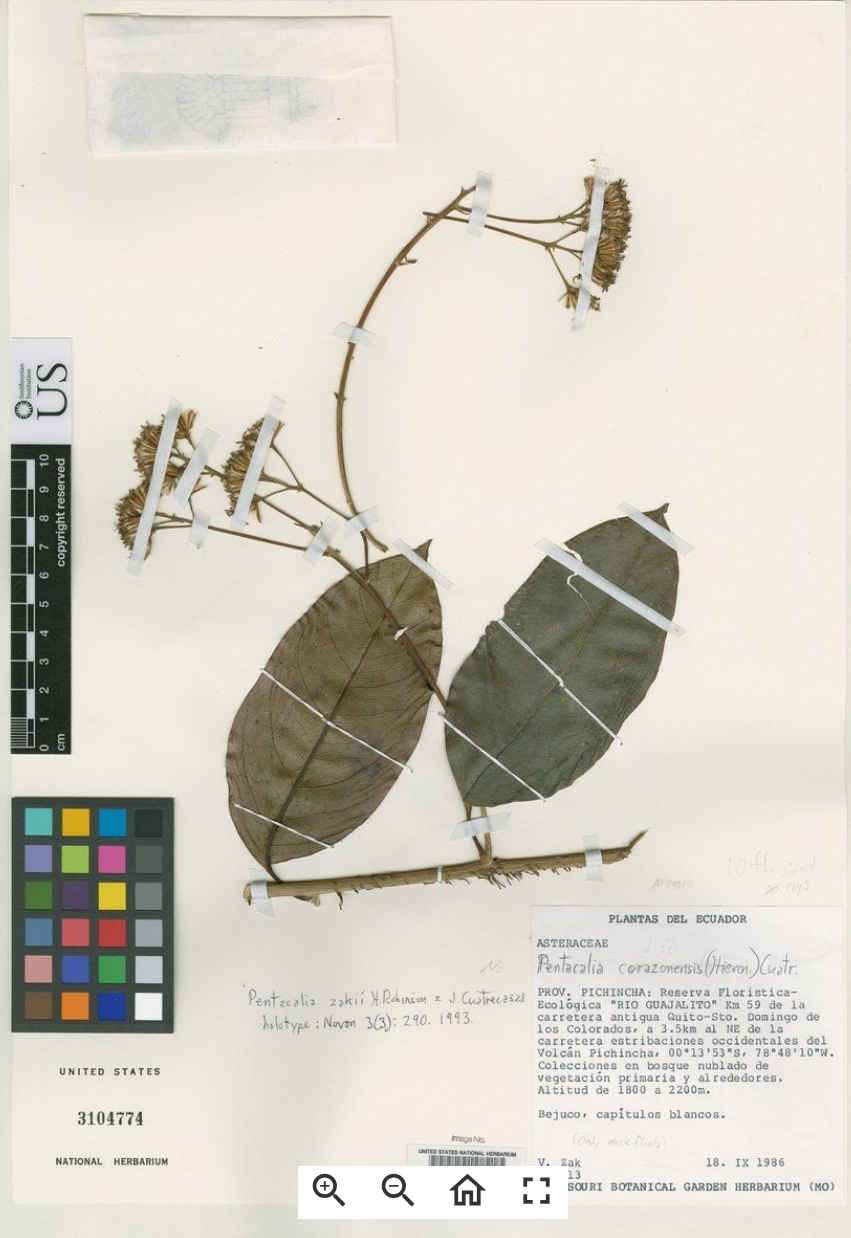

Conservation status
- Vulnerable (IUCN 3.1)

Scientific classification
- Kingdom: Plantae
- Clade: Tracheophytes
- Clade: Angiosperms
- Clade: Eudicots
- Clade: Asterids
- Order: Asterales
- Family: Asteraceae
- Subfamily: Asteroideae
- Tribe: Senecioneae
- Genus: Pentacalia
- Species: P. zakii

Binomial name
- Pentacalia zakii H.Rob. & Cuatrec.

Synonyms
- Pentacalia cazaletii H.Rob. & Cuatrec.

= Pentacalia zakii =

Species of flowering plant

Pentacalia zakii is a species of flowering plant in the family Asteraceae. It is a climber endemic to northwestern Ecuador.
