= Pentacalia todziae =

Scientific classification
- Kingdom: Plantae
- Clade: Tracheophytes
- Clade: Angiosperms
- Clade: Eudicots
- Clade: Asterids
- Order: Asterales
- Family: Asteraceae
- Subfamily: Asteroideae
- Tribe: Senecioneae
- Genus: Pentacalia
- Species: P. todziae

Binomial name
- Pentacalia todziae H.Rob. & Cuatrec.

Species of plant

Pentacalia todziae is a plant species of flowering plant in the family Asteraceae. It is native to southeastern Ecuador and northern Peru, including San Martín Province.

Pentacalia todziae is a large vine climbing over other vegetation. Stems are round in cross-section, hollow. Leaves are fleshy, thick and sturdy, broadly ovate, up to 17 cm long. Flower heads are borne in panicles up to 50 cm long, in the axils of the leaves. Heads each have about 8 yellow ray flowers and 25-30 yellow-brown disc flowers.
