= Gynoxys jaramilloi =

Conservation status
- Vulnerable (IUCN 3.1)

Scientific classification
- Kingdom: Plantae
- Clade: Tracheophytes
- Clade: Angiosperms
- Clade: Eudicots
- Clade: Asterids
- Order: Asterales
- Family: Asteraceae
- Genus: Gynoxys
- Species: G. jaramilloi

Binomial name
- Gynoxys jaramilloi H.Rob. & Cuatrec.

Species of flowering plant

Gynoxys jaramilloi is a species of flowering plant in the family Asteraceae. It is found only in Ecuador. Its natural habitat is characteristically subtropical or tropical moist montane forests. It is threatened by habitat loss.
