= Brunellia pauciflora =

Conservation status
- Endangered (IUCN 3.1)

Scientific classification
- Kingdom: Plantae
- Clade: Tracheophytes
- Clade: Angiosperms
- Clade: Eudicots
- Clade: Rosids
- Order: Oxalidales
- Family: Brunelliaceae
- Genus: Brunellia
- Species: B. pauciflora

Binomial name
- Brunellia pauciflora Cuatrec. & C.I.Orozco

Species of flowering plant

Brunellia pauciflora is a species of plant in the Brunelliaceae family. It is endemic to Ecuador. Its natural habitat is subtropical or tropical moist montane forests. It is threatened by habitat loss. The specific epithet pauciflora is Latin for 'few-flowered'.
