= Brunellia cayambensis =

Conservation status
- Vulnerable (IUCN 2.3)

Scientific classification
- Kingdom: Plantae
- Clade: Tracheophytes
- Clade: Angiosperms
- Clade: Eudicots
- Clade: Rosids
- Order: Oxalidales
- Family: Brunelliaceae
- Genus: Brunellia
- Species: B. cayambensis

Binomial name
- Brunellia cayambensis Cuatrec.

Synonyms
- Brunellia bullata Cuatrec.

Species of flowering plant

Brunellia cayambensis is a species of plant in the Brunelliaceae family. It is native to Ecuador and Colombia.
