= Gynoxys leiotheca =

Conservation status
- Data Deficient (IUCN 3.1)

Scientific classification
- Kingdom: Plantae
- Clade: Tracheophytes
- Clade: Angiosperms
- Clade: Eudicots
- Clade: Asterids
- Order: Asterales
- Family: Asteraceae
- Genus: Gynoxys
- Species: G. leiotheca

Binomial name
- Gynoxys leiotheca S.F.Blake

Species of flowering plant

Gynoxys leiotheca is a species of flowering plant in the family Asteraceae. It is found only in Ecuador. It is threatened by habitat loss.
