= Tessmannianthus =

Scientific classification
- Kingdom: Plantae
- Clade: Tracheophytes
- Clade: Angiosperms
- Clade: Eudicots
- Clade: Rosids
- Order: Myrtales
- Family: Melastomataceae
- Genus: Tessmannianthus; Markgr.

Genus of flowering plants

Tessmannianthus is a genus of flowering plants in the family Melastomataceae. There are seven species distributed in Central and South America. They are medium to large trees up to 40 meters (130 ft) tall. The flowers are heterantherous, bearing two types of stamens. These plants are rare, and some are narrow endemics known from only one location.

The genus name of Tessmannianthus is partly in honour of Günther Tessmann (1884–1969), a German-Brazilian ethnologist and botanist. He was also an African explorer and plant collector, who later settled in Brazil. The second part of the name, anthos refers to flower.

== Known species ==
- Tessmannianthus calcaratus (Gleason) Wurdack
- Tessmannianthus carinatus Almeda
- Tessmannianthus cenepensis Wurdack
- Tessmannianthus cereifolius Almeda
- Tessmannianthus gordonii Almeda
- Tessmannianthus heterostemon Markgraf
- Tessmannianthus quadridomius Wurdack
