= Gynoxys chagalensis =

Conservation status
- Endangered (IUCN 3.1)

Scientific classification
- Kingdom: Plantae
- Clade: Tracheophytes
- Clade: Angiosperms
- Clade: Eudicots
- Clade: Asterids
- Order: Asterales
- Family: Asteraceae
- Genus: Gynoxys
- Species: G. chagalensis

Binomial name
- Gynoxys chagalensis Hieron.

Species of flowering plant

Gynoxys chagalensis is a species of flowering plant in the family Asteraceae. It is a shrub or small tree found only in Ecuador. Its natural habitat is tropical moist montane forest from 2,300 3,200 metres elevation. It is threatened by habitat loss.
