= Tessmannianthus cereifolius =

Conservation status
- Data Deficient (IUCN 2.3)

Scientific classification
- Kingdom: Plantae
- Clade: Tracheophytes
- Clade: Angiosperms
- Clade: Eudicots
- Clade: Rosids
- Order: Myrtales
- Family: Melastomataceae
- Genus: Tessmannianthus
- Species: T. cereifolius

Binomial name
- Tessmannianthus cereifolius Almeda

Species of flowering plant

Tessmannianthus cereifolius is a species of plant in the family Melastomataceae. It is endemic to Panama.
