= Dendrophorbium pericaule =

Conservation status
- Vulnerable (IUCN 3.1)

Scientific classification
- Kingdom: Plantae
- Clade: Tracheophytes
- Clade: Angiosperms
- Clade: Eudicots
- Clade: Asterids
- Order: Asterales
- Family: Asteraceae
- Genus: Dendrophorbium
- Species: D. pericaule

Binomial name
- Dendrophorbium pericaule (Greenm.) B.Nord.

Species of flowering plant

Dendrophorbium pericaule is a species of flowering plant in the family Asteraceae. It can only be found in Ecuador. Its natural habitat is subtropical or tropical moist montane forests. It is threatened by habitat loss.
