= Dendrophorbium scytophyllum =

Conservation status
- Vulnerable (IUCN 3.1)

Scientific classification
- Kingdom: Plantae
- Clade: Tracheophytes
- Clade: Angiosperms
- Clade: Eudicots
- Clade: Asterids
- Order: Asterales
- Family: Asteraceae
- Genus: Dendrophorbium
- Species: D. scytophyllum

Binomial name
- Dendrophorbium scytophyllum (Kunth) C.Jeffrey

Synonyms
- Pentacalia scytophylla (Kunth) Cuatrec.; Senecio scytophyllus Kunth; Dendrophorbium onae (Cuatrec.) C.Jeffrey; Dendrophorbium onae var. leonis (Cuatrec.) B.Nord.; Pentacalia onae (Cuatrec.) Cuatrec.; Senecio onae Cuatrec.; Senecio onae var. leonis Cuatrec.

Species of flowering plant

Dendrophorbium scytophyllum is a species of flowering plant in the family Asteraceae. It is found only in Ecuador. Its natural habitat is subtropical or tropical moist montane forests. It is threatened by habitat loss.
