= Tessmannianthus gordonii =

Conservation status
- Endangered (IUCN 2.3)

Scientific classification
- Kingdom: Plantae
- Clade: Tracheophytes
- Clade: Angiosperms
- Clade: Eudicots
- Clade: Rosids
- Order: Myrtales
- Family: Melastomataceae
- Genus: Tessmannianthus
- Species: T. gordonii

Binomial name
- Tessmannianthus gordonii Almeda

Species of flowering plant

Tessmannianthus gordonii is a species of plant in the family Melastomataceae. It is endemic to Panama. It is threatened by habitat loss.
