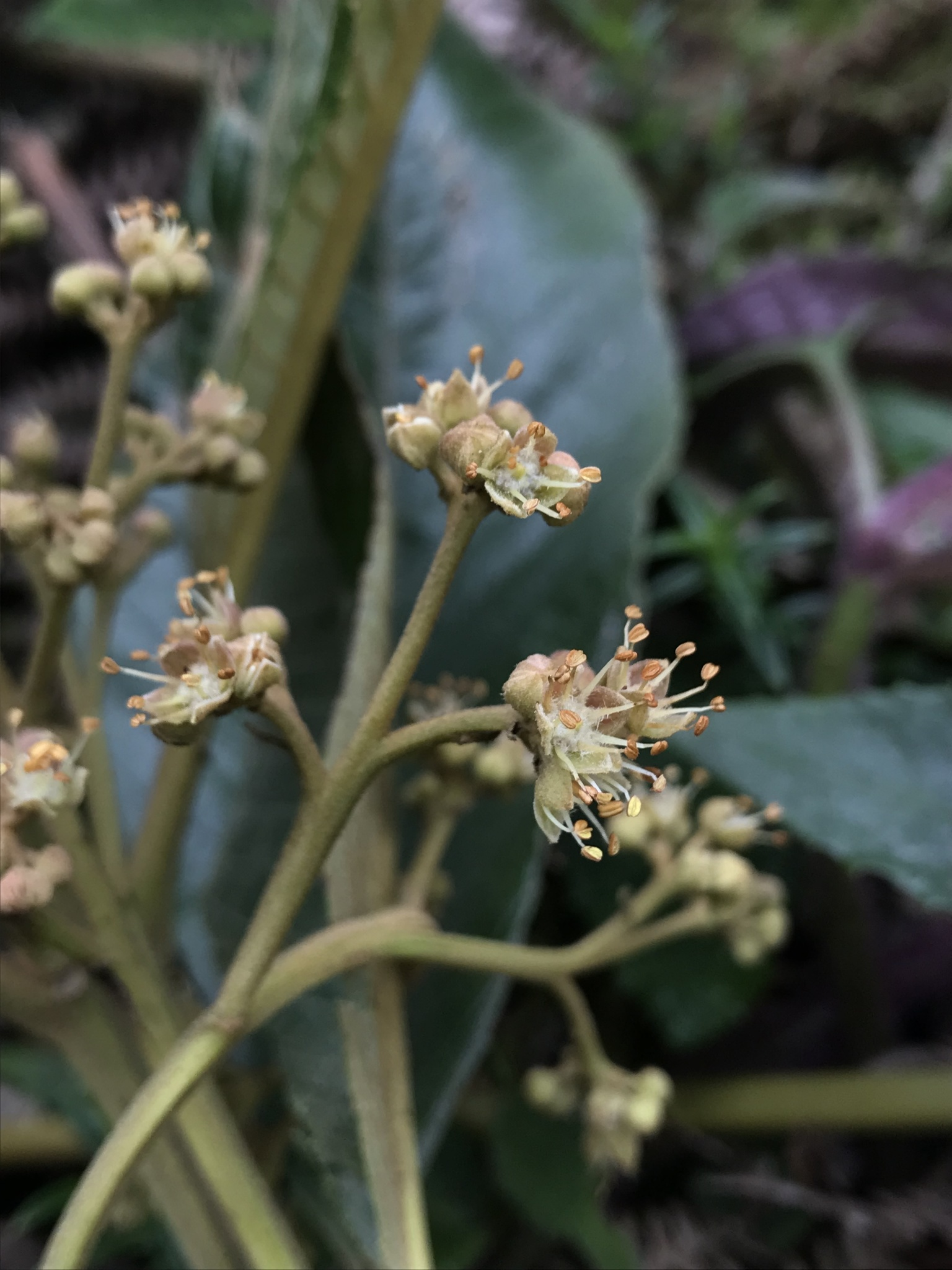

Scientific classification
- Kingdom: Plantae
- Clade: Tracheophytes
- Clade: Angiosperms
- Clade: Eudicots
- Clade: Rosids
- Order: Oxalidales
- Family: Brunelliaceae
- Genus: Brunellia
- Species: B. acutangula

Binomial name
- Brunellia acutangula Bonpl.

= Brunellia acutangula =

Species of tree

Brunellia acutangula is a species of tree in the genus Brunellia that is endemic in Colombia & Venezuela. It grows on wet tropical biomes. Its conservation status is Not Threatened.

== Description ==
The type specimen were collected near Nova Granata, Colombia.

Brunellia acutangula is a tall tree. The branches are distinctly three-angled and covered with a peculiar reddish-brown, tomentose-powdery pubescence.

The leaves are arranged in whorls of three, with short petioles. They are oblong in shape, slightly serrate along the margins, and acute at both the base and the tip. The upper surface is glabrous and shiny, while the lower surface is veined with a fine net-like venation and covered with a powdery pubescence. The inflorescence consists of racemes that are either terminal or axillary, solitary, and as long as the leaves. They bear many flowers. The sepal is positioned below the ovary and is deeply divided into four or five lobes. The lobes are oval, acute, erect, and persistent after flowering, with a powdery texture on the outer surface. A thick, green, depressed disc surrounds the ovaries. The stamens, usually eight in number, are inserted at the margin of the disc. The filaments are erect and hairy at the base, with erect, bilocular anthers. There are four or five ovaries, which are ovate and very hairy. Each has a filiform style and a subulate stigma. The fruit consists of four or five capsules arranged in a star-like pattern. They dehisce from the base to the apex along the inner side. The seeds are similar to those of other species in the genus.

== Taxonomy and naming ==
It was described in 1808 by Aimé Bonpland in Plantae Aequinoctiales 1, from specimens collected by Humboldt & Bonpland. It got its epithet from the type specimen, meaning sharp-angled, referring to the angled branches and leaf midrib.

== Distribution and habitat ==
It is endemic in Colombia & Venezuela. It grows on wet tropical biomes. it grows at an altitude of nearly 3000 meters above sea level.

== Conservation ==
This species is assessed as Not Threatened, in a preliminary report.

== Gallery ==
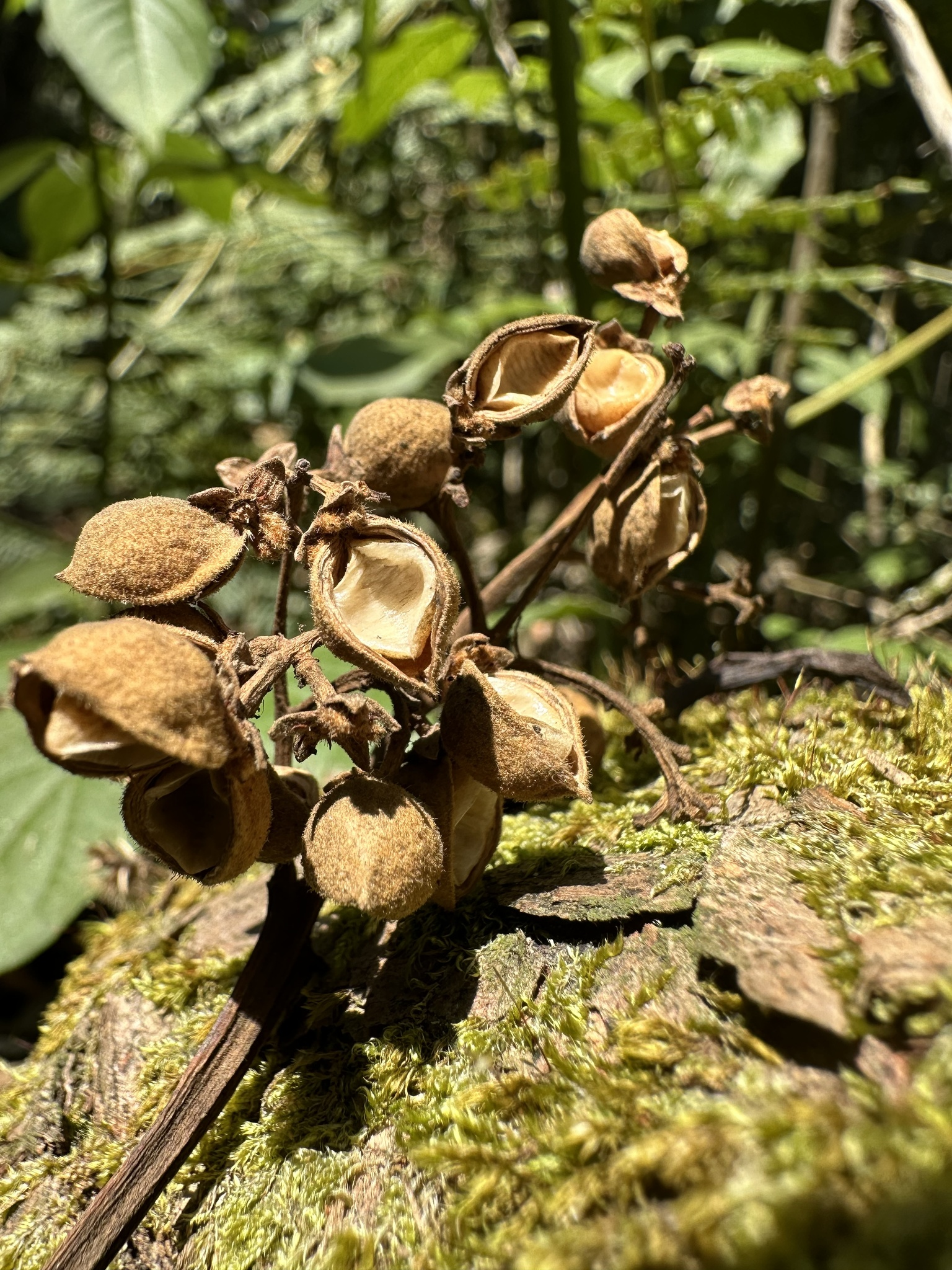
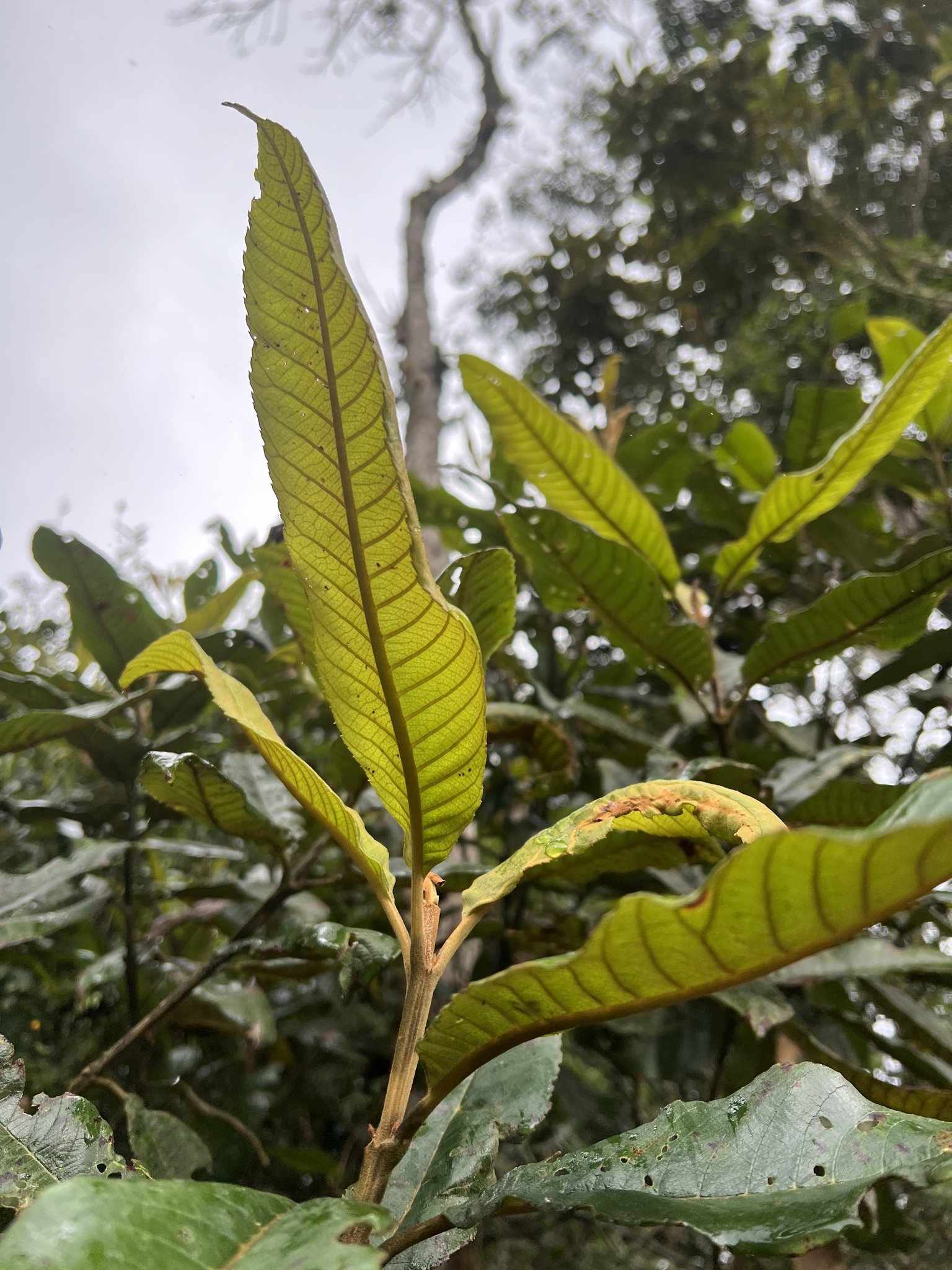
