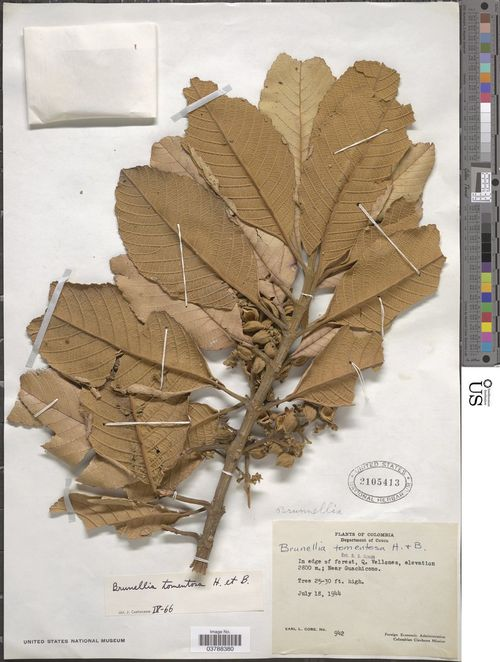

Scientific classification
- Kingdom: Plantae
- Clade: Tracheophytes
- Clade: Angiosperms
- Clade: Eudicots
- Clade: Rosids
- Order: Oxalidales
- Family: Brunelliaceae
- Genus: Brunellia
- Species: B. tomentosa

Binomial name
- Brunellia tomentosa Bonpl.

= Brunellia tomentosa =

Species of tree

Brunellia tomentosa is a species of tree in the genus Brunellia that is endemic in Colombia & Ecuador. It grows on wet tropical biomes. Its conservation status is Not Threatened.

== Description ==
The type specimen were collected near Páramo de Achupayas, Colombia.

Brunellia tomentosa is a tall, trembling tree, noted for its distinctive foliage.

The branches are rounded and smooth toward the base, becoming obtusely angled toward the tips and covered in a dense, woolly pubescence, with the whole surface scattered in globular warts. The leaves stand opposite one another on short stalks and are leathery in texture, their blades serrated along the edges and tapering to a sharp point at the apex. Beneath, the leaves show a network of fine, raised veins, while above they are marked by prominent, graceful nerves. The flower clusters appear at the ends of branches or in the leaf axils, solitary and shorter than the leaves, with flowers gathered loosely together. The sepal is divided into four to seven segments, woolly like the branches, and remains attached after flowering, though there is no corolla. A thick, hairy disc encircles the pistils, and upon this disc are set twelve stamens with upright anthers divided into two chambers. The ovary consists of four to seven parts, though many of these fail to develop, and an equal number of slender styles rise from them. The fruit forms a dense head of hardened, obliquely ovoid achenes.

== Taxonomy and naming ==
It was described in 1808 by Aimé Bonpland in Plantae Aequinoctiales 1, from specimens collected by Humboldt & Bonpland. It got its epithet from the type specimen, meaning covered with matted woolly hairs, referring to the dense pubescence that characterizes the branches and sepals of the species.

== Distribution and habitat ==
It is endemic in Colombia & Ecuador. It grows on wet tropical biomes. In Colombia, it grows at an altitude of 1800 - 3100 meters above sea level.

== Conservation ==
This species is assessed as Not Threatened, in a preliminary report.
