= Gynoxys colanensis =

Conservation status
- Vulnerable (IUCN 2.3)

Scientific classification
- Kingdom: Plantae
- Clade: Tracheophytes
- Clade: Angiosperms
- Clade: Eudicots
- Clade: Asterids
- Order: Asterales
- Family: Asteraceae
- Genus: Gynoxys
- Species: G. colanensis

Binomial name
- Gynoxys colanensis Dillon & Sagást.

Species of flowering plant

Gynoxys colanensis is a species of flowering plant in the family Asteraceae. It is found only in Peru.
