= Brunellia occidentalis =

Conservation status
- Vulnerable (IUCN 3.1)

Scientific classification
- Kingdom: Plantae
- Clade: Tracheophytes
- Clade: Angiosperms
- Clade: Eudicots
- Clade: Rosids
- Order: Oxalidales
- Family: Brunelliaceae
- Genus: Brunellia
- Species: B. occidentalis

Binomial name
- Brunellia occidentalis Cuatrec.

Species of flowering plant

Brunellia occidentalis is a species of plant in the Brunelliaceae family. It is endemic to Colombia.
