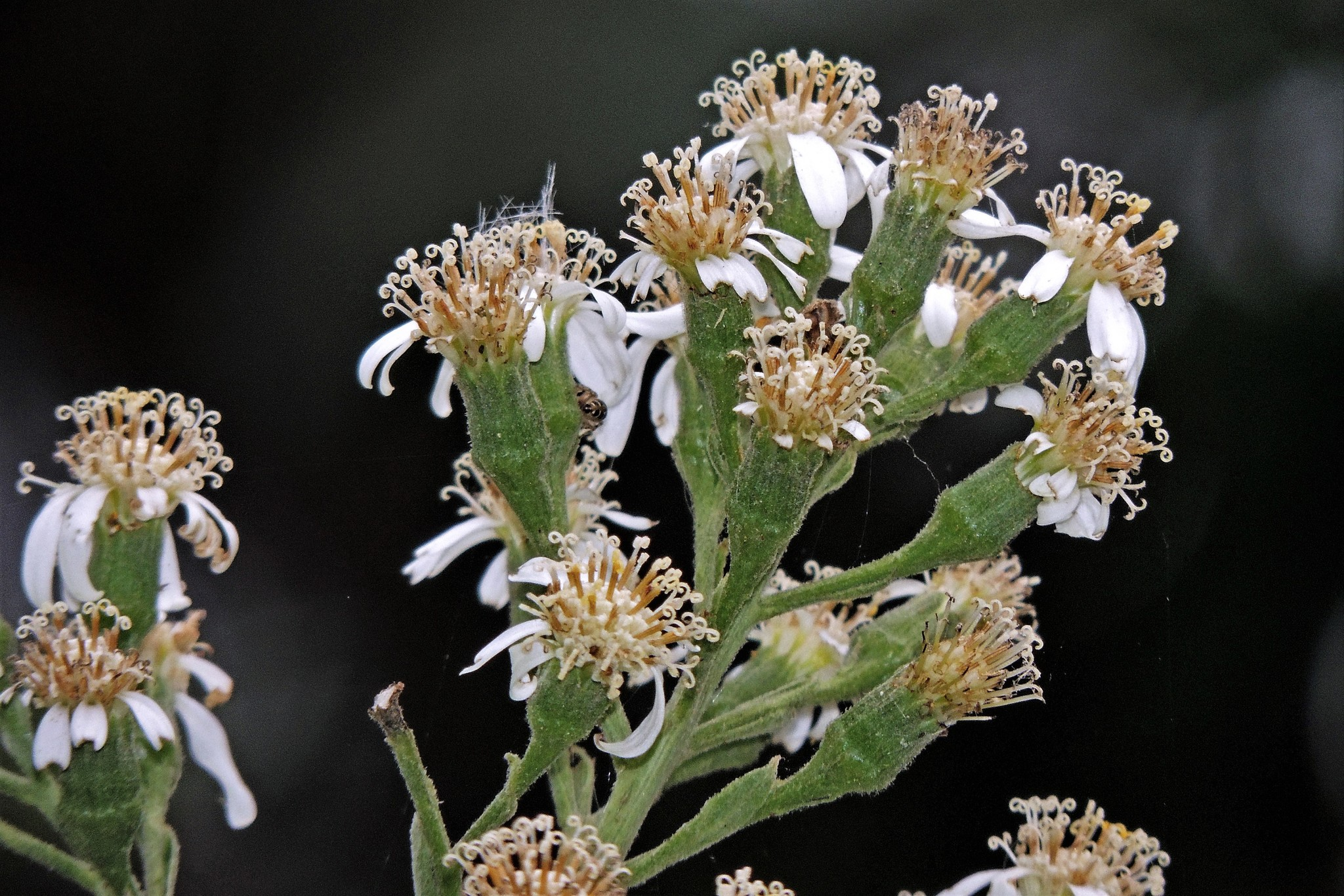

Scientific classification
- Kingdom: Plantae
- Clade: Tracheophytes
- Clade: Angiosperms
- Clade: Eudicots
- Clade: Asterids
- Order: Asterales
- Family: Asteraceae
- Genus: Dendrophorbium
- Species: D. peregrinum

Binomial name
- Dendrophorbium peregrinum (Griseb.) C.Jeffrey

Synonyms
- Senecio peregrinus Griseb.

= Dendrophorbium peregrinum =

Species of plant

Dendrophorbium peregrinum is a species of flowering plant in the family Asteraceae, native to northwestern Argentina and Bolivia. It was first described by August Grisebach in 1879 as Senecio peregrinus.

== Description ==
Dendrophorbium peregrinum, commonly known as string of dolphins, is a distinctive succulent with leaves that resemble leaping dolphins. Its fleshy, elongated leaves are bright green and feature unique white markings that resemble the playful dolphins' fins. Each leaf is adorned with a series of tiny, crescent-shaped "fins", giving the plant its distinctive appearance. It has a trailing growth habit, making it suitable for hanging baskets or as a trailing accent in garden arrangements. It can produce small, daisy-like flowers when mature.
