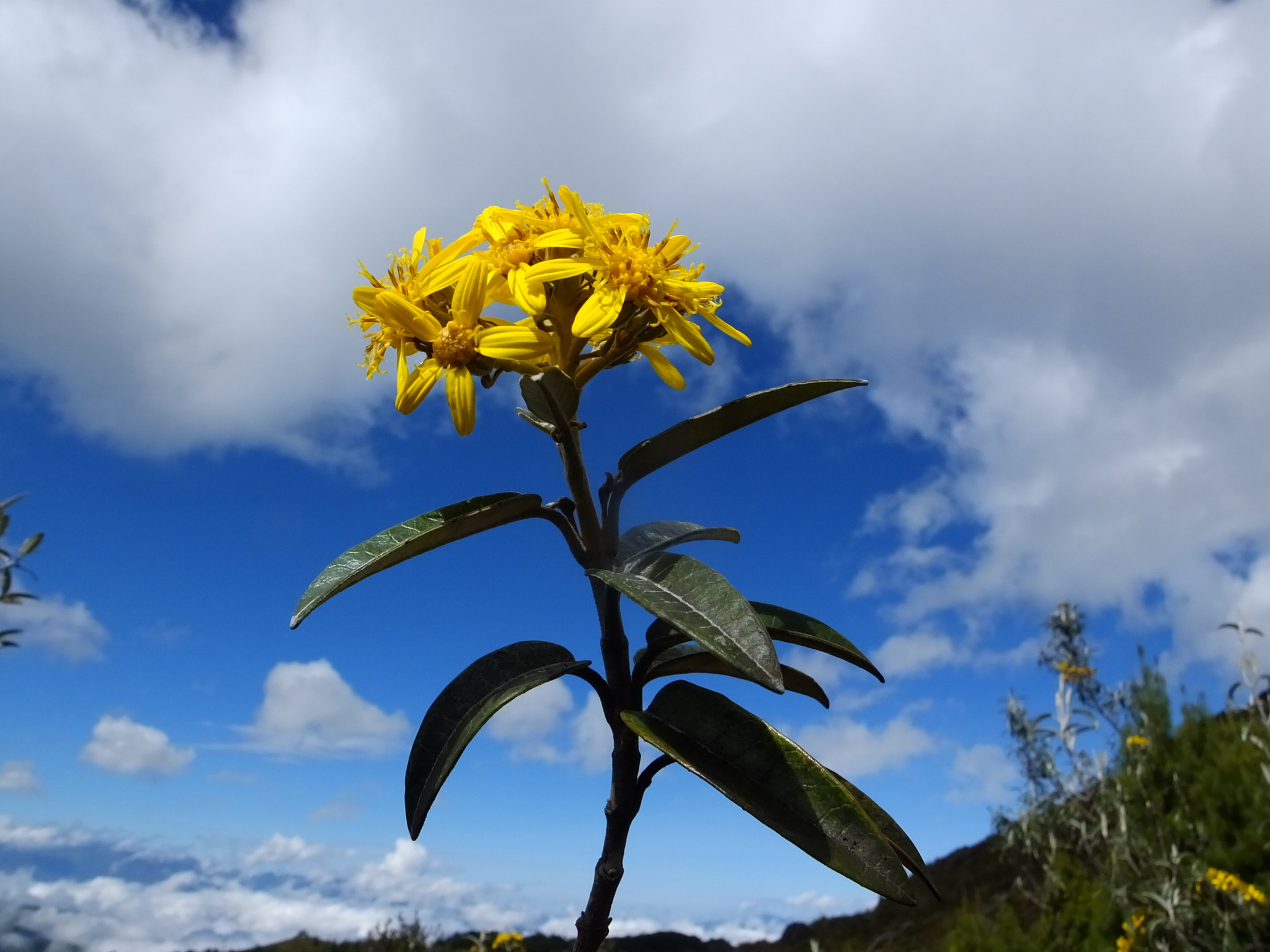
- Gynoxys ferreyrae in Peru

Scientific classification
- Kingdom: Plantae
- Clade: Embryophytes
- Clade: Tracheophytes
- Clade: Spermatophytes
- Clade: Angiosperms
- Clade: Eudicots
- Clade: Asterids
- Order: Asterales
- Family: Asteraceae
- Subfamily: Asteroideae
- Tribe: Senecioneae
- Genus: Gynoxys; Cass.

Synonyms
- Gynoxis Rchb., orth. var.; Nordenstamia Lundin

= Gynoxys =

Genus of flowering plants

Gynoxys is a genus of South American flowering plants in the family Asteraceae. It includes 117 species which range from Venezuela through Colombia, Ecuador, Peru, and Bolivia to northwestern Argentina.

Recent phylogenomic and morphological studies found the species of the former genus Nordenstamia were nested within Gynoxys, and Nordenstamia has now been subsumed into Gynoxys.

== Species ==
117 species are accepted.

- Gynoxys acostae Cuatrec.
- Gynoxys albifluminis Cuatrec.
- Gynoxys albivestita Cuatrec.
- Gynoxys apollinaris Cuatrec.
- Gynoxys arnicae Cuatrec.
- Gynoxys asterotricha Sch.Bip.
- Gynoxys azuayensis Cuatrec.
- Gynoxys baccharoides Cass.
- Gynoxys bracteolata Cuatrec.
- Gynoxys buxifolia Cass.
- Gynoxys callacallana Cuatrec.
- Gynoxys calyculisolvens Hieron.
- Gynoxys campii Cuatrec.
- Gynoxys capituliparva Cuatrec.
- Gynoxys caracensis Muschl.
- Gynoxys carpishensis Cuatrec.
- Gynoxys cerrateana B.Herrera
- Gynoxys chagalensis Hieron.
- Gynoxys chimborazensis Hieron.
- Gynoxys chingualensis H.Rob. & Cuatrec.
- Gynoxys colanensis M.O.Dillon & Sagást.
- Gynoxys columbiana (Klatt) Hieron.
- Gynoxys compressissima Cuatrec.
- Gynoxys congestiflora Sagást. & M.O.Dillon
- Gynoxys corazonensis Hieron.
- Gynoxys costihirsuta Cuatrec.
- Gynoxys cuatrecasasii B.Herrera
- Gynoxys cuicochensis Cuatrec.
- Gynoxys cusilluyocana Cuatrec.
- Gynoxys cutervensis Hieron.
- Gynoxys cuzcoensis Cuatrec.
- Gynoxys cygnata S.Díaz & A.Correa
- Gynoxys dielsiana Domke
- Gynoxys dilloniana Sagást. & C.Téllez
- Gynoxys fabrisii Cabrera
- Gynoxys fallax Mattf.
- Gynoxys ferreyrae B.Herrera
- Gynoxys flexopedes Cuatrec.
- Gynoxys florulenta Cuatrec.
- Gynoxys foliosa S.F.Blake
- Gynoxys frontinoensis S.Díaz & A.Correa
- Gynoxys fuliginosa Cass.
- Gynoxys hallii Hieron.
- Gynoxys henrici Mattf.
- Gynoxys hirsuta Wedd.
- Gynoxys hirsutissima Cuatrec.
- Gynoxys huanucona (Cuatrec.) Cuatrec.
- Gynoxys huasahuasis Cuatrec.
- Gynoxys hutchisonii H.Rob. & Cuatrec.
- Gynoxys hypoleucophylla Cuatrec.
- Gynoxys ignaciana Cuatrec.
- Gynoxys induta Cuatrec.
- Gynoxys infralanata Cuatrec.
- Gynoxys jaramilloi H.Rob. & Cuatrec.
- Gynoxys jelskii Hieron.
- Gynoxys laurata Cuatrec.
- Gynoxys laurifolia Cass.
- Gynoxys lehmannii Hieron.
- Gynoxys leiotheca S.F.Blake
- Gynoxys littlei Cuatrec.
- Gynoxys longifolia Wedd.
- Gynoxys longistyla (Greenm. & Cuatrec.) Cuatrec.
- Gynoxys macfrancisci Cuatrec.
- Gynoxys macrophylla Muschl.
- Gynoxys malcabalensis Cuatrec.
- Gynoxys mandonii Sch.Bip. ex Rusby
- Gynoxys marcapatana Cuatrec.
- Gynoxys megacephala Rusby
- Gynoxys meridana Cuatrec.
- Gynoxys metcalfii Cuatrec.
- Gynoxys miniphylla Cuatrec.
- Gynoxys monzonensis Mattf.
- Gynoxys moritziana Sch.Bip. ex Wedd.
- Gynoxys multibracteifera H.Rob. & Cuatrec.
- Gynoxys myrtoides Mattf.
- Gynoxys neovelutina Cuatrec.
- Gynoxys nitida Muschl.
- Gynoxys oleifolia Muschl.
- Gynoxys pachyphylla Mattf.
- Gynoxys paramuna Cuatrec.
- Gynoxys parvifolia Cuatrec.
- Gynoxys pendula Sch.Bip. ex Wedd.
- Gynoxys perbracteosa Cuatrec.
- Gynoxys pillahuatensis Cuatrec.
- Gynoxys poggeana Mattf.
- Gynoxys psilophylla Klatt
- Gynoxys pulchella Cass.
- Gynoxys reinaldi Cuatrec.
- Gynoxys repanda Wedd.
- Gynoxys rimachiana Cuatrec.
- Gynoxys rimbachii Cuatrec.
- Gynoxys rugulosa Muschl.
- Gynoxys rusbyi Cuatrec.
- Gynoxys sancti-antonii Cuatrec.
- Gynoxys seleriana Muschl.
- Gynoxys sodiroi Hieron.
- Gynoxys sorataensis Cuatrec.
- Gynoxys soukupii Cuatrec.
- Gynoxys stuebelii Hieron.
- Gynoxys subamplectens Cuatrec.
- Gynoxys subcinerea Cuatrec.
- Gynoxys subhirsuta Cuatrec.
- Gynoxys szyszylowiczii Hieron.
- Gynoxys tabaconasensis H.Beltrán & Baldeón
- Gynoxys tetroici V.A.Funk & H.Rob.
- Gynoxys tolimensis Cuatrec.
- Gynoxys tomentosissima Cuatrec.
- Gynoxys trianae Hieron.
- Gynoxys tuestae (Cuatrec.) Cuatrec.
- Gynoxys vacana Cuatrec.
- Gynoxys validifolia Cuatrec.
- Gynoxys venulosa Cuatrec.
- Gynoxys violacea Sch.Bip. ex Wedd.
- Gynoxys visoensis Cuatrec.
- Gynoxys weberbaueri Mattf.
- Gynoxys woytkowskii (Cuatrec.) Cuatrec.
- Gynoxys yananoensis Cuatrec.
