= Gynoxys baccharoides =

Conservation status
- Vulnerable (IUCN 3.1)

Scientific classification
- Kingdom: Plantae
- Clade: Tracheophytes
- Clade: Angiosperms
- Clade: Eudicots
- Clade: Asterids
- Order: Asterales
- Family: Asteraceae
- Genus: Gynoxys
- Species: G. baccharoides

Binomial name
- Gynoxys baccharoides Cass.

Synonyms
- Gynoxys lindenii Sch.Bip. ex Wedd.; Senecio baccharoides Kunth

Species of plant

Gynoxys baccharoides is a species of flowering plant in the family Asteraceae. It native to Colombia, Ecuador, and La Paz Department of Bolivia. Its natural habitats are subtropical or tropical moist montane forests and subtropical or tropical high-elevation shrubland. It is threatened by habitat loss.
