= Dendrophorbium amplexicaule =

Conservation status
- Endangered (IUCN 3.1)

Scientific classification
- Kingdom: Plantae
- Clade: Tracheophytes
- Clade: Angiosperms
- Clade: Eudicots
- Clade: Asterids
- Order: Asterales
- Family: Asteraceae
- Genus: Dendrophorbium
- Species: D. amplexicaule

Binomial name
- Dendrophorbium amplexicaule (Kunth) B.Nord.

Synonyms
- Pentacalia amplexicaulis (Kunth) Cuatrec.; Senecio amplexicaulis Kunth

Species of flowering plant

Dendrophorbium amplexicaule is a species of flowering plant in the family Asteraceae. It is endemic to Ecuador, where it inhabits subtropical or tropical moist montane forests and high-elevation shrubland. The species is currently threatened by habitat loss.
