= Pentacalia floribunda =

Conservation status
- Vulnerable (IUCN 3.1)

Scientific classification
- Kingdom: Plantae
- Clade: Tracheophytes
- Clade: Angiosperms
- Clade: Eudicots
- Clade: Asterids
- Order: Asterales
- Family: Asteraceae
- Subfamily: Asteroideae
- Tribe: Senecioneae
- Genus: Pentacalia
- Species: P. floribunda

Binomial name
- Pentacalia floribunda Cuatrec.

Synonyms
- Dendrophorbium floribundum (Cuatrec.) C.Jeffrey

Species of flowering plant

Pentacalia floribunda is a species of flowering plant in the family Asteraceae. It is found only in Ecuador. Its natural habitat is subtropical or tropical moist montane forests. It is threatened by habitat loss.
