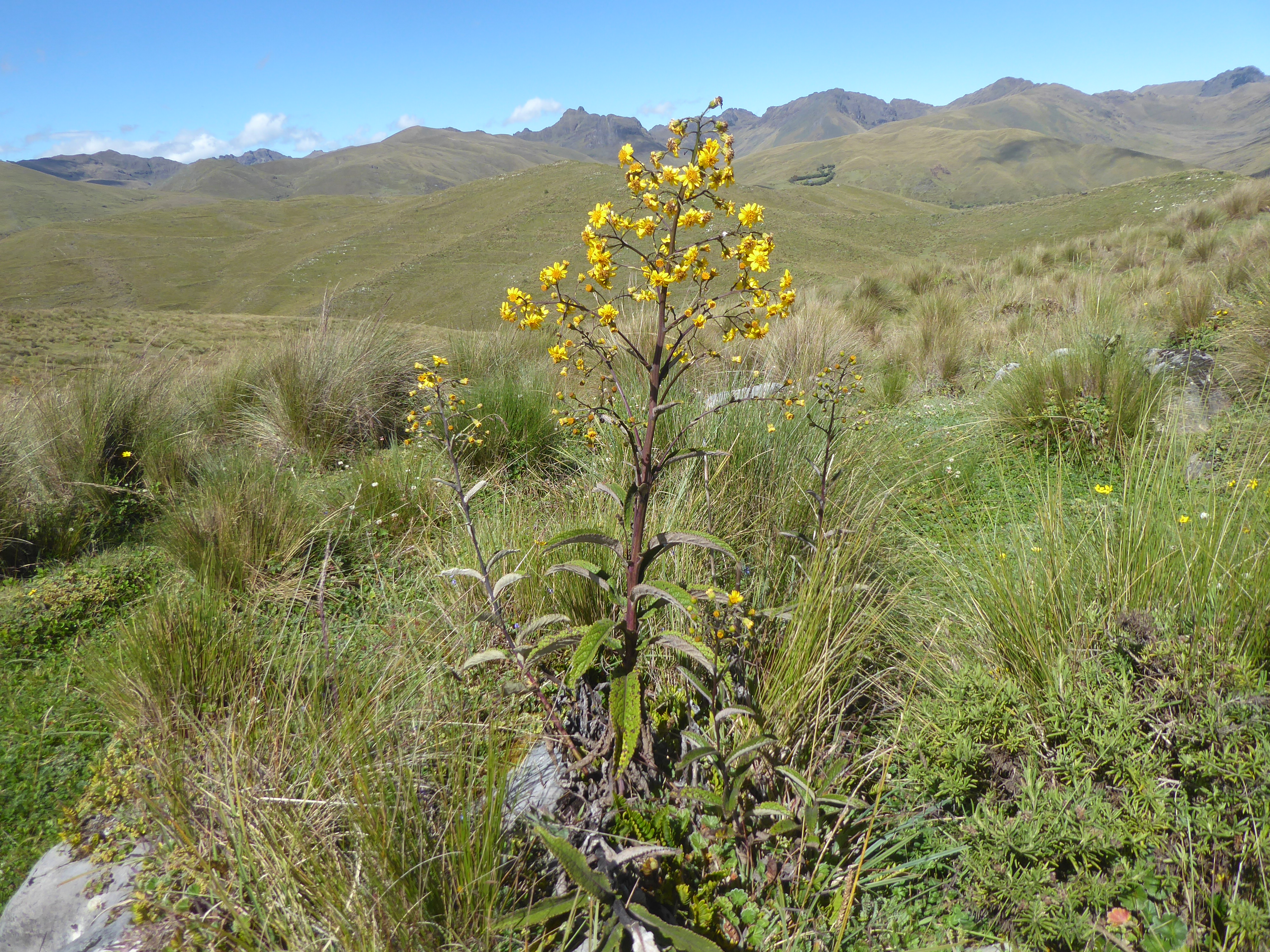
- Dendrophorbium chopinii

Scientific classification
- Kingdom: Plantae
- Clade: Embryophytes
- Clade: Tracheophytes
- Clade: Spermatophytes
- Clade: Angiosperms
- Clade: Eudicots
- Clade: Asterids
- Order: Asterales
- Family: Asteraceae
- Subfamily: Asteroideae
- Tribe: Senecioneae
- Genus: Dendrophorbium (Cuatrec.) C.Jeffrey

Synonyms
- Senecio sect. Dendrophorbium Cuatrec.; Senecio sect. Myriocephalus Cabrera; Senecio sect. Macbrideus Cuatrec.; Senecio sect. Pluricephali Cabrera

= Dendrophorbium =

Genus of flowering plants

Dendrophorbium is a genus of South American flowering plants in the family Asteraceae.

Species accepted by the Plants of the World Online as of December 2022:

- Dendrophorbium acuminatissimum (Cabrera) D.J.N.Hind
- Dendrophorbium americanum (L.f.) C.Jeffrey
- Dendrophorbium amplexicaule (Kunth) B.Nord.
- Dendrophorbium angelense (Domke) B.Nord.
- Dendrophorbium arboluco (Cuatrec.) C.Jeffrey
- Dendrophorbium archeri (Cuatrec.) C.Jeffrey
- Dendrophorbium argutidentatum (Cuatrec.) H.Beltrán
- Dendrophorbium ayopayense (Cuatrec.) D.J.N.Hind
- Dendrophorbium azoguesense J.Calvo & Minga
- Dendrophorbium balsapampae (Cuatrec.) B.Nord.
- Dendrophorbium barkleyanum (Cuatrec.) C.Jeffrey
- Dendrophorbium biacuminatum (Rusby) C.Jeffrey
- Dendrophorbium biserrifolium (Kuntze) D.J.N.Hind
- Dendrophorbium bomanii (R.E.Fr.) C.Jeffrey
- Dendrophorbium brachycodon (Baker) C.Jeffrey
- Dendrophorbium bradei (Cabrera) C.Jeffrey
- Dendrophorbium cabrerae (Cuatrec.) C.Jeffrey
- Dendrophorbium cabrerianum (Greenm. & Cuatrec.) C.Jeffrey
- Dendrophorbium capixabense J.Calvo & Roque
- Dendrophorbium castaneifolium (DC.) Pruski
- Dendrophorbium catharinense (Dusén ex Cabrera) C.Jeffrey
- Dendrophorbium chaenocephalum (Cabrera) C.Jeffrey
- Dendrophorbium chingualense (Cuatrec.) S.Díaz & Cuatrec.
- Dendrophorbium chopinii Montesinos
- Dendrophorbium chulumanicum (Cabrera) S.Beck & D.Ibáñez
- Dendrophorbium coroicense (Rusby) C.Jeffrey
- Dendrophorbium cosnipatense (Cabrera) H.Beltrán
- Dendrophorbium curvidens (Sch.Bip. ex Klatt) C.Jeffrey
- Dendrophorbium dielsii C.Jeffrey
- Dendrophorbium dodsonii (H.Rob. & Cuatrec.) B.Nord.
- Dendrophorbium dolichodoryium (Cuatrec.) C.Jeffrey
- Dendrophorbium elatum (Kunth) Pruski
- Dendrophorbium fastigiaticephalum (Cabrera) C.Jeffrey
- Dendrophorbium favillosum (Cuatrec.) C.Jeffrey
- Dendrophorbium floribundum (Cuatrec.) C.Jeffrey
- Dendrophorbium fortunatum (Cuatrec.) C.Jeffrey
- Dendrophorbium fruticosum (Vell.) C.Jeffrey
- Dendrophorbium gesnerifolium (Cuatrec.) B.Nord.
- Dendrophorbium glaziovii (Baker) C.Jeffrey
- Dendrophorbium goodspeedii (Cuatrec.) H.Beltrán
- Dendrophorbium gritense (Lapp, T.Ruíz & Torrec.) Pruski
- Dendrophorbium huasense (Cuatrec.) Pruski
- Dendrophorbium ingens (Benoist) B.Nord.
- Dendrophorbium kleinioides (Kunth) B.Nord.
- Dendrophorbium krukoffii (Cuatrec.) C.Jeffrey
- Dendrophorbium limosum C.Jeffrey
- Dendrophorbium llewelynii (Cuatrec.) H.Beltrán
- Dendrophorbium lloense (Hieron. ex Sodiro) C.Jeffrey
- Dendrophorbium longilinguae (Cuatrec.) C.Jeffrey
- Dendrophorbium lucidum (Sw.) C.Jeffrey
- Dendrophorbium medullosum (Sch.Bip. ex Greenm.) C.Jeffrey
- Dendrophorbium moscopanum (Cuatrec.) C.Jeffrey
- Dendrophorbium multinerve (Sch.Bip. ex Klatt) C.Jeffrey
- Dendrophorbium munchiquense (S.Díaz & Cuatrec.) Pruski
- Dendrophorbium ocanense (Greenm. & Cuatrec.) C.Jeffrey
- Dendrophorbium paranense (Malme) Matzenb. & L.R.M.Baptista
- Dendrophorbium pellucidinerve (Sch.Bip. ex Baker) C.Jeffrey
- Dendrophorbium peregrinum (Griseb.) C.Jeffrey
- Dendrophorbium pericaule (Greenm.) B.Nord.
- Dendrophorbium pluricephalum (Cabrera) C.Jeffrey
- Dendrophorbium pururu (Cuatrec.) C.Jeffrey
- Dendrophorbium reflexum (Kunth) C.Jeffrey
- Dendrophorbium restingae Teles, J.N.Nakaj. & Stehmann
- Dendrophorbium scaphiforme (Greenm.) C.Jeffrey
- Dendrophorbium scytophyllum (Kunth) C.Jeffrey
- Dendrophorbium sibundoyense (Cuatrec.) C.Jeffrey
- Dendrophorbium silvani (Cuatrec.) C.Jeffrey
- Dendrophorbium solisii (Cuatrec.) B.Nord.
- Dendrophorbium sotarense (Hieron.) C.Jeffrey
- Dendrophorbium storkii (Cuatrec.) C.Jeffrey
- Dendrophorbium subnemorale (Dusén) A.M.Teles
- Dendrophorbium tabacifolium (Rusby) C.Jeffrey
- Dendrophorbium tipocochense (Domke) B.Nord.
- Dendrophorbium toreadoris (Cuatrec.) B.Nord.
- Dendrophorbium trigynum (Cuatrec.) H.Beltrán
- Dendrophorbium vallecaucanum (Cuatrec.) Pruski
- Dendrophorbium vanillodorum (Cabrera) H.Beltrán
- Dendrophorbium vargasii (Cabrera) H.Beltrán
- Dendrophorbium varicosum J.Calvo
- Dendrophorbium yalusay (Cabrera) C.Jeffrey
- Dendrophorbium yungasense (Britton) C.Jeffrey
- Dendrophorbium zongoense (Cabrera) D.J.N.Hind
