= Dendrophorbium angelense =

Conservation status
- Endangered (IUCN 3.1)

Scientific classification
- Kingdom: Plantae
- Clade: Tracheophytes
- Clade: Angiosperms
- Clade: Eudicots
- Clade: Asterids
- Order: Asterales
- Family: Asteraceae
- Genus: Dendrophorbium
- Species: D. angelense

Binomial name
- Dendrophorbium angelense (Domke) B.Nord.

Synonyms
- Senecio angelensis Domke

Species of flowering plant

Dendrophorbium angelense is a species of flowering plant in the family Asteraceae. It is found only in Ecuador. Its natural habitats are tropical moist montane forests and tropical high-elevation shrubland. It is threatened by habitat loss.
