= Tessmannianthus quadridomius =

Conservation status
- Least Concern (IUCN 3.1)

Scientific classification
- Kingdom: Plantae
- Clade: Tracheophytes
- Clade: Angiosperms
- Clade: Eudicots
- Clade: Rosids
- Order: Myrtales
- Family: Melastomataceae
- Genus: Tessmannianthus
- Species: T. quadridomius

Binomial name
- Tessmannianthus quadridomius Wurdack

Species of flowering plant

Tessmannianthus quadridomius is a species of plant in the family Melastomataceae. It is endemic to Colombia.

Its name refers to botanist José Cuatrecasas: "quadridomius" is Latin for "cuatre casas".
