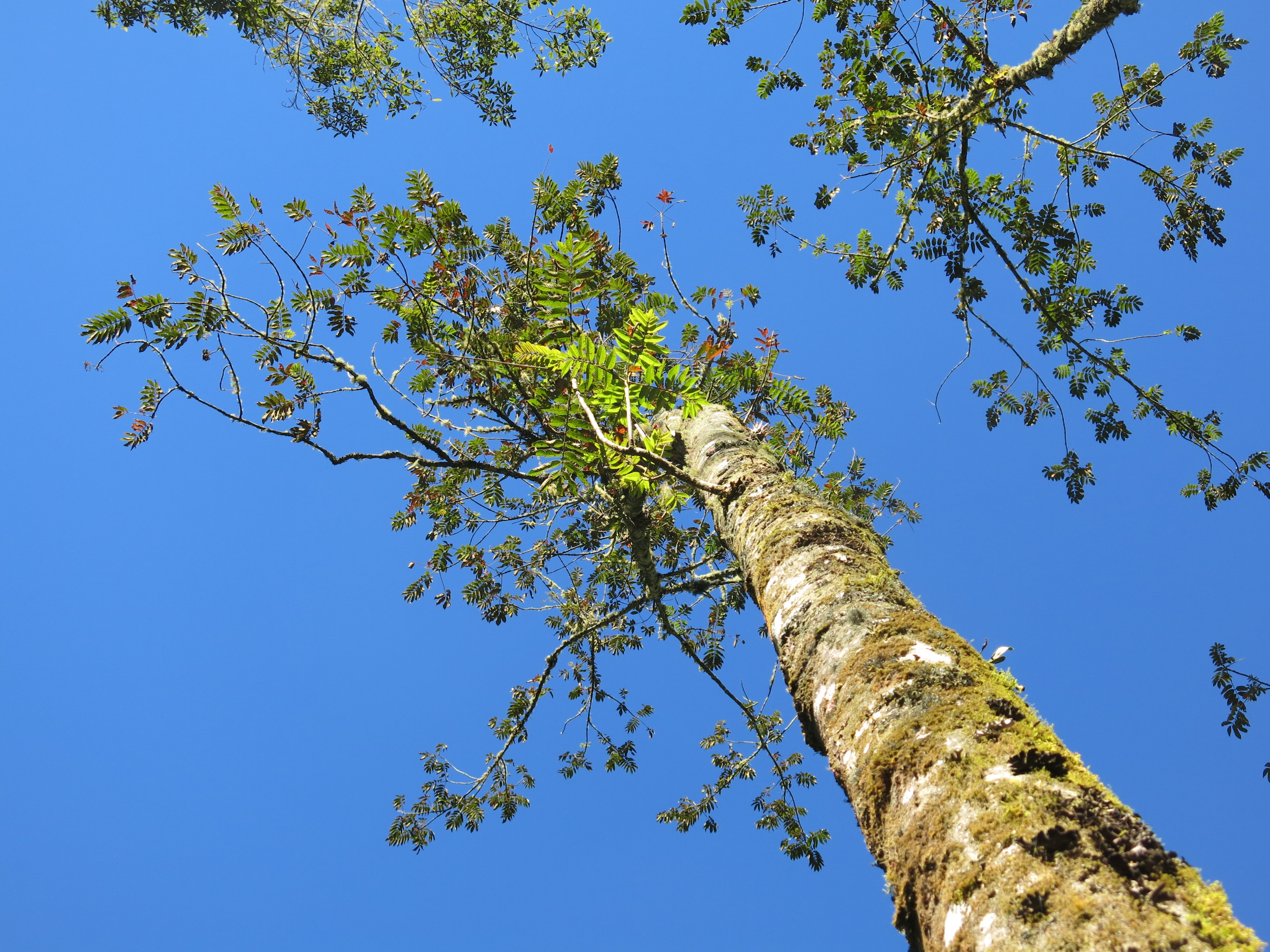
- Brunellia comocladifolia

Scientific classification
- Kingdom: Plantae
- Clade: Tracheophytes
- Clade: Angiosperms
- Clade: Eudicots
- Clade: Rosids
- Order: Oxalidales
- Family: Brunelliaceae; Engl.
- Genus: Brunellia; Ruiz & Pav.

Synonyms
- Apopetalum Pax

= Brunellia =

Genus of flowering plants

Brunellia is the sole genus in the flowering plant family Brunelliaceae, and contains 60 species as of December 2025. Plants in this genus grow as trees and are distributed in the mountainous regions of southern Mexico, Central America, West Indies, and South America.

== Species ==
As of December 2025, Plants of the World Online accepts the following 60 species:

- Brunellia acostae Cuatrec.
- Brunellia acutangula Bonpl.
- Brunellia alnifolia Bohórq.-Os. & C.I.Orozco
- Brunellia amayensis C.I.Orozco
- Brunellia boliviana Britton ex Rusby
- Brunellia boqueronensis Cuatrec.
- Brunellia briquetii Baehni
- Brunellia brunnea J.F.Macbr.
- Brunellia cayambensis Cuatrec.
- Brunellia comocladiifolia Bonpl.
- Brunellia costaricensis Standl.
- Brunellia cutervensis Cuatrec.
- Brunellia cuzcoensis Cuatrec.
- Brunellia darienensis Cuatrec. & D.M.Porter
- Brunellia dichapetaloides J.F.Macbr.
- Brunellia dulcis J.F.Macbr.
- Brunellia ecuadoriensis Cuatrec.
- Brunellia elliptica Cuatrec.
- Brunellia ephemeropetala C.I.Orozco & Á.J.Pérez
- Brunellia farallonensis Cuatrec.
- Brunellia foreroi C.I.Orozco
- Brunellia glabra Cuatrec.
- Brunellia goudotii Tul.
- Brunellia gracilis C.I.Orozco
- Brunellia hexasepala Loes.
- Brunellia hippocrepiformis C.I.Orozco & Á.J.Pérez
- Brunellia hygrothermica Cuatrec.
- Brunellia inermis Ruiz & Pav.
- Brunellia integrifolia Szyszyl.
- Brunellia latifolia Cuatrec.
- Brunellia littlei Cuatrec.
- Brunellia lobinii Böhnert & Weigend
- Brunellia macrophylla Killip & Cuatrec.
- Brunellia mexicana Standl.
- Brunellia morii Cuatrec.
- Brunellia neblinensis Steyerm. & Cuatrec.
- Brunellia occidentalis Cuatrec.
- Brunellia oliveri Britton
- Brunellia ovalifolia Bonpl.
- Brunellia pallida Cuatrec.
- Brunellia pauciflora Cuatrec. & C.I.Orozco
- Brunellia penderiscana Cuatrec.
- Brunellia pitayensis Cuatrec.
- Brunellia propinqua Kunth
- Brunellia putumayensis Cuatrec.
- Brunellia racemifera Tul.
- Brunellia rhoides Rusby
- Brunellia rufa Killip & Cuatrec.
- Brunellia sibundoya Cuatrec.
- Brunellia standleyana Cuatrec.
- Brunellia stenoptera Diels
- Brunellia stuebelii Hieron.
- Brunellia subsessilis Killip & Cuatrec.
- Brunellia susaconensis (Cuatrec.) C.I.Orozco
- Brunellia tomentosa Bonpl.
- Brunellia trianae Cuatrec.
- Brunellia trigyna Cuatrec.
- Brunellia velutina Cuatrec.
- Brunellia weberbaueri Loes.
- Brunellia zamorensis Steyerm.
