= Hoehnephytum =

Scientific classification
- Kingdom: Plantae
- Clade: Tracheophytes
- Clade: Angiosperms
- Clade: Eudicots
- Clade: Asterids
- Order: Asterales
- Family: Asteraceae
- Subfamily: Asteroideae
- Tribe: Senecioneae
- Genus: Hoehnephytum; Cabrera

Genus of flowering plants

Hoehnephytum is a genus of Brazilian flowering plants in the sunflower family.

Species

- Hoehnephytum almasense D.J.N.Hind - Bahia
- Hoehnephytum imbricatum (Gardner) Cabrera - Minas Gerais, Bahia
- Hoehnephytum trixoides (Gardner) Cabrera - Minas Gerais, São Paulo, Goiás, Distrito Federal
