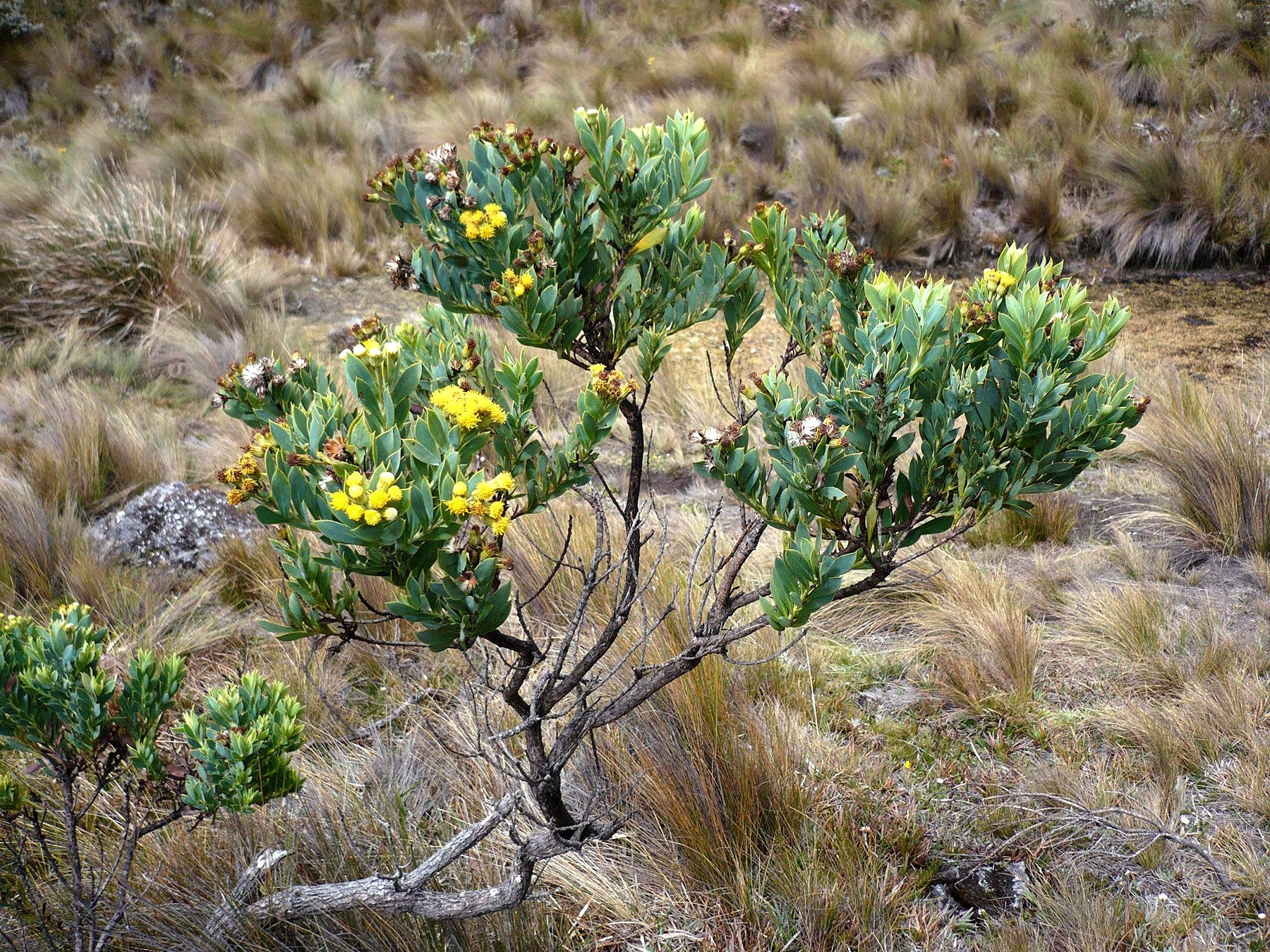
- Pentacalia vacciniodes

Scientific classification
- Kingdom: Plantae
- Clade: Tracheophytes
- Clade: Angiosperms
- Clade: Eudicots
- Clade: Asterids
- Order: Asterales
- Family: Asteraceae
- Subfamily: Asteroideae
- Tribe: Senecioneae
- Genus: Pentacalia; Cass.

= Pentacalia =

Genus of flowering plants

Pentacalia is a genus of flowering plants in the family Asteraceae. About 34 members of this genus appear to be located in the South American country Ecuador, where they are threatened by habitat loss. The genus contains approximately two hundred species, which are distributed from Mexico to northern South America.

== Species of Pentacalia ==
154 species are accepted by Plants of the World Online as of July 2025.

- Pentacalia aedoi J.Calvo & Buira
- Pentacalia albotecta (Cuatrec.) Cuatrec.
- Pentacalia andrei (Greenm.) Cuatrec.
- Pentacalia arborea (Kunth) H.Rob. & Cuatrec.
- Pentacalia aschersoniana (Hieron.) Cuatrec.
- Pentacalia asplundii (Cabrera) Cuatrec.
- Pentacalia atrovinosa J.Calvo & Á.J.Pérez
- Pentacalia axillariflora S.Díaz & Pedraza
- Pentacalia bacopoides (Greenm. & Cuatrec.) Cuatrec.
- Pentacalia badilloi (Cuatrec.) Cuatrec.
- Pentacalia balsasana Cuatrec. & H.Rob.
- Pentacalia basitruncata J.Calvo & H.Beltrán
- Pentacalia beckii (Cabrera) Cuatrec.
- Pentacalia brenesii (Greenm. & Standl.) Pruski
- Pentacalia breviligulata (Hieron.) Cuatrec.
- Pentacalia buchtienii (Greenm.) Cuatrec.
- Pentacalia cadiriensis (Cuatrec.) Cuatrec.
- Pentacalia caliana (Cuatrec.) Cuatrec.
- Pentacalia calyculata (Greenm. ex Donn.Sm.) H.Rob. & Cuatrec.
- Pentacalia candelariae (Oerst.) H.Rob. & Cuatrec.
- Pentacalia caracasana (Klatt) Cuatrec.
- Pentacalia cardenasiana Lapp & Torrec.
- Pentacalia cardenasii (Cuatrec.) Cuatrec.
- Pentacalia carmelitana S.Díaz & Rodr.-Cabeza
- Pentacalia carpishensis (Cuatrec.) Cuatrec.
- Pentacalia celicana J.Calvo & G.Benítez
- Pentacalia chaquiroensis (Greenm.) Cuatrec.
- Pentacalia chiribogae (Cabrera) A.Granda & J.Calvo
- Pentacalia cobrensis (Cuatrec.) Cuatrec.
- Pentacalia comarapensis (Cabrera) Cuatrec.
- Pentacalia corazonensis (Hieron.) Cuatrec. (synonym Pentacalia campii (Cuatrec.) Cuatrec.)
- Pentacalia cuatrecasasiana S.Díaz
- Pentacalia cutervonis H.Rob. & Cuatrec.
- Pentacalia danielis (Cuatrec.) Cuatrec.
- Pentacalia davidsmithii H.Rob. & Cuatrec.
- Pentacalia decomposita (Sch.Bip. ex Hieron.) Cuatrec.
- Pentacalia desiderabilis (Vell.) Cuatrec.
- Pentacalia diamantensis (Cuatrec.) Cuatrec.
- Pentacalia dictyophlebia (Greenm.) Cuatrec.
- Pentacalia diplostephioides (Cuatrec.) Cuatrec.
- Pentacalia disciformis (Hieron.) Cuatrec.
- Pentacalia divisoria (Cabrera) Cuatrec.
- Pentacalia dorrii H.Rob. & Cuatrec.
- Pentacalia ellipticifolia (Hieron.) Cuatrec.
- Pentacalia encanoana S.Díaz & G.P.Méndez
- Pentacalia epidendra (L.O.Williams) H.Rob. & Cuatrec.
- Pentacalia epiphytica (Kuntze) Cuatrec.
- Pentacalia floccosa (Britton) Cuatrec.
- Pentacalia floribunda Cuatrec.
- Pentacalia freemanii (Britton & Greenm.) Cuatrec.
- Pentacalia genuflexa (Greenm.) Cuatrec.
- Pentacalia gonocaulos (DC.) A.Granda & J.Calvo
- Pentacalia guambiana S.Díaz
- Pentacalia guanentana Rodr.-Cabeza & S.Díaz
- Pentacalia guerrerensis (T.M.Barkley) C.Jeffrey
- Pentacalia hachana (Cuatrec.) Cuatrec.
- Pentacalia haticoensis (Cuatrec.) Cuatrec.
- Pentacalia haughtii (Cuatrec.) Cuatrec.
- Pentacalia herzogii (Cabrera) Cuatrec.
- Pentacalia hillii (Greenm.) Cuatrec.
- Pentacalia huallagana (Cuatrec.) Cuatrec.
- Pentacalia huilensis (Cuatrec.) Cuatrec. (synonym Pentacalia carmelana H.Rob. & Cuatrec.)
- Pentacalia hurtadoi H.Rob. & Cuatrec.
- Pentacalia inornata H.Rob.
- Pentacalia involuta (Klatt) Cuatrec.
- Pentacalia jahnii (Cuatrec.) Cuatrec.
- Pentacalia jalcana (Cuatrec.) Cuatrec.
- Pentacalia jelskii (Hieron.) Cuatrec.
- Pentacalia lewisii H.Rob. & Cuatrec.
- Pentacalia lophophilus (Greenm.) Cuatrec.
- Pentacalia loretensis (Cuatrec.) Cuatrec.
- Pentacalia lucidissimus (Cuatrec.) Cuatrec.
- Pentacalia luteynorum H.Rob. & Cuatrec.
- Pentacalia magnusii (Hieron.) Cuatrec.
- Pentacalia matagalpensis H.Rob.
- Pentacalia maynasensis H.Rob. & Cuatrec.
- Pentacalia millei (Greenm.) Cuatrec. (synonym Pentacalia zamorana H.Rob. & Cuatrec.)
- Pentacalia morazensis (Greenm.) H.Rob. & Cuatrec.
- Pentacalia moronensis H.Rob. & Cuatrec.
- Pentacalia mucronatifolia H.Rob. & Cuatrec.
- Pentacalia napoensis H.Rob. & Cuatrec.
- Pentacalia neblinensis Pruski
- Pentacalia nordenstamii J.Calvo
- Pentacalia nunezii H.Rob. & Cuatrec.
- Pentacalia ochracea J.Calvo & H.Beltrán
- Pentacalia odorata S.Díaz & G.P.Méndez
- Pentacalia oellgaardii J.Calvo
- Pentacalia oronocensis (DC.) Cuatrec. (synonym Pentacalia gibbiflora (Cuatrec.) Cuatrec.)
- Pentacalia paipana Rodr.-Cabeza & S.Díaz
- Pentacalia palaciosii H.Rob. & Cuatrec.
- Pentacalia parasitica (Hemsl.) H.Rob. & Cuatrec.
- Pentacalia pavonii (Wedd.) Cuatrec.
- Pentacalia petiolincrassata (Cabrera & Zardini) H.Beltrán
- Pentacalia phanerandra (Cufod.) H.Rob. & Cuatrec.
- Pentacalia phelpsiae (Cuatrec.) Cuatrec.
- Pentacalia phorodendroides (L.O.Williams) H.Rob. & Cuatrec.
- Pentacalia pomacochana (Cuatrec.) Cuatrec.
- Pentacalia popayanensis (Hieron.) Cuatrec.
- Pentacalia poyasensis (Cuatrec.) Cuatrec.
- Pentacalia psidiifolia (Rusby) Cuatrec.
- Pentacalia ptariana (Cuatrec.) Cuatrec.
- Pentacalia purpurivenosa (Cuatrec.) Cuatrec.
- Pentacalia retroflexa S.Díaz
- Pentacalia ricoensis (Cuatrec.) Cuatrec.
- Pentacalia riotintis (Cuatrec.) Cuatrec.
- Pentacalia robertii S.Díaz & Obando
- Pentacalia ruficaulis (Greenm. & Cuatrec.) Cuatrec.
- Pentacalia rufohirsuta (Cabrera) Cuatrec.
- Pentacalia rugosa (Cuatrec.) Cuatrec.
- Pentacalia sabinoi Lapp
- Pentacalia sagasteguii H.Rob. & Cuatrec.
- Pentacalia scortifolia (Greenm.) Cuatrec.
- Pentacalia sevillana (Cuatrec.) Cuatrec. (synonym Pentacalia pailasensis H.Rob. & Cuatrec.)
- Pentacalia silvascandens (Cuatrec.) Cuatrec.
- Pentacalia sinforosi S.Díaz & G.P.Méndez
- Pentacalia sisavitensis S.Díaz & Obando
- Pentacalia sonsonensis (Cuatrec.) Cuatrec.
- Pentacalia stergiosii V.M.Badillo
- Pentacalia streptothamna (Greenm.) H.Rob. & Cuatrec.
- Pentacalia subdiscolor H.Rob.
- Pentacalia subglomerosa (Greenm.) Cuatrec.
- Pentacalia suboppositifolia (Cuatrec.) Cuatrec.
- Pentacalia supernitens (Cuatrec.) Cuatrec.
- Pentacalia sylvicola (Greenm.) Cuatrec.
- Pentacalia tablensis (Cabrera) Cuatrec.
- Pentacalia tarapotensis (Cabrera) Cuatrec.
- Pentacalia tatuyorum Lapp, Torrec. & O.Silva
- Pentacalia theifolia (Benth.) Cuatrec.
- Pentacalia tingoensis (Cabrera & Zardini) A.Granda & J.Calvo
- Pentacalia todziae H.Rob. & Cuatrec.
- Pentacalia tomasiana (Cuatrec.) Cuatrec.
- Pentacalia tonduzii (Greenm.) H.Rob. & Cuatrec.
- Pentacalia trianae (Klatt) Cuatrec.
- Pentacalia tropicalis (Cabrera) C.Jeffrey
- Pentacalia ucumariana S.Díaz & G.P.Méndez
- Pentacalia ullucosana (Hieron.) S.Díaz & Cuatrec.
- Pentacalia urbani (Hieron.) Cuatrec.
- Pentacalia uribei Cuatrec.
- Pentacalia urubambensis (Cabrera) Cuatrec.
- Pentacalia vallejiana Sagást. & E.Rodr.
- Pentacalia vargasiana (Cabrera) H.Rob. & Cuatrec.
- Pentacalia veleziae S.Díaz & Cuatrec.
- Pentacalia venturae (T.M.Barkley) C.Jeffrey
- Pentacalia viburnifolia J.Calvo & A.Fuentes
- Pentacalia vicelliptica (Cuatrec.) Cuatrec.
- Pentacalia vulpinaris (Cuatrec.) Cuatrec.
- Pentacalia weinmannifolia (Cuatrec.) Cuatrec.
- Pentacalia wilburii H.Rob.
- Pentacalia wurdackii (Cuatrec.) Cuatrec.
- Pentacalia xavialba Lapp & Morillo
- Pentacalia yanetharum S.Díaz & Obando
- Pentacalia yapacana (Aristeg.) Cuatrec.
- Pentacalia zakii H.Rob. & Cuatrec. (synonym Pentacalia cazaletii H.Rob. & Cuatrec.)
- Pentacalia zongoensis (Cabrera) J.Calvo
