= José Cuatrecasas =

Spanish-American pharmacist and botanist (1903–1996)

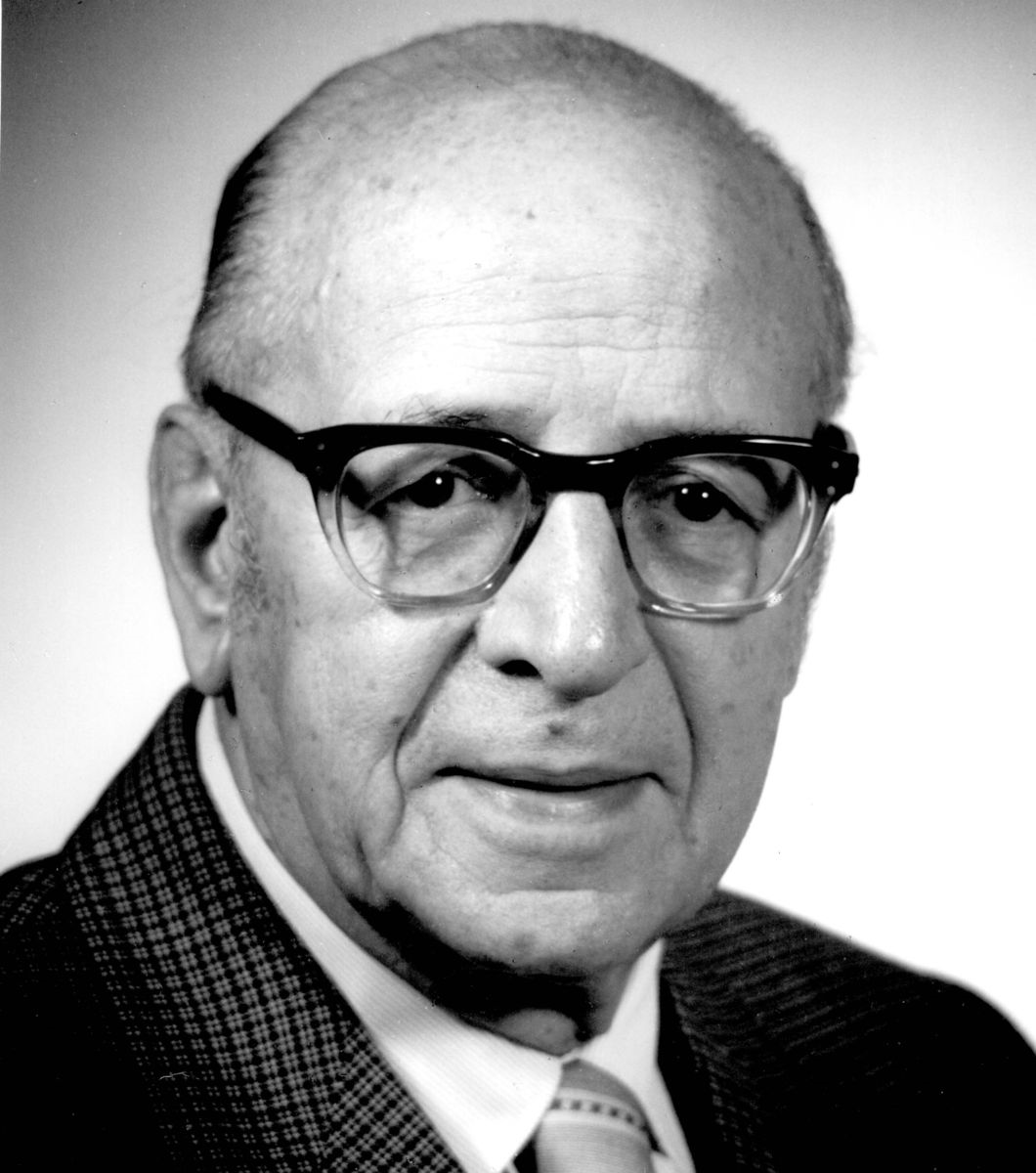
- Cuatrecasas in the 1970s
- Born: 1903
- Died: 1996
- Occupation: Botanist
- Scientific career
- Author abbrev. (botany): Cuatrec.

José Cuatrecasas (1903–1996) was a Spanish botanist. He was born on March 19, 1903, in Camprodon, Catalonia, Spain.

His research focused on the high-elevation páramo and sub-páramo regions of the Andes Mountains in South America, especially the flowering plant families Asteraceae and Malpighiaceae. He played an important role in the founding of the Organization for Flora Neotropica.

In 1997, the Smithsonian Institution established the José Cuatrecasas Botanical Fund to "support significant research projects that emulate the spirit of the research of José Cuatrecasas". The Smithsonian also awards a José Cuatrecasas Medal for Excellence in Tropical Botany annually.

== Honors ==
- 1950 Guggenheim Fellowship

Multiple plant species have been named for him, including Narcissus cuatrecasasii , Joseanthus cuatrecasasii, Pradosia cuatrecasasii, and Tessmannianthus quadridomius (where "quadridomius" is Latin for "cuatre casas").

== Sources ==
- Kirkbride, Ma Cristina Garcia. "José Cuatrecasas (1903-1996)". Taxon, Vol. 46, No. 1 (February 1997), pp. 132–134.
- "Botanical Endowment at Smithsonian", Biological Conservation Newsletter, No. 170 (August 1997)
