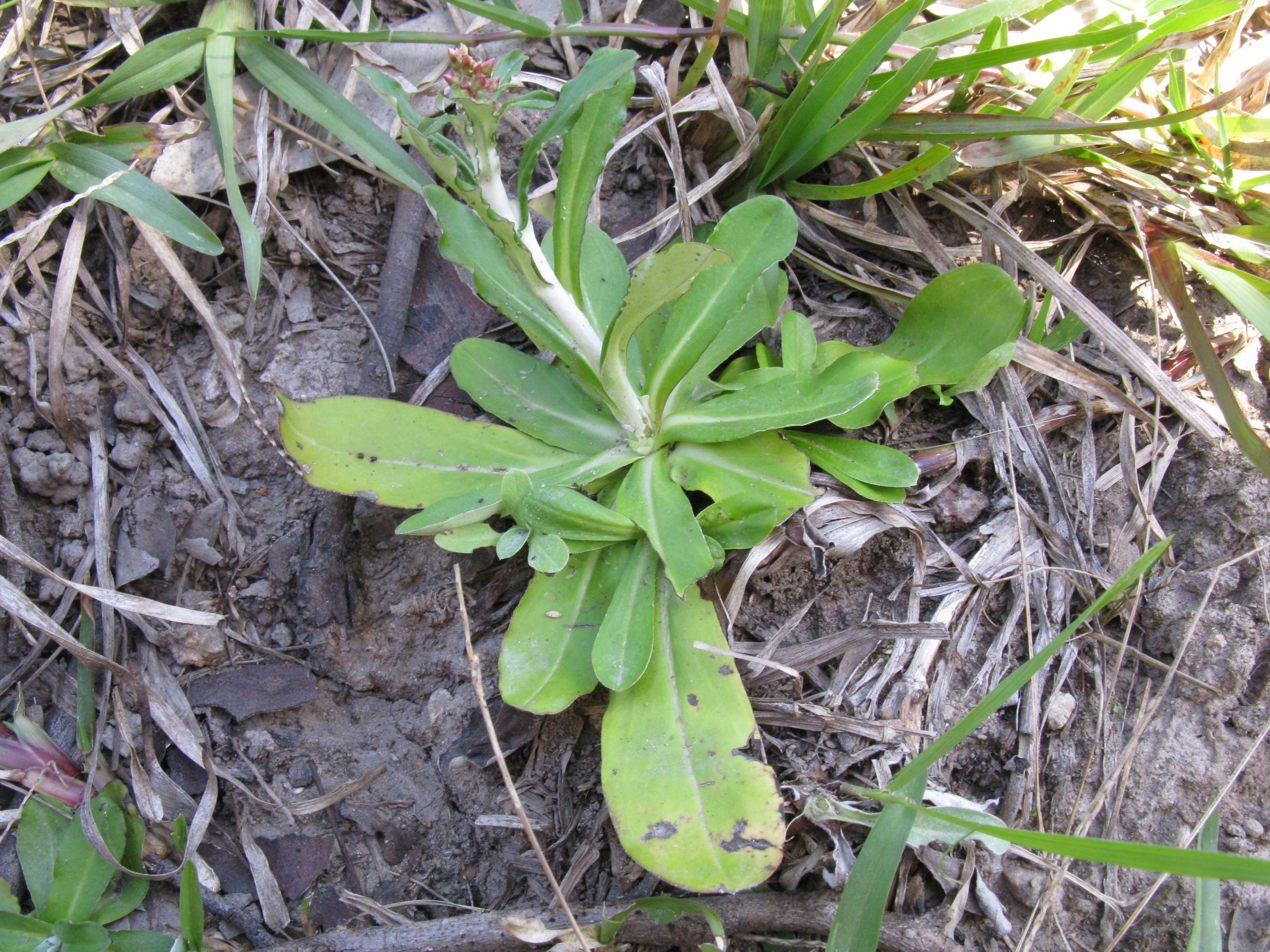

Scientific classification
- Kingdom: Plantae
- Clade: Tracheophytes
- Clade: Angiosperms
- Clade: Eudicots
- Clade: Asterids
- Order: Asterales
- Family: Asteraceae
- Genus: Gamochaeta
- Species: G. coarctata

Binomial name
- Gamochaeta coarctata (Willd.) Kerguélen 1987

Synonyms
- Synonymy: Gnaphalium coarctatum Willd. 1803; Gamochaeta spicata (Lam.) Cabrera; Gnaphalium purpureum var. americanum (Mill.) Klatt; Gnaphalium purpureum var. spicatum (Lam.) Klatt; Gnaphalium radians var. spicatum (Lam.) Klatt; Gnaphalium spicatum Lam. 1788 not Mill. 1768

= Gamochaeta coarctata =

Species of flowering plant

Gamochaeta coarctata, the gray everlasting (also known as cudweed, like other members of its genus), is a species of flowering plant in the family Asteraceae. It is widespread in South America (from Colombia to Uruguay) and naturalized in parts of Eurasia, Australia, and North America.

Gamochaeta coarctata is an annual herb up to 15 cm (5.9 in) tall. Leaves are up to 3 cm (1.2 in) long. The plant forms many small flower heads in elongated arrays. Each head contains 2–4 yellow disc flowers but no ray flowers.

Some specimens collected in the United States were formerly misidentified as G. americana, which does not grow in the United States.
