= Narrowleaf purple everlasting =

Narrowleaf purple everlasting is a common name for two closely related plants which are often confused with each other:

- Gamochaeta calviceps, native to South America and the southeastern United States
- Gamochaeta falcata, native to Guatemala, Mexico, and the southwestern United States
