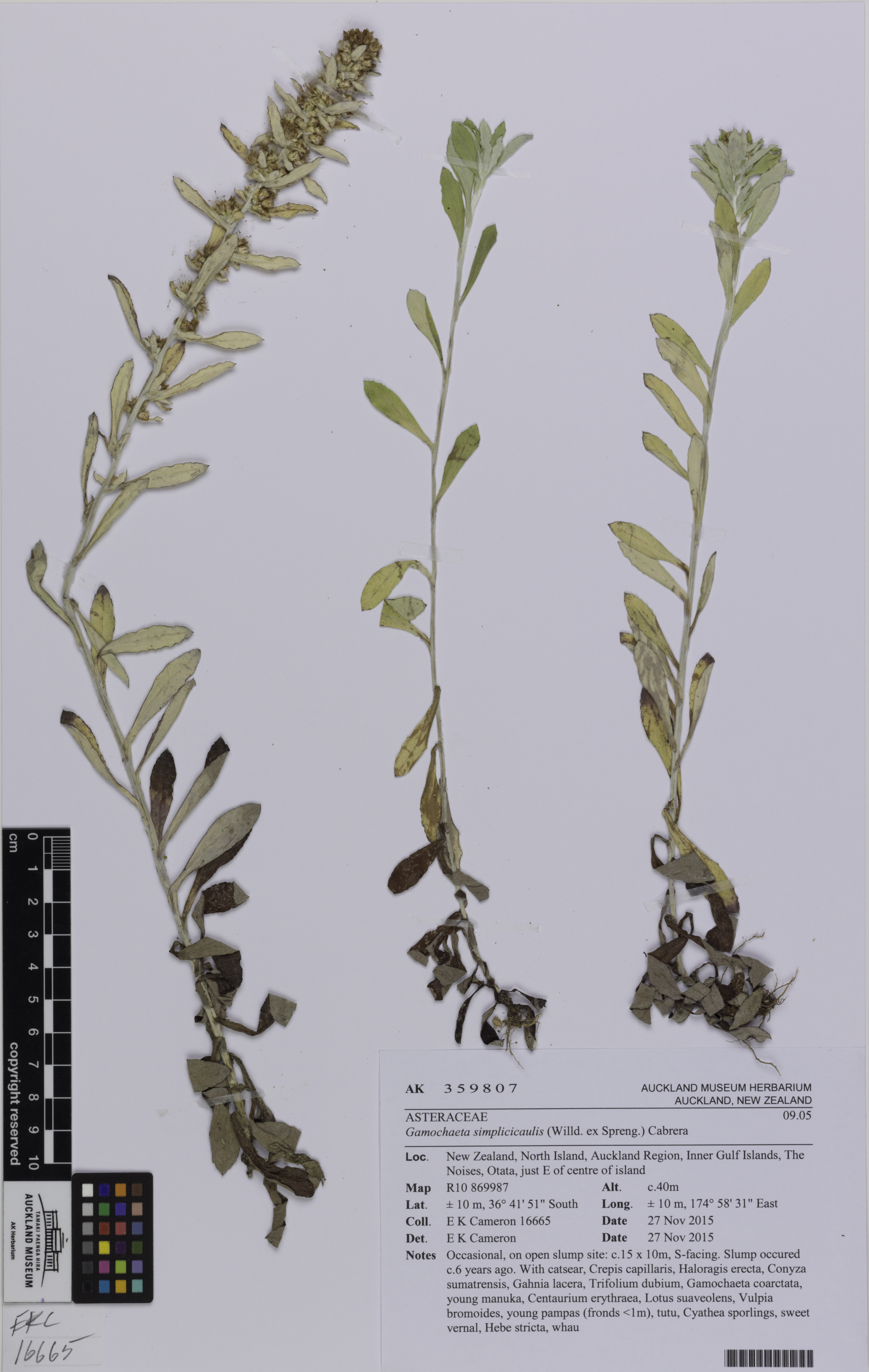

Scientific classification
- Kingdom: Plantae
- Clade: Tracheophytes
- Clade: Angiosperms
- Clade: Eudicots
- Clade: Asterids
- Order: Asterales
- Family: Asteraceae
- Genus: Gamochaeta
- Species: G. simplicicaulis

Binomial name
- Gamochaeta simplicicaulis (Willd. ex Spreng.) Cabrera 1961

Synonyms
- Gnaphalium simplicicaule Willd. ex Spreng. 1826; Gnaphalium purpureum var. simplicicaule (Willd. ex Spreng.) Klatt

= Gamochaeta simplicicaulis =

Species of flowering plant

Gamochaeta simplicicaulis, the simple-stem cudweed or simple-stem everlasting, is a species of flowering plant in the family Asteraceae. It is native to South America and has become naturalized in Australia, New Zealand, and the southeastern United States (from Alabama to Virginia).

Gamochaeta simplicicaulis is an annual herb up to 85 cm (33 in) tall. Leaves are up to 9 cm (3.5 in) long, green and hairless on the upper surface but appearing white on the underside because of many woolly hairs. The plant forms many small flower heads in elongated arrays and also in tightly packed clumps. Each head contains 2–3 yellow disc flowers but no ray flowers.
