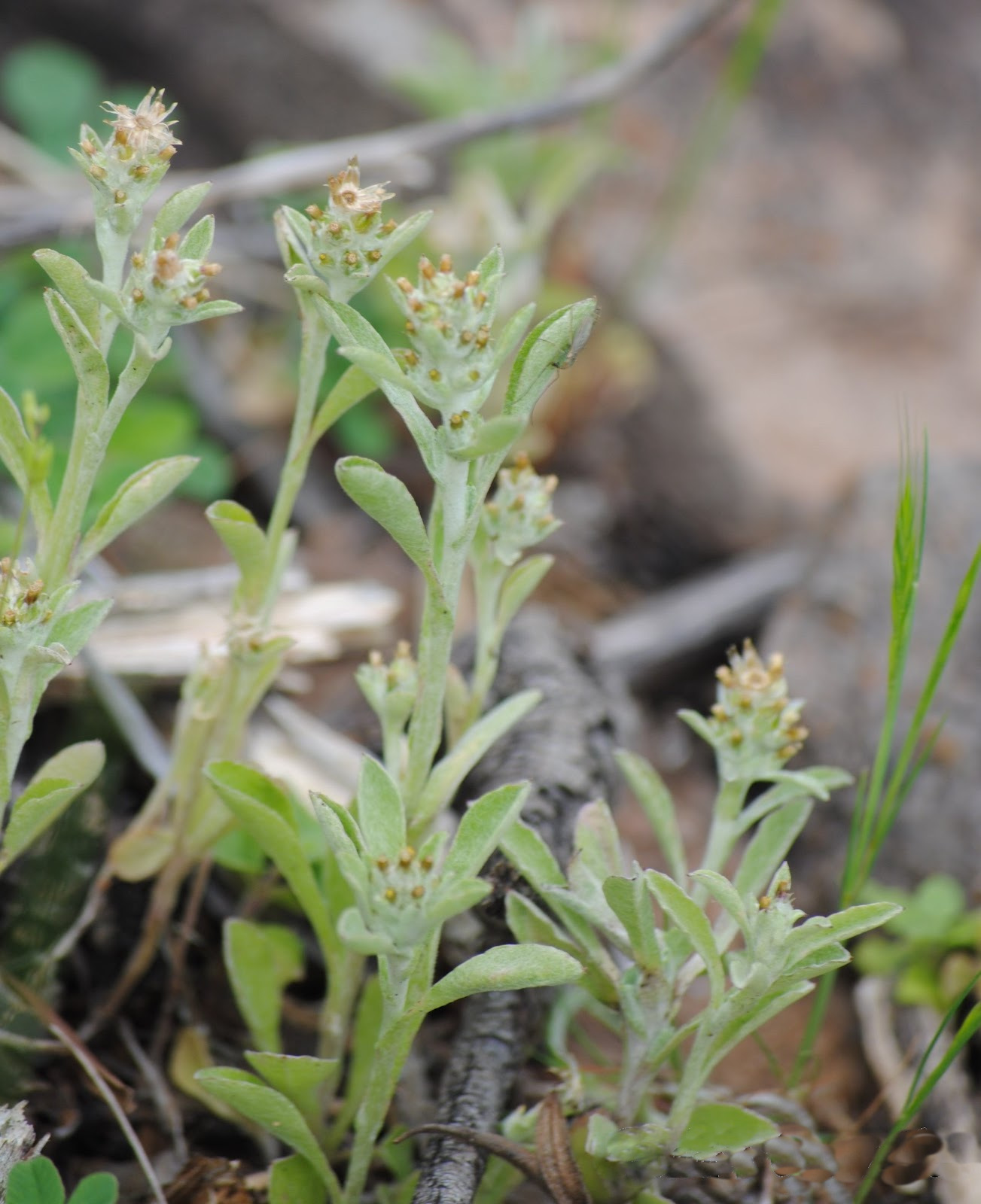

Scientific classification
- Kingdom: Plantae
- Clade: Embryophytes
- Clade: Tracheophytes
- Clade: Spermatophytes
- Clade: Angiosperms
- Clade: Eudicots
- Clade: Asterids
- Order: Asterales
- Family: Asteraceae
- Genus: Gamochaeta
- Species: G. pensylvanica

Binomial name
- Gamochaeta pensylvanica (Willd.) Cabrera

Synonyms
- Gnaphalium spathulatum Lam. 1809, illegitimate homonym not Burm.f. 1768; Gnaphalium pensylvanicum Willd.; Gnaphalium purpureum subsp. pensylvanicum (Willd.) O. Bolòs & Vigo; Gnaphalium peregrinum Fernald

= Gamochaeta pensylvanica =

Species of flowering plant

Gamochaeta pensylvanica, the Pennsylvania cudweed or Pennsylvania everlasting, is a widespread species of flowering plant in the family Asteraceae. It is native to South America and introduced into Eurasia, Africa, Australia, and North America. The pensylvanica epithet is a misnomer, as the plant is not native to Pennsylvania and only marginally naturalized there.

Gamochaeta pensylvanica is an annual herb up to 50 cm (20 in) tall. Leaves are up to 7 cm (2.8 in) long, light green because of woolly hairs on the surfaces (though not as dense as in some related species). The plant forms many small flower heads in elongated arrays. Each head contains 3–4 purple disc flowers but no ray flowers.

== Gallery ==
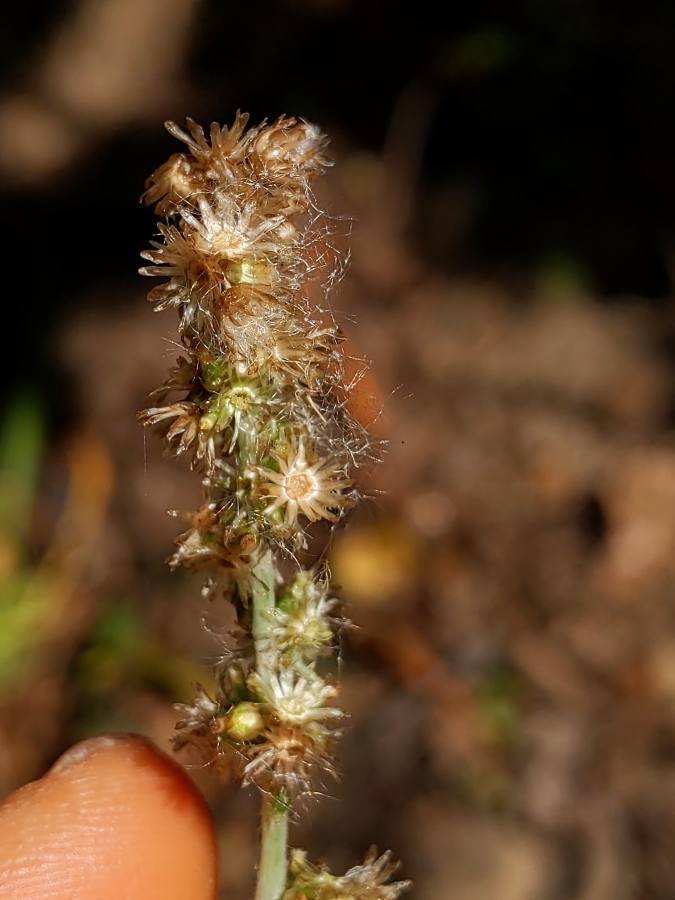
Flower

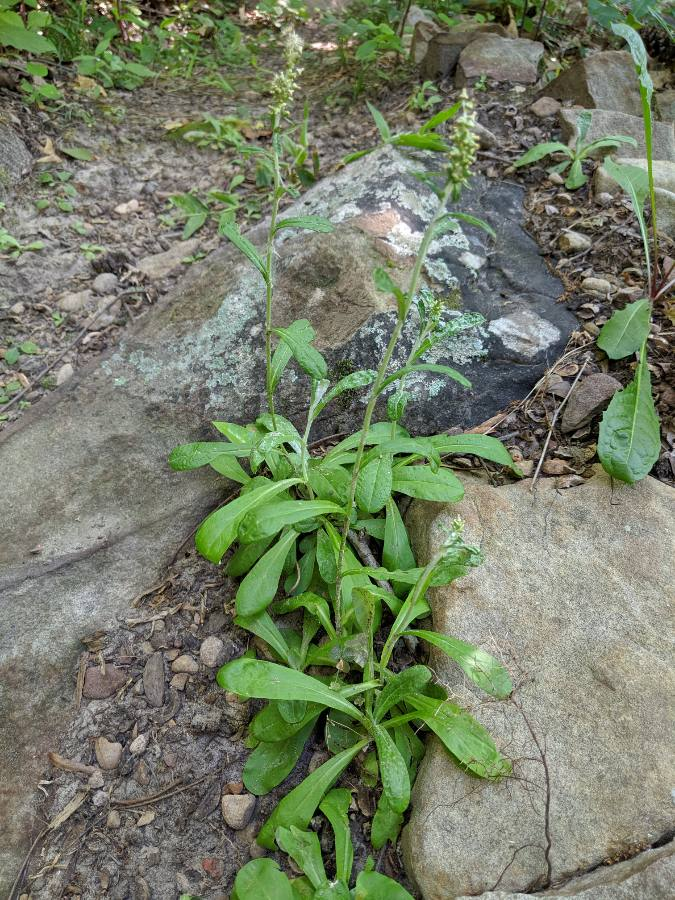
Plant with flowers
