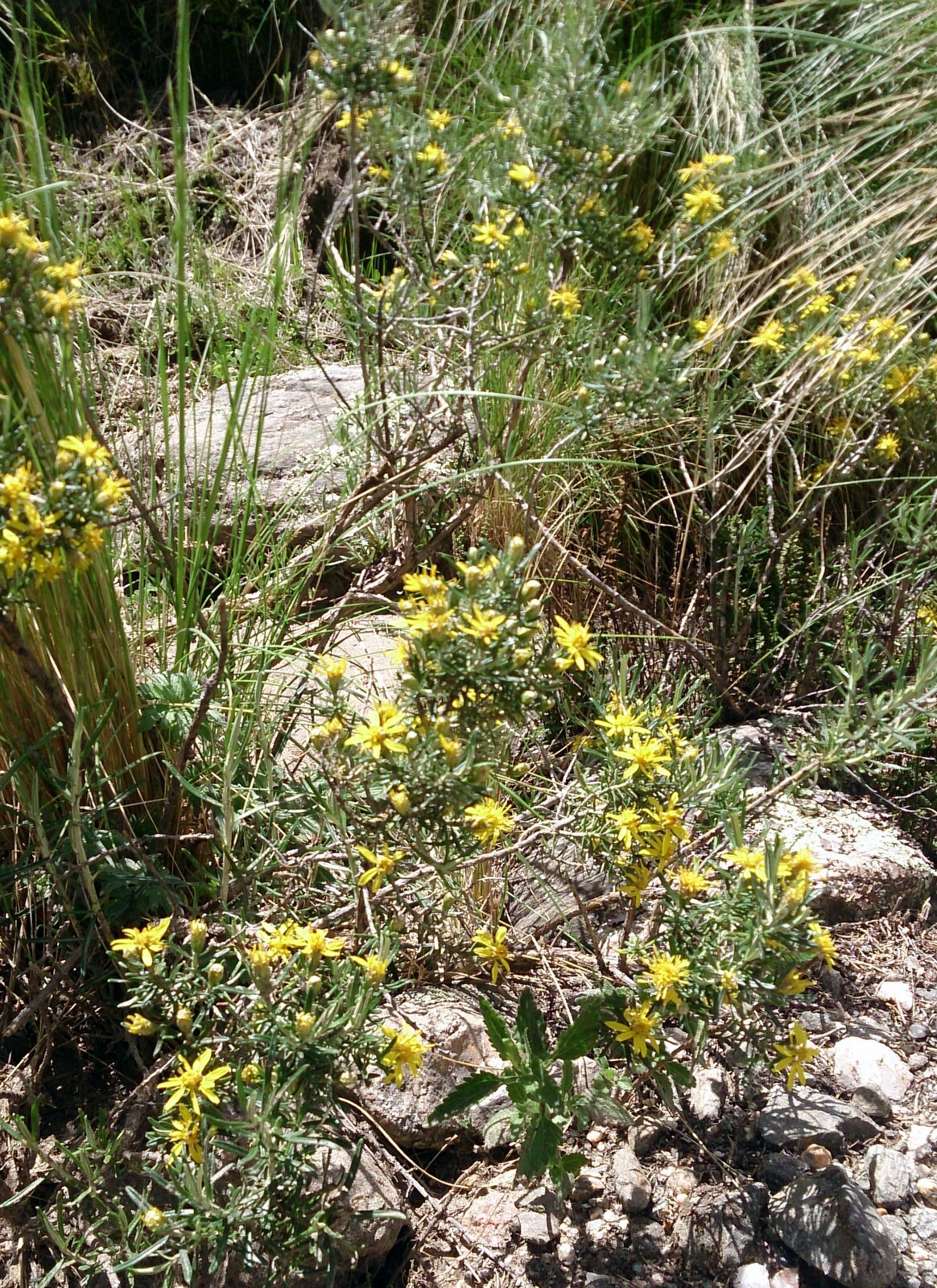
- Chiliotrichiopsis keidelii in Argentina

Scientific classification
- Kingdom: Plantae
- Clade: Embryophytes
- Clade: Tracheophytes
- Clade: Spermatophytes
- Clade: Angiosperms
- Clade: Eudicots
- Clade: Asterids
- Order: Asterales
- Family: Asteraceae
- Subfamily: Asteroideae
- Tribe: Astereae
- Subtribe: Chiliotrichinae
- Genus: Chiliotrichiopsis; Cabrera

Type species
- Chiliotrichiopsis keideli Cabrera

= Chiliotrichiopsis =

Genus of flowering plants

Chiliotrichiopsis is a genus of flowering plants in the family Asteraceae. It is native to the Andes, where it is distributed in Peru, Bolivia, and Argentina. Species occur in the mountains up to 4200 meters in elevation.

These are members of the Chiliotrichum Group in the tribe Astereae of the aster family, a group of related South American "shrubby daisies". Chiliotrichiopsis species are densely branched, rounded shrubs. The branches are ribbed, glandular, and coated in woolly hairs. The alternately arranged leaves are linear to oval in shape with rolled edges and hairy undersides. The flower heads are solitary or occasionally in clusters of 3 or 4. Each head is cylindrical to bell-shaped with layers of wooly-haired, gland-dotted phyllaries. Two species have yellow ray florets with staminodes, and one lacks ray florets. The center of the head is filled with several tubular yellow disc florets. The fruit is a hairy, glandular achene with a pappus of scales.

Accepted species

- Chiliotrichiopsis keidelii (Argentina, Bolivia)
- Chiliotrichiopsis ledifolia (Argentina)
- Chiliotrichiopsis mendocina (Argentina)
- Chiliotrichiopsis peruviana (Peru)
