= Trisetaria aurea =

Scientific classification
- Kingdom: Plantae
- Clade: Tracheophytes
- Clade: Angiosperms
- Clade: Monocots
- Clade: Commelinids
- Order: Poales
- Family: Poaceae
- Subfamily: Pooideae
- Genus: Trisetaria
- Species: T. aurea

Binomial name
- Trisetaria aurea (Ten.) Pignatti ex Kerguélen

Synonyms
- List: Avena chlorantha Link; Avena condensata Link; Avena noeana (Boiss.) Nyman; Avena sicula Spreng.; Koeleria aurea Ten.; Koeleria glabra Gaudich. ex Steud.; Trisetum aureum (Ten.) Ten.; Trisetum chloranthum (Link) Steud.; Trisetum condensatum (Link) J.Presl ex Schult.; Trisetum melitense Steud.; Trisetum noeanum Boiss.

Species of plant

Trisetaria aurea, the golden oatgrass, is a species of annual grass in the family Poaceae (true grasses). It is native to the Balearic Islands, Italy (including Sicily), Malta, the former Yugoslavia, Albania, Greece, and Turkey (including the European portion), and has been introduced to the US state of New Jersey.
