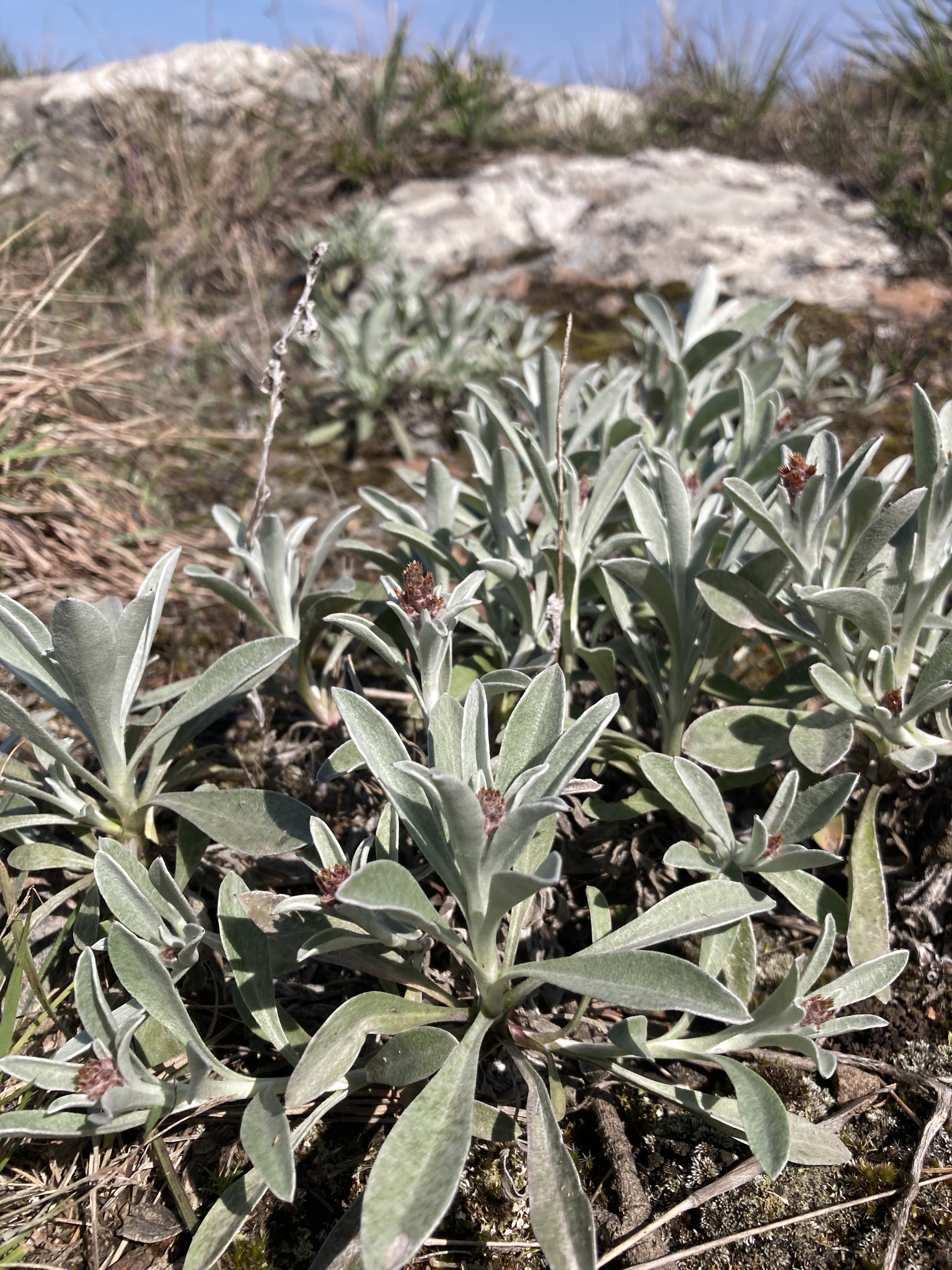

Scientific classification
- Kingdom: Plantae
- Clade: Tracheophytes
- Clade: Angiosperms
- Clade: Eudicots
- Clade: Asterids
- Order: Asterales
- Family: Asteraceae
- Genus: Gamochaeta
- Species: G. stachydifolia

Binomial name
- Gamochaeta stachydifolia (Lam.) Cabrera

Synonyms
- Gnaphalium stachydifolium Lam. 1788; Gnaphalium stachidifolium Lam. 1788; Gnaphalium purpureum var. stachydifolium (Lam.) Baker; Gnaphalium radians var. stachidifolium Baker

= Gamochaeta stachydifolia =

Species of flowering plant

Gamochaeta stachydifolia is a species of flowering plant in the family Asteraceae. It is native to South America (Chile, Argentina, Brazil, Uruguay) and naturalized in parts of California.

Gamochaeta stachydifolia is an annual herb up to 15 cm (5.9 in) tall. Leaves are up to 3 cm (1.2 in) long. The plant forms many small flower heads in elongated arrays. Each head contains 2–4 yellow disc flowers but no ray flowers.
