= Owl's crown =

Owl's crown is a common name for several plants and may refer to:

- Gamochaeta sphacelata, native to South America, Central America, and Mexico
- Gnaphalium sylvaticum, native to Europe
