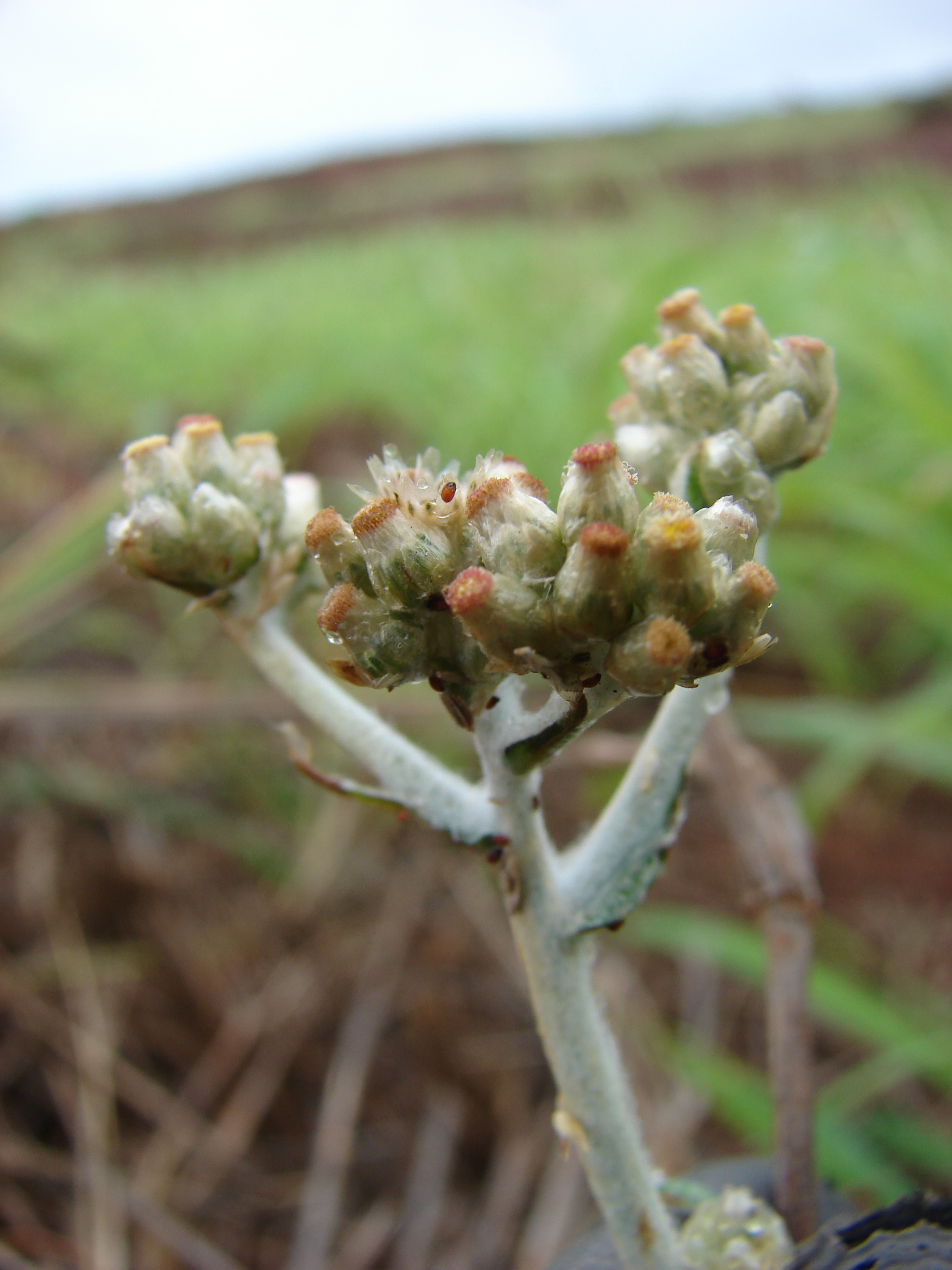

Scientific classification
- Kingdom: Plantae
- Clade: Tracheophytes
- Clade: Angiosperms
- Clade: Eudicots
- Clade: Asterids
- Order: Asterales
- Family: Asteraceae
- Genus: Gamochaeta
- Species: G. purpurea

Binomial name
- Gamochaeta purpurea (L.) Cabrera

Synonyms
- Gnaphalium purpureum

= Gamochaeta purpurea =

Species of flowering plant

Gamochaeta purpurea, the purple cudweed, purple everlasting, or spoonleaf purple everlasting, is a plant native to North America.

== Description ==
It is a small annual herb that produces lanceolate, alternate, wooly leaves and peg-shaped flowerheads in terminal clusters. The seeds are windborne. It can reach a height of approximately 0.4 meters (1.25 feet).

== Habitat ==
It can grow on most any type of soil that is moderately moist, but prefers meadows, rocky terrain, and farmland.

== Conservation status in the United States ==
It is listed as endangered in Massachusetts and New York, as possibly extirpated in Maine, as historical in Rhode Island, and as a special concern species in Connecticut, where it is believed extirpated.

== Ethnobotany ==
The Houma people take a decoction of the dried plant for colds and influenza.

== Gallery ==
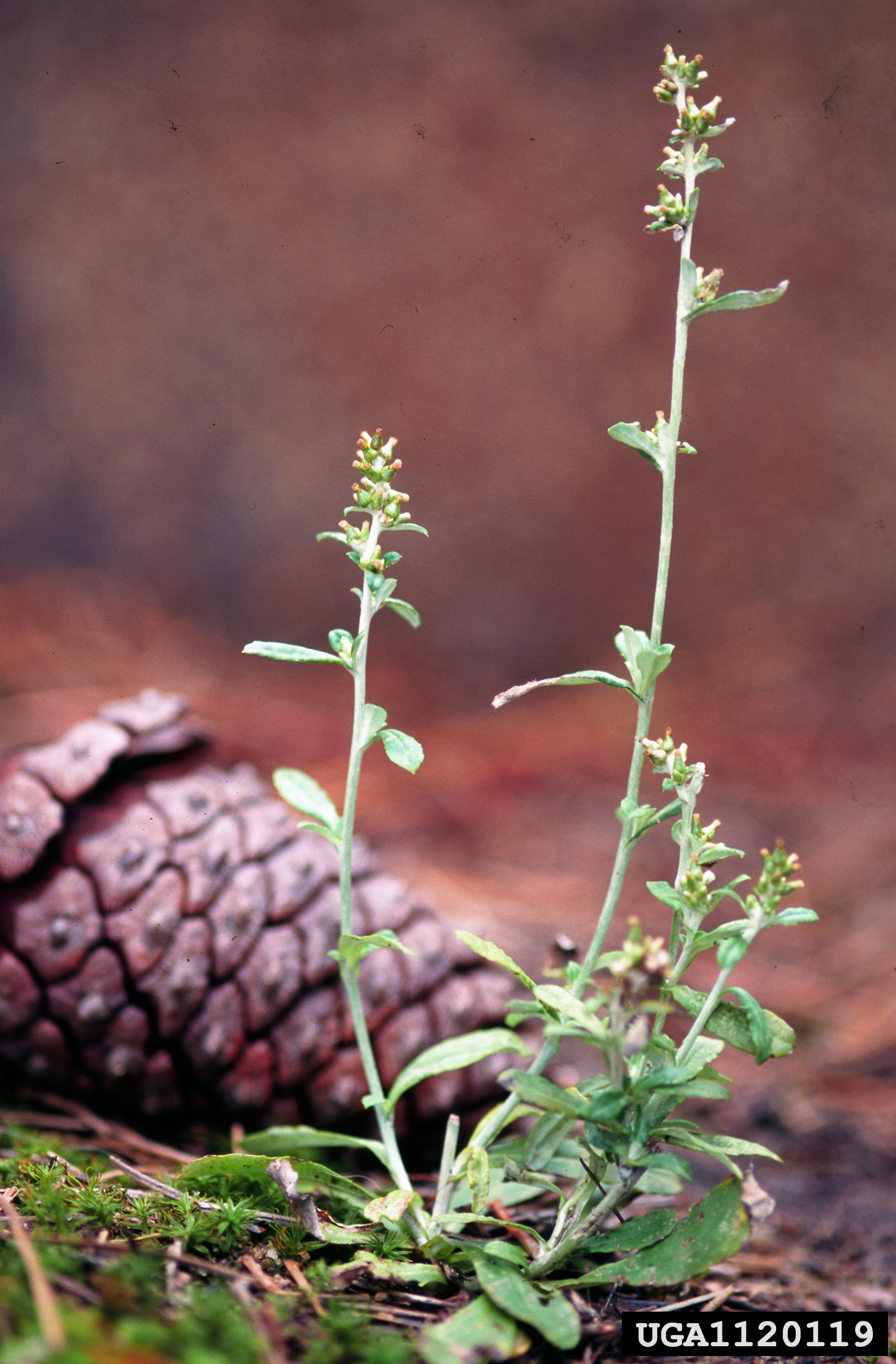
Habit

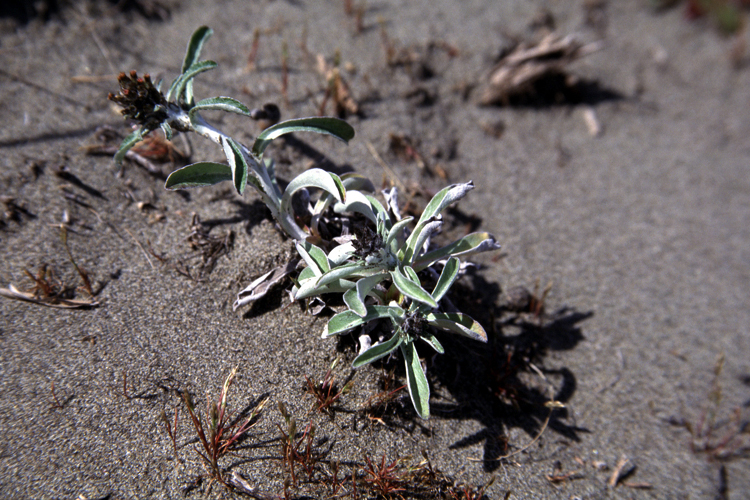

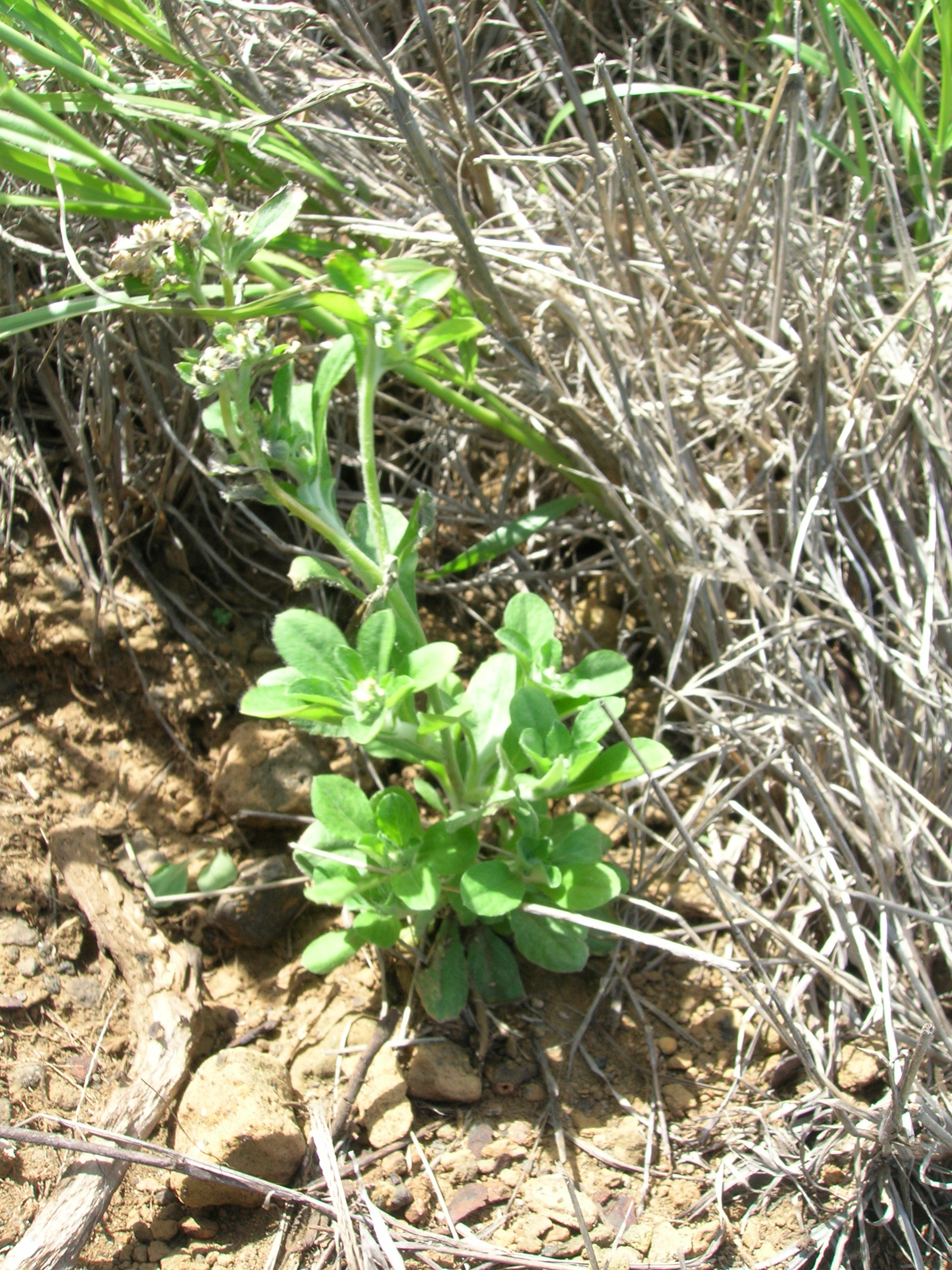

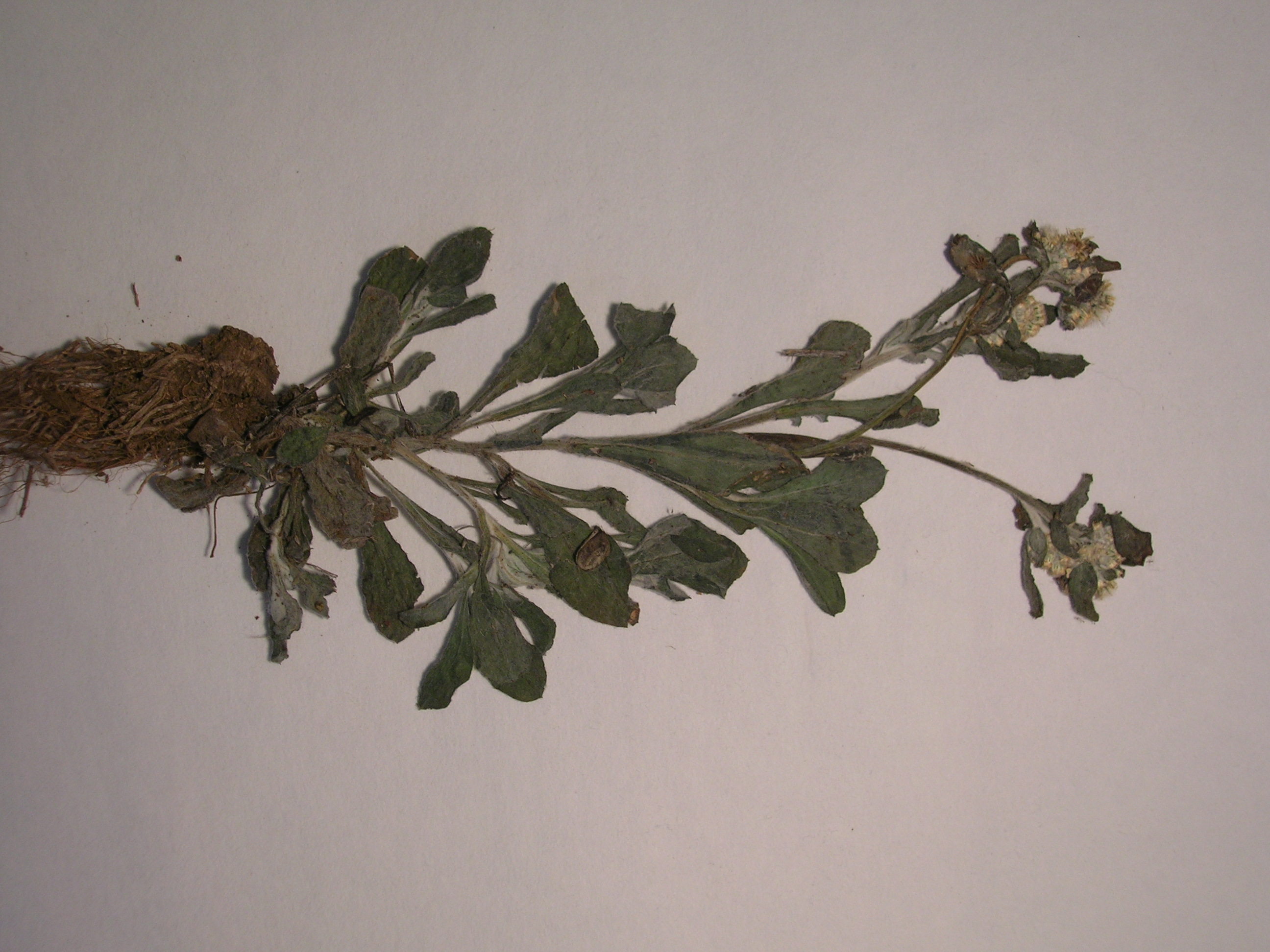

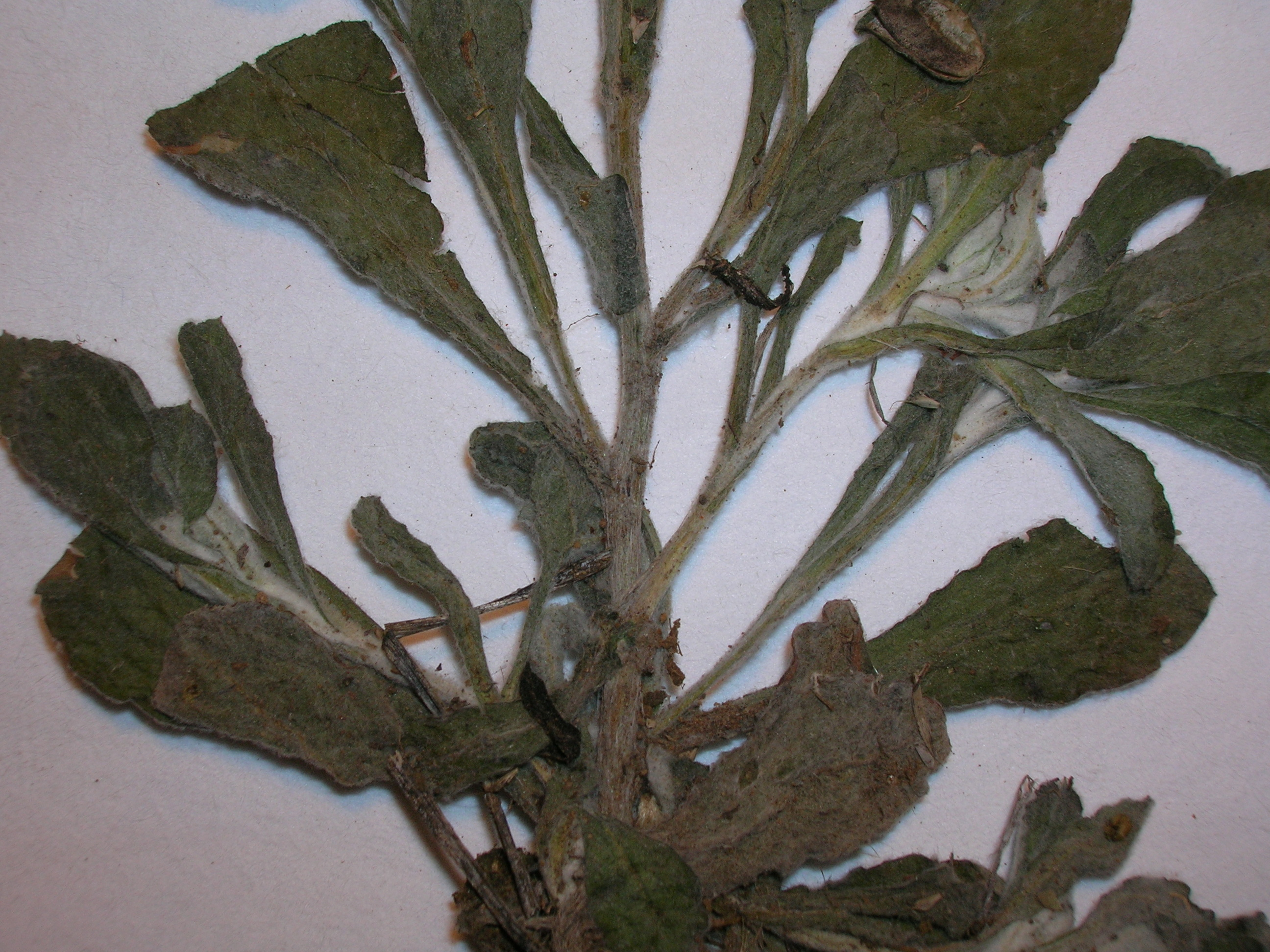

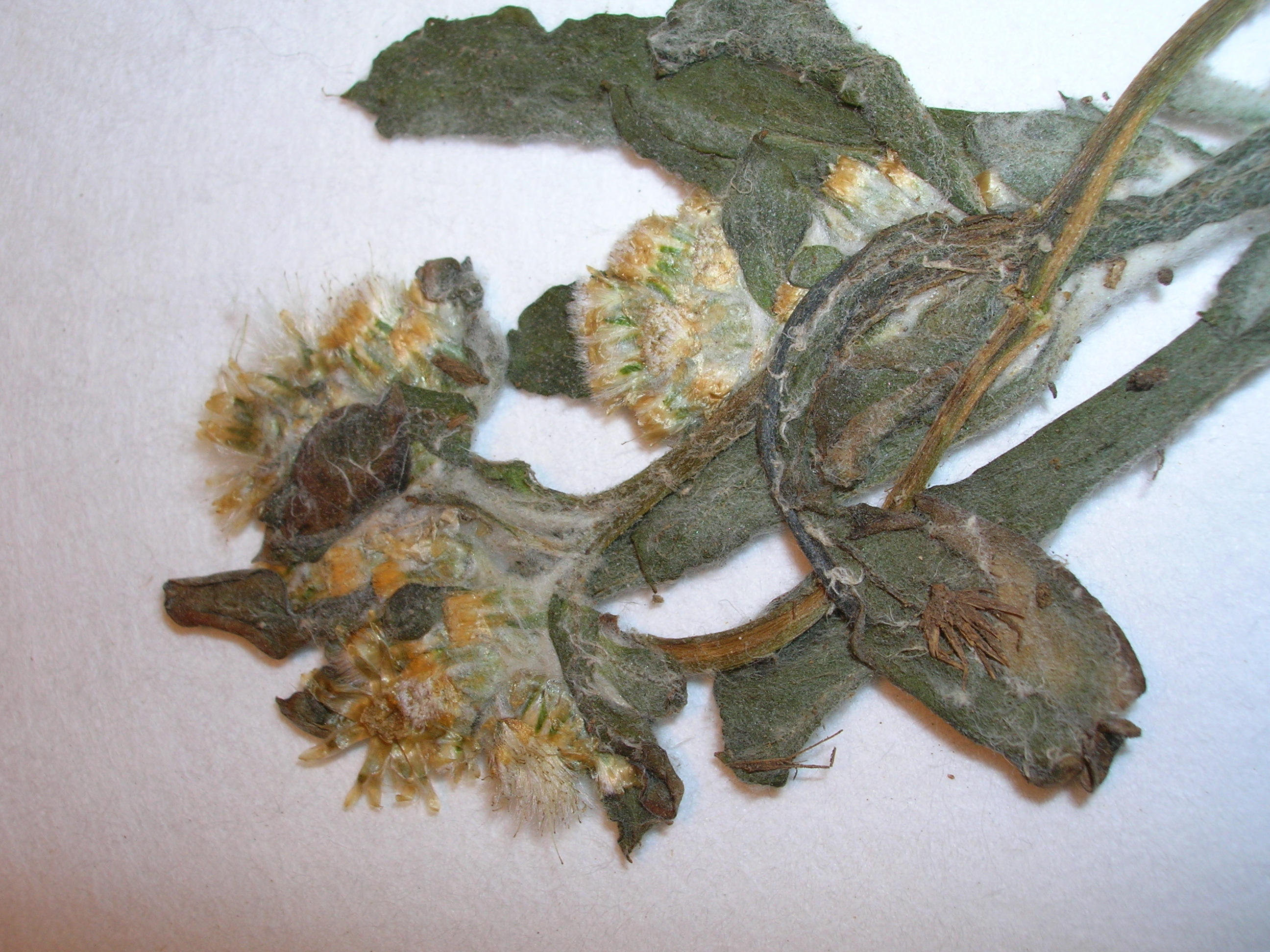

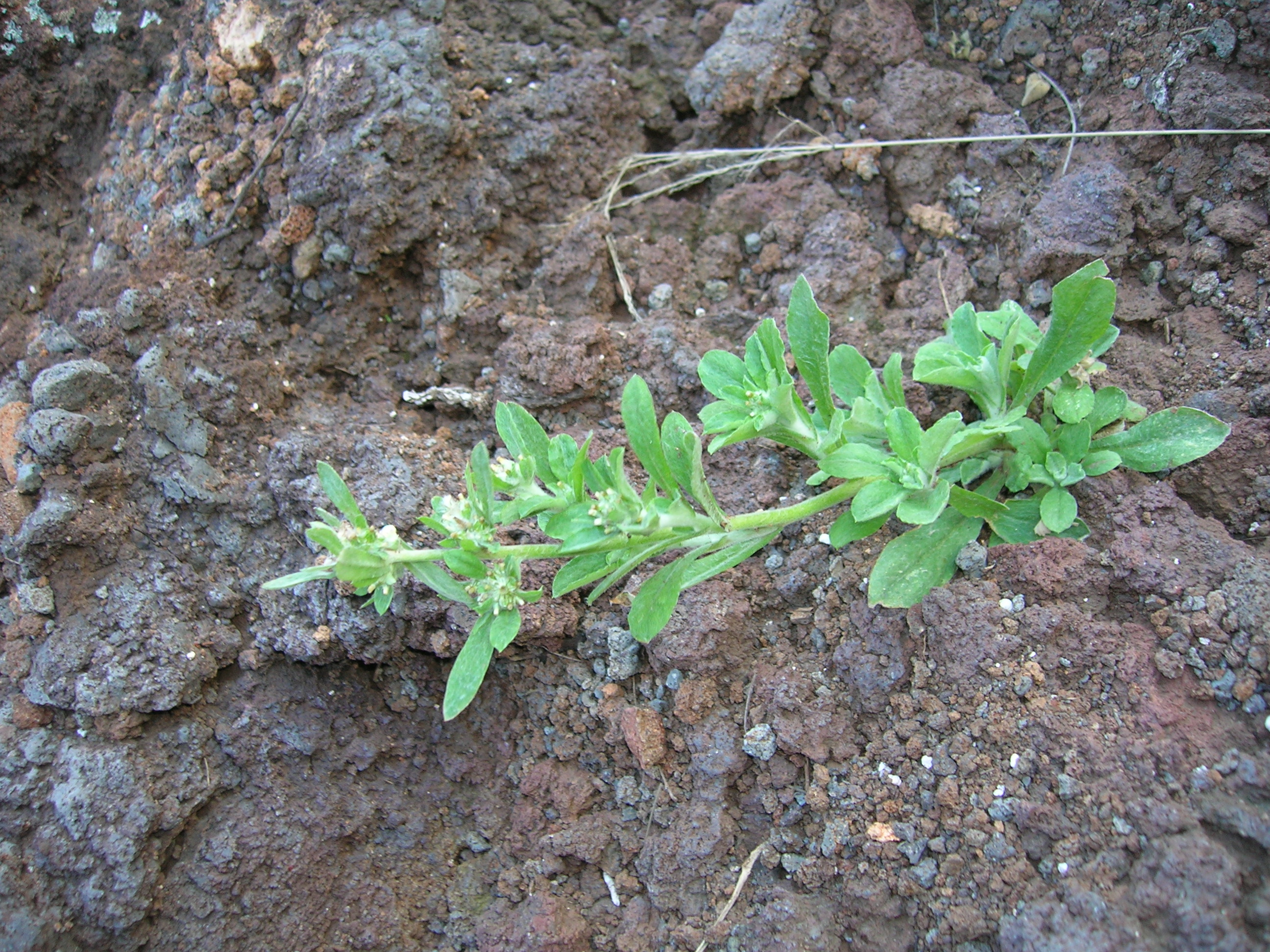

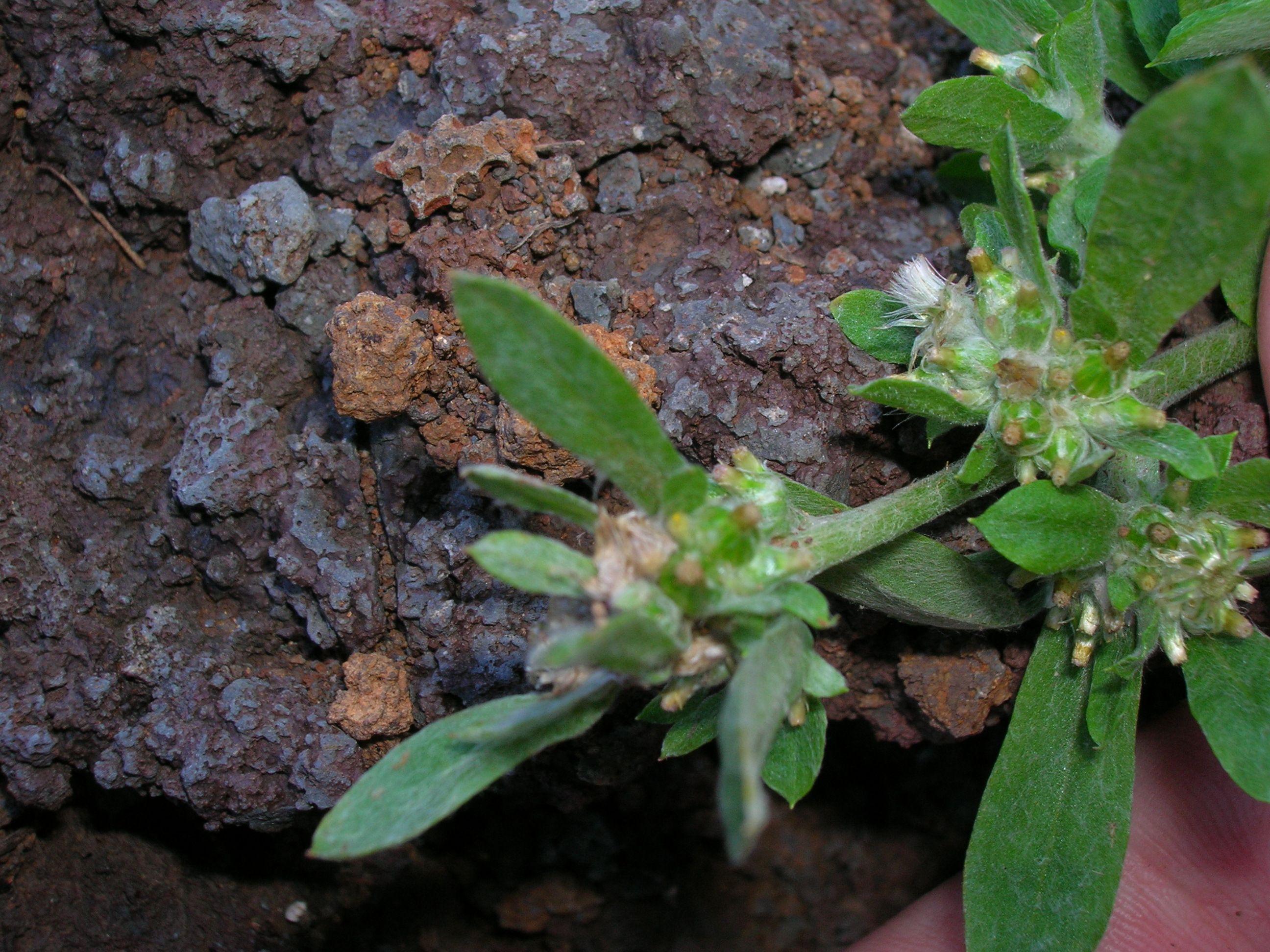

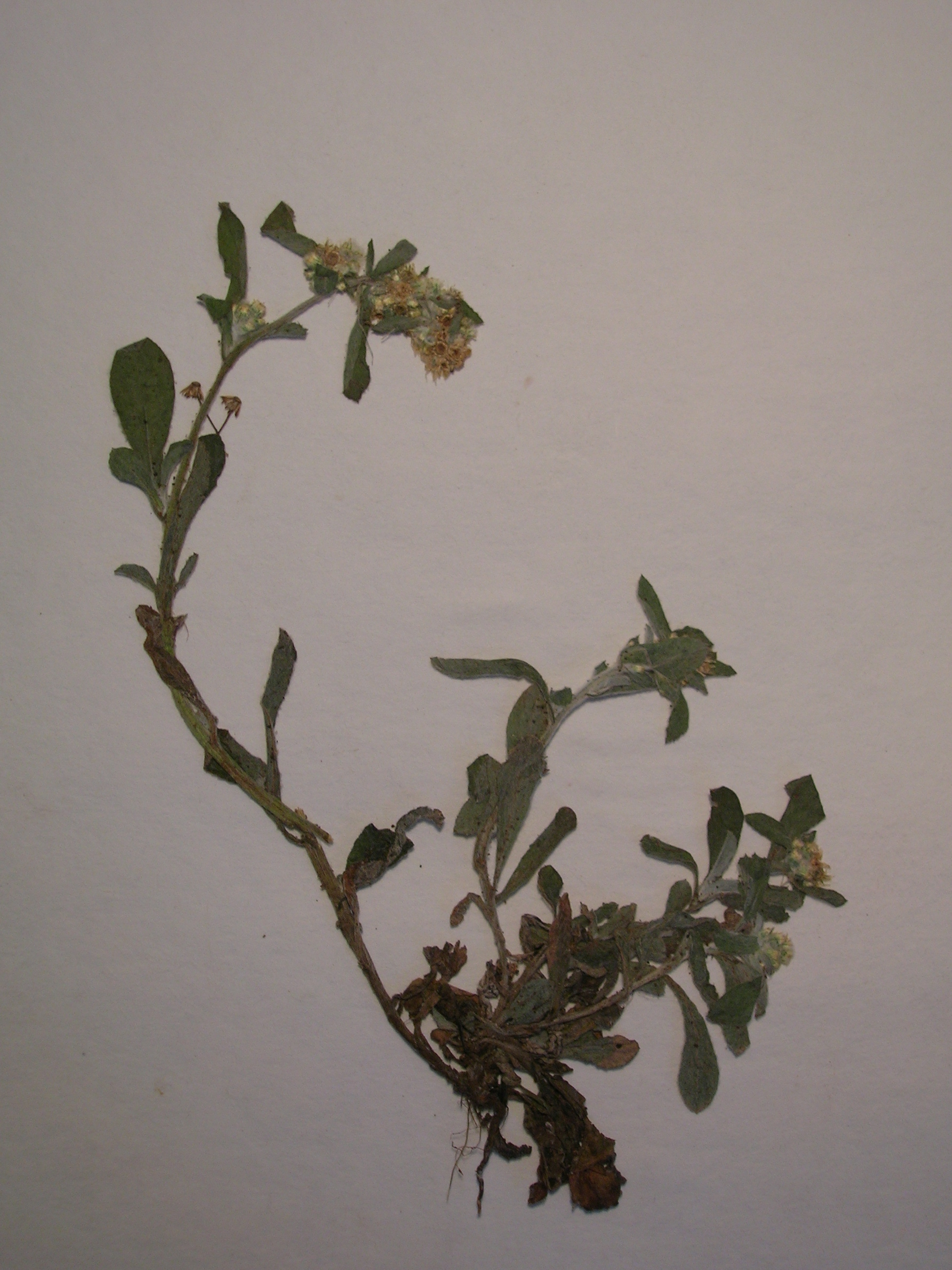

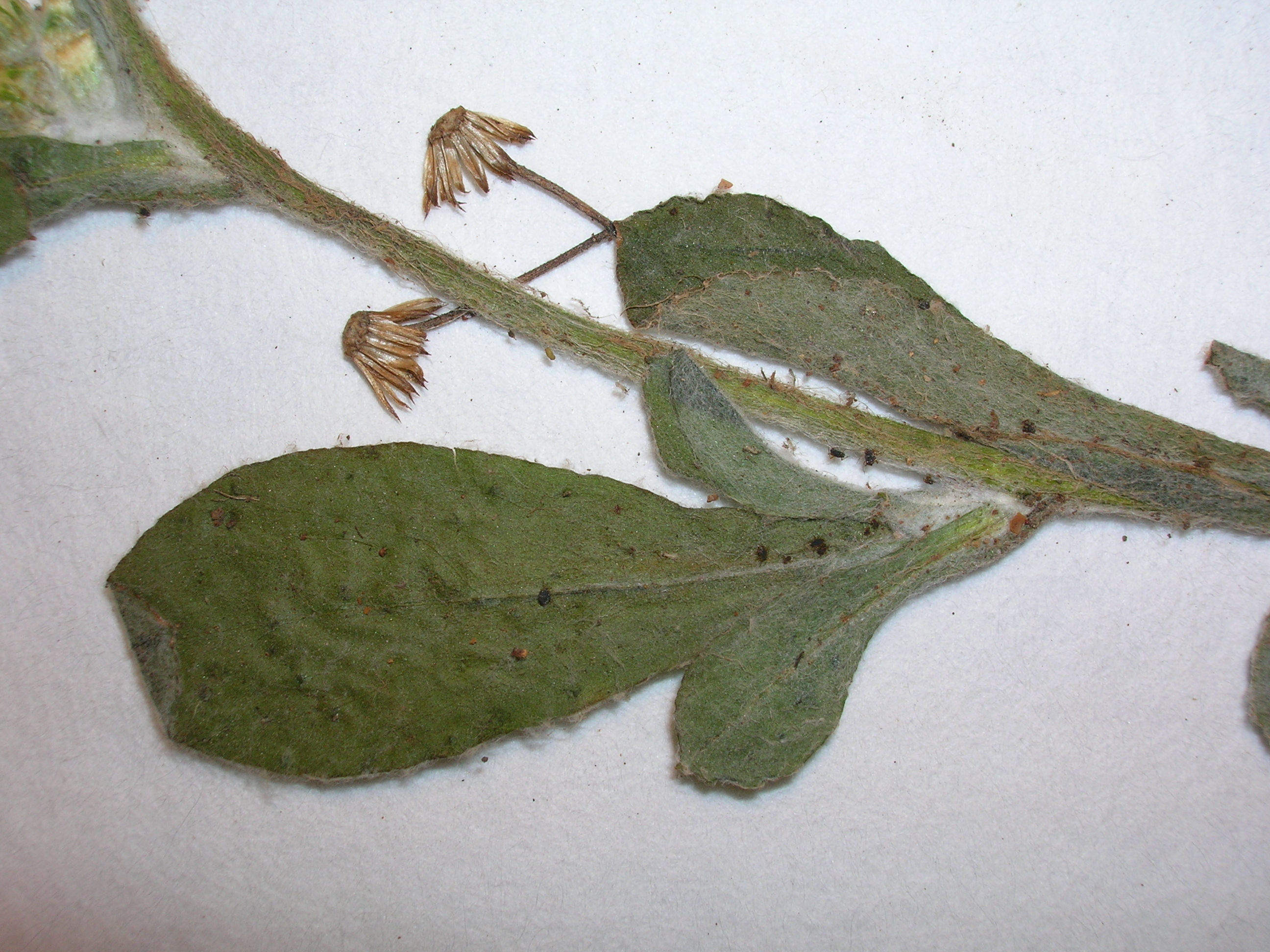

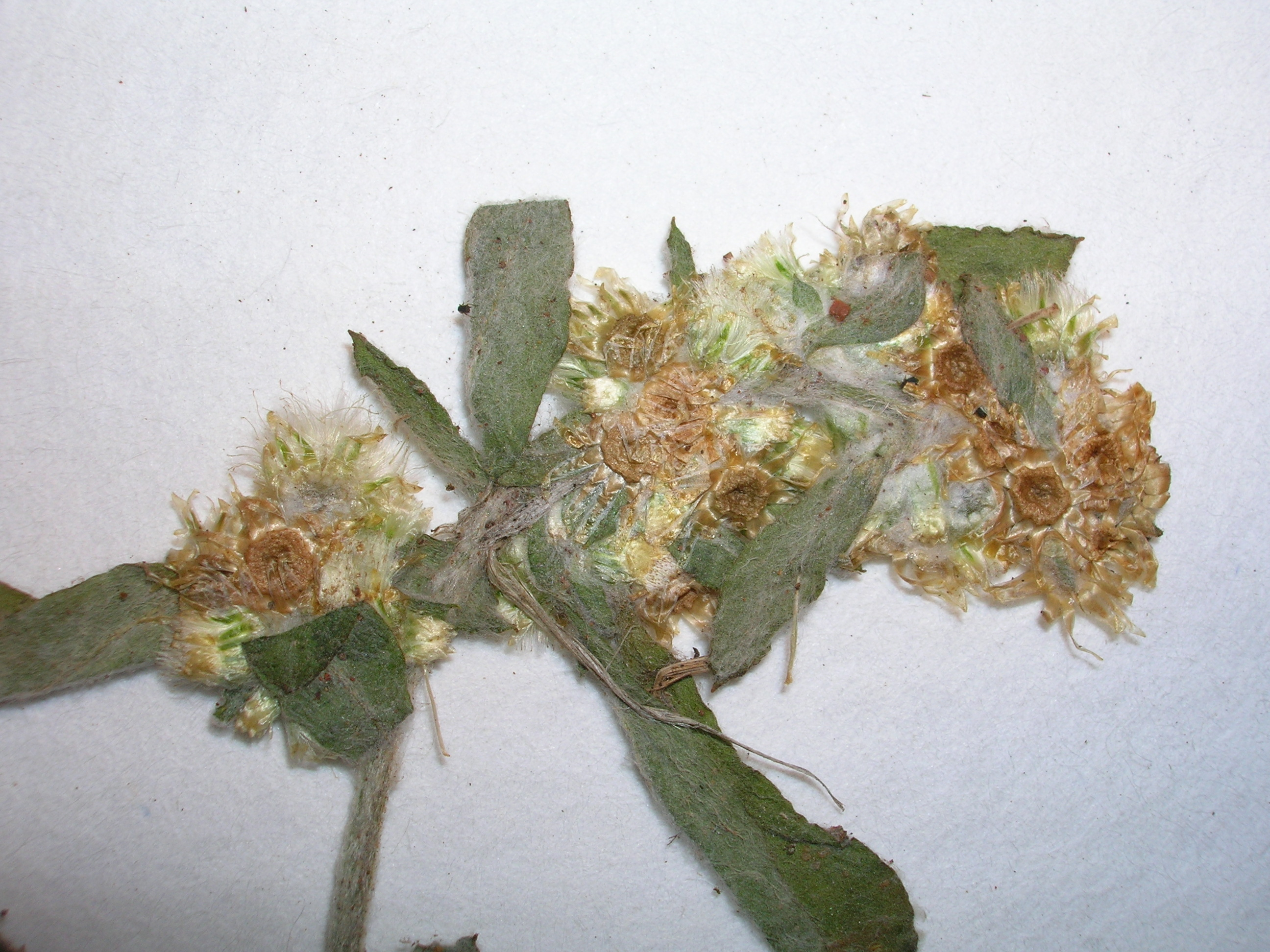

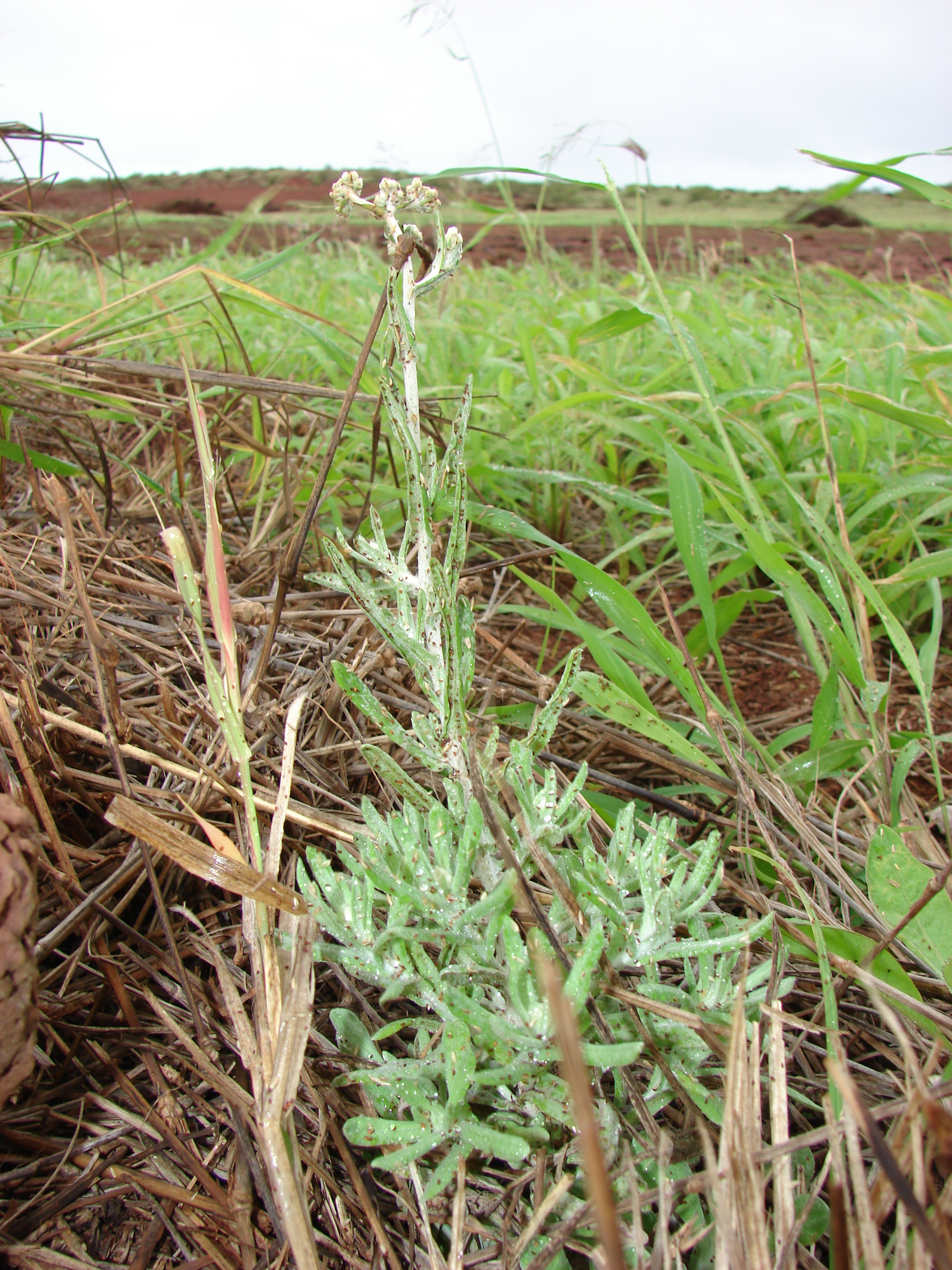
