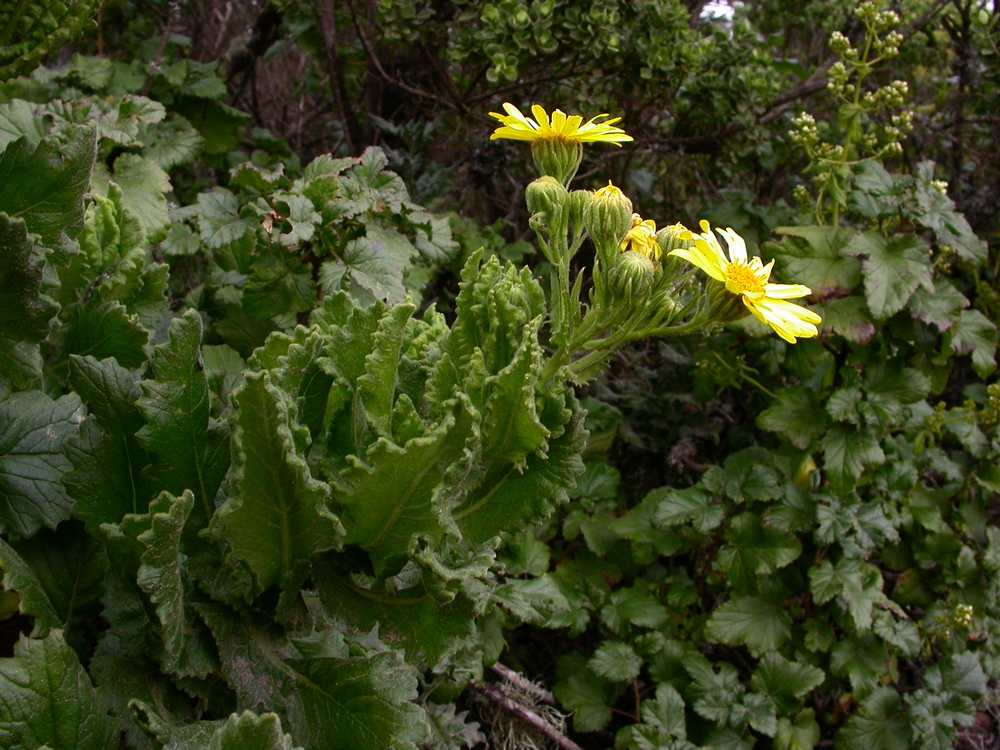

Scientific classification
- Kingdom: Plantae
- Clade: Tracheophytes
- Clade: Angiosperms
- Clade: Eudicots
- Clade: Asterids
- Order: Asterales
- Family: Asteraceae
- Genus: Senecio
- Species: S. planiflorus

Binomial name
- Senecio planiflorus Kunze ex Cabrera

= Senecio planiflorus =

Species of plant

Senecio planiflorus is a species of the genus Senecio and family Asteraceae. It is endemic to Chile.
