= Gamochaeta antarctica =

Conservation status
- Endangered (IUCN 3.1)

Scientific classification
- Kingdom: Plantae
- Clade: Tracheophytes
- Clade: Angiosperms
- Clade: Eudicots
- Clade: Asterids
- Order: Asterales
- Family: Asteraceae
- Genus: Gamochaeta
- Species: G. antarctica

Binomial name
- Gamochaeta antarctica (Hook.f.) Cabrera

Synonyms
- Gnaphalium antarcticum Hook.f. (1847)

Species of flowering plant

Gamochaeta antarctica, the Antarctic cudweed, is a species of flowering plant in the family Asteraceae. It is found only in the Falkland Islands in the South Atlantic Ocean, where its natural habitat is temperate dwarf shrub heath.
