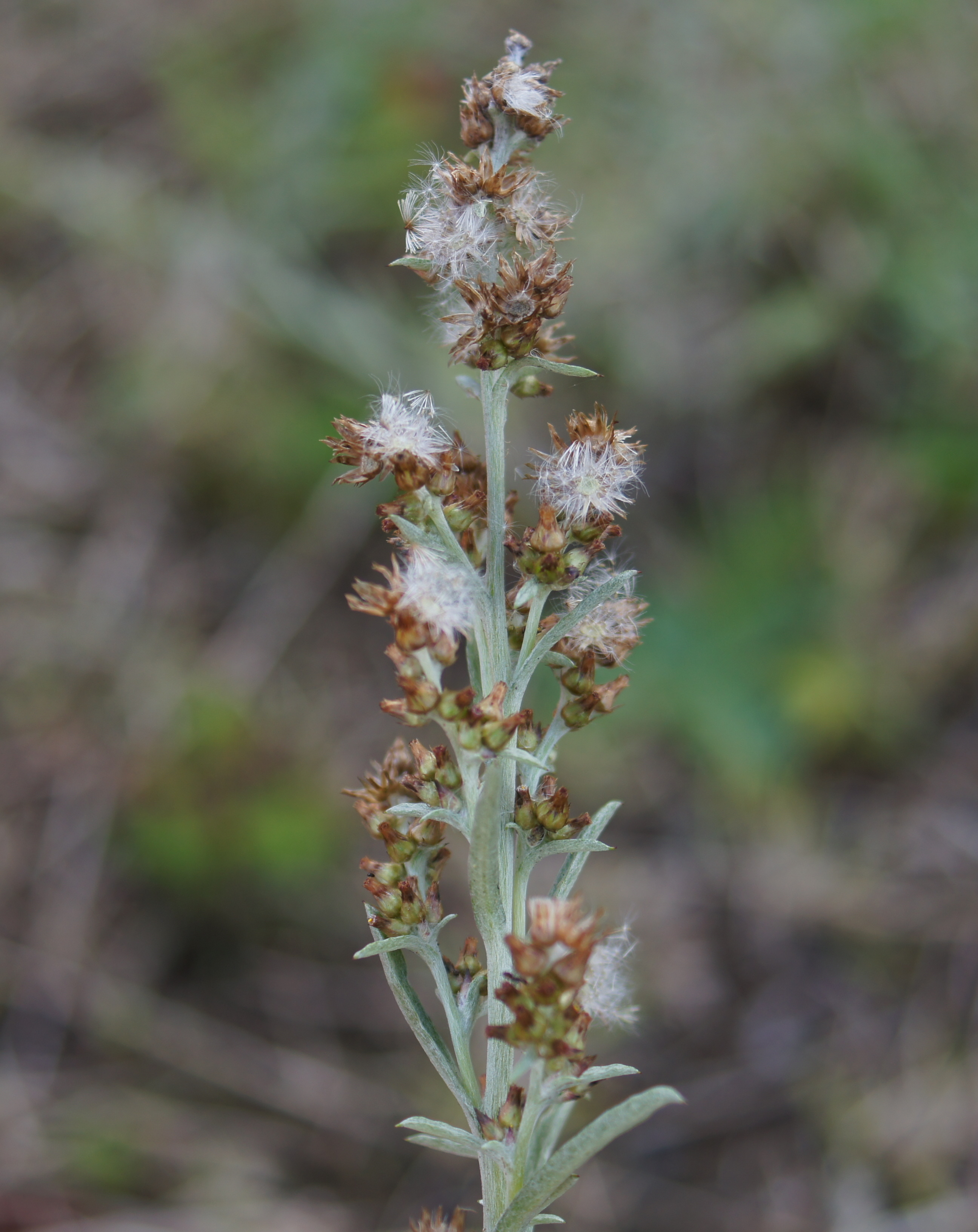

Scientific classification
- Kingdom: Plantae
- Clade: Tracheophytes
- Clade: Angiosperms
- Clade: Eudicots
- Clade: Asterids
- Order: Asterales
- Family: Asteraceae
- Genus: Gamochaeta
- Species: G. calviceps

Binomial name
- Gamochaeta calviceps (Fernald) Cabrera

Synonyms
- Gnaphalium calvescens Fernald; Gnaphalium calviceps Fernald

= Gamochaeta calviceps =

Species of flowering plant

Gamochaeta calviceps, the narrowleaf purple everlasting, is a species of flowering plant in the family Asteraceae. It is native to South America and to the southeastern United States (from Texas and Oklahoma to Virginia (though not Florida). It has also become naturalized in other places (Europe, Taiwan, New Zealand, California, etc.).

Gamochaeta calviceps is an annual herb up to 55 cm (22 in) tall. Leaves are long and narrow, up to 6 cm (2.4 in) long, mostly clustered along the base and often folded along the middle. The plant forms many small flower heads in elongated arrays. Each head contains 2–4 purple disc flowers but no ray flowers. Flowers bloom April to July. It grows in fields, disturbed sites, flower beds, and edges of woods.

Gamochaeta calviceps is similar to G. falcata, and many G. calviceps specimens from the United States have long been misidentified as G. falcata.
