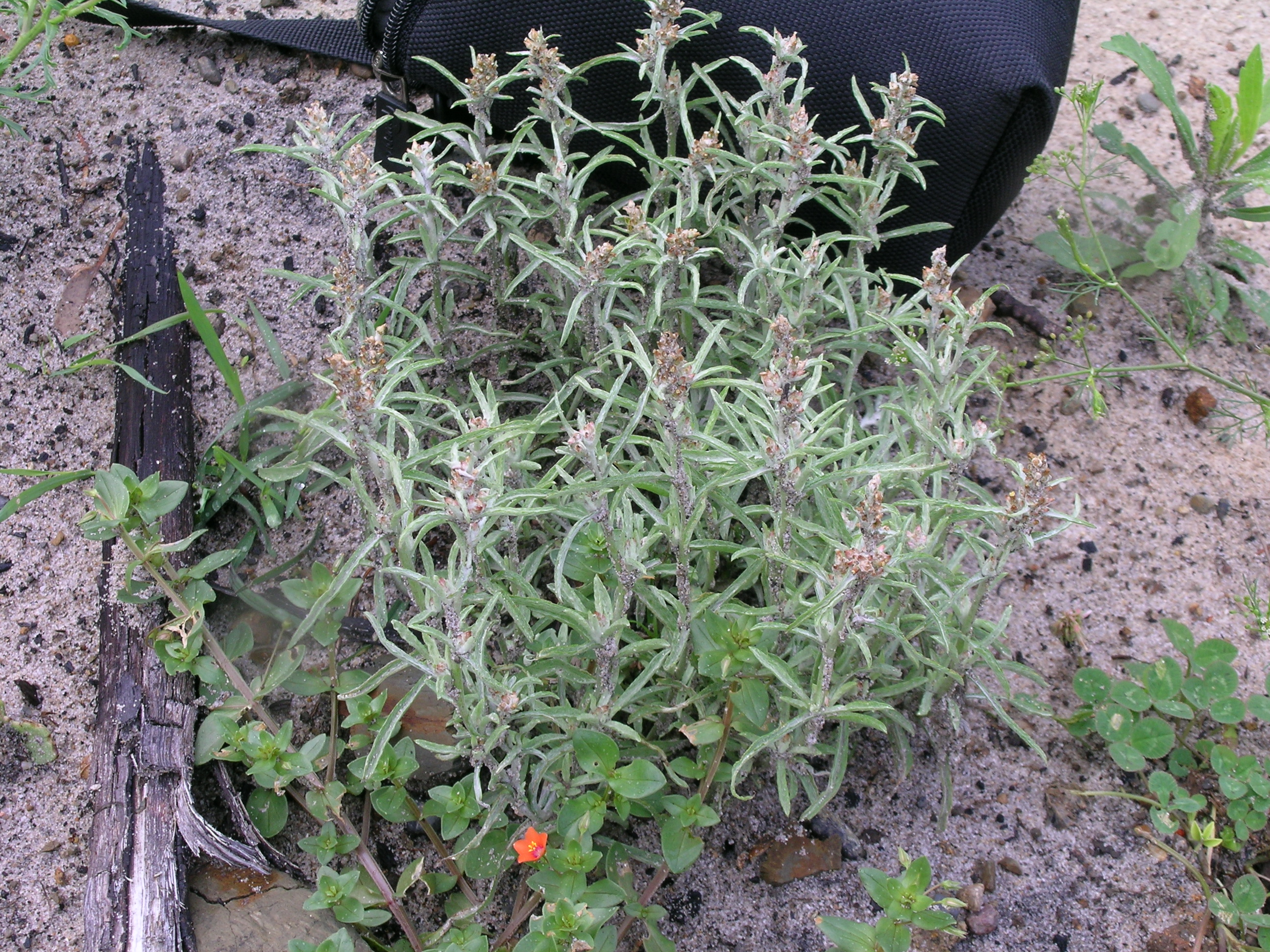

Scientific classification
- Kingdom: Plantae
- Clade: Tracheophytes
- Clade: Angiosperms
- Clade: Eudicots
- Clade: Asterids
- Order: Asterales
- Family: Asteraceae
- Genus: Gamochaeta
- Species: G. antillana

Binomial name
- Gamochaeta antillana (Urb.) Anderb. 1991

Synonyms
- Gamochaeta antillarum (Urb.) Anderb.; Gnaphalium antillanum Urb. 1915

= Gamochaeta antillana =

Species of flowering plant

Gamochaeta antillana, the delicate everlasting, is a species of flowering plant in the family Asteraceae. It is native to the Greater Antilles and to the southeastern United States (from Florida to Louisiana). It has also become naturalized in other places (South America, Europe, Australia, New Zealand, Texas, California, the Carolinas, etc.).

Gamochaeta antillana is an annual herb up to 40 cm (16 in) tall, producing a taproot. Leaves are up to 4 cm (1.6 in) long. The plant forms many small flower heads in elongated arrays and also in tightly packed clumps. Each head contains 3–5 purple disc flowers but no ray flowers.

Gamochaeta antillana is similar to G. falcata, and many Gamochaeta antillana specimens from the eastern United States have long been misidentified as G. falcata.
