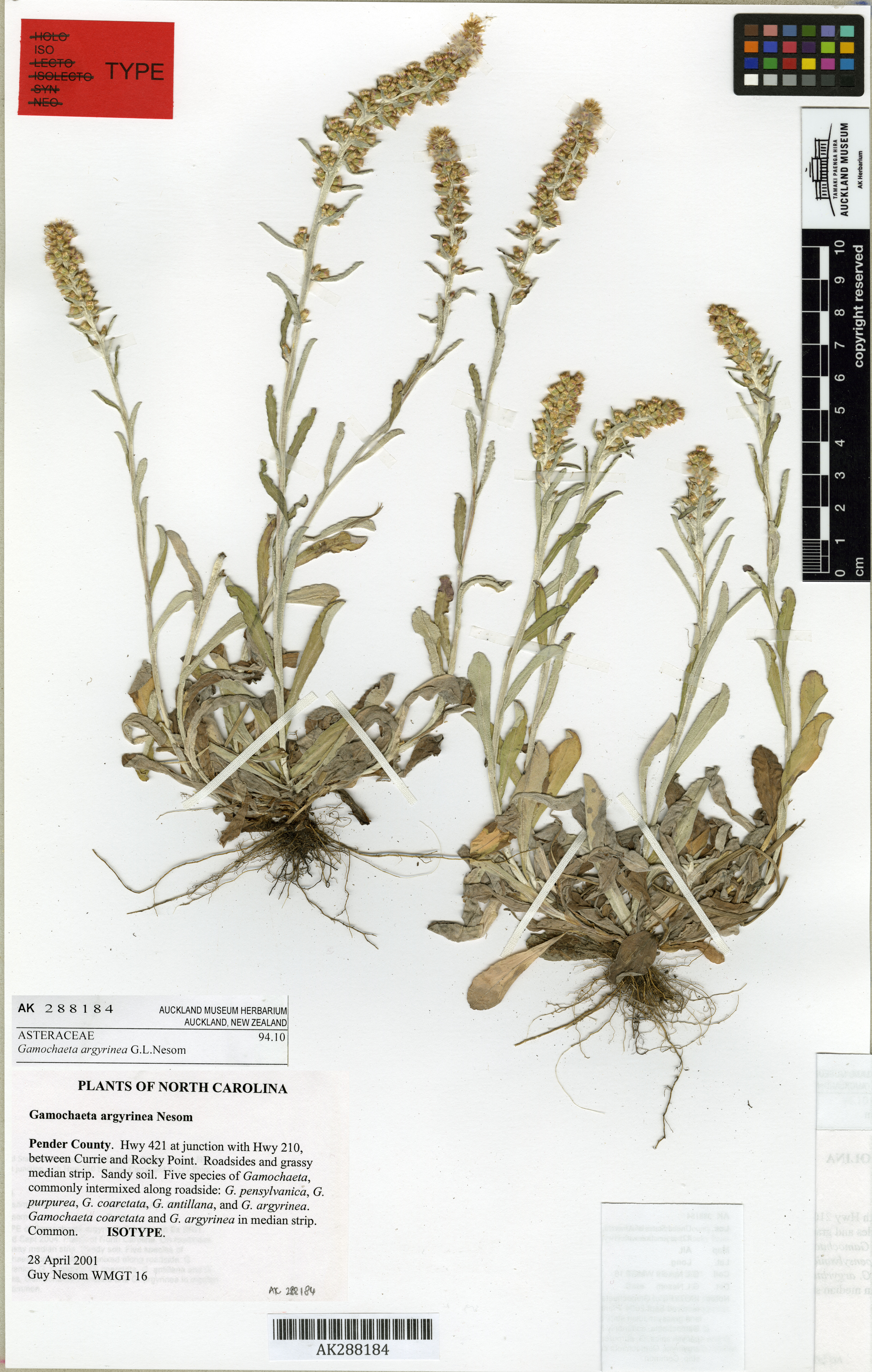
- Gamochaeta argyrinea in a drawing by G.L. Nesom

Scientific classification
- Kingdom: Plantae
- Clade: Tracheophytes
- Clade: Angiosperms
- Clade: Eudicots
- Clade: Asterids
- Order: Asterales
- Family: Asteraceae
- Genus: Gamochaeta
- Species: G. argyrinea

Binomial name
- Gamochaeta argyrinea G.L.Nesom 2004

= Gamochaeta argyrinea =

Species of flowering plant

Gamochaeta argyrinea, the silvery cudweed or silvery everlasting, is a North American species of flowering plant in the family Asteraceae. It is widespread across the southeastern and south-central United States from Delaware south to Florida and west as far as southeastern Kansas and central Texas. It has also been found in Puerto Rico and in northern California (probably introduced).

Gamochaeta argyrinea is an annual herb up to 40 cm (16 in) tall. Leaves are up to 8 cm (3.1 in) long, green on the top but appearing silvery on the underside because of many woolly hairs. The plant forms many small flower heads in elongated arrays. Each head contains 4–6 purple or yellow-brown disc flowers but no ray flowers.
