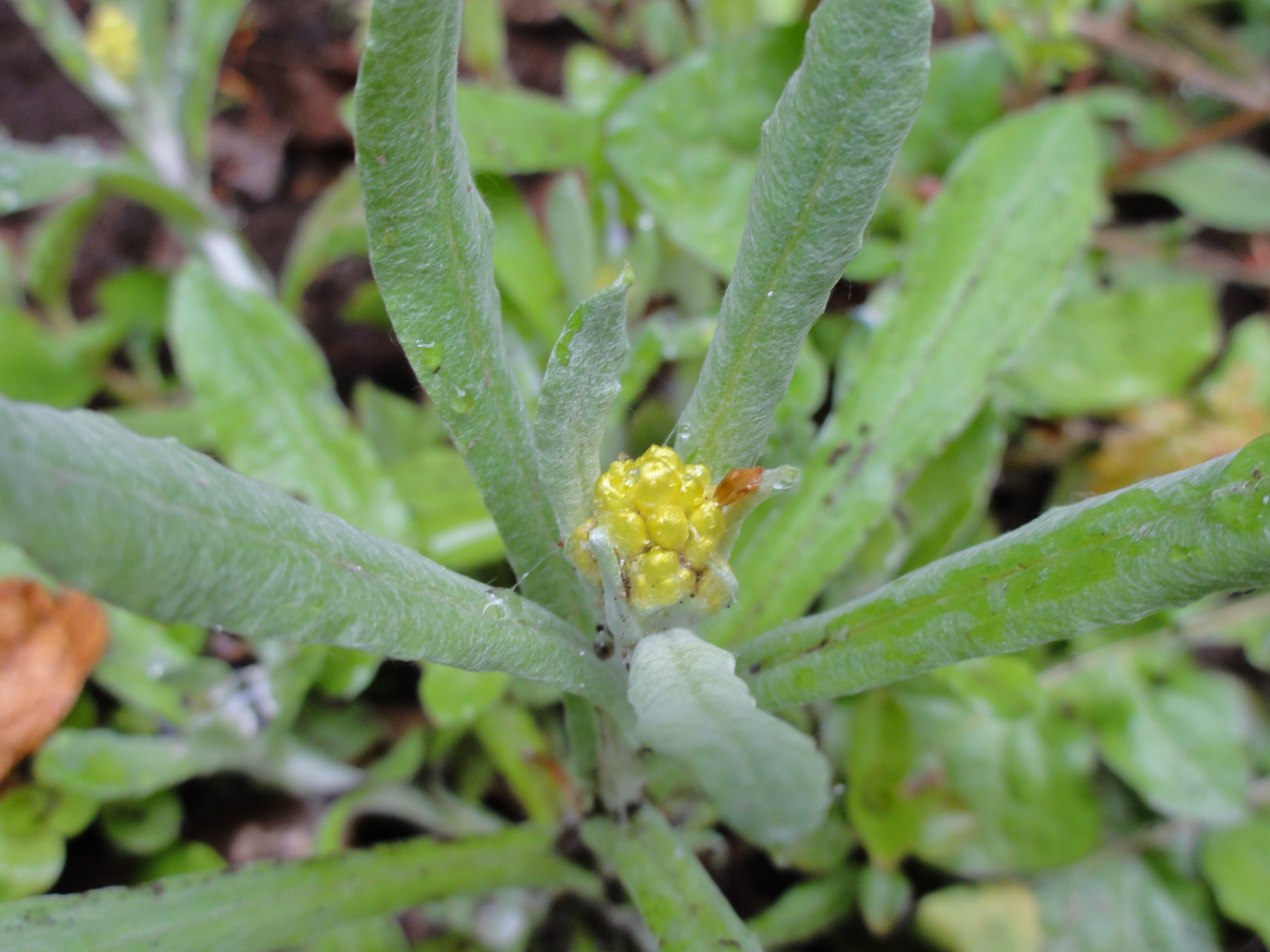
- Gamochaeta calviceps

Scientific classification
- Kingdom: Plantae
- Clade: Tracheophytes
- Clade: Angiosperms
- Clade: Eudicots
- Clade: Asterids
- Order: Asterales
- Family: Asteraceae
- Subfamily: Asteroideae
- Tribe: Gnaphalieae
- Genus: Gamochaeta; Wedd.

Type species
- Gamochaeta americana (Mill.) Wedd.

Synonyms
- Gamochaetopsis Anderb. & S.E.Freire; Gnaphalium sect. Gamochaeta (Wedd.) Benth.; Gnaphalium subg. Gamochaeta (Wedd.) Gren.; Stuckertiella Beauverd

= Gamochaeta =

Genus of flowering plants

Gamochaeta is a genus of flowering plants in the family Asteraceae. There has not always been agreement among botanists regarding its status as a recognized genus, but it has become more accepted in recent years. It currently includes many plants that previously belonged in genus Gnaphalium. Like many species of Gnaphalium, many Gamochaeta are called cudweeds or everlastings.

Gamochaeta are native to North and South America, with one species endemic to Tristan da Cunha in the South Atlantic. Some species are found in other regions as introduced species outside of their native ranges, and sometimes as invasive noxious weeds.

Plants of this genus have "relatively small heads in spiciform (spike-like) arrays, concave post-fruiting receptacles, truncate collecting appendages of style branches in bisexual florets, relatively small cypselae (fruits) with minute, mucilage-producing papilliform hairs on the faces, and pappus bristles basally connate (joined) in smooth rings and released as single units."

Species

- Gamochaeta aliena – Chile
- Gamochaeta alpina – south Argentina, Chile
- Gamochaeta ambatensis – Catamarca
- Gamochaeta americana – lechuguilla, palomita, American everlasting – South America, Mesoamerica, West Indies
- Gamochaeta andina – Chile
- Gamochaeta antarctica – Antarctic cudweed – Tierra del Fuego, Falkland Islands
- Gamochaeta antillana – southeastern US
- Gamochaeta argentina – Rio Grande do Sul, Uruguay, northeastern Argentina
- Gamochaeta argyrinea – silvery cudweed – California, southeastern United States
- Gamochaeta axillaris – Chile
- Gamochaeta badillana – Venezuela
- Gamochaeta beckii – Bolivia
- Gamochaeta berteroana – Chile
- Gamochaeta boliviensis – Bolivia
- Gamochaeta calviceps – southeastern US
- Gamochaeta camaquaensis – Rio Grande do Sul
- Gamochaeta chamissonis – Chile, Argentina, Juan Fernández Islands
- Gamochaeta chilensis – Chile
- Gamochaeta chionesthes – white-cloaked cudweed – southeastern United States
- Gamochaeta coarctata – South America
- Gamochaeta depilata – Neuquén, Chile
- Gamochaeta deserticola – Tarapaca, Salta, Jujuy
- Gamochaeta diffusa – Neuquén, Chile
- Gamochaeta erecta – Rio Grande do Sul
- Gamochaeta girardiana – Rio Grande do Sul
- Gamochaeta grazielae – Rio de Janeiro
- Gamochaeta hiemalis – Southern Brazil
- Gamochaeta humilis – Antofagasta, Peru, Bolivia
- Gamochaeta irazuensis – Costa Rica
- Gamochaeta longipedicellata – Jujuy
- Gamochaeta lulioana – Peru, Bolivia
- Gamochaeta malvinensis – Tierra del Fuego, Falkland Islands
- Gamochaeta meridensis – Venezuela
- Gamochaeta monticola – Neuquén, Chile, Bolivia
- Gamochaeta neuquensis – Neuquén, Rio Negro, central + southern Chile
- Gamochaeta nigrevestis – southeastern Brazil
- Gamochaeta nivalis – Chile, Argentina
- Gamochaeta oligantha – Santiago, Valparaíso
- Gamochaeta oreophila – Peru
- Gamochaeta pensylvanica – Mesoamerica
- Gamochaeta platensis – Uruguay, northeastern Argentina, southern Brazil
- Gamochaeta polybotrya – Chile, Argentina
- Gamochaeta procumbens – central Chile
- Gamochaeta purpurea – North America
- Gamochaeta rizzinii – Rio de Janeiro, Rio Grande do Sul
- Gamochaeta rosacea – Durango, San Luis Potosi
- Gamochaeta serpyllifolia – Chile, Argentina
- Gamochaeta simplicicaulis – simple-stem cudweed – South America; naturalized in New Zealand + southeastern United States
- Gamochaeta sphacelata – South America, Mexico, Texas
- Gamochaeta spiciformis – Chile, Argentina
- Gamochaeta stachydifolia – Brazil, Argentina, Chile, Uruguay, Juan Fernández Islands
- Gamochaeta stagnalis – desert cudweed – Mexico, Guatemala, United States (California Arizona New Mexico)
- Gamochaeta suffruticosa – Coquimbo
- Gamochaeta thouarsii – Tristan da Cunha
- Gamochaeta ustulata – Pacific Coast of US + Canada
- Gamochaeta valparadisea – Valparaíso
- Gamochaeta villarroelii – Santiago
