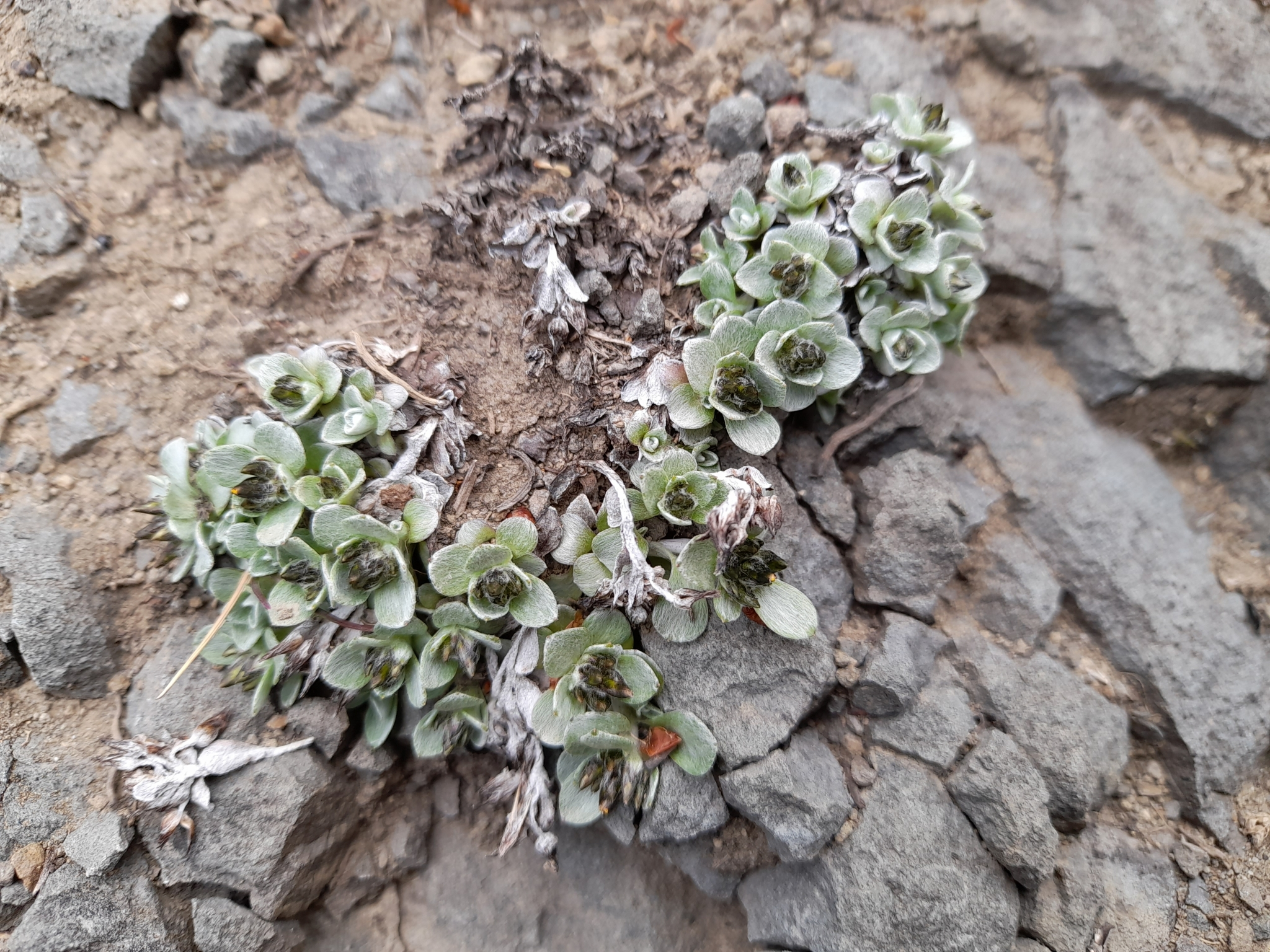
- Gamochaeta alpina in Magallanes Region, Chile

Scientific classification
- Kingdom: Plantae
- Clade: Tracheophytes
- Clade: Angiosperms
- Clade: Eudicots
- Clade: Asterids
- Order: Asterales
- Family: Asteraceae
- Genus: Gamochaeta
- Species: G. alpina

Binomial name
- Gamochaeta alpina (Poepp. & Endl.) S.E.Freire & Anderb.

Synonyms
- Gamochaetopsis alpina (Poepp. & Endl.) Anderb. & S.E.Freire; Laennecia alpina Poepp.; Lucilia alpina Cabrera

= Gamochaeta alpina =

Species of plant

Gamochaeta alpina is a species of flowering plant in the family Asteraceae, native to south Argentina, and central and south Chile. It was first described in 1845 as Laennecia alpina.
