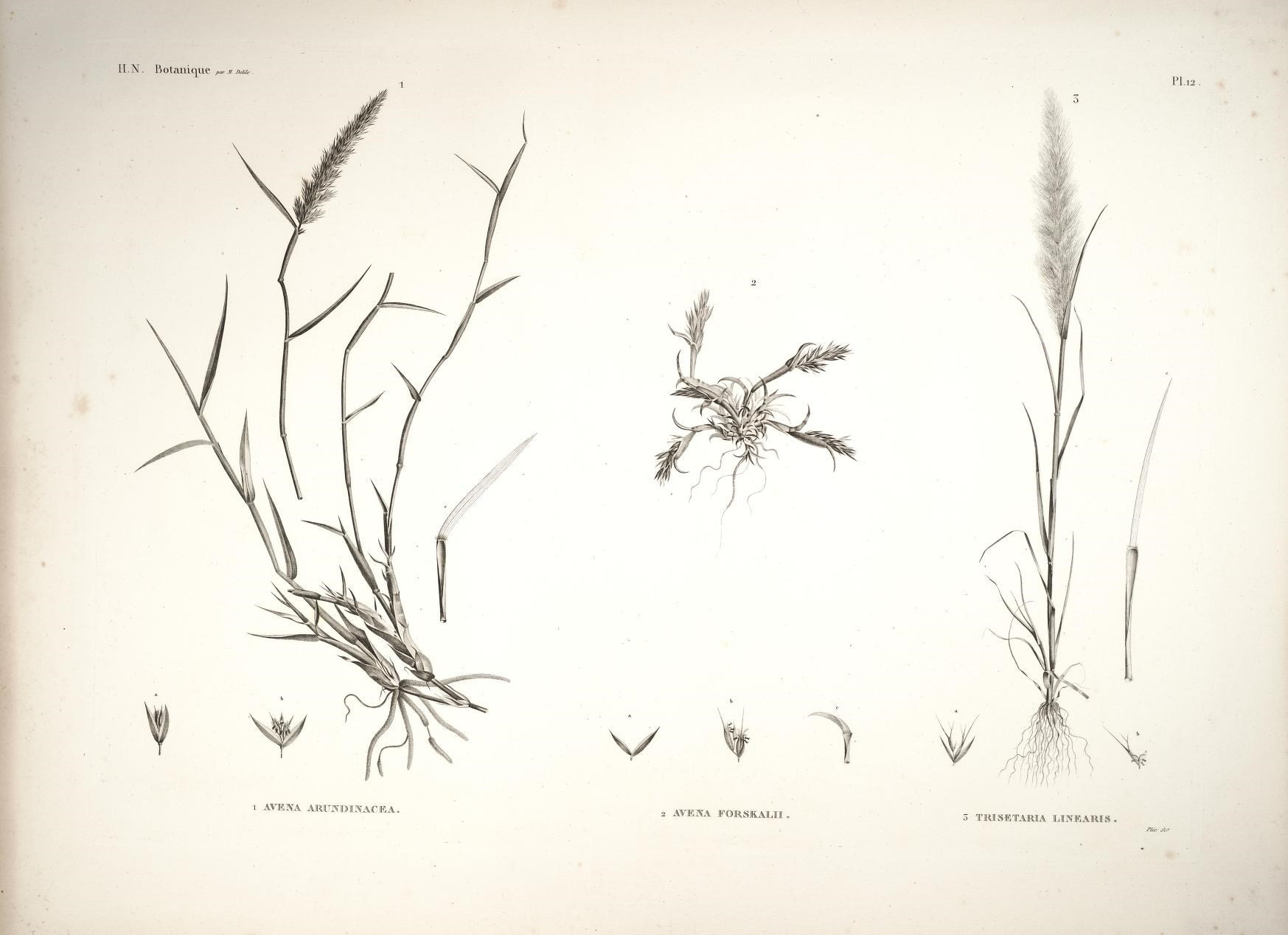
- Trisetaria linearis (right plant)

Scientific classification
- Kingdom: Plantae
- Clade: Tracheophytes
- Clade: Angiosperms
- Clade: Monocots
- Clade: Commelinids
- Order: Poales
- Family: Poaceae
- Subfamily: Pooideae
- Supertribe: Poodae
- Tribe: Poeae
- Subtribe: Aveninae
- Genus: Trisetaria; Forssk.

Type species
- Trisetaria linearis Forssk.

Synonyms
- Haeupleria G.H.Loos; Sennenia Pau ex Sennen; Trichaeta P.Beauv.

= Trisetaria =

Genus of grasses

Trisetaria is a genus of plants in the grass family, native to Asia and to the Mediterranean region.

Species

- Trisetaria aurea - European Mediterranean
- Trisetaria chaudharyana - Saudi Arabia
- Trisetaria dufourei - Spain, Portugal
- Trisetaria glumacea - Libya, Egypt, Israel, Palestine, Lebanon, Syria
- Trisetaria koelerioides - Palestine, Israel, Lebanon, Syria, Sinai
- Trisetaria linearis - Middle East from Egypt to Iran
- Trisetaria loeflingiana - from Canary Islands to Kazakhstan
- Trisetaria macrochaeta - Spain, Libya, Egypt, Israel
- Trisetaria myriantha - Italy, Greece, Albania, Yugoslavia
- Trisetaria nitida - Algeria
- Trisetaria ovata - Spain, Portugal
- Trisetaria panicea - Mediterranean
- Trisetaria parviflora - Italy, Algeria, Tunisia
- Trisetaria scabriuscula - Spain, Portugal
- Trisetaria vaccariana - Libya

formerly included

- Trisetaria airoides - Trisetum spicatum
- Trisetaria alpestris - Trisetum alpestre
- Trisetaria antoniijosephii - Trisetum glaciale
- Trisetaria argentea - Trisetum argenteum
- Trisetaria baregensis - Trisetum baregense
- Trisetaria bornmuelleri - Avenula pubescens
- Trisetaria brevifolia - Trisetum distichophyllum
- Trisetaria burnoufii - Trisetum splendens
- Trisetaria carpatica - Avenula pubescens
- Trisetaria conradiae - Trisetum gracile
- Trisetaria cristata - Rostraria cristata
- Trisetaria deyeuxioides - Peyritschia deyeuxioides
- Trisetaria distichophylla - Trisetum distichophyllum
- Trisetaria elongata - Sphenopholis interrupta
- Trisetaria flavescens - Trisetum flavescens
- Trisetaria fusca - Trisetum ciliare
- Trisetaria fuscescens - Rostraria pumila
- Trisetaria glacialis - Trisetum glaciale
- Trisetaria hispida - Trisetum hispidum
- Trisetaria laconica - Trisetum laconicum
- Trisetaria michelii - Avellinia festucoides
- Trisetaria phleoides - Rostraria cristata
- Trisetaria pubescens - Rostraria litorea
- Trisetaria pumila - Rostraria pumila
- Trisetaria quinqueseta - Agrostis quinqueseta
- Trisetaria rigida - Trisetum rigidum
- Trisetaria sesquitertia - Avenula pubescens
- Trisetaria sibirica - Trisetum sibiricum
- Trisetaria spicata - Trisetum spicatum
- Trisetaria subalpestris - Trisetum subalpestre
- Trisetaria tenuiformis - Trisetum tenuiforme
- Trisetaria tenuis - Ventenata dubia
- Trisetaria thospitica - Trisetum thospiticum
- Trisetaria tolucensis - Trisetum spicatum
- Trisetaria turcica - Trisetum turcicum
- Trisetaria velutina - Trisetum velutinum
- Trisetaria villosa - Trisetum bertolonii
