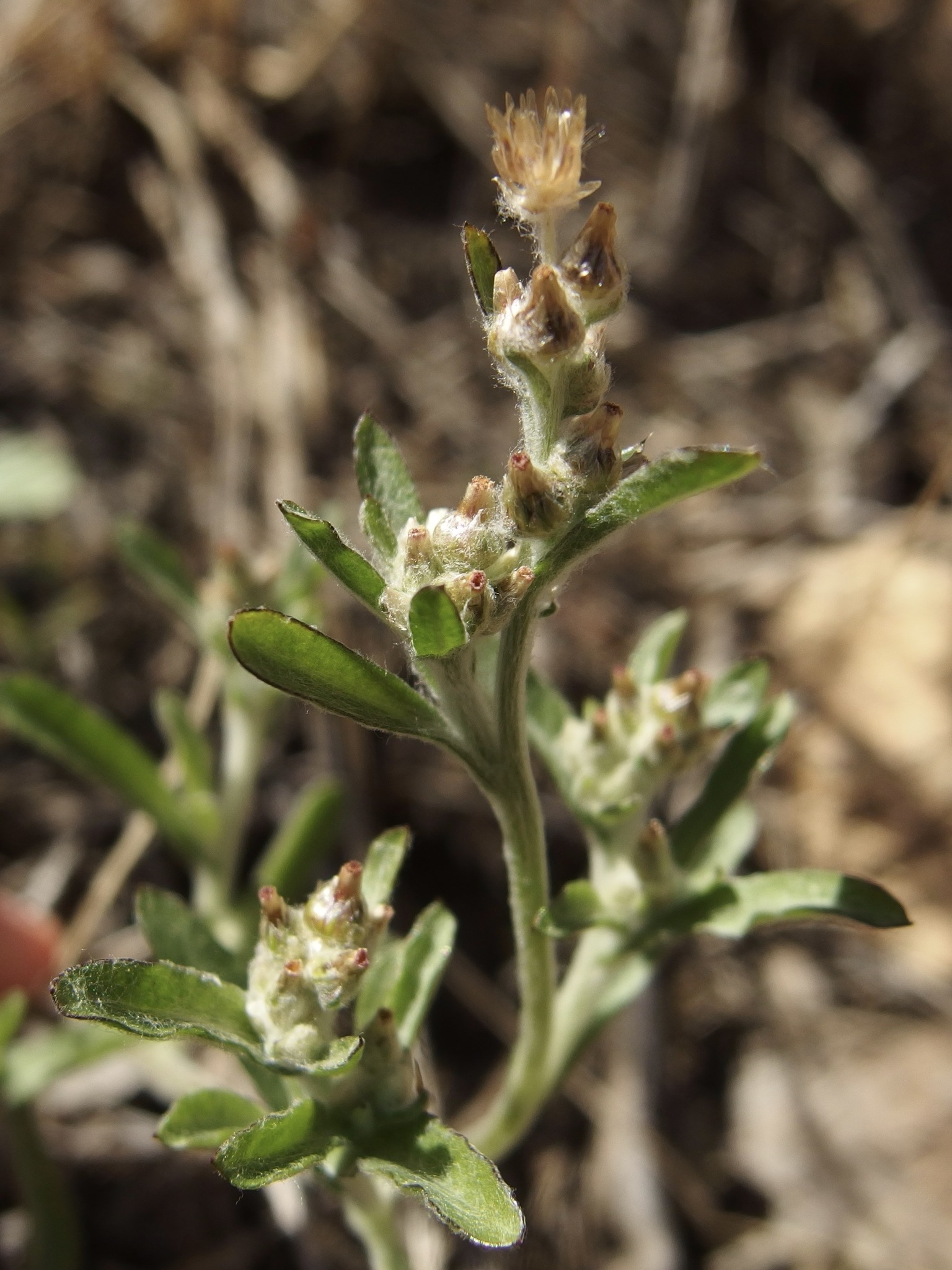

Scientific classification
- Kingdom: Plantae
- Clade: Tracheophytes
- Clade: Angiosperms
- Clade: Eudicots
- Clade: Asterids
- Order: Asterales
- Family: Asteraceae
- Genus: Gamochaeta
- Species: G. sphacelata

Binomial name
- Gamochaeta sphacelata (Kunth) Cabrera 1961

Synonyms
- Gnaphalium sphacelatum Kunth; Gnaphalium sphacilatum Kunth; Gnaphalium purpureum var. sphacelatum (Kunth) Speg.

= Gamochaeta sphacelata =

Species of flowering plant

Gamochaeta sphacelata, the owl's crown, is a species of flowering plant in the family Asteraceae. It is widespread across South America, Central America, and Mexico with the distribution just barely crossing the Río Grande into western Texas.

Gamochaeta sphacelata is an annual herb up to 50 cm (20 in) tall. Leaves are long and narrow, up to 4 cm (1.6 in) long. The plant forms many small flower heads in elongated arrays. Each head contains 3–5 purple disc flowers but no ray flowers.
