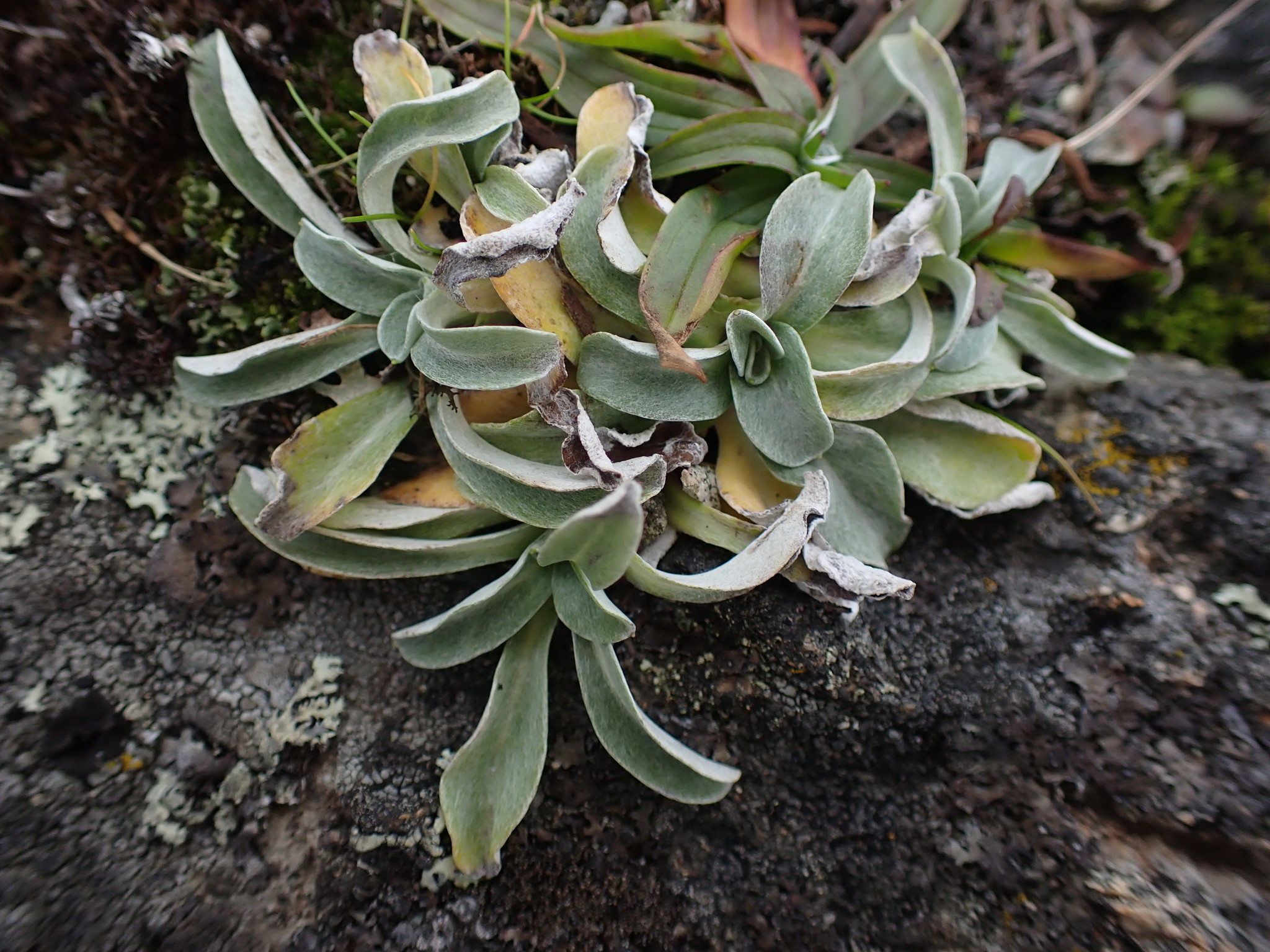

Scientific classification
- Kingdom: Plantae
- Clade: Tracheophytes
- Clade: Angiosperms
- Clade: Eudicots
- Clade: Asterids
- Order: Asterales
- Family: Asteraceae
- Genus: Gamochaeta
- Species: G. ustulata

Binomial name
- Gamochaeta ustulata (Nutt.) Holub 1976 not (Nutt.) G.L. Nesom 1990

Synonyms
- Gnaphalium ustulatum Nutt. 1841; Gamochaeta ustulata (Nutt.) G.L. Nesom; Gnaphalium purpureum var. ustulatum (Nutt.) B.Boivin

= Gamochaeta ustulata =

Species of flowering plant

Gamochaeta ustulata, commonly named featherweed or Pacific cudweed, is a North American species of flowering plant in the family Asteraceae. It is native to the western United States and southwestern Canada, in British Columbia, Washington, Oregon, and California. It is found primarily on seaside hills and in the Coast Ranges, with additional populations inland.

Gamochaeta ustulata is an annual or perennial herb up to 40 cm (16 in) tall. Leaves are up to 5 cm (2.0 in) long, green on the top but appearing white on the underside because of many woolly hairs. The plant forms many small flower heads in elongated arrays. Each head contains 4–6 yellow disc flowers but no ray flowers.
