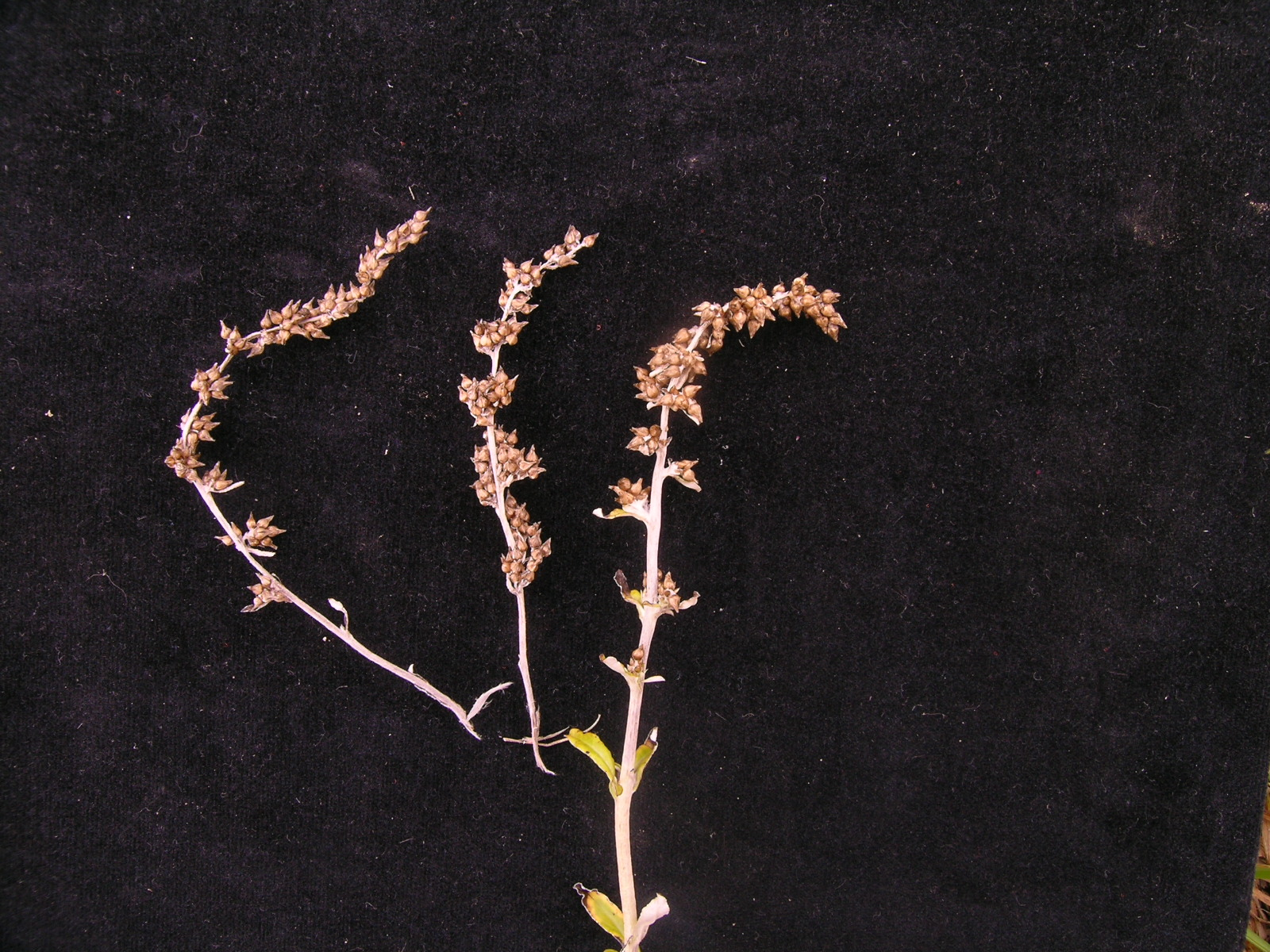
- Flowerhead

Scientific classification
- Kingdom: Plantae
- Clade: Tracheophytes
- Clade: Angiosperms
- Clade: Eudicots
- Clade: Asterids
- Order: Asterales
- Family: Asteraceae
- Genus: Gamochaeta
- Species: G. americana

Binomial name
- Gamochaeta americana (Mill.) Wedd.

Synonyms
- List: Gnaphalium americanum Mill.; Gnaphalium purpureum var. americanum (Mill.) Klatt; Gamochaeta coarctata (Willd.) Kerguélen; Gamochaeta guatemalensis (Gand.) Cabrera; Gamochaeta irazuensis G.L.Nesom; Gamochaeta spicata (Klatt) Cabrera; Gnaphalium coarctatum Willd.; Gnaphalium consanguineum Gaudich.; Gnaphalium guatemalense Gand.; Gnaphalium liui S.S.Ying; Gnaphalium purpureum var. macrophyllum Greenm.; Gnaphalium purpureum var. spicatum Klatt; Gnaphalium radians var. spicatum Klatt; Gnaphalium spicatum Lam.

= Gamochaeta americana =

Species of plant

Gamochaeta americana, also known as American everlasting, is a plant in the family Asteraceae.
