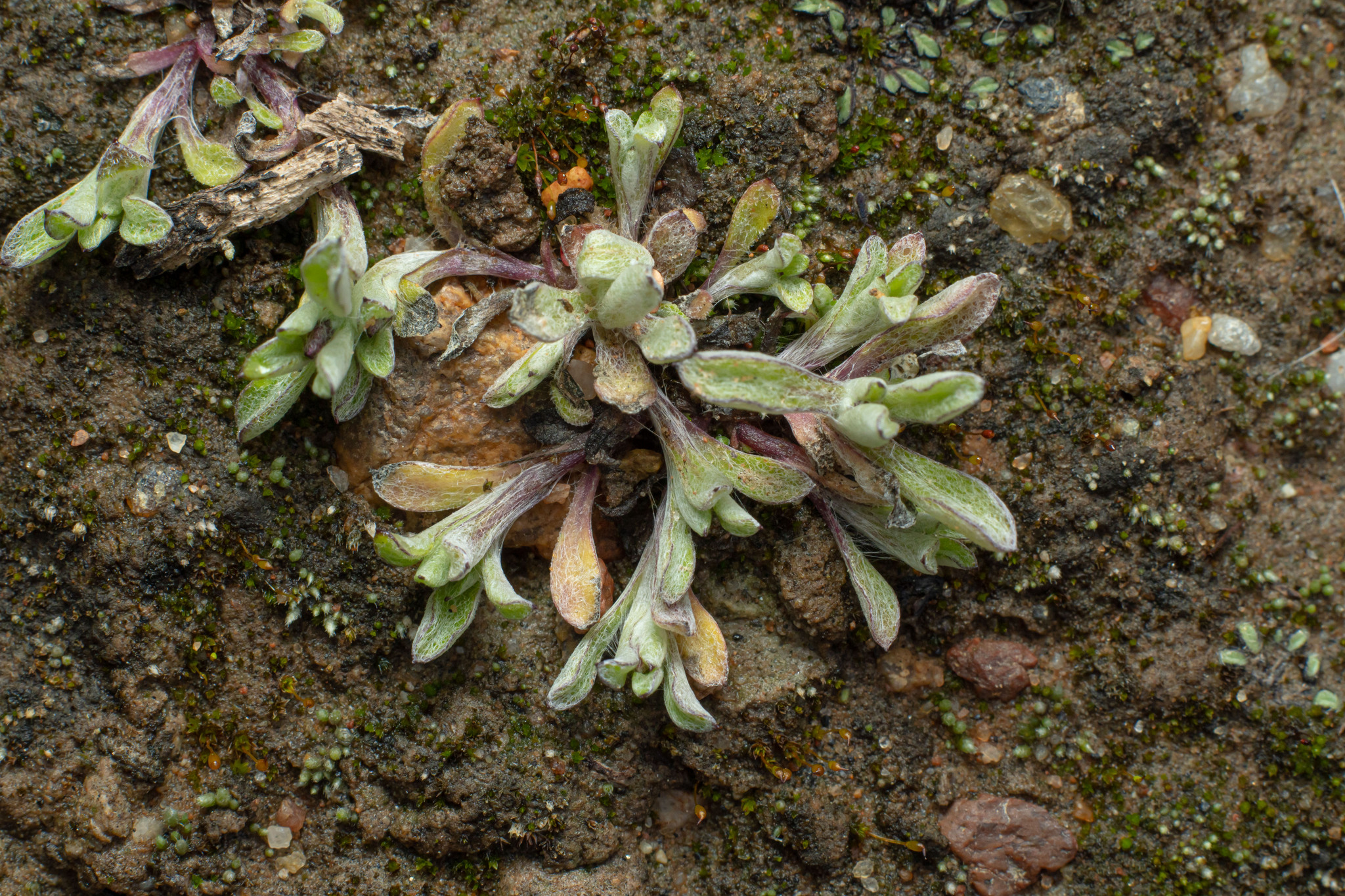

Scientific classification
- Kingdom: Plantae
- Clade: Tracheophytes
- Clade: Angiosperms
- Clade: Eudicots
- Clade: Asterids
- Order: Asterales
- Family: Asteraceae
- Genus: Gamochaeta
- Species: G. stagnalis

Binomial name
- Gamochaeta stagnalis (I.M.Johnst.) Anderb. 1991

Synonyms
- Synonymy: Gnaphalium stagnale I.M. Johnst. 1923; Gamochaeta stagnale Anderb.; Gamochaeta falcata (Lam.) Cabrera; Gnaphalium falcatum Lam.; Gnaphalium heteroides Klatt; Gnaphalium purpureum var. falcatum (Lam.) Torr. & A.Gray; Gnaphalium stachydifolium var. falcatum (Lam.) Klatt

= Gamochaeta stagnalis =

Species of flowering plant

Gamochaeta stagnalis, the desert cudweed, is a species of flowering plant in the family Asteraceae. It is native to Mexico, Guatemala, and the southwestern United States (California, Arizona, New Mexico).

Gamochaeta stagnalis is an annual herb up to 35 cm (14 in) tall, producing a slender taproot. Leaves are up to 3 cm (1.2 in) long. The plant forms many small flower heads in tightly packed clumps. Each head contains 3–4 purple disc flowers but no ray flowers.

Gamochaeta stagnalis is very similar to G. purpureum and some G. stagnalis specimens (especially from Arizona) have been misidentified as that species.
