= Michel Kerguélen =

French botanist

Michel François-Jacques Kerguélen (1928–1999) was a French botanist. He was the author or co-author of over 250 plant taxa.
