= Ángel Lulio Cabrera =

Argentine botanist and phytogeographer (1908-1999)

- Born: 19 October 1908; Madrid, Spain
- Died: 8 July 1999 (aged 90); Buenos Aires, Argentina
- Father: Ángel Cabrera
- Relatives: Juan Bautista Cabrera (uncle)
- Scientific career
- Fields: Botany
- Author abbrev. (botany): Cabrera

Ángel Lulio Cabrera (born 19 October 1908 in Madrid, Spain – died 8 July 1999 in Buenos Aires, Argentina) was an Argentine botanist.

== Biography ==
Born in Madrid, Cabrera was the son of zoologist and paleontologist Ángel Cabrera and nephew of the first Anglican bishop in Spain, Juan Bautista Cabrera. His vocation in biology was influenced by family vacations in the Sierra de Guadarrama, as well as his father's profession.

== See also ==
- Taxa named by Ángel Lulio Cabrera
