= Groundsel =

Groundsel is a common name for several plants and may refer to:

- Members of the genus Senecio
  - Creeping groundsel, Senecio angulatus
  - Common groundsel, Senecio vulgaris
  - Welsh groundsel, Senecio cambrensis
  - York radiate groundsel, Senecio eboracensis
  - Eastern groundsel, Senecio vernalis
  - Heath groundsel, Senecio sylvaticus
  - Sticky groundsel, Senecio viscosus
- Groundsel bush, Baccharis halimifolia
- Orange-flowered groundsel, Pseudogynoxys chenopodioides
- Members of Dendrosenecio, the giant groundsels
- Members of Packera, a segregate of Senecio
  - Golden groundsel, Packera aurea (Senecio aureus)
  - Golden groundsel, Packera obovata (Senecio obovatus)
- Members of Roldana, a segregate of Senecio
- Members of Tephroseris
