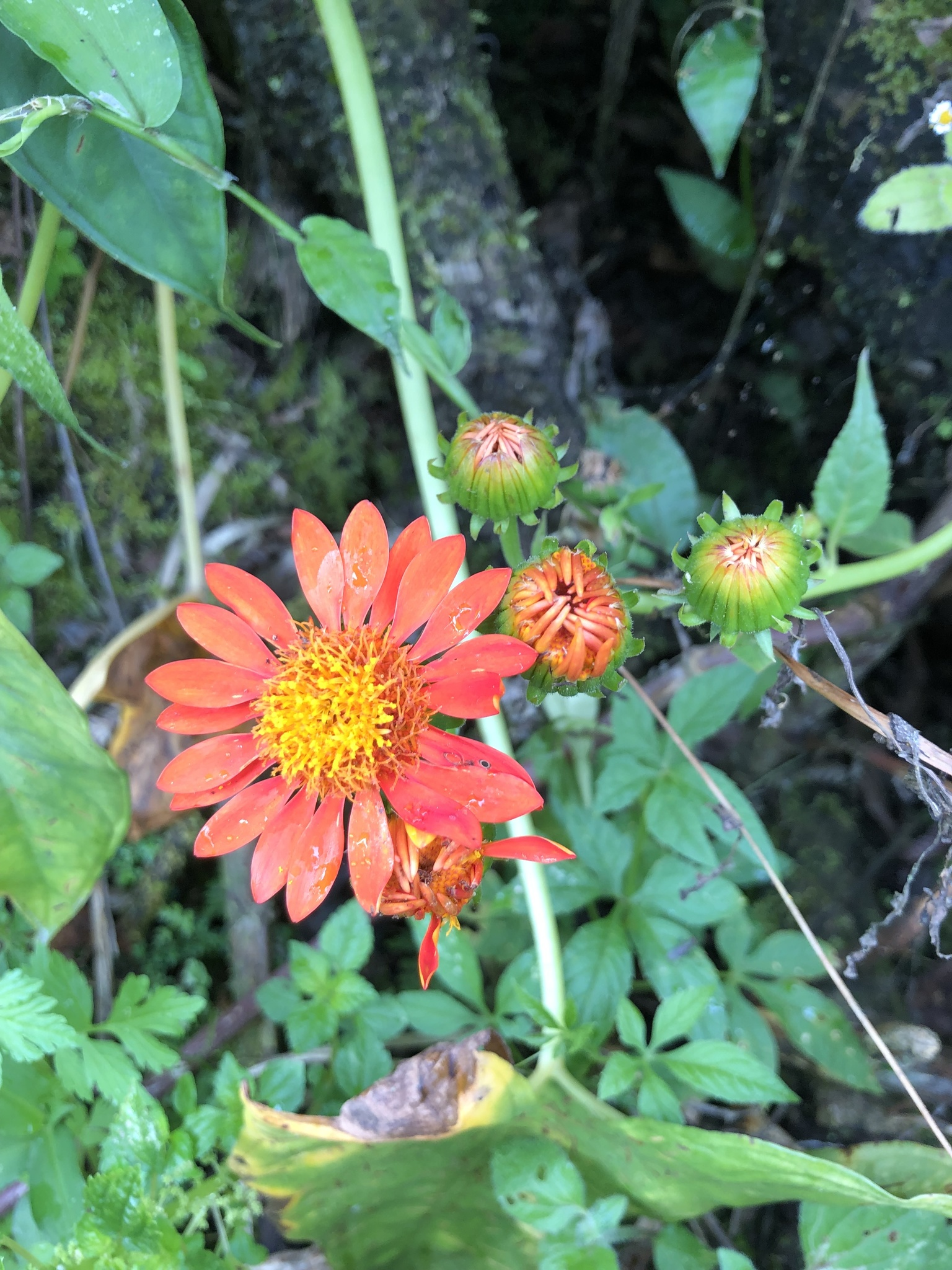

Scientific classification
- Kingdom: Plantae
- Clade: Tracheophytes
- Clade: Angiosperms
- Clade: Eudicots
- Clade: Asterids
- Order: Asterales
- Family: Asteraceae
- Genus: Pseudogynoxys
- Species: P. cummingii

Binomial name
- Pseudogynoxys cummingii (Benth.) H.Rob. & Cuatrec.

Synonyms
- Gynoxys cumingii Benth. Pseudogynoxys benthamii Cabrera; Senecio calocephalus Hemsl. Pseudogynoxys hoffmannii (Klatt) Cuatrec. Senecio hoffmannii Klatt

= Pseudogynoxys cummingii =

Species of plant

Pseudogynoxys cummingii is a species of the genus Pseudogynoxys and family Asteraceae. It is one of three species of Pseudogynoxys that are known in cultivation.
