= Pseudogynoxys chiribogensis =

Conservation status
- Data Deficient (IUCN 3.1)

Scientific classification
- Kingdom: Plantae
- Clade: Tracheophytes
- Clade: Angiosperms
- Clade: Eudicots
- Clade: Asterids
- Order: Asterales
- Family: Asteraceae
- Genus: Pseudogynoxys
- Species: P. chiribogensis

Binomial name
- Pseudogynoxys chiribogensis K.Afzel.

Species of plant

Pseudogynoxys chiribogensis is a species of flowering plant in the family Asteraceae. It is found only in Ecuador. Its natural habitat is subtropical or tropical moist montane forests. It is threatened by habitat loss.
