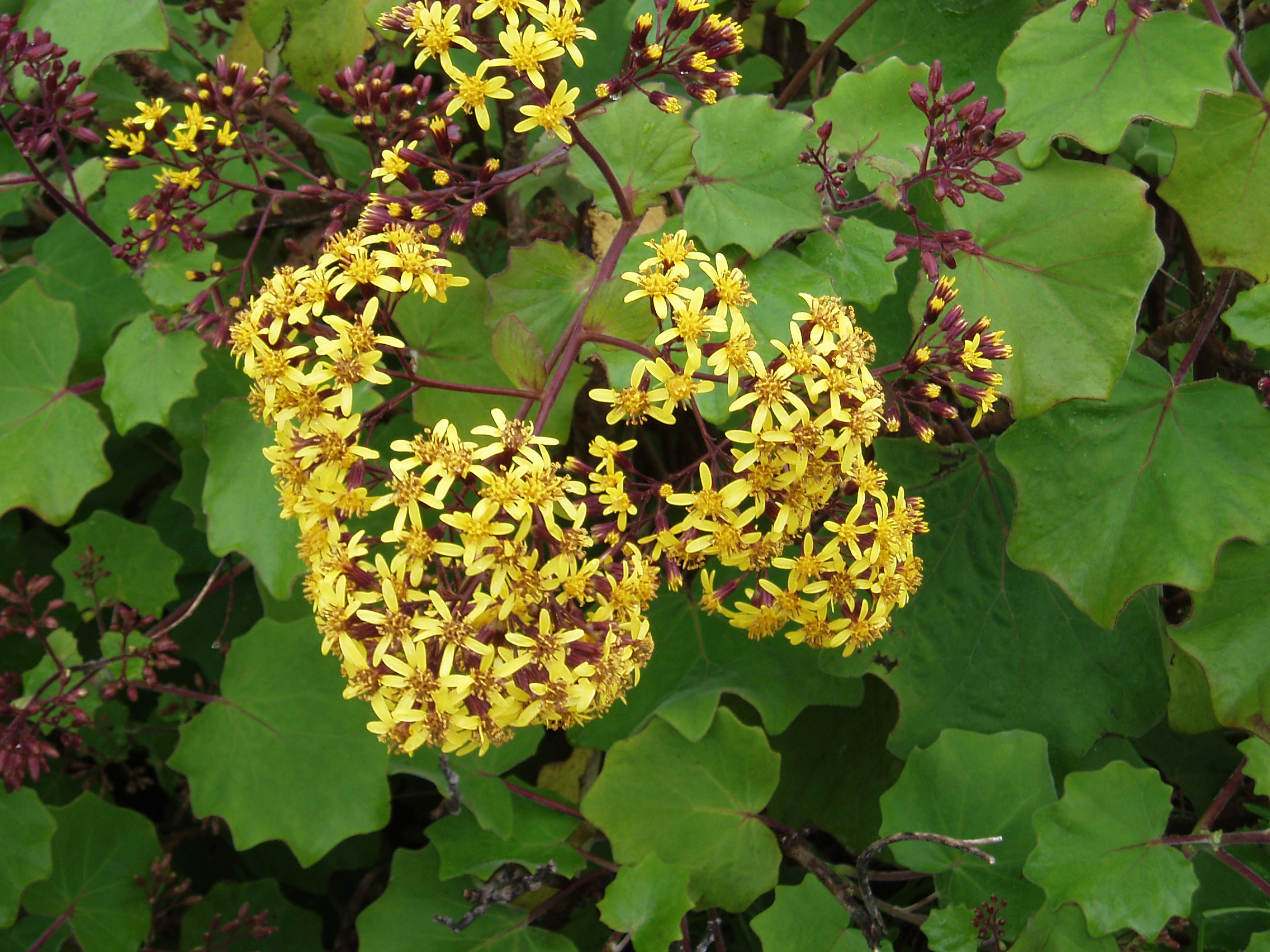

Scientific classification
- Kingdom: Plantae
- Clade: Tracheophytes
- Clade: Angiosperms
- Clade: Eudicots
- Clade: Asterids
- Order: Asterales
- Family: Asteraceae
- Genus: Roldana
- Species: R. petasitis

Binomial name
- Roldana petasitis (Sims) H.Rob. & Brettell

Synonyms
- Senecio petasitis (Sims) DC. Cineraria petasitis Sims

= Roldana petasitis =

Species of plant

Roldana petasitis, also known as the velvet groundsel or Californian geranium, is a species of the genus Roldana and family Asteraceae that used to be classified in the genus Senecio. It is native to Central America.

== Description ==
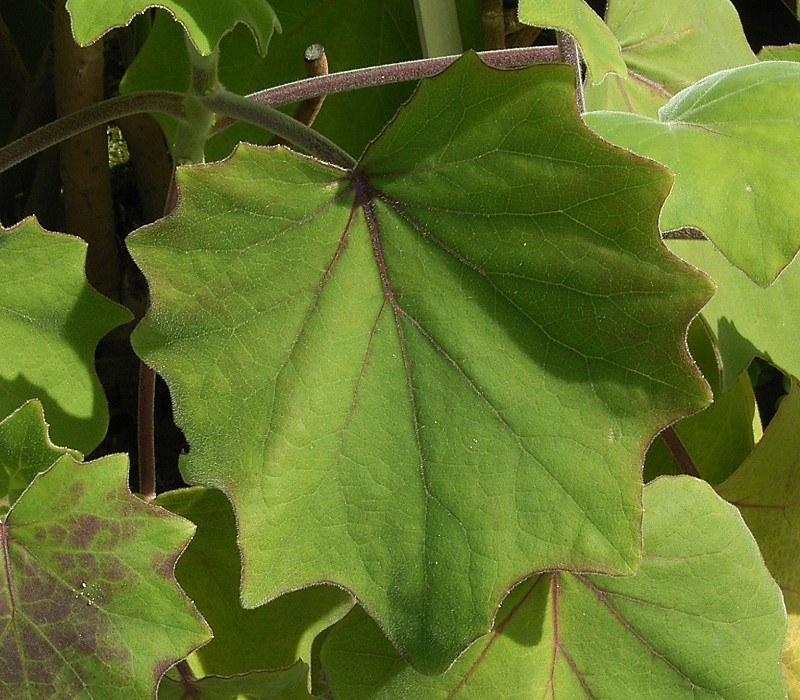
Leaf detail

It is an evergreen subshrub that thrives in constant heat and prefers sheltered gardens. Growing up to 1.8 m tall, it features weak stems, large softly hairy, venated, palmate leaves that are 20 cm long and wide at most, with seven or more broad, blunt lobes.

=== Inflorescences ===
The 8 to 10 mm long, yellow flowerheads, like daisies, of about 6 ray ligulate petals are borne in foliaceous panicles. The plant blooms from winter to early spring.

== Varieties ==
'Roldana p. var. cristobalensis' is a variety of this plant which features leaves with purple undersides. 'Roldana petasitis var. oaxacana' and 'sartorii' are other varieties.

== Distribution ==
The plant is native to the subtropical highlands (Sierra Madre del Sur) of Oaxaca in Mexico, south to the tropics in El Salvador, Guatemala and Nicaragua.

Climatically, it is found in the tropical savanna climates grading into the drier semi-arid or temperate wet/dry areas, where it is present from Veracruz in the north to Nicaragua in the south, in both pine-oak and mountain cloud forests between 1,000m and 2,500m. The 'cristobalensis' variety is found in Chiapas, the southernmost Mexican state, and in Guatemala between elevations 1,000m and 1,600m. It is naturalized in parts of southeastern Australia and New Zealand.

Neotropic

Mexico Southwest: Colima, Guerrero, Jalisco, Michoacán, Nayarit, Oaxaca
Mesoamerica: El Salvador, Guatemala, Honduras, Nicaragua

== Gallery ==
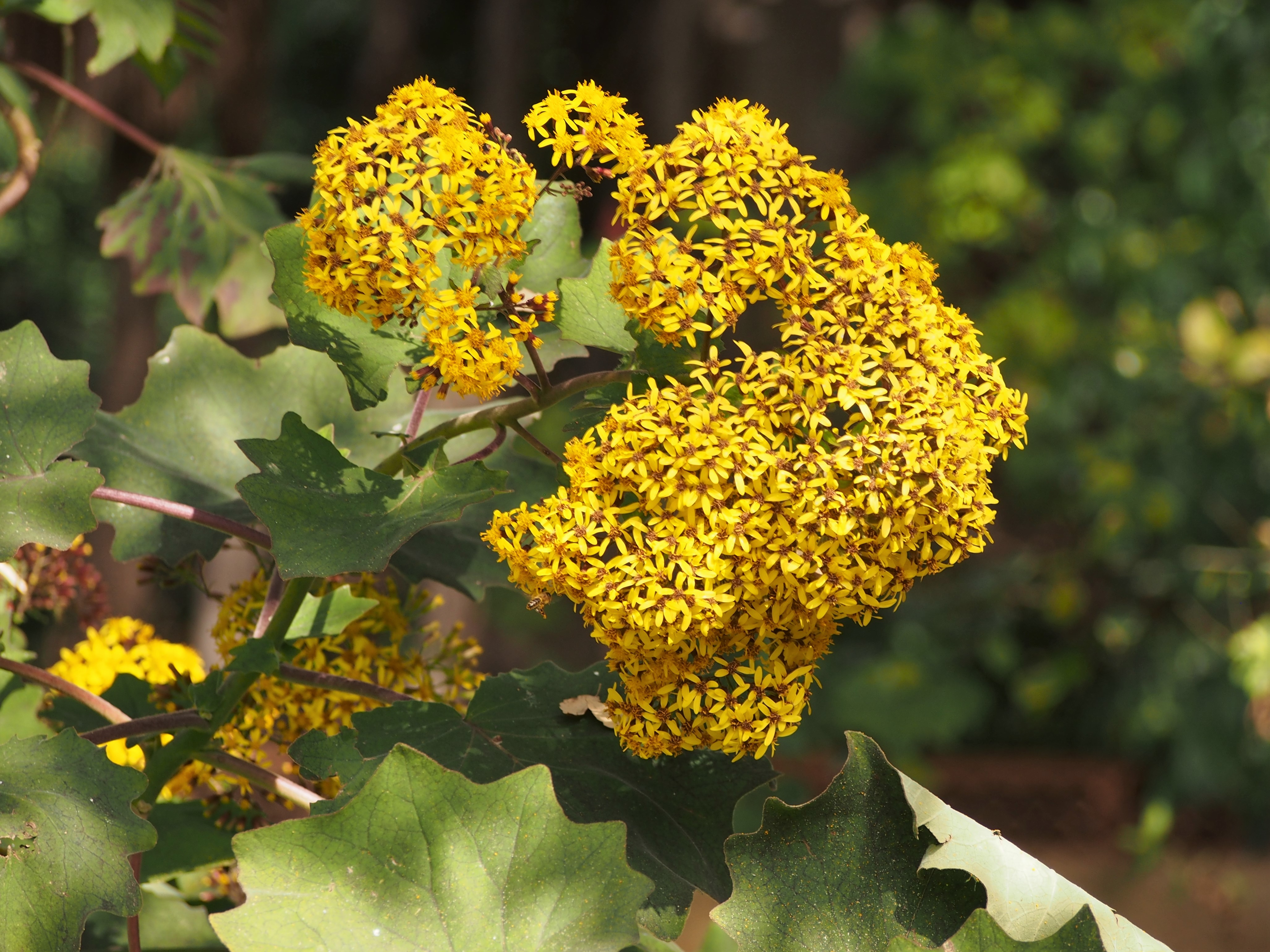
Bunch of flowers

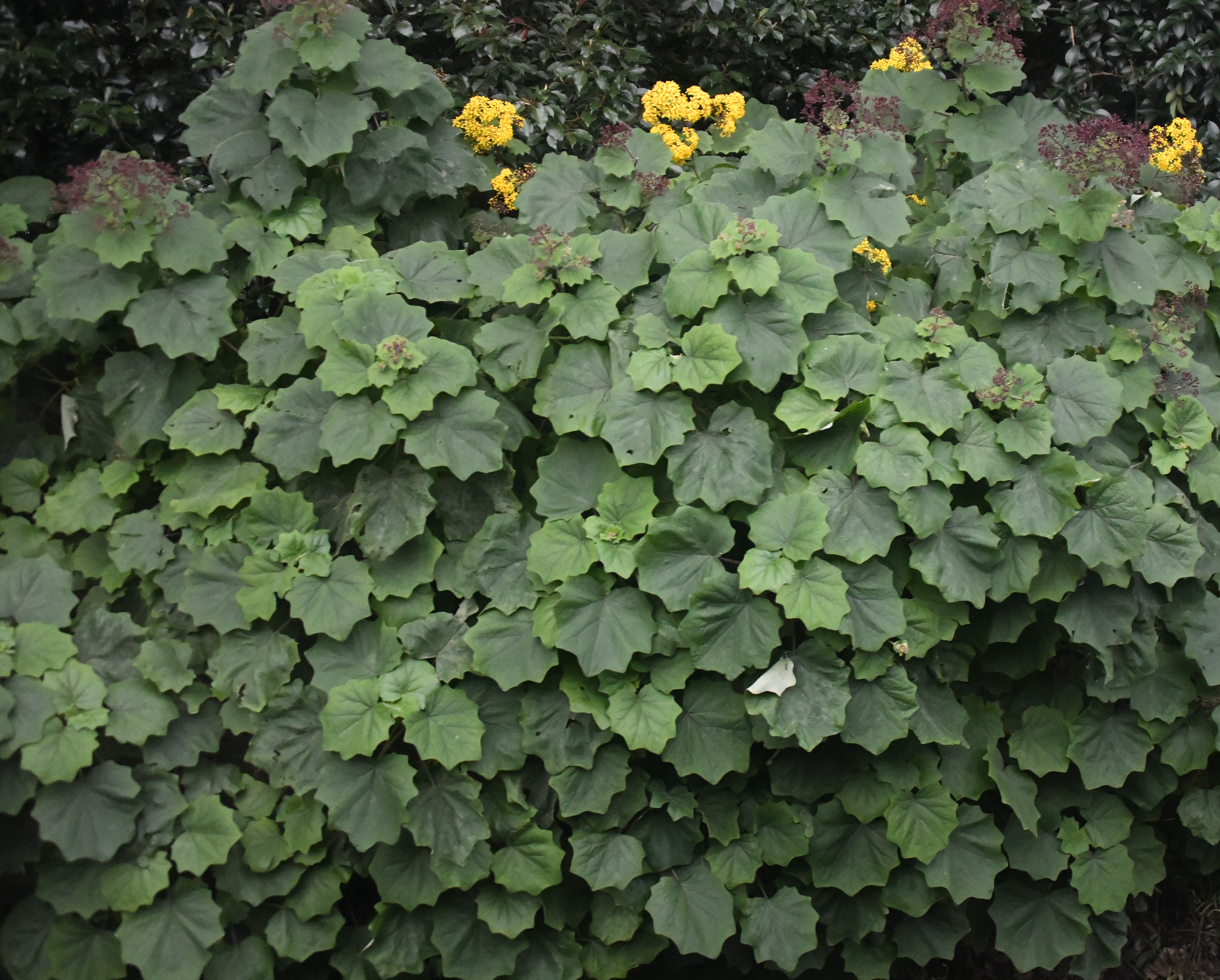
Bushy habit

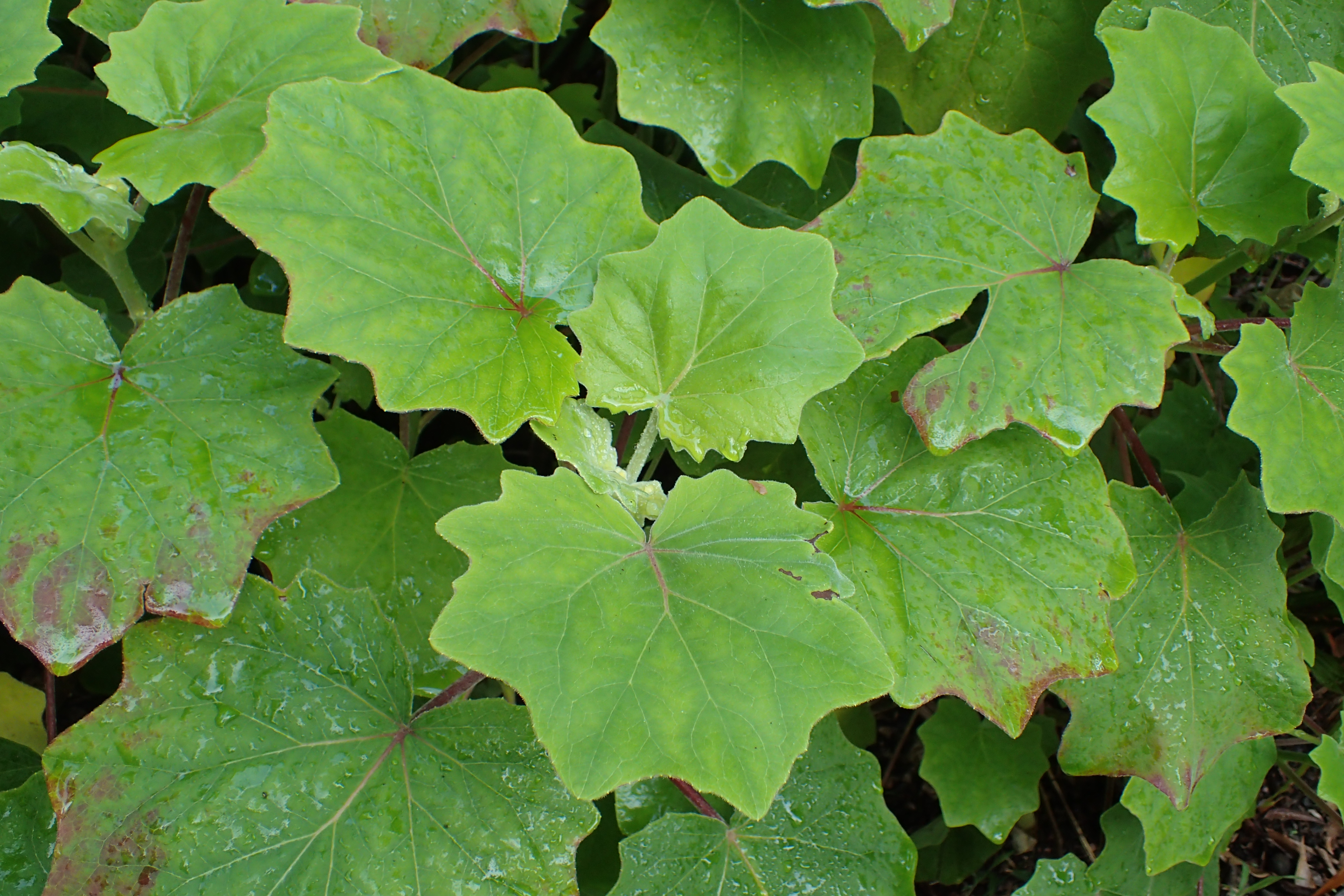
Leaves

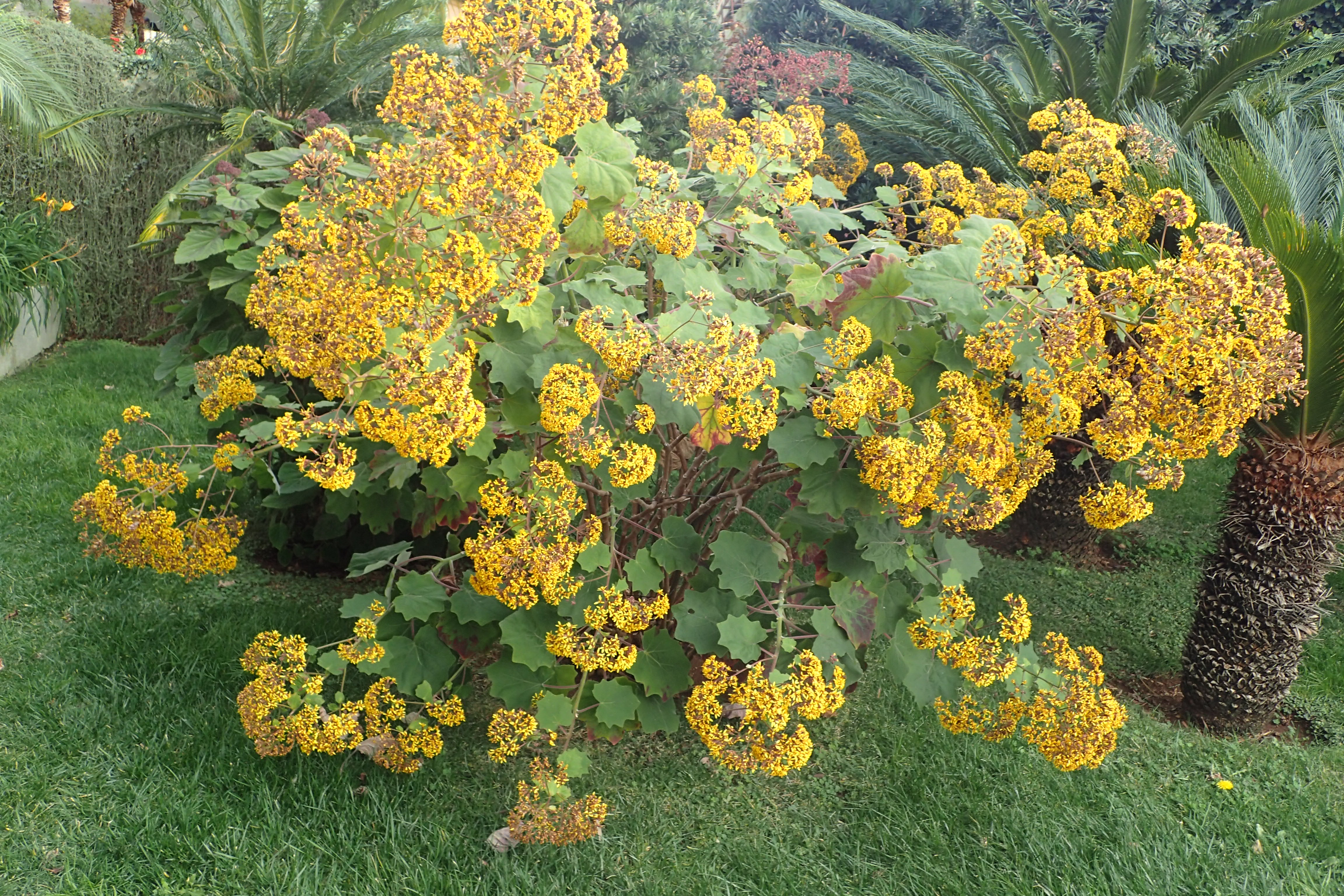
Sprawling habit

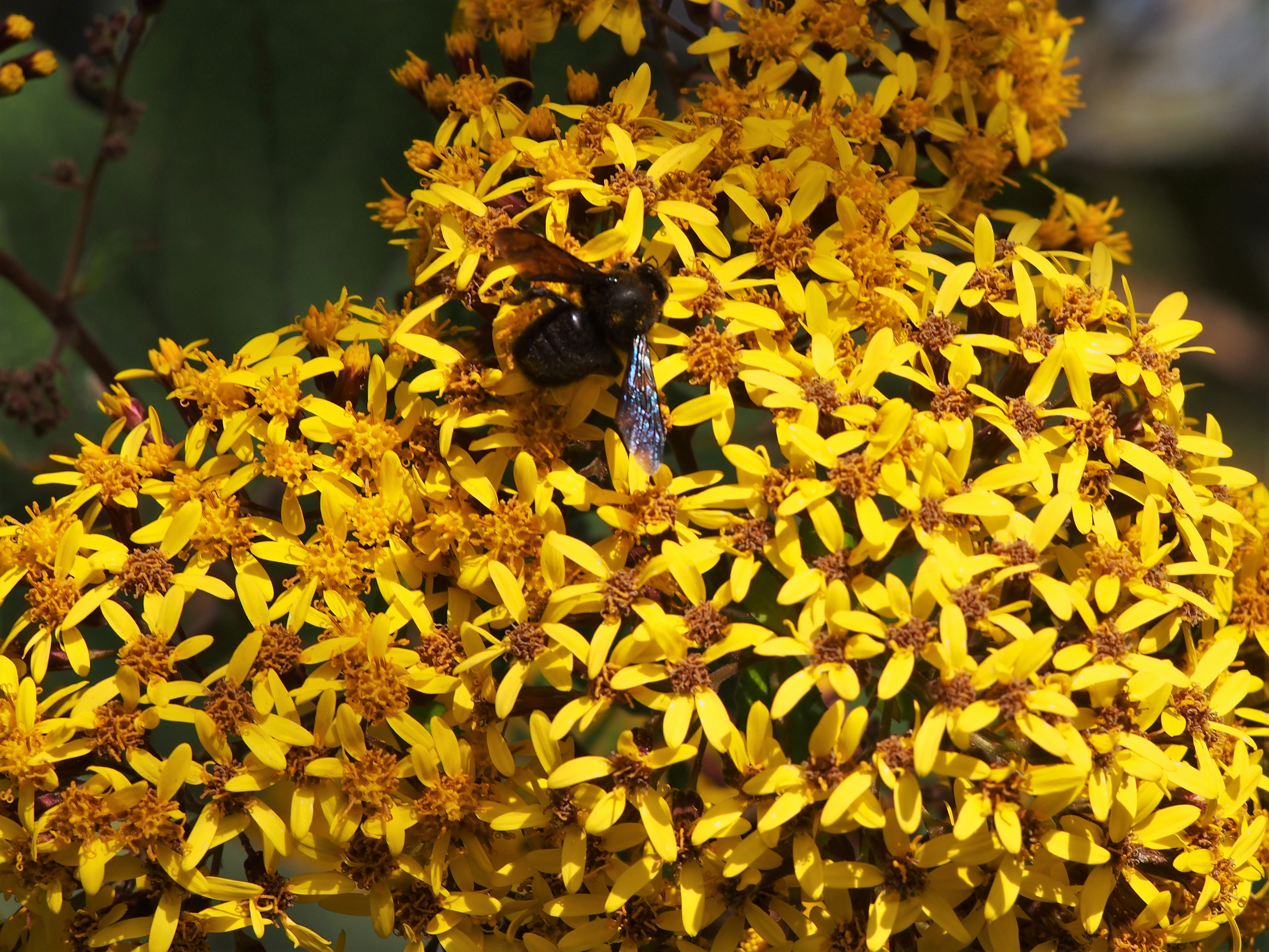
Pollination

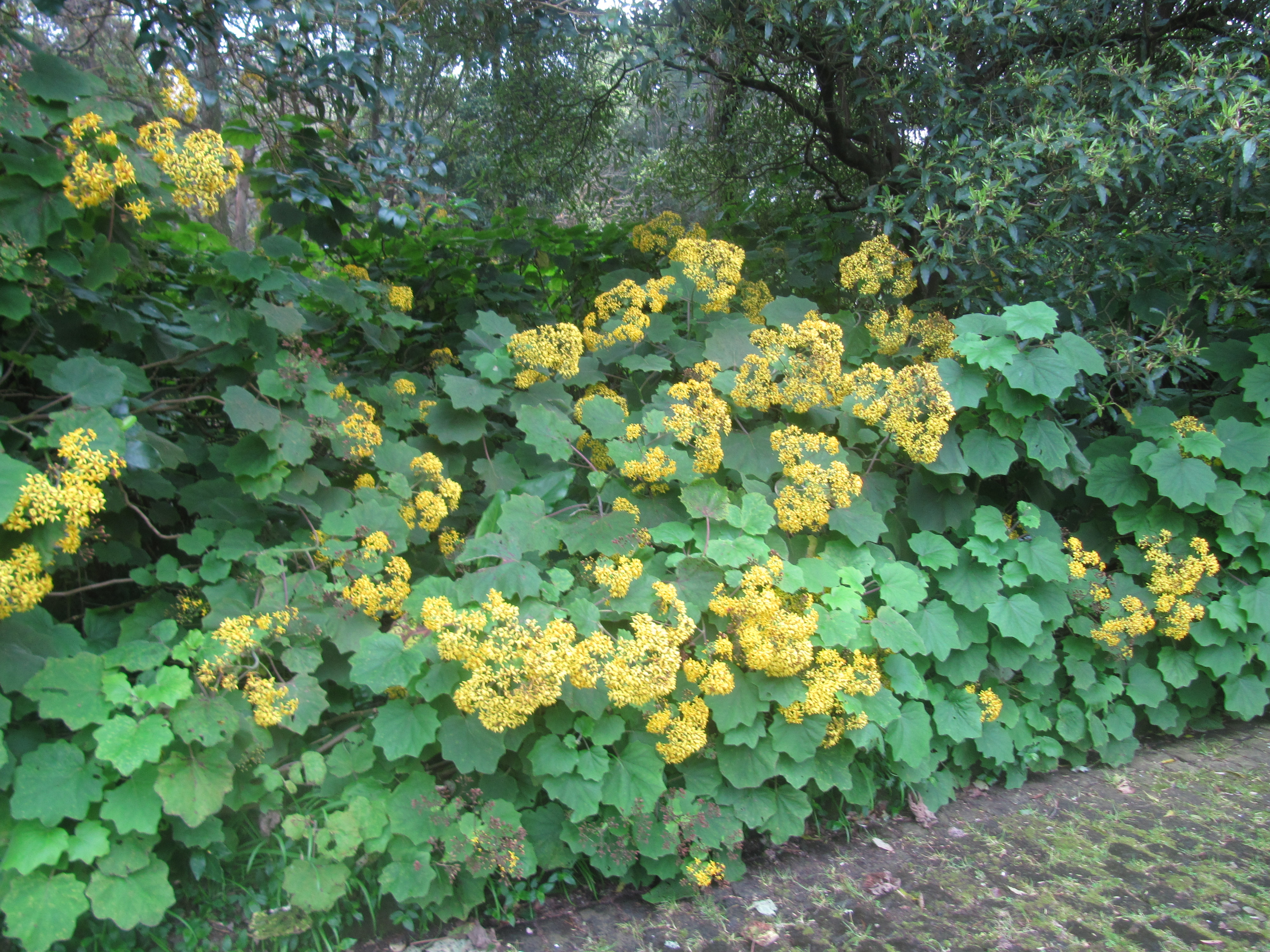
In a forest

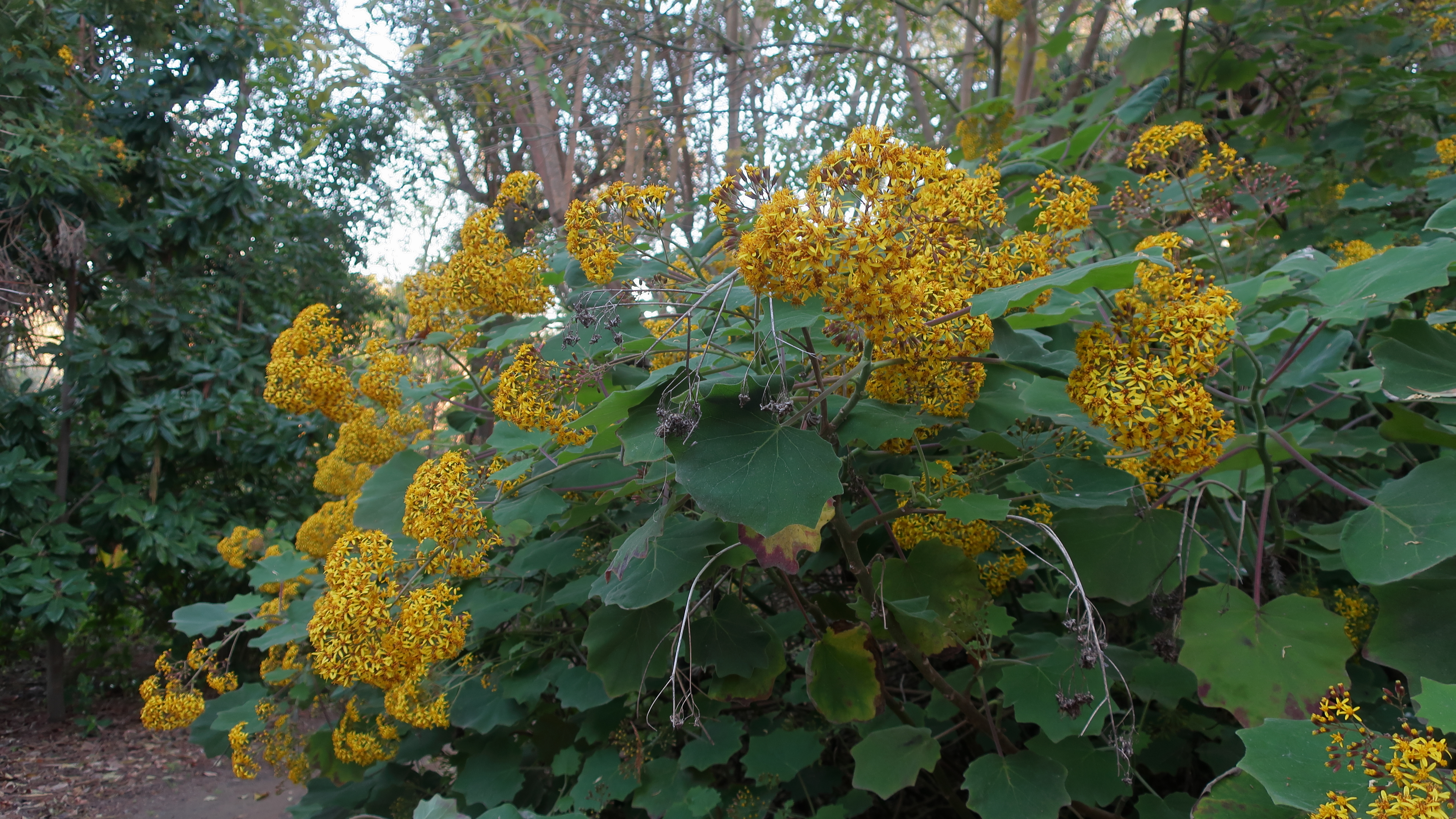
In San Diego Botanic Garden

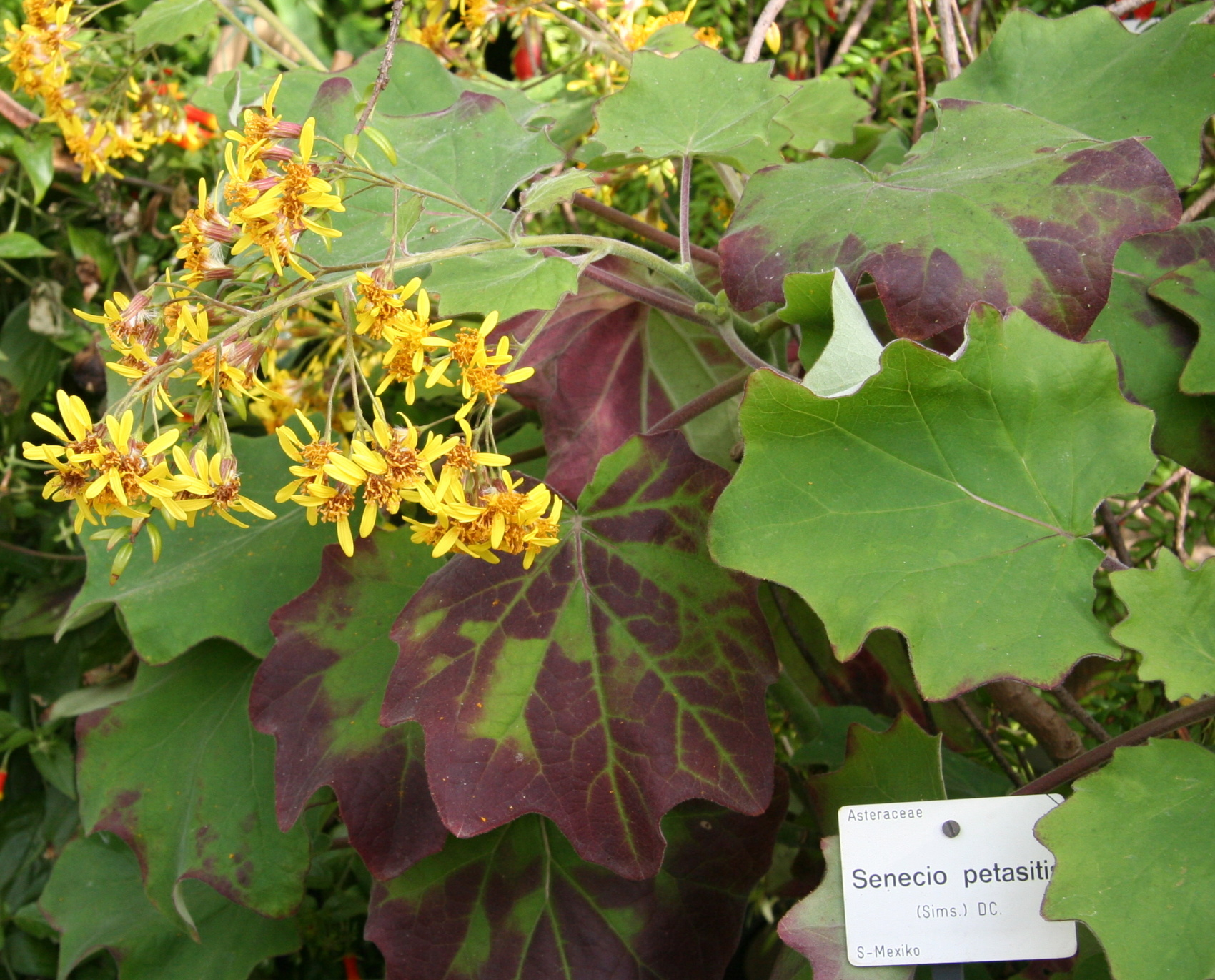
Leaves with purple shades
