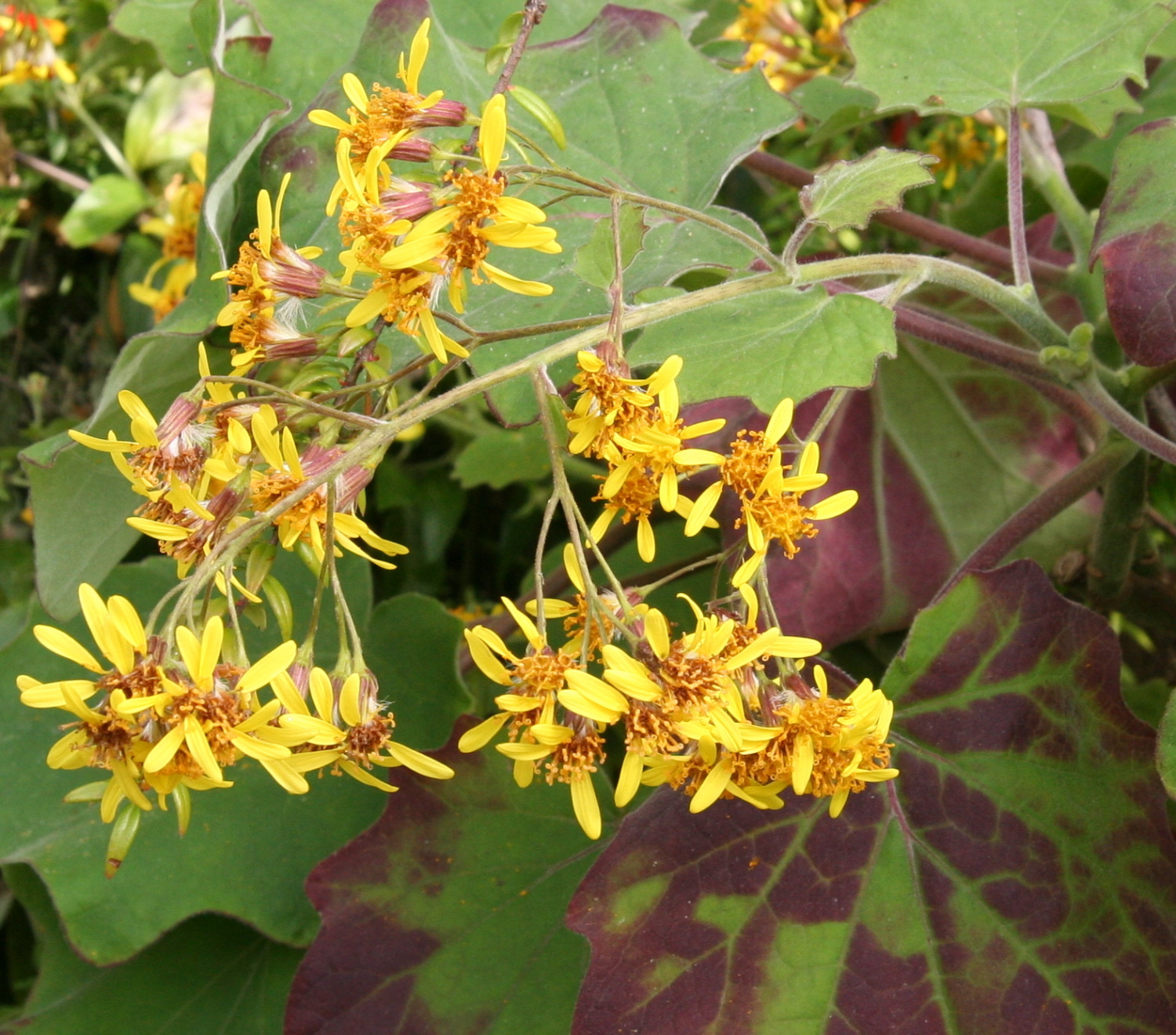
- Roldana petasitis

Scientific classification
- Kingdom: Plantae
- Clade: Embryophytes
- Clade: Tracheophytes
- Clade: Spermatophytes
- Clade: Angiosperms
- Clade: Eudicots
- Clade: Asterids
- Order: Asterales
- Family: Asteraceae
- Subfamily: Asteroideae
- Tribe: Senecioneae
- Genus: Roldana; La Llave ex Lex.

Type species
- Roldana lobata La Llave

Synonyms
- Pericalia Cass.; Senecio sect. Palmatinervii Greenm.

= Roldana =

Genus of plants

Roldana also known as groundsel is a genus of large herbs or subshrubs from the groundsel tribe within the sunflower family.

Most if not all of its members used to be members of a related genus, Senecio. The species are native to Southwest United States, Mexico and Central America and some are naturalized elsewhere.

Species

- Roldana albonervia - from Jalisco to Guatemala
- Roldana angulifolia - central Mexico
- Roldana anisophylla - Oaxaca
- Roldana barba-johannis - from Hidalgo to Honduras
- Roldana calzadana - Oaxaca
- Roldana chapalensis - central Mexico
- Roldana chiapensis - Chiapas
- Roldana cordovensis - central Mexico
- Roldana cristobalensis - Oaxaca, Chiapas, Guatemala
- Roldana ehrenbergiana - central Mexico
- Roldana eriophylla - Oaxaca, Chiapas, Guatemala
- Roldana floresiorum - Jalisco
- Roldana galiciana - Jalisco
- Roldana gesneriifolia - Durango
- Roldana gilgii - Chiapas, Guatemala
- Roldana gonzaleziae - Jalisco, Durango
- Roldana grimesii - northeastern Mexico
- Roldana guadalajarensis - west-central Mexico
- Roldana hartwegii - AZ NM TX, northwestern Mexico
- Roldana hederifolia - Michoacán, Oaxaca
- Roldana heracleifolia - central Mexico
- Roldana heterogama - Chiapas, Central America
- Roldana heteroidea - Oaxaca
- Roldana hirsuticaulis - northeastern Mexico
- Roldana jurgensenii - from Oaxacato Honduras
- Roldana kerberi - Colima, Jalisco, Oaxaca
- Roldana langlassei - Guerrero
- Roldana lanicaulis - from Tamaulipas to Guatemala
- Roldana lobata - from Jalisco to Guatemala
- Roldana manantlanensis - Jalisco
- Roldana marquesii - Veracruz, Hidalgo
- Roldana metepeca - central Mexico
- Roldana mexicana - central Mexico
- Roldana mezquitalana - Jalisco, Durango
- Roldana mixtecana - Oaxaca
- Roldana neogibsonii - central Mexico
- Roldana nesomiorum - Nuevo León, Tamaulipas
- Roldana oaxacana - Oaxaca
- Roldana pennellii - Durango
- Roldana petasitis - from Nicaragua to Hidalgo
- Roldana pinetorum - Guerrero, Oaxaca
- Roldana platanifolia - from Tamaulipas to Oaxaca
- Roldana reglensis - Veracruz
- Roldana reticulata - central Mexico
- Roldana robinsoniana - western Mexico
- Roldana sartorii - Oaxaca
- Roldana scandens - Costa Rica
- Roldana schaffneri - from Nicaragua to Veracruz
- Roldana sinuata - from Jaliscoto Oaxaca
- Roldana subpeltata - Durango, Sinaloa
- Roldana sundbergii - Nuevo León, Tamaulipas
- Roldana tepopana - Sonora
- Roldana tlacotepecana - Guerrero
- Roldana tonii - Chiapas

formerly included

several species now regarded as better suited to other genera: Senecio Trixis

'Cristobalensis', 'sartorii' and 'oaxacana' are accepted as varieties of Roldana petasitis.
