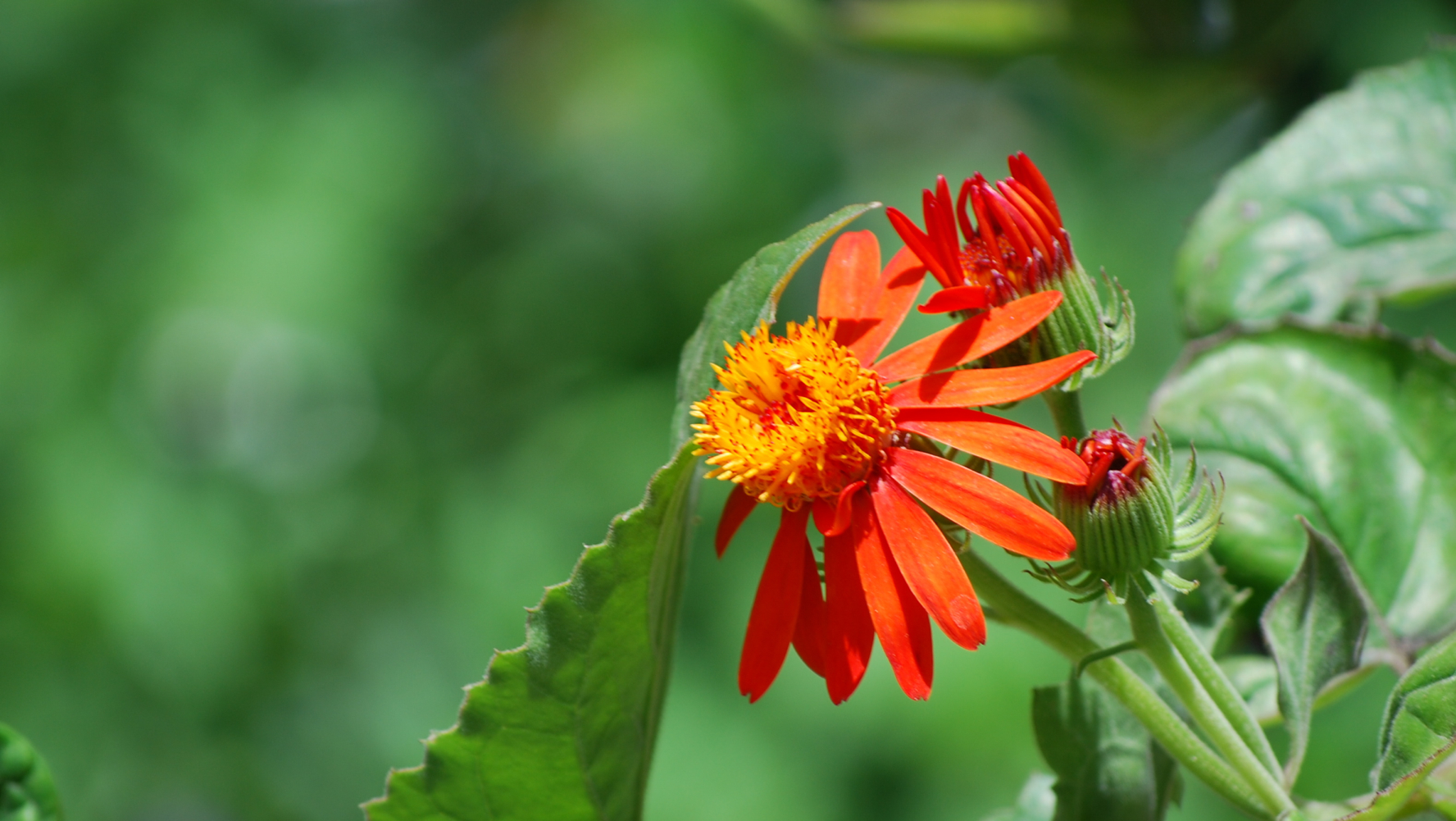
- Pseudogynoxys chenopodioides

Scientific classification
- Kingdom: Plantae
- Clade: Tracheophytes
- Clade: Angiosperms
- Clade: Eudicots
- Clade: Asterids
- Order: Asterales
- Family: Asteraceae
- Subfamily: Asteroideae
- Tribe: Senecioneae
- Genus: Pseudogynoxys (Greenm.) Cabrera (1950)

Type species
- Pseudogynoxys cordifolia (Cass.) Cabrera

Synonyms
- Senecio subg. Pseudogynoxys Greenm.

= Pseudogynoxys =

Genus of plants

Pseudogynoxys is a genus of flowering plant in the groundsel tribe within the sunflower family, native to North and South America.

Species

- Pseudogynoxys benthamii Cabrera - Paraguay, Argentina, Bolivia
- Pseudogynoxys bogotensis (Spreng.) Cuatrec. - Colombia
- Pseudogynoxys chenopodioides (Kunth) Cabrera - from Tamaulipas to Nicaragua; introduced in Florida + Texas
- Pseudogynoxys chiribogensis K.Afzel. - Ecuador
- Pseudogynoxys cordifolia (Cass.) Cabrera - Peru
- Pseudogynoxys cummingii (Benth.) H. Rob. & Cuatrec. - Mesoamerica
- Pseudogynoxys engleri (Hieron.) H. Rob. & Cuatrec. - Peru, Ecuador
- Pseudogynoxys filicalyculata (Cuatrec.) Cuatrec. - Peru, Ecuador
- Pseudogynoxys fragans (Hook.) H.Rob. & Cuatrec. - Guatemala
- Pseudogynoxys haenkei (DC.) Cabrera - Mesoamerica
- Pseudogynoxys lobata Pruski - Brazil, Bolivia
- Pseudogynoxys poeppigii (DC.) H.Rob. & Cuatrec. - Peru
- Pseudogynoxys pohlii (Baker) Leitão - Brazil
- Pseudogynoxys scabra (Benth.) Cuatrec. - Peru, Ecuador
- Pseudogynoxys sodiroi (Hieron.) Cuatrec. - Ecuador
- Pseudogynoxys sonchoides (Kunth) Cuatrec. - Peru, Ecuador
