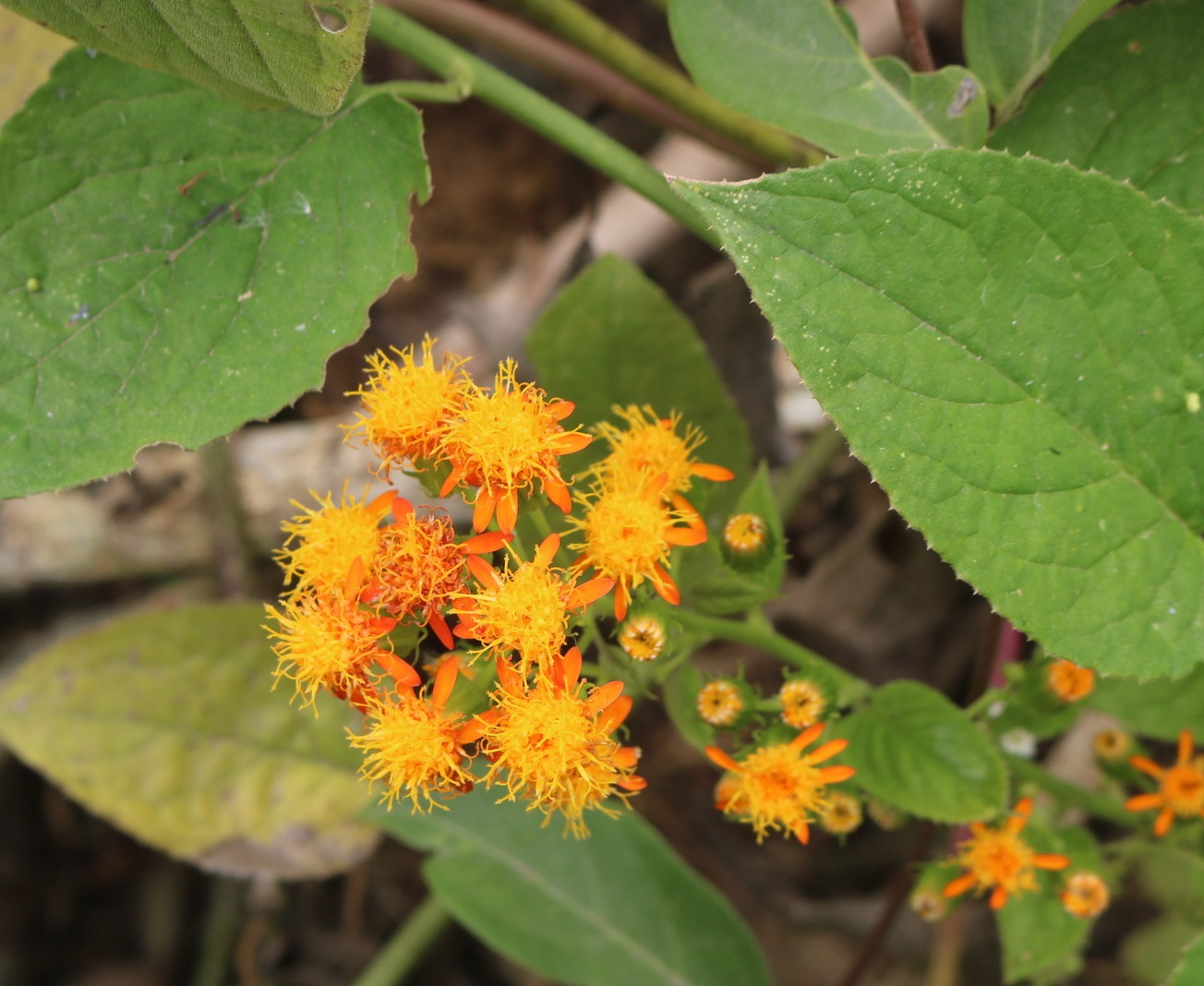

Conservation status
- Endangered (IUCN 3.1)

Scientific classification
- Kingdom: Plantae
- Clade: Tracheophytes
- Clade: Angiosperms
- Clade: Eudicots
- Clade: Asterids
- Order: Asterales
- Family: Asteraceae
- Genus: Pseudogynoxys
- Species: P. engleri

Binomial name
- Pseudogynoxys engleri (Hieron.) H.Rob. & Cuatrec.

= Pseudogynoxys engleri =

Species of plant

Pseudogynoxys engleri is a species of flowering plant in the family Asteraceae. It is found only in Ecuador. Its natural habitats are subtropical or tropical dry forests, subtropical or tropical moist lowland forests, and subtropical or tropical moist montane forests. It is threatened by habitat loss.
