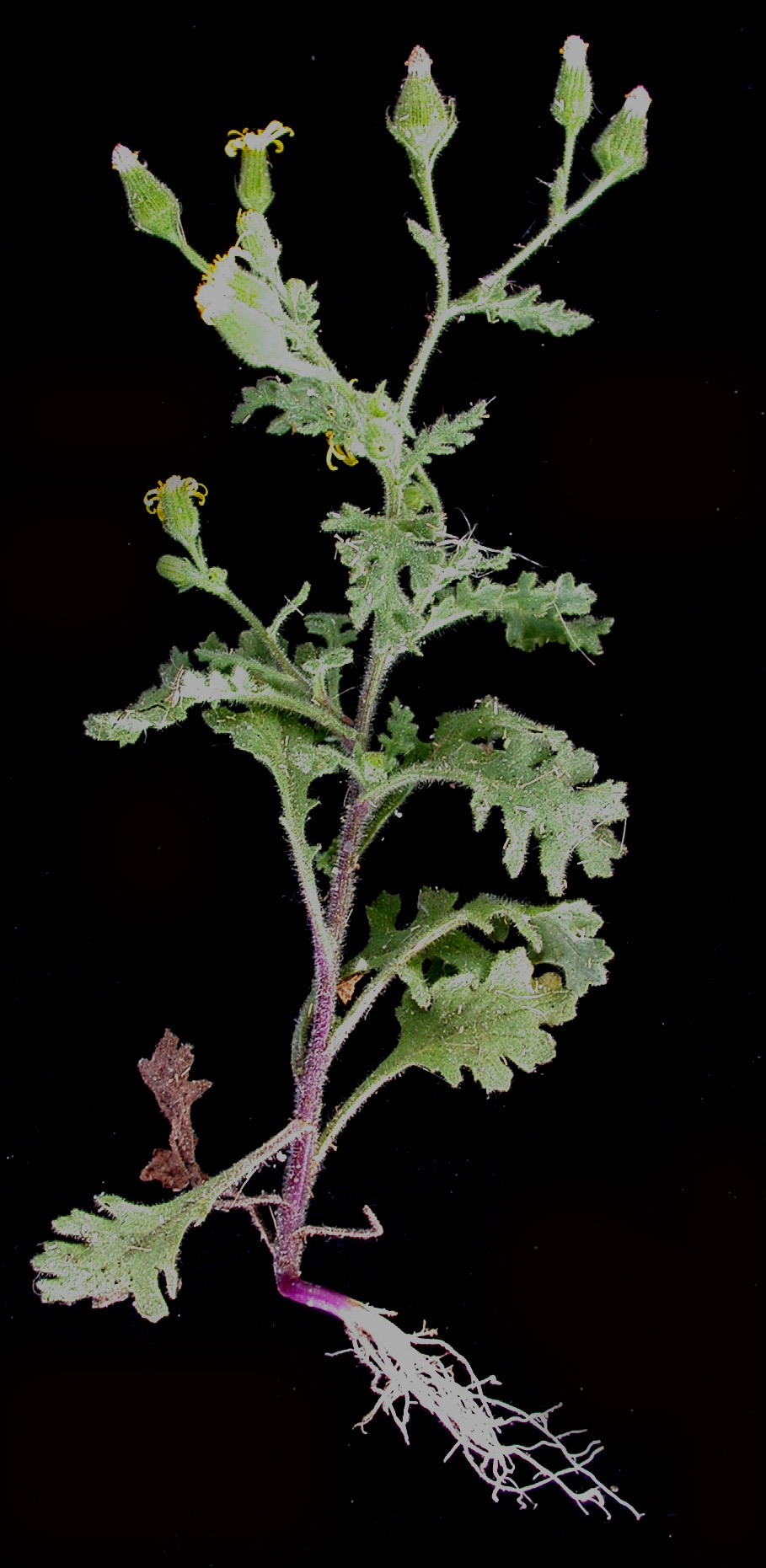

Scientific classification
- Kingdom: Plantae
- Clade: Tracheophytes
- Clade: Angiosperms
- Clade: Eudicots
- Clade: Asterids
- Order: Asterales
- Family: Asteraceae
- Genus: Senecio
- Species: S. viscosus

Binomial name
- Senecio viscosus L.

Synonyms
- Synonymy: Jacobaea viscosa Gilib.; Obaejaca viscosa Cass.; Senecio vulgaris subsp. viscosus (L.) Bonnier & Layens; Senecio calvertii Boiss.; Senecio glutinosus Schur; Senecio tymphresteus Boiss. & Heldr.; Seneciunculus viscosus Opiz

= Senecio viscosus =

Species of flowering plant

Senecio viscosus is a herbaceous annual plant of the genus Senecio. It is known as the sticky ragwort, sticky groundsel, or stinking groundsel.

== Description ==
An annual, growing to 70 cm high and covered with glandular hairs. Very similar to Senecio sylvaticus which does not have glandular hairs. The outer bracts show a brown tip. The ray-florets are ligulate, yellow and at first spreading then rolled back. The leaves are alternate and deeply lobed. Senecio vulgaris (Groundsel) does not have ray florets.

== Distribution ==
Locally common in Britain and Ireland on waste ground. According to the USDA Plants database, the species has also been introduced in the United States (Pennsylvania, New York, Vermont, New Hampshire, Maine, Massachusetts, Connecticut, Rhode Island, Michigan, Wisconsin, Illinois, Idaho, Alaska) and Canada (British Columbia, Alberta, Saskatchewan, Manitoba, Ontario, Quebec, New Brunswick, Nova Scotia, Prince Edward Island, and Newfoundland and Labrador).

== Taxonomy ==
Senecio viscosus was first named and described by Carl von Linnaeus in 1753 in the book Species Plantarum.
