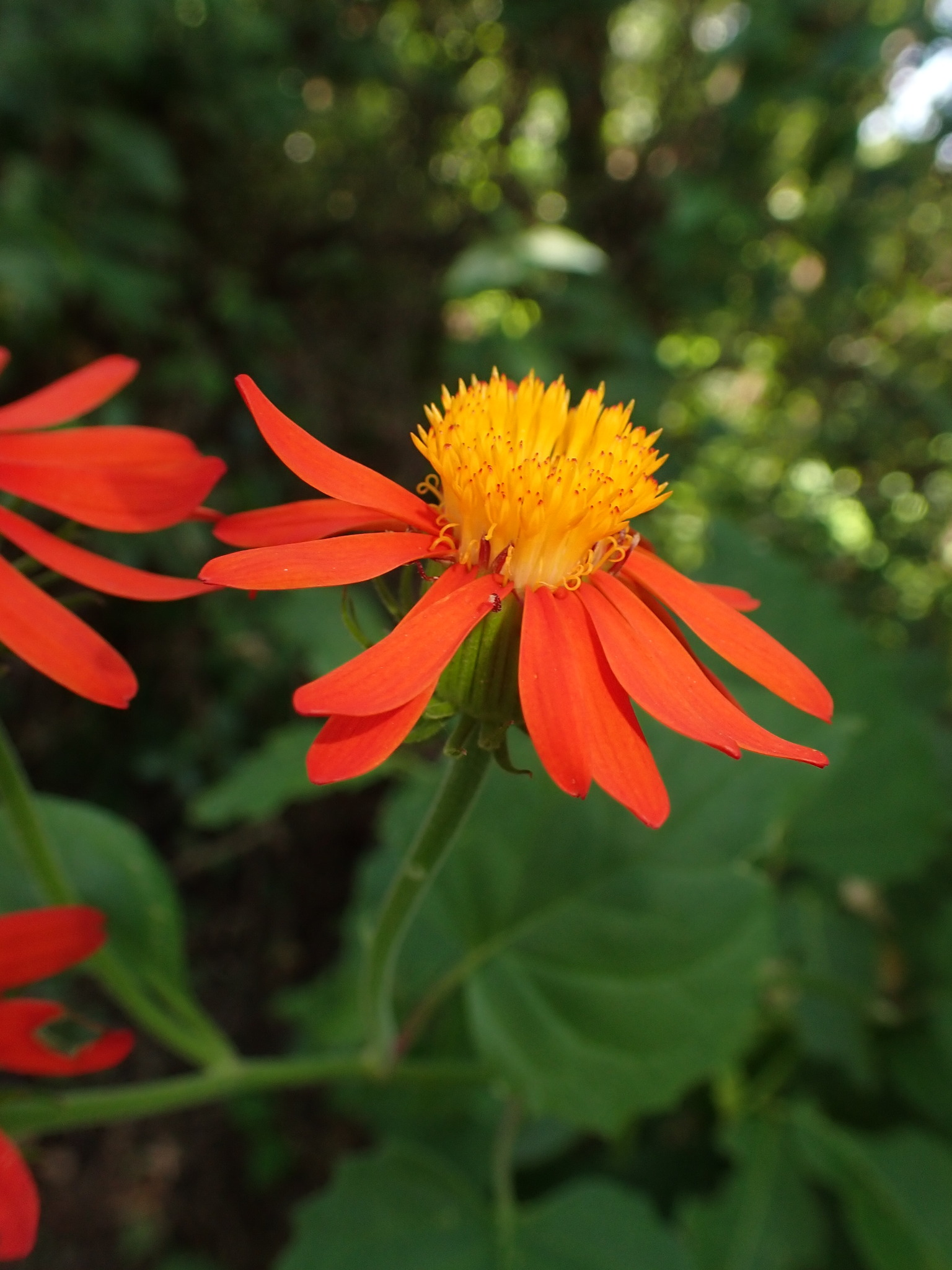

Scientific classification
- Kingdom: Plantae
- Clade: Tracheophytes
- Clade: Angiosperms
- Clade: Eudicots
- Clade: Asterids
- Order: Asterales
- Family: Asteraceae
- Genus: Pseudogynoxys
- Species: P. benthamii

Binomial name
- Pseudogynoxys benthamii Cabrera (1950)

Synonyms
- Senecio benthamii Baker; Pseudogynoxys cabrerae H.Rob. & Cuatrec.

= Pseudogynoxys benthamii =

Species of plant

Pseudogynoxys benthamii is a species of the genus Pseudogynoxys and family Asteraceae. It is a native of Argentina, Bolivia and Paraguay.
