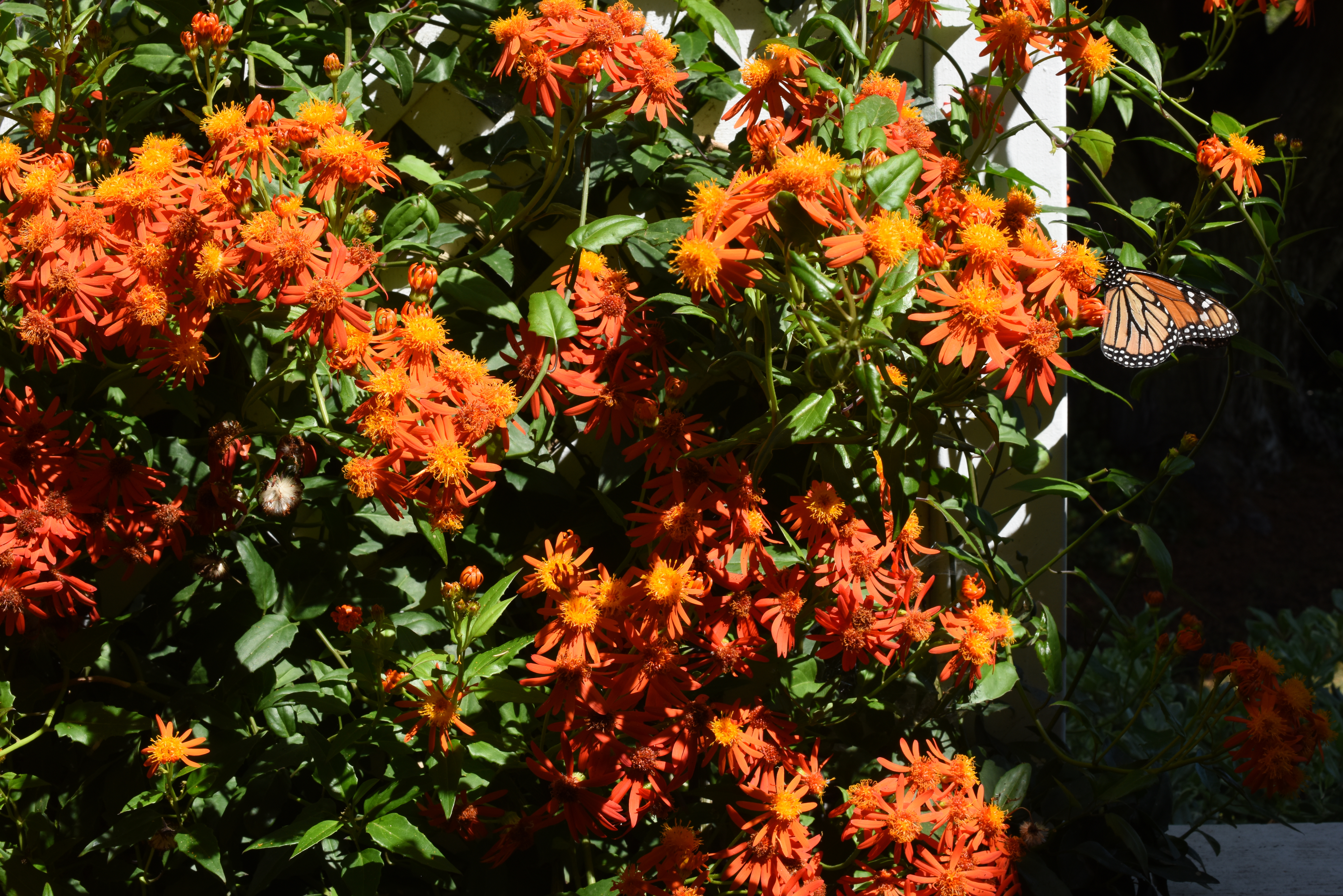

Scientific classification
- Kingdom: Plantae
- Clade: Tracheophytes
- Clade: Angiosperms
- Clade: Eudicots
- Clade: Asterids
- Order: Asterales
- Family: Asteraceae
- Genus: Pseudogynoxys
- Species: P. chenopodioides

Binomial name
- Pseudogynoxys chenopodioides (Kunth) Cabrera

Synonyms
- Numerous: Gynoxys berlandieri DC.; Gynoxys berlandieri var. cordifolia DC.; Gynoxys berlandieri var. cuneata DC.; Gynoxys cordifolia Cass.; Gynoxys fragrans Hook.; Gynoxys haenkei DC.; Pseudogynoxys berlandieri (DC.) Cabrera; Pseudogynoxys haenkei (DC.) Cabrera; Pseudogynoxys hoffmannii (Klatt) Cuatrec.; Senecio berlandieri (DC.) Hemsl.; Senecio calocephalus Hemsl.; Senecio calocephalus Poepp.; Senecio chenopodioides Kunth; Senecio chinotegensis Klatt; Senecio confusus Britten; Senecio convolvuloides Greenm.; Senecio hemsleyi Britten; Senecio hoffmannii Klatt; Senecio kermesinus Hemsl.; Senecio rothschuhianus Greenm.; Senecio skinneri Hemsl.

= Pseudogynoxys chenopodioides =

Species of plant

Pseudogynoxys chenopodioides (syn. Senecio confusus), known commonly as Mexican flamevine, orange-flowered groundsel and orange glow vine, is a climber in the family Asteraceae, native to Central America and northern South America. It is a vigorous vine with thick evergreen, deep green leaves and bright orange daisy-like flowers, which are borne in clusters, and usually bloom all year round.

== Description ==
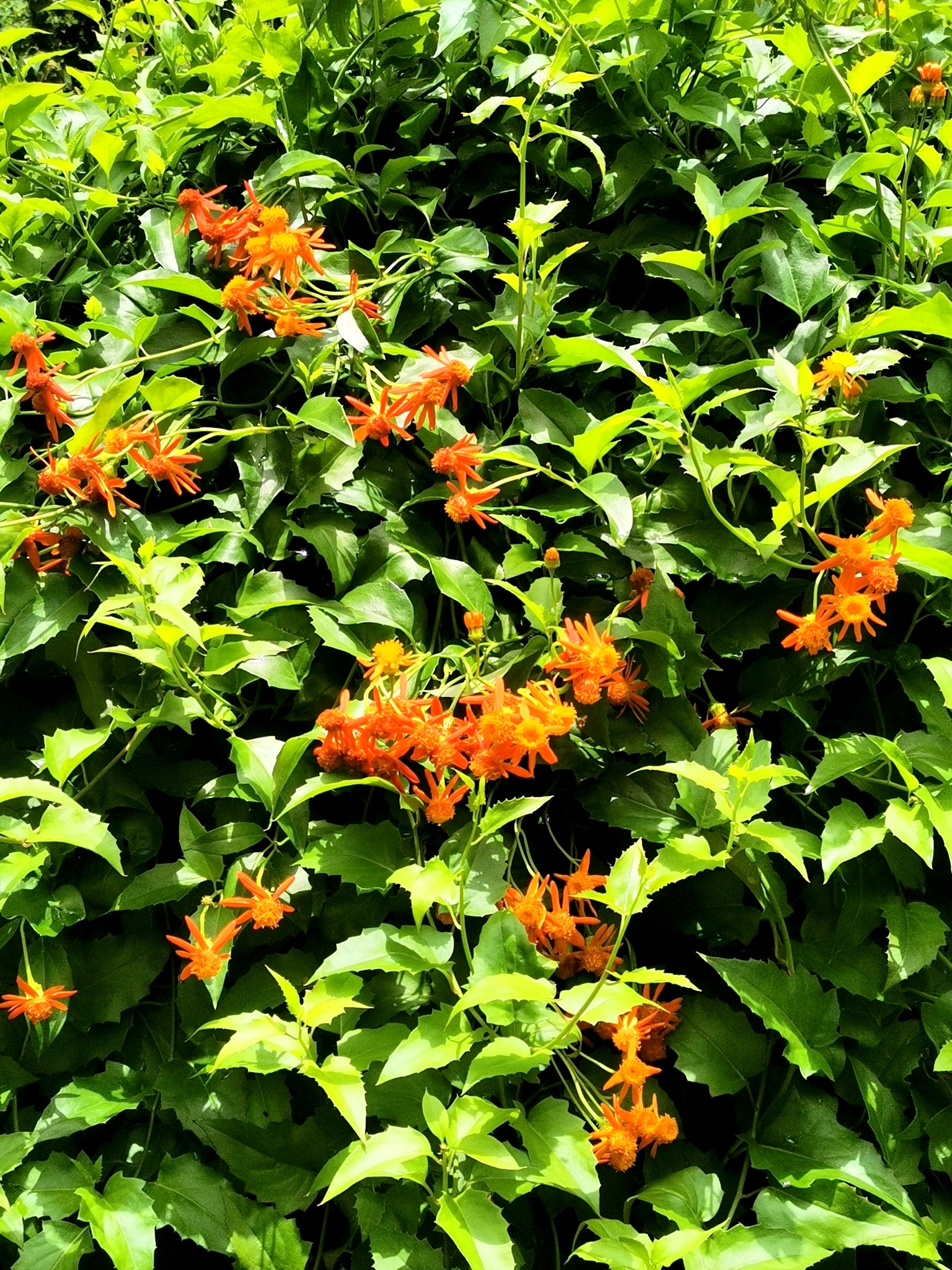
Leaves and flowers

Pseudogynoxys chenopodioides is a fast-growing, twining, herbaceous vine that reaches a height of 5 metres (16 ft) to 10 metres (33 ft).

It features smooth, subcylindrical, glabrous or puberulous stems that become slightly woody as they age. Its evergreen leaves are simple, dull, alternate, arrowhead-shaped, toothed or serrated, 2-4 inches long, glabrous, somewhat fleshy, ovate to lanceolate, often unequal, membranaceous with conspicuous venation, slightly cordiform and obtuse base, and acute apex. Its petioles are 1.5-2.2 cm long.

=== Inflorescences ===
It features moderately scented, daisy-like, orange ray flowers (which age to a bright red or vermilion upon pollination) that are 1 inch in diameter with golden tubular corollas on terminal clusters. Capitula is 2-6 cm, pedunculate, in terminal corymbiform cymes. Peduncle is 2-5 cm in diameter. The phyllaries are green, lanceolate, 4 mm long. Achenes are turbinate and hispidulous, 4 mm in diameter.

Polycarpic, the plant will sporadically bloom all year-round in mild winter climates, though generally peaking in spring and summer. In Florida, it tends to flower in autumn and winter more, and in Puerto Rico it flowers from late winter to early spring.

The fruits are ribbed, inconspicuous, oval-shaped brown less than 0.5 inches in diameter, with persistent bristles. Its seeds are wind dispersed and its fruit resemble dandelion seed heads. White and bristly cypselae that are 2-4mm long are continual on plant.

=== Taxonomy ===
The plant's former scientific name Senecio confusus translates to "confused old man", which refers to the pappus bristles on the achenes and the vine's rampant, irregular habit of growth, respectively. Without support, a "confusion" of stems change the plant into a straggly shrub.

Its current taxonomic name Pseudogynoxys chenopodioides refer to its "pseudo" resemblance to some of the species within the gynoxys and chenopodioideae genus. 'Gynoxys' is derived from Greek terms of 'gyne' (female) and 'oxys' (spiny), which refers to the shape of the plant's female flower parts. 'Chenopodioides' means 'resembling goosefoot' in Greek (chen: goose, pous: foot), which describes the leaf shape.

== Distribution ==
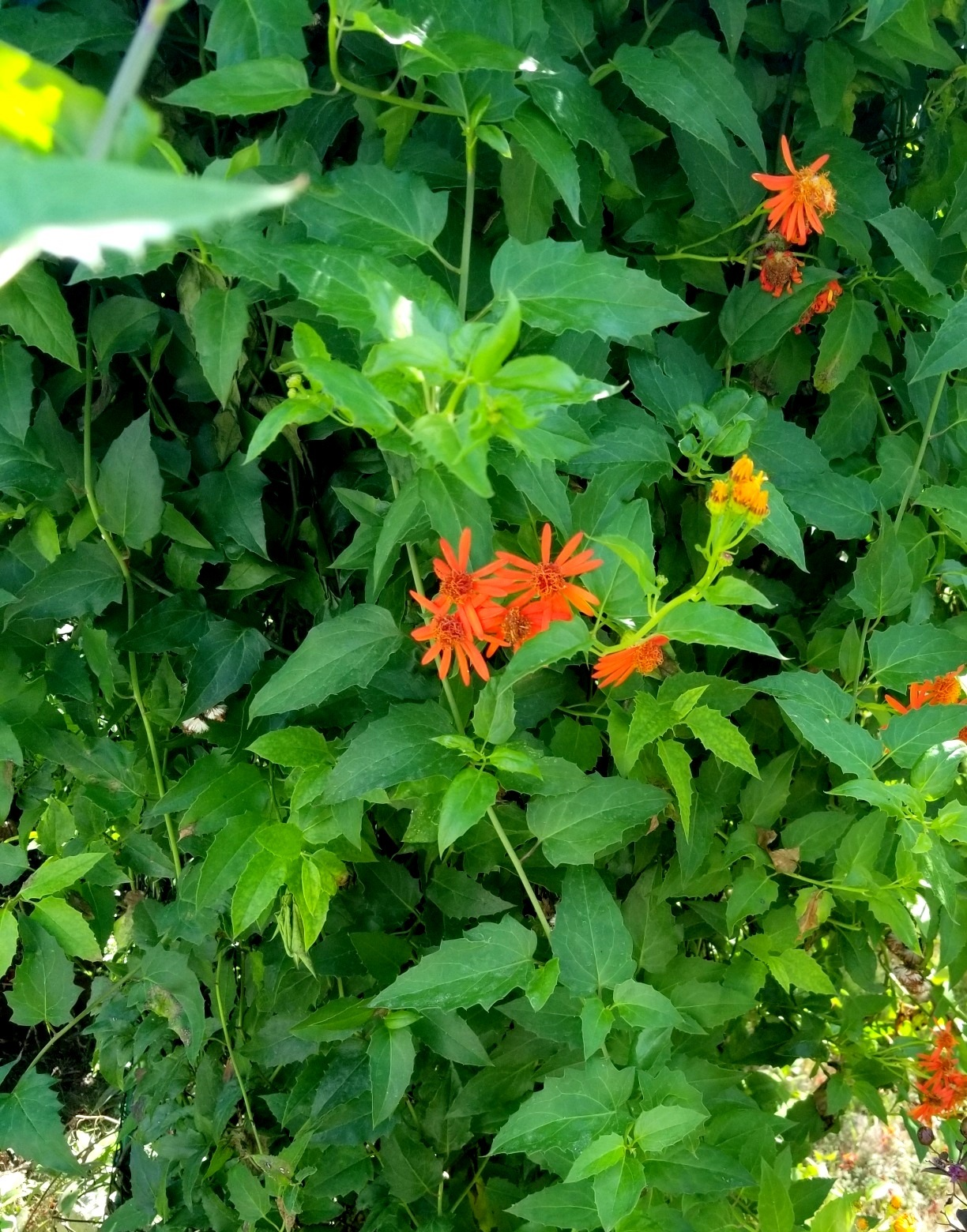
Rambling habit on a fence

It is native from Mexico (specifically Veracruz) to Honduras in Central America, and can be found as far south as tropical South America in Venezuela, Colombia, Guyana and Suriname, and as far north as southwestern United States in Southern California.

It has been naturalized in Hawaii (Oahu), Puerto Rico, other parts of the Caribbean, possibly the Canary Islands, United States (such as Texas and the Gulf Coast), India, Singapore and on various islands in the Pacific Ocean, and is an adventive plant in Florida.

It generally thrives in moist habits (though it can tolerate mildly dry climates and moderate drought). Versatile, it can survive in elevations exceeding 2200 m.

=== Invasiveness ===
Due to its distribution ability by wind-dispersed seeds and stem fragments (which can root readily), it has become an escaped plant that is naturalized along roadsides, forest edges, moist thickets and disturbed sites.

As such, it has been listed as invasive in Anguilla, Hawaii, and it is considered potentially invasive in Florida and Galapagos Islands due to its aggressive habit of spreading and rapidly colonizing new environments.

== Cultivation ==
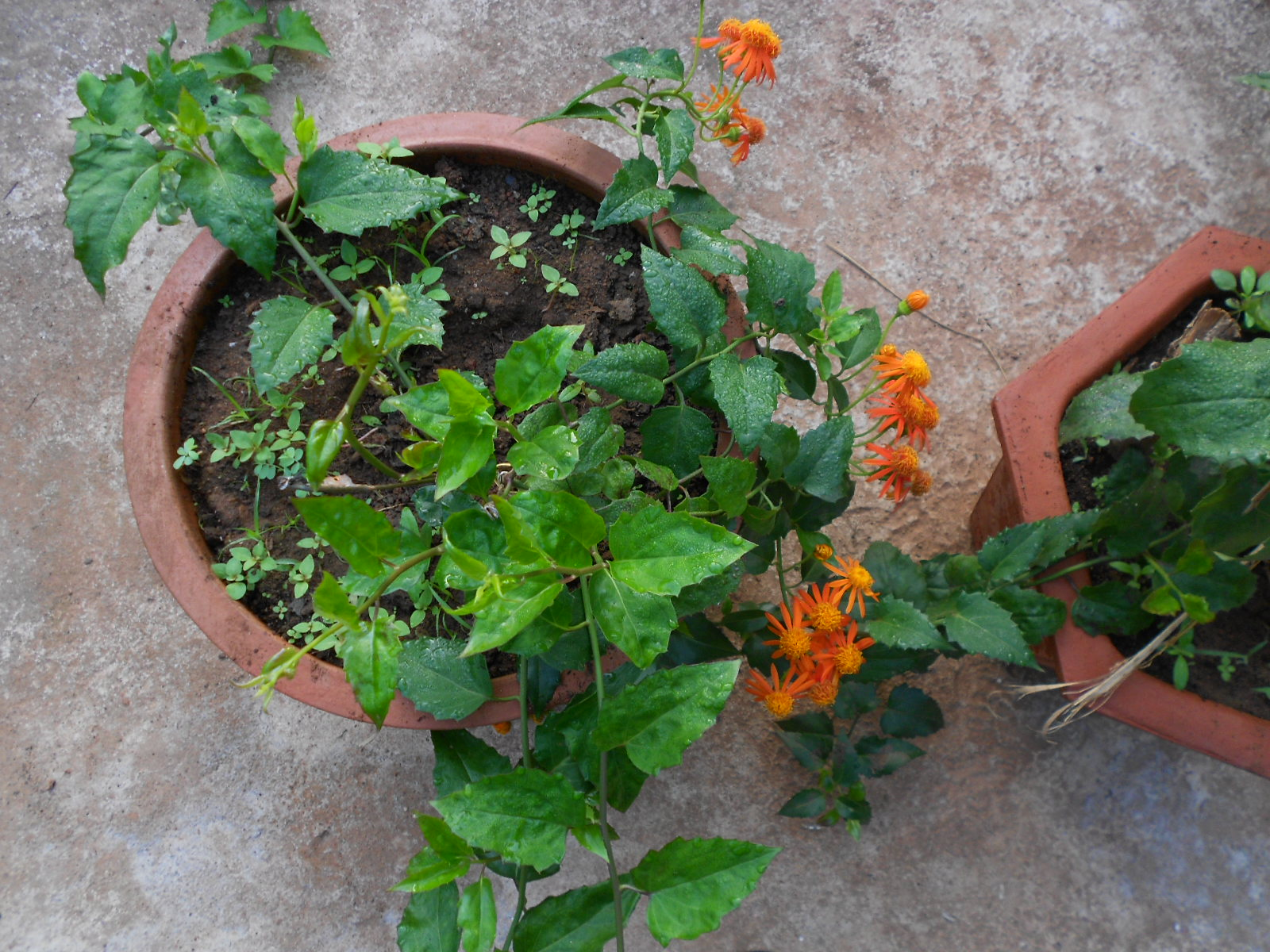
Potted houseplant

The Mexican flamevine is prized as an ornamental because of its showy flowers, which are pollinated by butterflies, hummingbirds and bees. It is widely grown in gardens in parts of the United States in hardiness zones 10 through 11 as a climber or groundcover, though it can be hardy down to -6.7 °C (20 °F) in zone 9a. It requires full sun, well-drained soil, and either a trellis or a shrub to climb on.

Its fast growth is ideal to cover unsightly fences (since it usually reaches maturity within the first year). Regular heading aids foliage growth and blooms at the bottom of a fence or trellis. If not pruned, foliage and flowers will generally pile up at the top. Spent flowerheads should be occasionally removed to boost blooming all across plant.

In colder areas, frost will kill the shoots, but the roots can survive the winter in most of the contiguous United States. It can be grown as an annual plant in a cold climate due to its rapid growth rate. If not grown as a vine, it will grow in a sprawling shrub-like form. It is moderately drought-tolerant and prefers usually wet, somewhat alkaline clay, sand, acidic and loam soils. The plant is mildly toxic if indigested, and handling it may usually result in dermatitis and an itching rash. It is toxic to dogs, cats and horses.

It has been cultivated in Hawaii with one naturalization record since the early 1940s. It has been cultivated in Florida since 1939, with low to moderate availability, and has been reported as persisting after cultivation there, growing on disturbed sites. It is also sold under the name 'São Paulo'.

=== Pests ===
P. chenopodioides is a nonhost of Digitivalva delaireae and this moth is an ineffective biocontrol of the plant. Nematodes, mites, scales, and caterpillars can also disturb the plant. Leaves may have irregular reddish-purple patches, either due to nutrient deficiency, or infestation by Alternaria senecionis, a fungus which causes leaf lesions. Nonetheless, the plant is rarely bothered by any pests, therefore making it good for beginners.

== Gallery ==
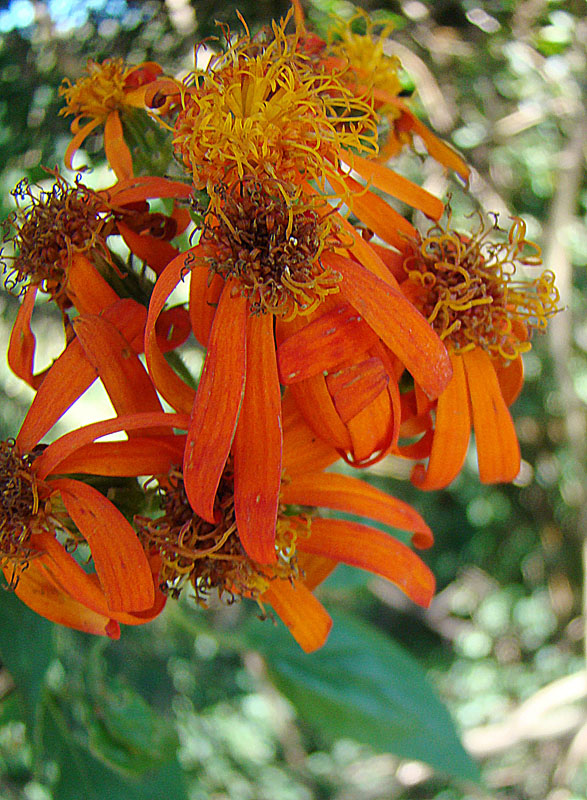

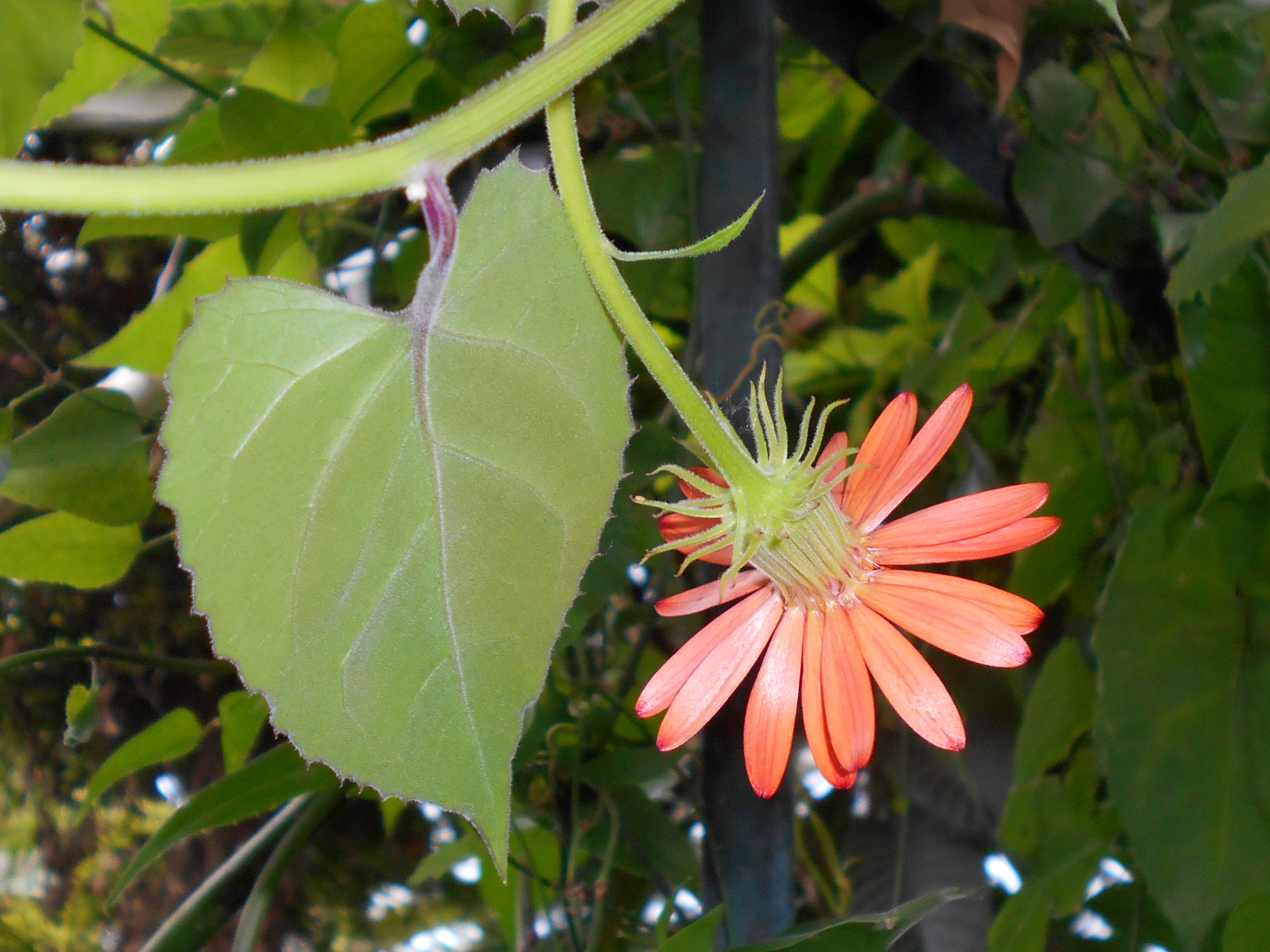

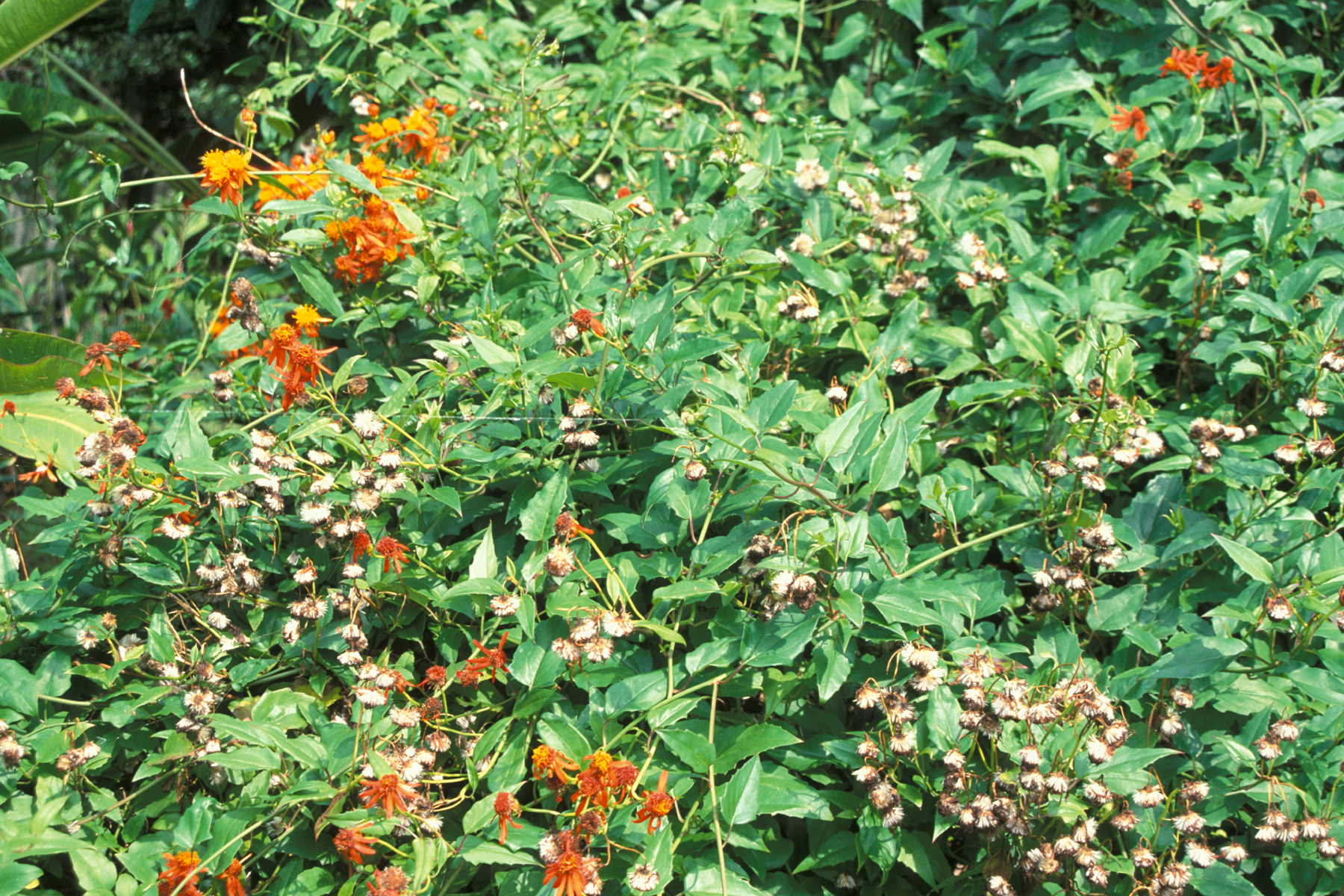

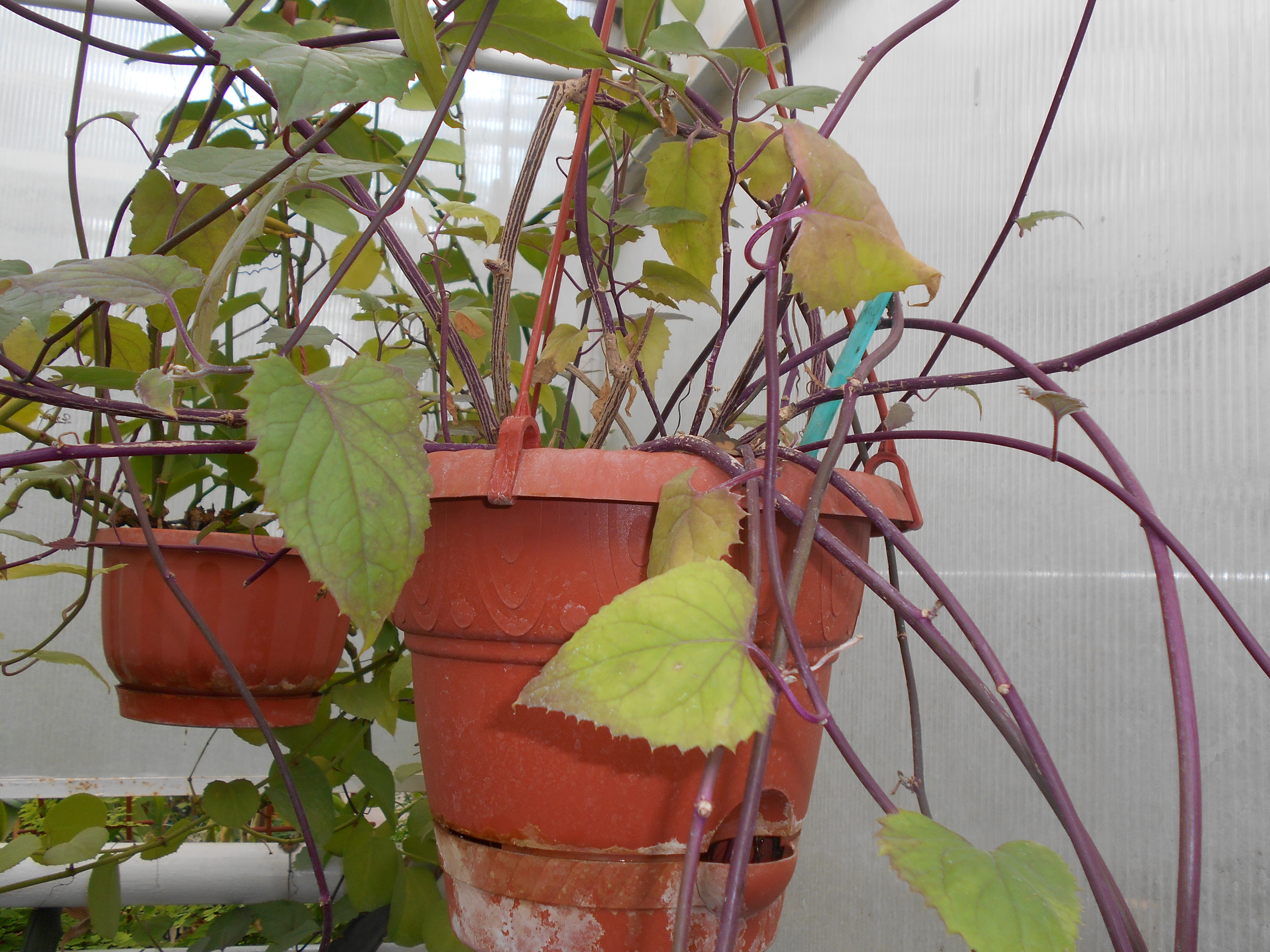

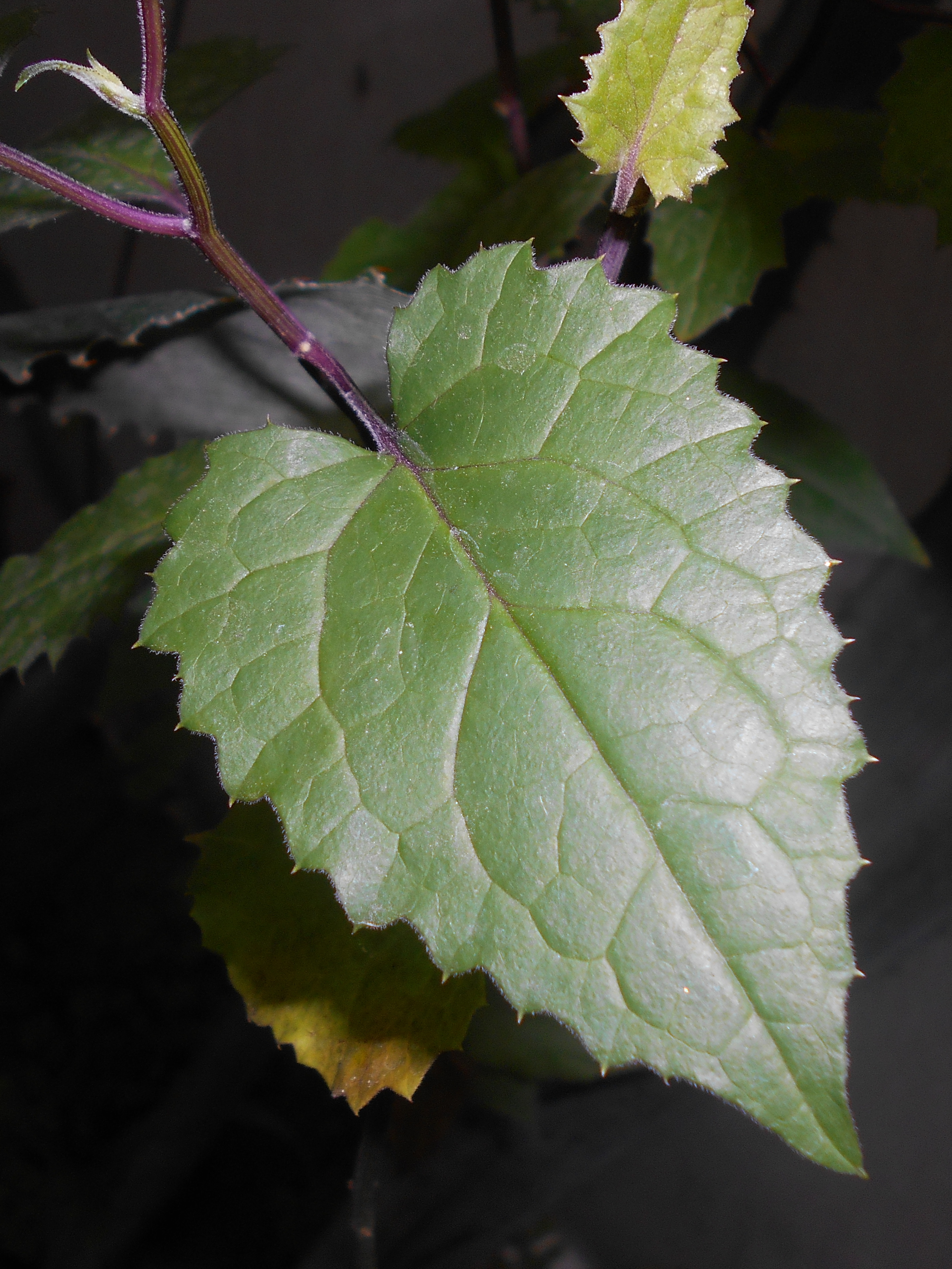

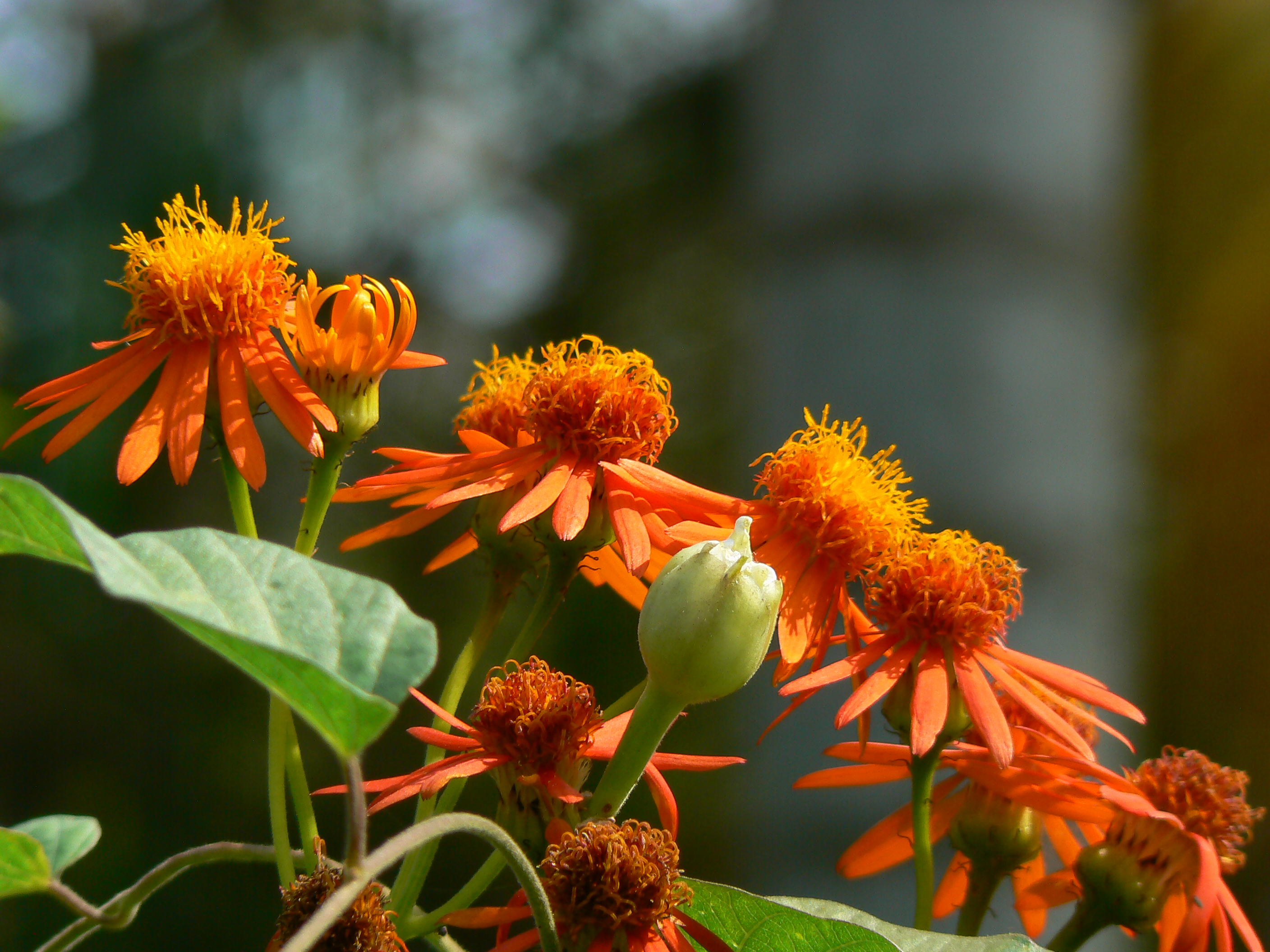

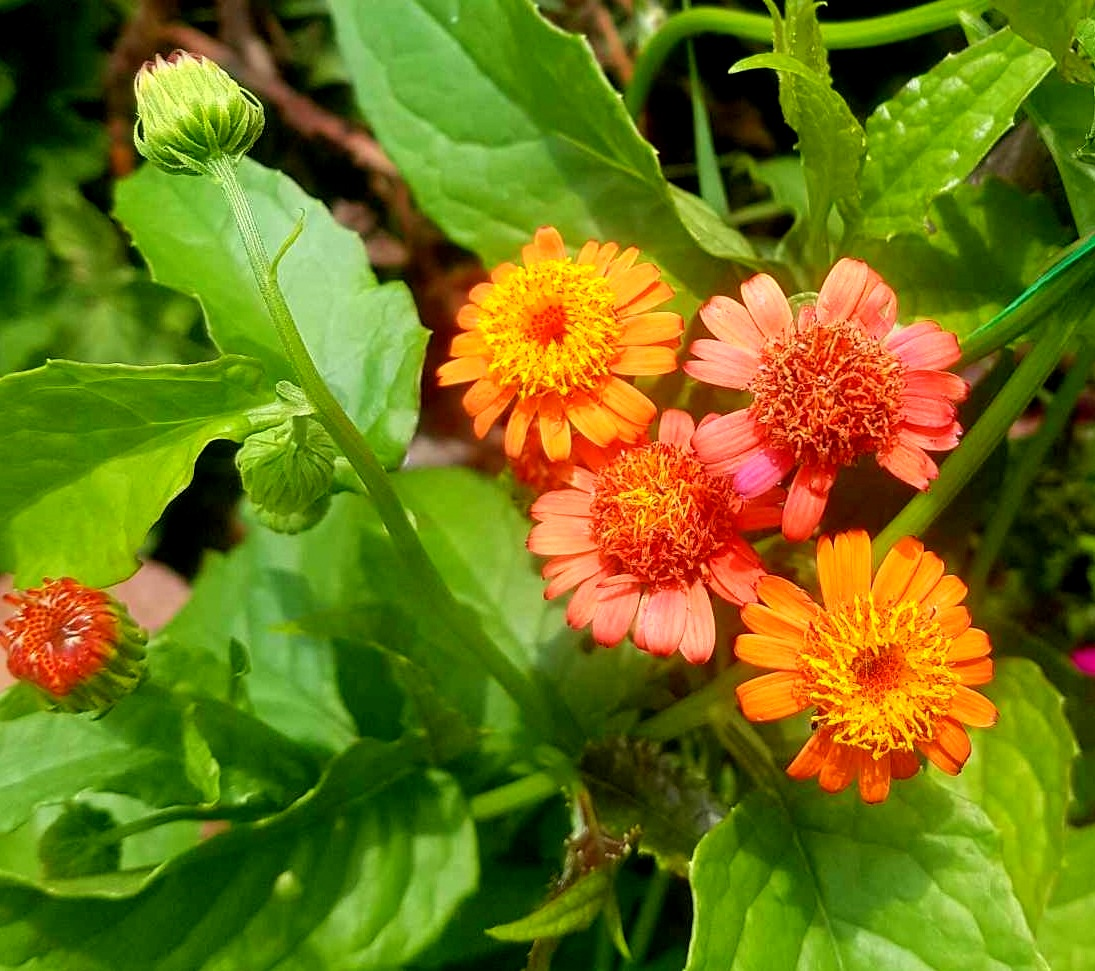
Cultivar or hybrid with small flowers

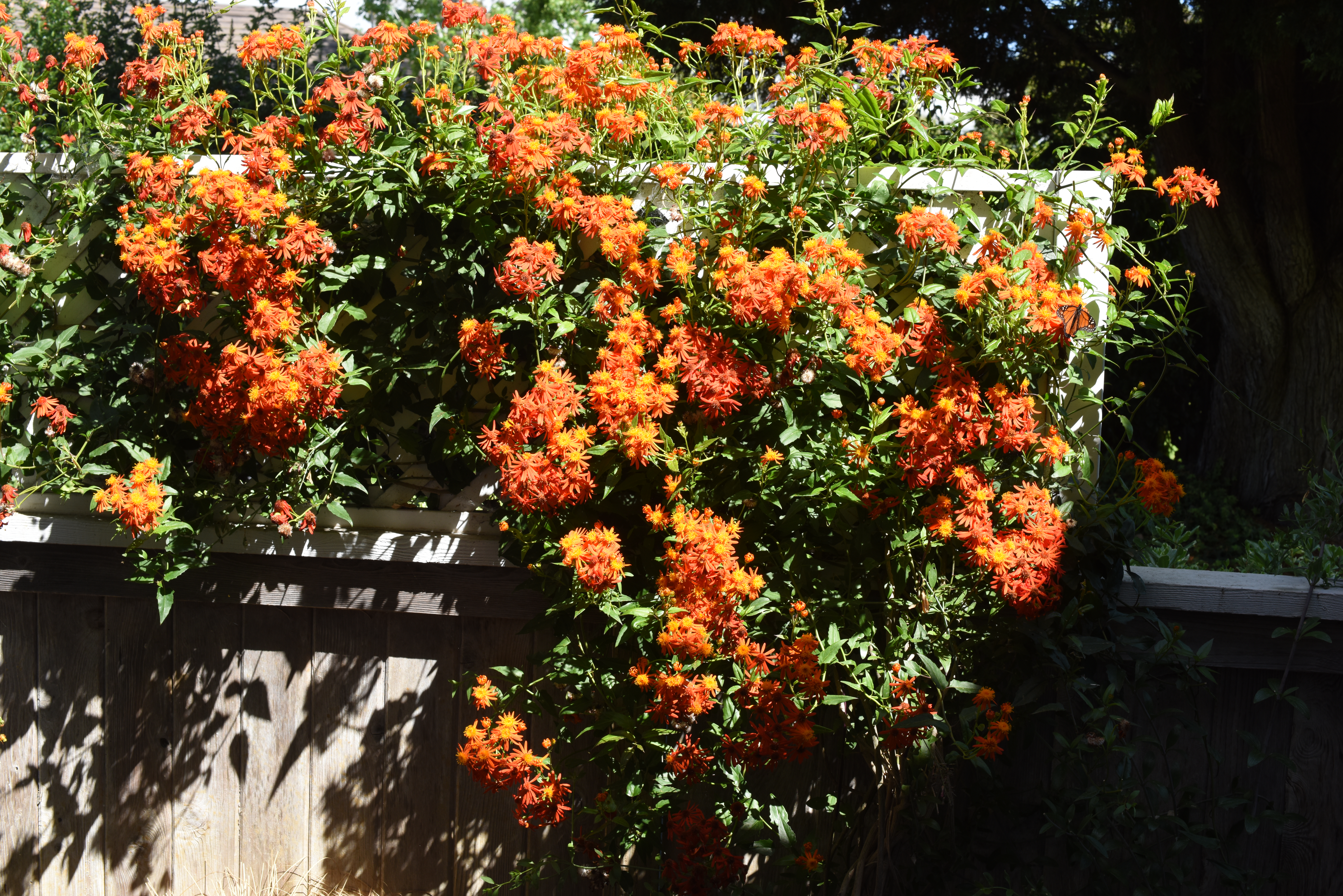
On a trellis in California

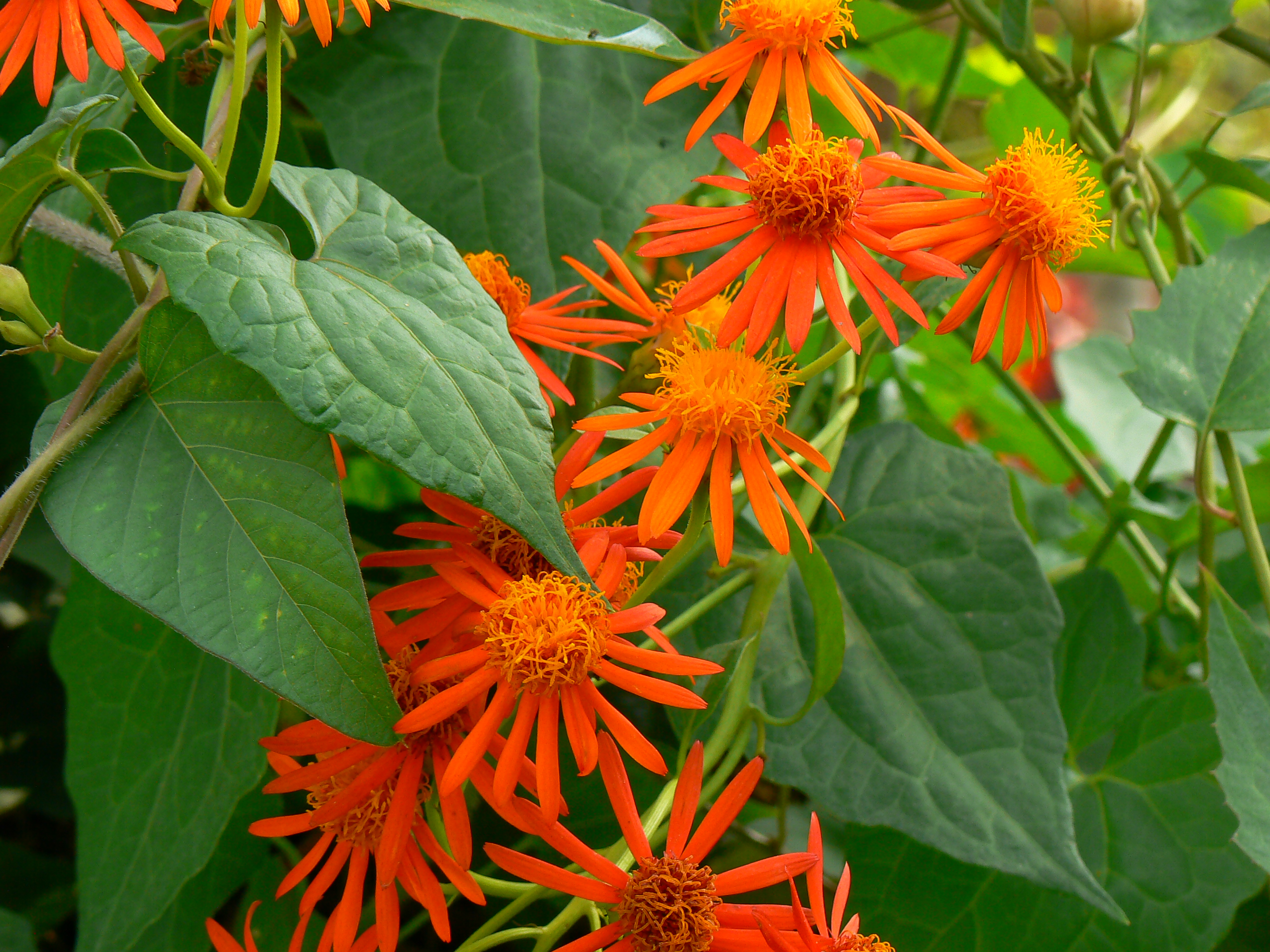
