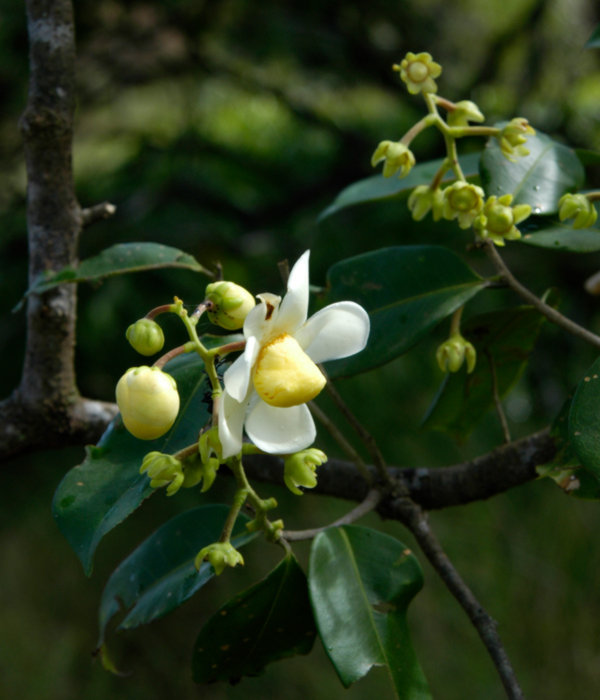
- Eschweilera (probably E. ovata)

Scientific classification
- Kingdom: Plantae
- Clade: Tracheophytes
- Clade: Angiosperms
- Clade: Eudicots
- Clade: Asterids
- Order: Ericales
- Family: Lecythidaceae
- Subfamily: Lecythidoideae
- Genus: Eschweilera; Mart. ex DC.

Type species
- Eschweilera parvifolia Mart. ex DC.

Synonyms
- Jugastrum Miers; Neohuberia Ledoux; Noallia Buc'hoz

= Eschweilera =

Genus of flowering plants

Eschweilera is a genus of woody plants in the family Lecythidaceae first described as a genus in 1828. It is native to southern Mexico, Central America, South America, and Trinidad.

A phylogenetic study published in 2024 by Vargas et al. concluded that Eschweilera was polyphyletic. The authors proposed leaving the core Parvifolia clade in Eschweilera, and placing the Tetrapetala section of Lecythis in the new genus Imbiriba, the Integrifolia clade in the new genus Scottmoria, and Eschweilera amazoniciformis, an isolated sister lineage to Corythophora and Imbiriba, in the new monotypic genus Waimiria.

== Species ==
71 species are accepted.

- Eschweilera alata A.C.Sm. - Venezuela, Guyana
- Eschweilera albiflora (DC.) Miers - Colombia, Peru, Bolivia, Brazil
- Eschweilera amazonica R.Knuth - Brazil
- Eschweilera apiculata (Miers) A.C.Sm. - Brazil, French Guiana
- Eschweilera atropetiolata S.A.Mori - Brazil
- Eschweilera baguensis S.A.Mori - Ecuador, Peru
- Eschweilera beebei Pittier ex S.A.Mori - Aragua
- Eschweilera biflava S.A.Mori - Costa Rica
- Eschweilera bogotensis R.Knuth - Colombia
- Eschweilera boltenii S.A.Mori - Suriname
- Eschweilera bracteosa (Poepp. ex O.Berg) Miers - Venezuela, Brazil, Peru
- Eschweilera cabrerana Philipson - Colombia
- Eschweilera carinata S.A.Mori - Brazil
- Eschweilera chartaceifolia S.A.Mori - Brazil, Peru
- Eschweilera collina Eyma - Venezuela, Brazil, the Guianas
- Eschweilera coriacea (DC.) S.A.Mori - Honduras to Bolivia
- Eschweilera correae J.E.Bat. & S.A.Mori – Costa Rica, Panama
- Eschweilera costaricensis S.A.Mori - Costa Rica, Nicaragua
- Eschweilera cyathiformis S.A.Mori - Brazil
- Eschweilera decolorans Sandwith - Trinidad, South America
- Eschweilera donosoensis J.E.Bat. & S.A.Mori – Panama
- Eschweilera eperuetorum Sandwith - Guyana
- Eschweilera fanshawei Sandwith - Guyana
- Eschweilera foetulenta S.A.Mori & J.E.Bat. – Panama
- Eschweilera gigantea (R.Knuth) J.F.Macbr. – Colombia, Ecuador, Peru
- Eschweilera grandiflora (Aubl.) Sandwith - Brazil, Peru, Fr Guiana
- Eschweilera harmonii S.A.Mori - Costa Rica
- Eschweilera integricalyx S.A.Mori - Colombia
- Eschweilera itayensis R.Knuth - Colombia, Peru, Brazil
- Eschweilera juruensis R.Knuth - Colombia, Peru, Brazil
- Eschweilera klugii R.Knuth - Loreto
- Eschweilera laevicarpa S.A.Mori - Peru, Brazil, Venezuela, Fr Guiana
- Eschweilera longipedicellata S.A.Mori - Panama, Colombia
- Eschweilera macrocarpa Pittier - Venezuela
- Eschweilera magnifica J.E.Bat. & S.A.Mori – Panama
- Eschweilera mexicana T.Wendt, S.A.Mori & Prance - Oaxaca, Veracruz
- Eschweilera micrantha (O.Berg) Miers - Brazil, Venezuela, the Guianas
- Eschweilera microcalyx S.A.Mori - Colombia
- Eschweilera neblinensis S.A.Mori - V Amazonas
- Eschweilera neei S.A.Mori - Panama, Colombia
- Eschweilera obversa (O.Berg) Miers - Pará, Maranhão
- Eschweilera ovata (Cambess.) Mart. ex Miers - Brazil
- Eschweilera paniculata (O.Berg) Miers - Colombia, Venezuela
- Eschweilera parviflora (Aubl.) Miers - Brazil, the Guianas, Venezuela
- Eschweilera parvifolia Mart. ex DC. - N South America
- Eschweilera pedicellata (Rich.) S.A.Mori - Brazil, the Guianas, Venezuela
- Eschweilera perumbonata Pittier - Venezuela
- Eschweilera piresii S.A.Mori - French Guiana, Pará
- Eschweilera potaroensis Sandwith - Guyana
- Eschweilera praealta (Sprague) Sandwith - Colombia
- Eschweilera pseudodecolorans S.A.Mori - Amazonas
- Eschweilera punctata S.A.Mori - Colombia, Brazil
- Eschweilera rabeliana S.A.Mori - Amapá
- Eschweilera rankiniae S.A.Mori - Amazonas
- Eschweilera reversa Pittier - Costa Rica, Panama, Colombia, Ecuador
- Eschweilera revoluta S.A.Mori - V Amazonas
- Eschweilera rhododendrifolia (R.Knuth) A.C.Sm. - Brazil
- Eschweilera rionegrense S.A.Mori - Brazil, Venezuela
- Eschweilera rodriguesiana S.A.Mori - Brazil
- Eschweilera roraimensis S.A.Mori - Brazil, Venezuela
- Eschweilera rufifolia S.A.Mori - Loreto
- Eschweilera sagotiana Miers - Brazil, the Guianas, Venezuela
- Eschweilera squamata S.A.Mori - French Guiana
- Eschweilera subcordata S.A.Mori - Pará
- Eschweilera subglandulosa (Steud. ex O.Berg) Miers - Brazil, the Guianas, Venezuela, Trinidad
- Eschweilera tenax (Steud. ex O.Berg) Miers - Venezuela, Trinidad
- Eschweilera tenuifolia (O.Berg) Miers - Brazil, Venezuela
- Eschweilera tessmannii R.Knuth - Brazil, Peru
- Eschweilera truncata R.Knuth - Brazil
- Eschweilera venezuelica S.A.Mori - Venezuela
- Eschweilera wachenheimii (Benoist) Sandwith - Brazil, the Guianas

=== Formerly placed here ===
- Chytroma congestiflora (Benoist) R.Knuth (as E. congestiflora (Benoist) Eyma)
- Chytroma simiorum (Benoist) R.Knuth (as E. simiorum (Benoist) Eyma)
- Imbiriba alvimii (S.A.Mori) O.M.Vargas, M.Ribeiro & C.W.Dick (as E. alvimii S.A.Mori)
- Imbiriba complanata (S.A.Mori) O.M.Vargas, M.Ribeiro & C.W.Dick (as E. complanata S.A.Mori)
- Imbiriba compressa (Vell.) O.M.Vargas, M.Ribeiro & C.W.Dick (as E. compressa (Vell.) Miers)
- Imbiriba mattos-silvae (S.A.Mori) O.M.Vargas, M.Ribeiro & C.W.Dick (as E. mattos-silvae S.A.Mori)
- Imbiriba nana (O.Berg) O.M.Vargas, M.Ribeiro & C.W.Dick (as E. nana (O.Berg) Miers)
- Imbiriba tetrapetala (S.A.Mori) O.M.Vargas, M.Ribeiro & C.W.Dick (as E. tetrapetala S.A.Mori)
- Scottmoria aguilarii (S.A.Mori) Cornejo (as E. aguilarii S.A.Mori)
- Scottmoria amplexifolia (S.A.Mori) Cornejo (as E. amplexifolia S.A.Mori)
- Scottmoria andina (Rusby) Cornejo (as E. andina (Rusby) J.F.Macbr.)
- Scottmoria antioquensis (Dugand & H.Daniel) Cornejo (as E. antioquensis Dugand & H.Daniel)
- Scottmoria awaensis (S.A.Mori & Cornejo) Cornejo (as E. awaensis S.A.Mori & Cornejo)
- Scottmoria calyculata (Pittier) Cornejo (as E. calyculata Pittier)
- Scottmoria caudiculata (R.Knuth) Cornejo (as E. caudiculata R.Knuth)
- Scottmoria collinsii (Pittier) Cornejo (as E. collinsii Pittier)
- Scottmoria hondurensis (Standl.) Cornejo (as E. hondurensis Standl.)
- Scottmoria integrifolia (Ruiz & Pav. ex Miers) Cornejo (as E. integrifolia (Ruiz & Pav. ex Miers) R.Knuth)
- Scottmoria jacquelyniae (S.A.Mori) Cornejo (as E. jacquelyniae S.A.Mori)
- Scottmoria rimbachii (Standl.) Cornejo (as E. rimbachii Standl.)
- Scottmoria ovalifolia (DC.) Cornejo (as E. ovalifolia (DC.) Nied.)
- Scottmoria pachyderma (Cuatrec.) Cornejo (as E. pachyderma Cuatrec.)
- Scottmoria panamensis (Pittier) Cornejo (as E. panamensis Pittier)
- Scottmoria sclerophylla (Cuatrec.) Cornejo (as E. sclerophylla Cuatrec.)
- Scottmoria sessilis (A.C.Sm.) Cornejo (as E. sessilis A.C.Sm.)
- Waimiria amazoniciformis (S.A.Mori) C.W.Dick & O.M.Vargas (as E. amazoniciformis S.A.Mori)
