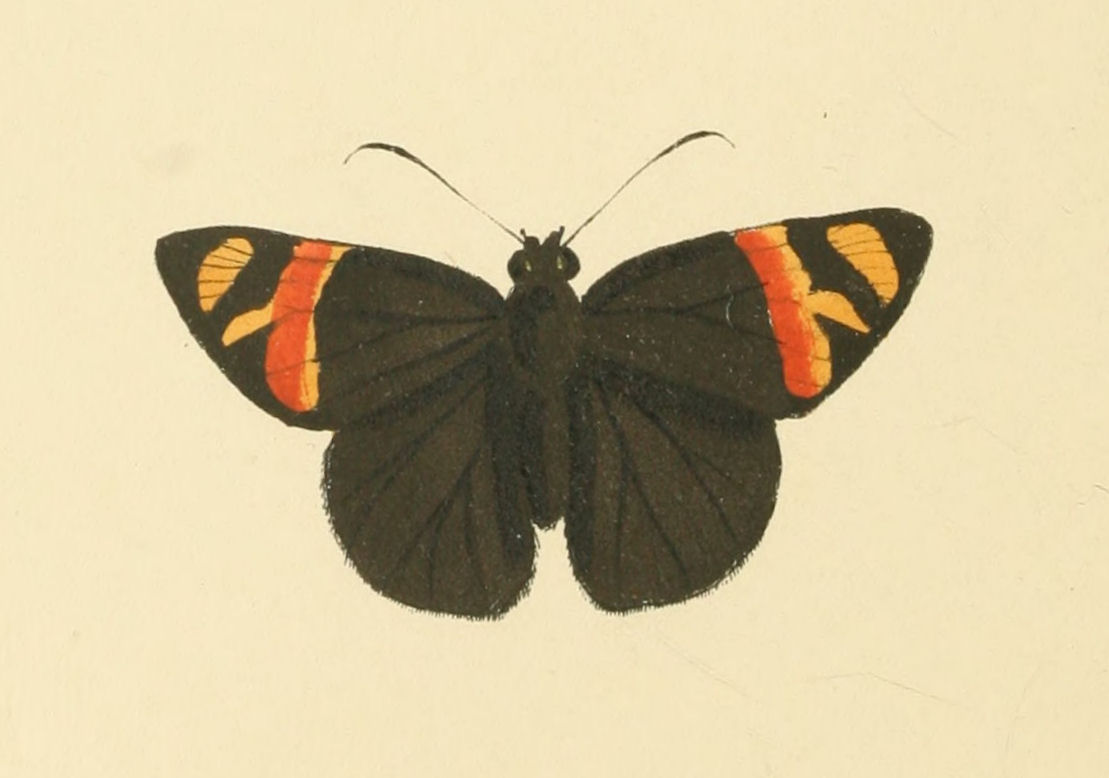

Scientific classification
- Kingdom: Animalia
- Phylum: Arthropoda
- Class: Insecta
- Order: Lepidoptera
- Family: Hesperiidae
- Genus: Entheus
- Species: E. priassus

Binomial name
- Entheus priassus (Linnaeus, 1758)

Synonyms
- List: Papilio priassus Linnaeus, 1758; Papilio talaus Linnaeus, 1763; Papilio peleus Linnaeus, 1763; Peleus aeacus (Swainson, 1831); Phareas serenus (Plötz, 1883); Entheus cramerianus Mabille, 1898

= Entheus priassus =

Species of butterfly

Entheus priassus is a species of skipper butterfly, family Hesperiidae. It is found in Panama and in South America (Brazil, Surinam, and French Guiana). It is a herbivore on the leaves of Gustavia superba, Gustavia ruiziana, and Lecythis (all in Lecythidaceae).

== Subspecies ==
There are two subspecies:

- Entheus priassus priassus (Surinam, French Guiana)
- Entheus priassus pralina Evans, 1952 (Brazil (Espírito Santo))
