= Carmenta foraseminis =

Scientific classification
- Kingdom: Animalia
- Phylum: Arthropoda
- Clade: Pancrustacea
- Class: Insecta
- Order: Lepidoptera
- Family: Sesiidae
- Genus: Carmenta
- Species: C. foraseminis

Binomial name
- Carmenta foraseminis Eichlin, 1995

Species of moth

Carmenta foraseminis is a moth of the family Sesiidae. It was described by Thomas Drake Eichlin in 1995, and is known from Panama, Colombia, Venezuela, and Brazil. The larva of the species have been found on plants of the species Gustavia angustifolia, Gustavia superba, as well as plants in the genus Eschweilera, and on the pods of Theobroma cacao.
