= Waimiria =

Conservation status
- Vulnerable (IUCN 3.1)

Scientific classification
- Kingdom: Plantae
- Clade: Tracheophytes
- Clade: Angiosperms
- Clade: Eudicots
- Clade: Asterids
- Order: Ericales
- Family: Lecythidaceae
- Genus: Waimiria; C.W.Dick & O.M.Vargas
- Species: W. amazoniciformis

Binomial name
- Waimiria amazoniciformis (S.A.Mori) C.W.Dick & O.M.Vargas

Synonyms
- Eschweilera amazoniciformis S.A.Mori

Genus of flowering plants

Waimiria is a genus of flowering plants in the family Lecythidaceae. It includes a single species, Waimiria amazoniciformis, a tree endemic to northern Brazil, where it grows in terre firme Amazon rainforest around Manaus.

The species was first described as Eschweilera amazoniciformis by Scott Alan Mori in 1990. A phylogenetic study by Vargas et al. published in 2024 concluded that Eschweilera was polyphyletic, and that E. amazoniciformis was an isolated sister lineage most closely related to the genera Corythophora and Imbiriba. The authors placed it in the new monotypic genus Waimiria as Waimiria amazoniciformis.
