= Eschweilera atropetiolata =

Conservation status
- Least Concern (IUCN 3.1)

Scientific classification
- Kingdom: Plantae
- Clade: Tracheophytes
- Clade: Angiosperms
- Clade: Eudicots
- Clade: Asterids
- Order: Ericales
- Family: Lecythidaceae
- Genus: Eschweilera
- Species: E. atropetiolata

Binomial name
- Eschweilera atropetiolata S.A.Mori

Species of flowering plant

Eschweilera atropetiolata is a species of woody plant in the family Lecythidaceae. It is found only in northern Brazil. It is threatened by habitat loss.
