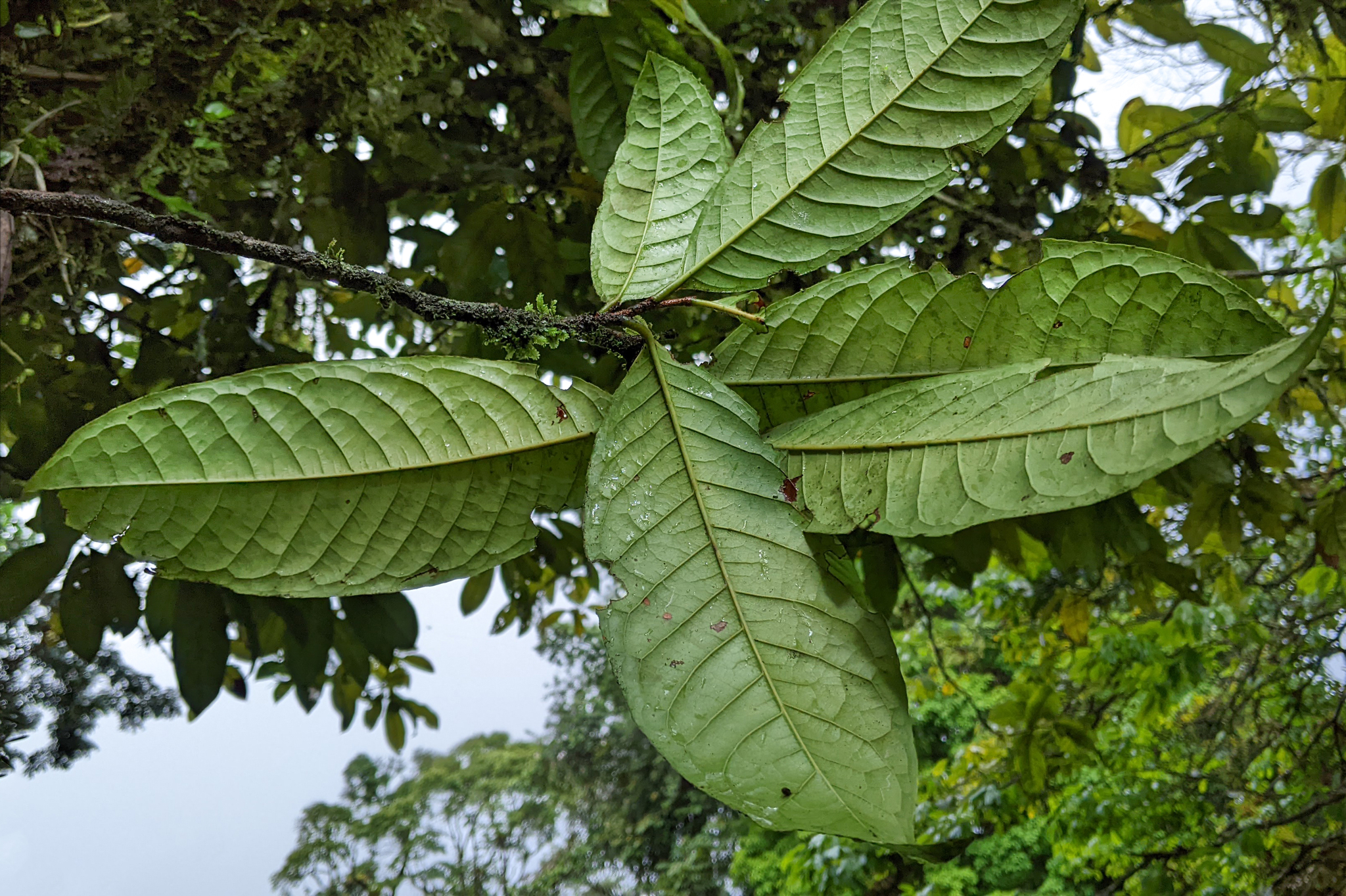

Conservation status
- Vulnerable (IUCN 2.3)

Scientific classification
- Kingdom: Plantae
- Clade: Tracheophytes
- Clade: Angiosperms
- Clade: Eudicots
- Clade: Asterids
- Order: Ericales
- Family: Lecythidaceae
- Genus: Corythophora
- Species: C. labriculata

Binomial name
- Corythophora labriculata (Eyma) S.A.Mori & Prance

Synonyms
- Chytroma labriculata (Eyma) R.Knuth; Eschweilera labriculata Eyma

= Corythophora labriculata =

Species of flowering plant

Corythophora labriculata is a species of woody plant in the family Lecythidaceae. It is found only in Suriname.
