= Gustavia petiolata =

Conservation status
- Least Concern (IUCN 3.1)

Scientific classification
- Kingdom: Plantae
- Clade: Tracheophytes
- Clade: Angiosperms
- Clade: Eudicots
- Clade: Asterids
- Order: Ericales
- Family: Lecythidaceae
- Genus: Gustavia
- Species: G. petiolata

Binomial name
- Gustavia petiolata S.A.Mori

Species of flowering plant

Gustavia petiolata is a species of woody plant in the family Lecythidaceae. It is a tree found only in western Colombia.
