= Membrillo =

Membrillo is a Spanish language common name for several species of plants:

- Gustavia fosteri, a species of woody plant in the family Lecythidaceae
- Gustavia superba, another species in the genus Gustavia
- Quince fruit
- Dulce de membrillo, quince paste
