= Gustavia dodsonii =

Conservation status
- Endangered (IUCN 3.1)

Scientific classification
- Kingdom: Plantae
- Clade: Tracheophytes
- Clade: Angiosperms
- Clade: Eudicots
- Clade: Asterids
- Order: Ericales
- Family: Lecythidaceae
- Genus: Gustavia
- Species: G. dodsonii

Binomial name
- Gustavia dodsonii S.A.Mori

Species of flowering plant

Gustavia dodsonii is a species of woody plant in the Monkeypot Family (Lecythidaceae). It is a tree endemic to northwestern Ecuador. Its natural habitats are subtropical or tropical moist lowland forests and subtropical or tropical moist montane forests. Its most remarkable feature are its seeds, which can measure up to 2.9 inches (74 mm) in length by up to 2.25 inches (58mm) in diameter.
