= Eschweilera coriacea =

Conservation status
- Least Concern (IUCN 3.1)

Scientific classification
- Kingdom: Plantae
- Clade: Tracheophytes
- Clade: Angiosperms
- Clade: Eudicots
- Clade: Asterids
- Order: Ericales
- Family: Lecythidaceae
- Genus: Eschweilera
- Species: E. coriacea

Binomial name
- Eschweilera coriacea (DC.) S.A. Mori

Synonyms
- Lecythis coriacea DC.; Eschweilera grandifolia Mart. ex DC.; Eschweilera eymaana R.Knuth; Eschweilera fractiflexa R.Knuth; Eschweilera retroflexa (Benoist) R.Knuth; Eschweilera vageleri R.Knuth; Lecythis acuminatissima O.Berg; Lecythis grandifolia (Mart. ex DC.) O.Berg; Lecythis odora Poepp. ex O.Berg; Chytroma cincturata Miers; Chytroma grandifolia (Mart. ex DC.) Miers; Eschweilera acuminatissima (O.Berg) Miers; Eschweilera odora (Poepp. ex O.Berg) Miers; Eschweilera pallida Miers; Jugastrum coriaceum (DC.) Miers; Eschweilera matamata Huber; Lecythis retroflexa Benoist; Neohuberia matamata Ledoux; Lecythis peruviana L.O.Williams

Species of tree

Eschweilera coriacea (Portuguese: matamatá) is a species of tree in the family Lecythidaceae. It is native to Honduras, Panama and South America.
