= Gustavia serrata =

Conservation status
- Endangered (IUCN 3.1)

Scientific classification
- Kingdom: Plantae
- Clade: Tracheophytes
- Clade: Angiosperms
- Clade: Eudicots
- Clade: Asterids
- Order: Ericales
- Family: Lecythidaceae
- Genus: Gustavia
- Species: G. serrata

Binomial name
- Gustavia serrata S.A.Mori

Species of flowering plant

Gustavia serrata is a species of woody plant in the family Lecythidaceae. It is a tree endemic to Ecuador. Its natural habitat is subtropical or tropical moist lowland forests up to 500 metres elevation.
