= Gustavia verticillata =

Conservation status
- Least Concern (IUCN 3.1)

Scientific classification
- Kingdom: Plantae
- Clade: Tracheophytes
- Clade: Angiosperms
- Clade: Eudicots
- Clade: Asterids
- Order: Ericales
- Family: Lecythidaceae
- Genus: Gustavia
- Species: G. verticillata

Binomial name
- Gustavia verticillata Miers

Species of flowering plant

Gustavia verticillata is a species of woody plant in the family Lecythidaceae.

== Distribution and habitat ==
It is native to Colombia, and Panamá. It is found in dry forests, lowland humid forests, and highland humid forests.
