= Brazzeia longipedicellata =

Conservation status
- Vulnerable (IUCN 3.1)

Scientific classification
- Kingdom: Plantae
- Clade: Tracheophytes
- Clade: Angiosperms
- Clade: Eudicots
- Clade: Asterids
- Order: Ericales
- Family: Lecythidaceae
- Genus: Brazzeia
- Species: B. longipedicellata

Binomial name
- Brazzeia longipedicellata Verdc.

Species of flowering plant

Brazzeia longipedicellata is a species of plant in the family Lecythidaceae. It is found in the Democratic Republic of the Congo and Uganda. It is found between 800 and 1,500 metres (2,600 and 4,900 ft) in tropical moist forests, including evergreen and semi-deciduous forests.
