= Scottmoria amplexifolia =

Conservation status
- Least Concern (IUCN 3.1)

Scientific classification
- Kingdom: Plantae
- Clade: Tracheophytes
- Clade: Angiosperms
- Clade: Eudicots
- Clade: Asterids
- Order: Ericales
- Family: Lecythidaceae
- Genus: Scottmoria
- Species: S. amplexifolia

Binomial name
- Scottmoria amplexifolia (S.A.Mori) Cornejo

Synonyms
- Eschweilera amplexifolia S.A.Mori

Species of flowering plant

Scottmoria amplexifolia is a species of flowering plant in the family Lecythidaceae. It is a tree native to Costa Rica, Panama, and Colombia. It grows in lowland and montane rain forest from 20 to 1,339 meters elevation.

The species was first described as Eschweilera amplexifolia by Scott Alan Mori in 1990. In 2024 Xavier Cornejo placed the species in the newly-described genus Scottmoria as S. amplexifolia.
