= Eschweilera reversa =

Conservation status
- Least Concern (IUCN 3.1)

Scientific classification
- Kingdom: Plantae
- Clade: Tracheophytes
- Clade: Angiosperms
- Clade: Eudicots
- Clade: Asterids
- Order: Ericales
- Family: Lecythidaceae
- Genus: Eschweilera
- Species: E. reversa

Binomial name
- Eschweilera reversa Pittier

Synonyms
- Eschweilera pittieri R.Knuth; Eschweilera verruculosa Pittier

Species of flowering plant

Eschweilera reversa, synonym Eschweilera pittieri, is a species of flowering plant in the Lecythidaceae family. It is a tree native to Colombia, Costa Rica, Ecuador, and Panama.
