= Imbiriba tetrapetala =

Conservation status
- Endangered (IUCN 3.1)

Scientific classification
- Kingdom: Plantae
- Clade: Tracheophytes
- Clade: Angiosperms
- Clade: Eudicots
- Clade: Asterids
- Order: Ericales
- Family: Lecythidaceae
- Genus: Imbiriba
- Species: I. tetrapetala

Binomial name
- Imbiriba tetrapetala (S.A.Mori) O.M.Vargas, M.Ribeiro & C.W.Dick

Synonyms
- Eschweilera tetrapetala S.A.Mori

Species of flowering plant

Imbiriba tetrapetala is a species of flowering plant in the family Lecythidaceae. It is a tree endemic to southeastern Bahia state in northeastern Brazil. It grows in the Atlantic dry forests and seasonally-dry Bahia interior forests, which are part of the Atlantic Forest complex of eastern Brazil. It is threatened by habitat loss.

The species was first described as Eschweilera tetrapetala by Scott Alan Mori in 1981. In 2024 Oscar Mauricio Vargas, Michel Ribeiro, and Christopher W. Dick placed the species in the newly described genus Imbiriba as I. tetrapetala.
