= Eschweilera rodriguesiana =

Conservation status
- Vulnerable (IUCN 2.3)

Scientific classification
- Kingdom: Plantae
- Clade: Tracheophytes
- Clade: Angiosperms
- Clade: Eudicots
- Clade: Asterids
- Order: Ericales
- Family: Lecythidaceae
- Genus: Eschweilera
- Species: E. rodriguesiana

Binomial name
- Eschweilera rodriguesiana Mori

Species of flowering plant

Eschweilera rodriguesiana is a species of woody plant in the family Lecythidaceae. It is found only in Brazil. It is threatened by habitat loss.
