= Eschweilera rhododendrifolia =

Conservation status
- Vulnerable (IUCN 2.3)

Scientific classification
- Kingdom: Plantae
- Clade: Tracheophytes
- Clade: Angiosperms
- Clade: Eudicots
- Clade: Asterids
- Order: Ericales
- Family: Lecythidaceae
- Genus: Eschweilera
- Species: E. rhododendrifolia

Binomial name
- Eschweilera rhododendrifolia (R. Knuth) A. C. Smith

Species of flowering plant

Eschweilera rhododendrifolia is a species of woody plant in the family Lecythidaceae. It is found only in Brazil. It is threatened by habitat loss.
