= Eschweilera baguensis =

Conservation status
- Vulnerable (IUCN 2.3)

Scientific classification
- Kingdom: Plantae
- Clade: Tracheophytes
- Clade: Angiosperms
- Clade: Eudicots
- Clade: Asterids
- Order: Ericales
- Family: Lecythidaceae
- Genus: Eschweilera
- Species: E. baguensis

Binomial name
- Eschweilera baguensis S.A.Mori

Species of tree

Eschweilera baguensis is a species of tree in the family Lecythidaceae. It is found in Ecuador and Peru and is considered a vulnerable species by the IUCN.
