= Gustavia erythrocarpa =

Conservation status
- Vulnerable (IUCN 2.3)

Scientific classification
- Kingdom: Plantae
- Clade: Tracheophytes
- Clade: Angiosperms
- Clade: Eudicots
- Clade: Asterids
- Order: Ericales
- Family: Lecythidaceae
- Genus: Gustavia
- Species: G. erythrocarpa

Binomial name
- Gustavia erythrocarpa Mori

Species of flowering plant

Gustavia erythrocarpa is a species of woody plant in the family Lecythidaceae. It is found only in Brazil. It is threatened by habitat loss.
