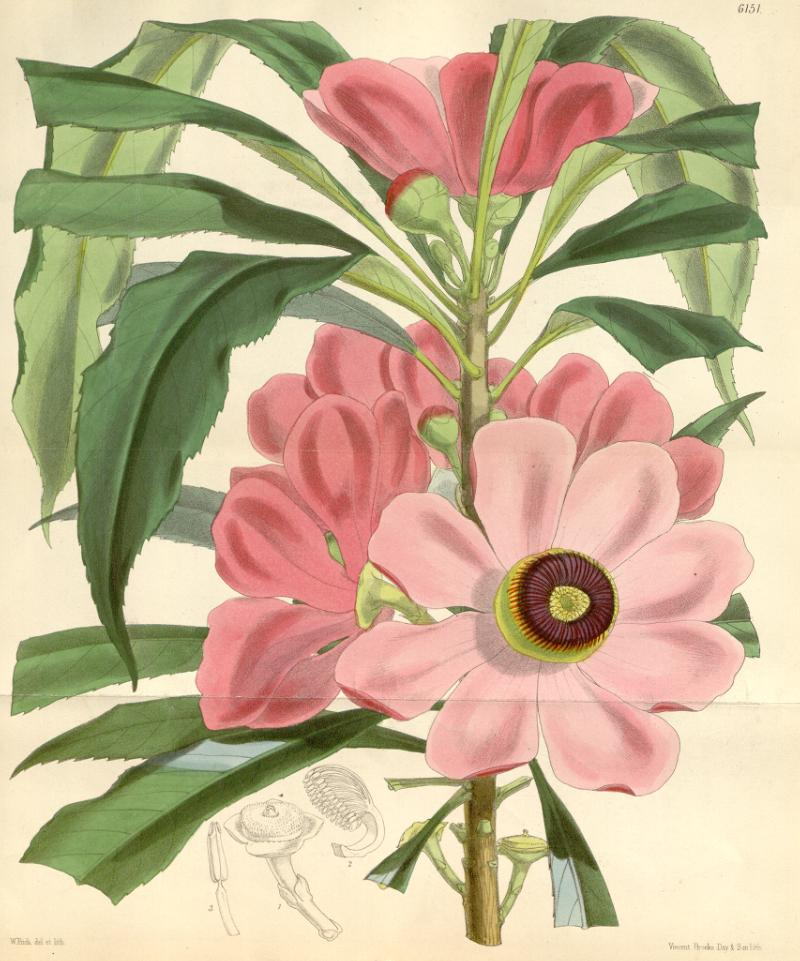

Conservation status
- Vulnerable (IUCN 3.1)

Scientific classification
- Kingdom: Plantae
- Clade: Tracheophytes
- Clade: Angiosperms
- Clade: Eudicots
- Clade: Asterids
- Order: Ericales
- Family: Lecythidaceae
- Genus: Gustavia
- Species: G. gracillima

Binomial name
- Gustavia gracillima Miers

Synonyms
- Homotypic Synonyms: Japarandiba gracillima (Miers) Nied.

= Gustavia gracillima =

Species of flowering plant

Gustavia gracillima is a species of woody plant in the family Lecythidaceae. It is endemic to Colombia.
