= Eschweilera subcordata =

Conservation status
- Critically Endangered (IUCN 3.1)

Scientific classification
- Kingdom: Plantae
- Clade: Tracheophytes
- Clade: Angiosperms
- Clade: Eudicots
- Clade: Asterids
- Order: Ericales
- Family: Lecythidaceae
- Genus: Eschweilera
- Species: E. subcordata

Binomial name
- Eschweilera subcordata Mori

Species of flowering plant

Eschweilera subcordata is a species of woody plant in the family Lecythidaceae. It is found only in Brazil. It is threatened by habitat loss.
