= Gustavia excelsa =

Conservation status
- Vulnerable (IUCN 3.1)

Scientific classification
- Kingdom: Plantae
- Clade: Tracheophytes
- Clade: Angiosperms
- Clade: Eudicots
- Clade: Asterids
- Order: Ericales
- Family: Lecythidaceae
- Genus: Gustavia
- Species: G. excelsa

Binomial name
- Gustavia excelsa R.Knuth

Species of flowering plant

Gustavia excelsa is a species of woody plant in the family Lecythidaceae. It is a tree found only in Colombia.
