= Gustavia fosteri =

Conservation status
- Vulnerable (IUCN 2.3)

Scientific classification
- Kingdom: Plantae
- Clade: Tracheophytes
- Clade: Angiosperms
- Clade: Eudicots
- Clade: Asterids
- Order: Ericales
- Family: Lecythidaceae
- Genus: Gustavia
- Species: G. fosteri

Binomial name
- Gustavia fosteri Mori

Species of flowering plant

Gustavia fosteri, one of several plants in the genus Gustavia known by the Spanish common name membrillo, is a species of woody plant in the family Lecythidaceae. It is found only on Barro Colorado Island in Panama. It is threatened by habitat loss.

Gustavia fosteri is distinguished from the more abundant Gustavia superba by several features, including smaller leaves; mostly terminal inflorescences; a calyx comprising four lobes whilst that of Gustavia superba is entire; petals coloured pink throughout rather than white flushed pink; white rather than orange mesocarp "flesh" in the fruit.
