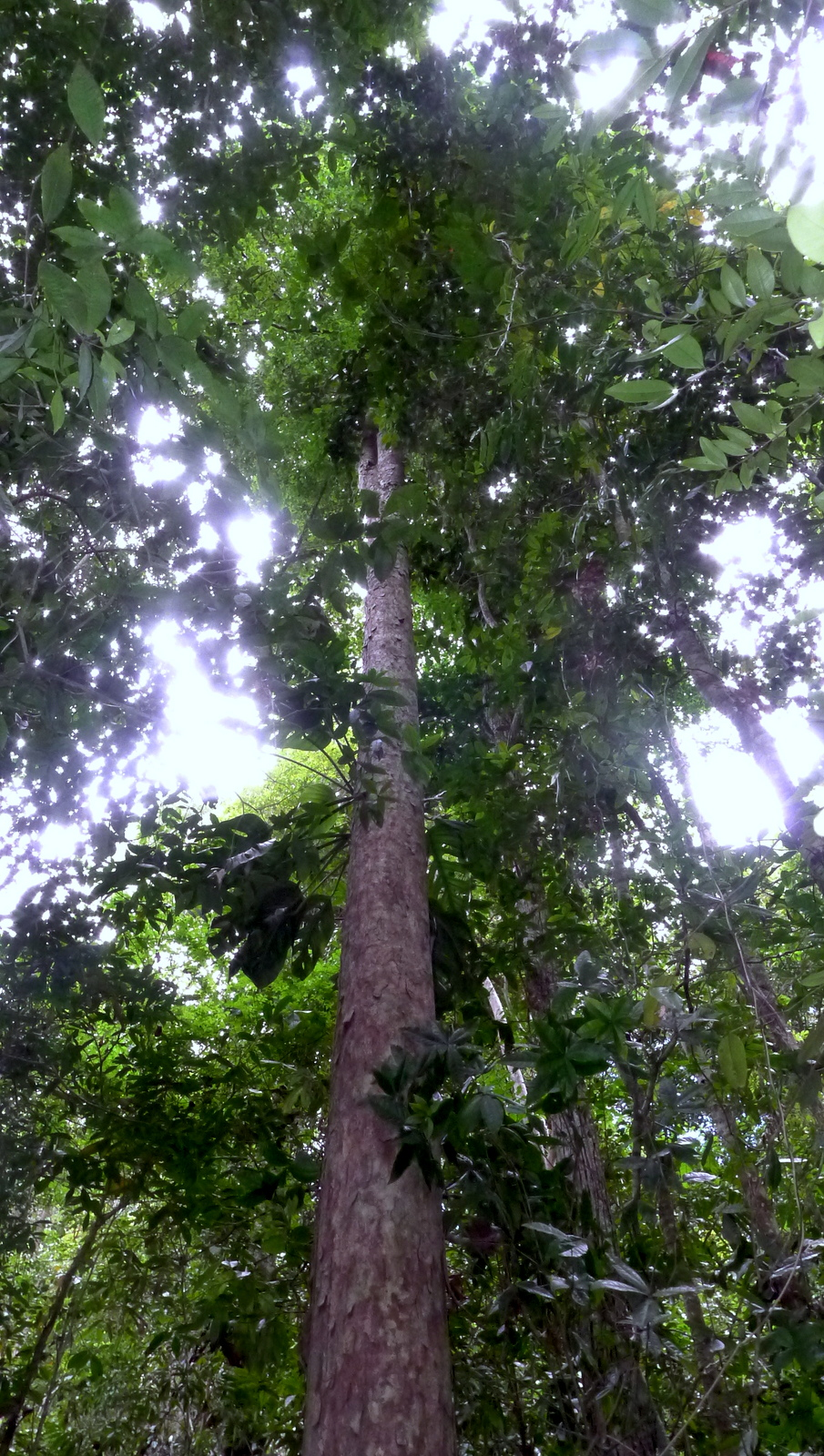

Conservation status
- Vulnerable (IUCN 2.3)

Scientific classification
- Kingdom: Plantae
- Clade: Tracheophytes
- Clade: Angiosperms
- Clade: Eudicots
- Clade: Asterids
- Order: Ericales
- Family: Lecythidaceae
- Genus: Imbiriba
- Species: I. alvimii

Binomial name
- Imbiriba alvimii (S.A.Mori) O.M.Vargas, M.Ribeiro & C.W.Dick

Synonyms
- Eschweilera alvimii S.A.Mori

= Imbiriba alvimii =

Species of flowering plant

Imbiriba alvimii is a species of flowering plant in the family Lecythidaceae. It is a tree endemic to Bahia state in northeastern Brazil, where it grows in moist Atlantic Forest. It is threatened by habitat loss.

The species was first described as Eschweilera alvimii by Scott Alan Mori in 1981. In 2024 Oscar Mauricio Vargas, Michel Ribeiro, and Christopher W. Dick placed the species in the newly-described genus Imbiriba as I. alvimii.
