= Scottmoria integrifolia =

Conservation status
- Least Concern (IUCN 3.1)

Scientific classification
- Kingdom: Plantae
- Clade: Tracheophytes
- Clade: Angiosperms
- Clade: Eudicots
- Clade: Asterids
- Order: Ericales
- Family: Lecythidaceae
- Genus: Scottmoria
- Species: S. integrifolia

Binomial name
- Scottmoria integrifolia (Ruiz & Pav. ex Miers) Cornejo

Synonyms
- Homotypic Synonyms: Eschweilera integrifolia (Ruiz & Pav. ex Miers) R.Knuth; Lecythis integrifolia Ruiz & Pav. ex Miers; Heterotypic Synonyms: Eschweilera woodsoniana Dwyer; Lecythis subbiflora Ruiz & Pav.

Species of flowering plant

Scottmoria integrifolia is a species of woody plant in the family Lecythidaceae. It is a tree native to Colombia, Costa Rica, Ecuador, and Panama.

The species was first described as Lecythis integrifolia by John Miers in 1874. In 1939 Reinhard Gustav Paul Knuth placed the species in genus Eschweilera as Eschweilera integrifolia. In 2024 Xavier Cornejo placed the species in the newly described genus Scottmoria as S. integrifolia.
