= Scottmoria jacquelyniae =

Conservation status
- Least Concern (IUCN 3.1)

Scientific classification
- Kingdom: Plantae
- Clade: Tracheophytes
- Clade: Angiosperms
- Clade: Eudicots
- Clade: Asterids
- Order: Ericales
- Family: Lecythidaceae
- Genus: Scottmoria
- Species: S. jacquelyniae

Binomial name
- Scottmoria jacquelyniae (S.A.Mori) Cornejo

Synonyms
- Eschweilera jacquelyniae S.A.Mori

Species of flowering plant

Scottmoria jacquelyniae is a species of flowering plant in the family Lecythidaceae. It is a tree native to Colombia and Panama. It grows in lowland and montane rain forest in central and eastern Panama and northwestern Colombia, including Altos de Campana National Park and Darién National Park in Panama and north of Utria National Park in Colombia. It is threatened by habitat loss.

The species was first described as Eschweilera jacquelyniae by Scott Alan Mori in 1990. In 2024 Xavier Cornejo placed the species in the newly-described genus Scottmoria as S. jacquelyniae.
