= Eschweilera potaroensis =

Conservation status
- Endangered (IUCN 3.1)

Scientific classification
- Kingdom: Plantae
- Clade: Embryophytes
- Clade: Tracheophytes
- Clade: Spermatophytes
- Clade: Angiosperms
- Clade: Eudicots
- Clade: Asterids
- Order: Ericales
- Family: Lecythidaceae
- Genus: Eschweilera
- Species: E. potaroensis

Binomial name
- Eschweilera potaroensis Sandwith

Species of flowering plant

Eschweilera potaroensis is a species of woody plant in the family Lecythidaceae. It is found only in Guyana.
