= Eschweilera roraimensis =

Conservation status
- Vulnerable (IUCN 2.3)

Scientific classification
- Kingdom: Plantae
- Clade: Tracheophytes
- Clade: Angiosperms
- Clade: Eudicots
- Clade: Asterids
- Order: Ericales
- Family: Lecythidaceae
- Genus: Eschweilera
- Species: E. roraimensis

Binomial name
- Eschweilera roraimensis Mori

Species of flowering plant

Eschweilera roraimensis is a species of woody plant in the family Lecythidaceae. It is found in Brazil and Venezuela. It is a canopy tree, found in cloud forest in the Sierra Parima between 700 and 1,500 meters elevation. It is threatened by habitat loss.
