= Gustavia romeroi =

Scientific classification
- Kingdom: Plantae
- Clade: Tracheophytes
- Clade: Angiosperms
- Clade: Eudicots
- Clade: Asterids
- Order: Ericales
- Family: Lecythidaceae
- Genus: Gustavia
- Species: G. romeroi

Binomial name
- Gustavia romeroi S.A.Mori & García-Barr.

Species of plant

Gustavia romeroi (common name coco hediondo) is a rainforest tree native to the Magdalena River Basin of Colombia. It belongs to the family Lecythidaceae. The flowers have as many as eighteen petals.
