= Gustavia sessilis =

Conservation status
- Least Concern (IUCN 3.1)

Scientific classification
- Kingdom: Plantae
- Clade: Tracheophytes
- Clade: Angiosperms
- Clade: Eudicots
- Clade: Asterids
- Order: Ericales
- Family: Lecythidaceae
- Genus: Gustavia
- Species: G. sessilis

Binomial name
- Gustavia sessilis Mori

Species of flowering plant

Gustavia sessilis is a species of woody plant in the family Lecythidaceae. It is found only in Colombia.
