= Eschweilera obversa =

Conservation status
- Least Concern (IUCN 3.1)

Scientific classification
- Kingdom: Plantae
- Clade: Tracheophytes
- Clade: Angiosperms
- Clade: Eudicots
- Clade: Asterids
- Order: Ericales
- Family: Lecythidaceae
- Genus: Eschweilera
- Species: E. obversa

Binomial name
- Eschweilera obversa (O.Berg) Miers

Synonyms
- Eschweilera obidosensis R.Knuth; Lecythis obversa O.Berg

Species of flowering plant

Eschweilera obversa is a species of flowering plant in the family Lecythidaceae. It is a tree endemic to the Amazon region (Pará and Maranhão) in northern Brazil. It is threatened by habitat loss.
