= Cajita =

Cajita may refer to:

- Eschweilera mexicana, a species of woody plant only found in Mexico
- Cajita (instrument), a Latin percussion instrument in which a little box is opened and closed
- A subset of the JavaScript programming language based on the principles of object-capabilities, see Caja project
