= Scottmoria =

Scientific classification
- Kingdom: Plantae
- Clade: Tracheophytes
- Clade: Angiosperms
- Clade: Eudicots
- Clade: Asterids
- Order: Ericales
- Family: Lecythidaceae
- Subfamily: Lecythidoideae
- Genus: Scottmoria; Cornejo

Genus of flowering plants

Scottmoria is a genus of flowering plants in the family Lecythidaceae. It includes 26 species native tropical Central and South America, ranging from Honduras to Colombia, Venezuela, northern Brazil, Ecuador, Peru, and Bolivia.

The genus was described in 2024 by Xavier Cornejo, who named it in honor of American botanist Scott Alan Mori (1941–2020), an authority in the neotropical Lecythidaceae. The species in Scottmoria constitute the former Integrifolia clade of genus Eschweilera. Vargas et al. published a phylogenetic study in 2024 which concluded that Eschweilera was polyphyletic, and the authors proposed new or revived genera, including Scottmoria, for species in the paraphyletic sections of Eschweilera.

== Species ==
26 species are accepted.

- Scottmoria aguilarii (S.A.Mori) Cornejo
- Scottmoria albomarginata Cornejo
- Scottmoria amplexifolia (S.A.Mori) Cornejo
- Scottmoria andina (Rusby) Cornejo
- Scottmoria antioquensis (Dugand & H.Daniel) Cornejo
- Scottmoria awaensis (S.A.Mori & Cornejo) Cornejo
- Scottmoria brevipetiolata (S.A.Mori & Cornejo) Cornejo
- Scottmoria calyculata (Pittier) Cornejo
- Scottmoria caudiculata (R.Knuth) Cornejo
- Scottmoria collinsii (Pittier) Cornejo
- Scottmoria decurrens Cornejo
- Scottmoria hondurensis (Standl.) Cornejo
- Scottmoria integrifolia (Ruiz & Pav. ex Miers) Cornejo
- Scottmoria jacquelyniae (S.A.Mori) Cornejo
- Scottmoria jefensis (J.E.Bat. & S.A.Mori) Cornejo
- Scottmoria ovalifolia (DC.) Cornejo
- Scottmoria pachyderma (Cuatrec.) Cornejo
- Scottmoria panamensis (Pittier) Cornejo
- Scottmoria podoaquilae (Cornejo) Cornejo
- Scottmoria rimbachii (Standl.) Cornejo
- Scottmoria roseocalyx (J.E.Bat., S.A.Mori & J.S.Harrison) Cornejo
- Scottmoria rotundicarpa (J.E.Bat. & S.A.Mori) Cornejo
- Scottmoria sclerophylla (Cuatrec.) Cornejo
- Scottmoria sessilis (A.C.Sm.) Cornejo
- Scottmoria silverstonei (Cornejo) Cornejo
- Scottmoria spiralocucullata S.A.Mori & Cornejo
