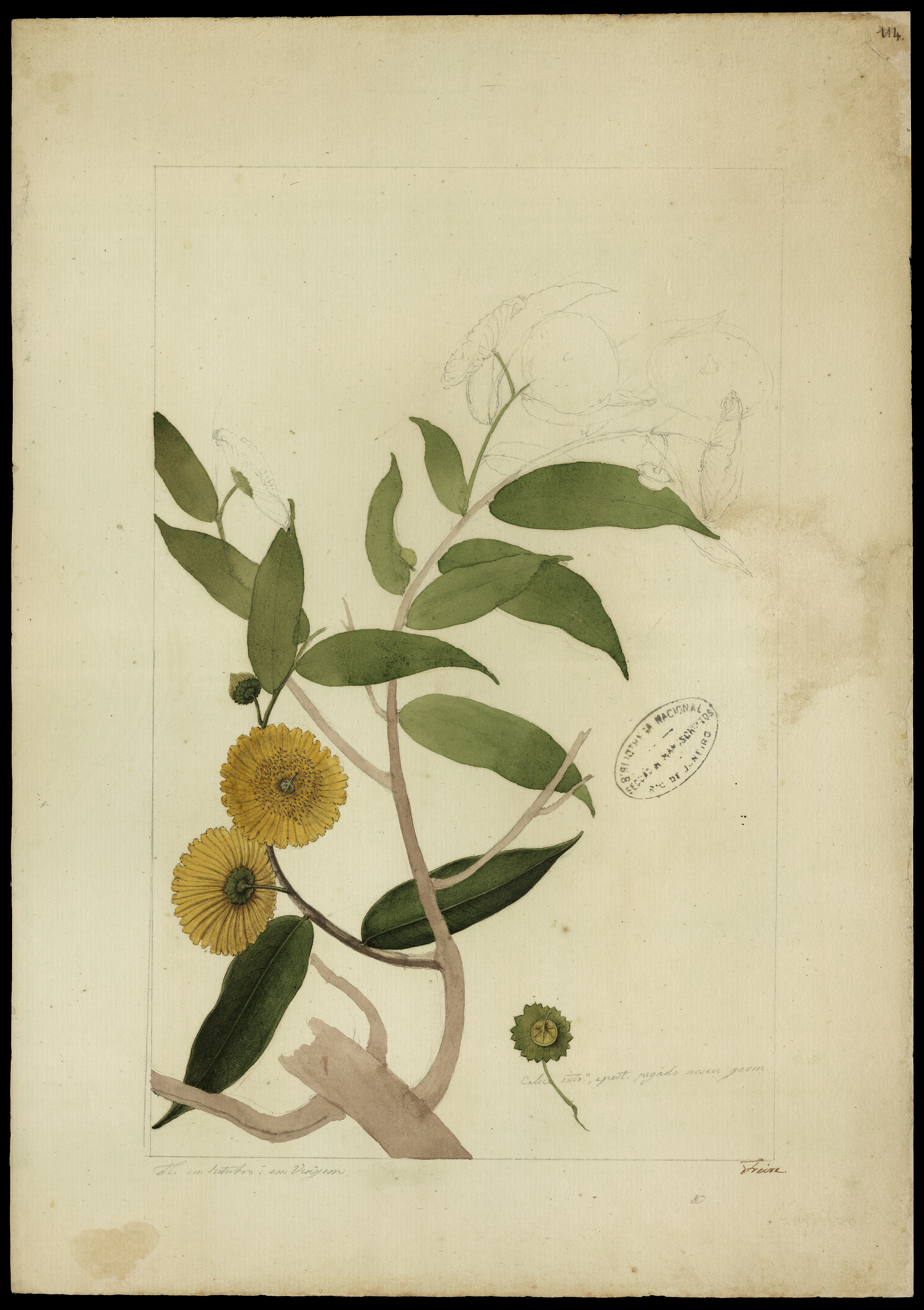

Conservation status
- Least Concern (IUCN 3.1)

Scientific classification
- Kingdom: Plantae
- Clade: Embryophytes
- Clade: Tracheophytes
- Clade: Spermatophytes
- Clade: Angiosperms
- Clade: Eudicots
- Clade: Asterids
- Order: Ericales
- Family: Lecythidaceae
- Subfamily: Scytopetaloideae
- Genus: Asteranthos; Desf.
- Species: A. brasiliensis

Binomial name
- Asteranthos brasiliensis Desf.

Synonyms
- Asteranthus Spreng.

= Asteranthos =

Genus of flowering plants

Asteranthos is a genus of woody plant in the family Lecythidaceae. There is only one known species, Asteranthos brasiliensis, native to Venezuela and Brazil.
