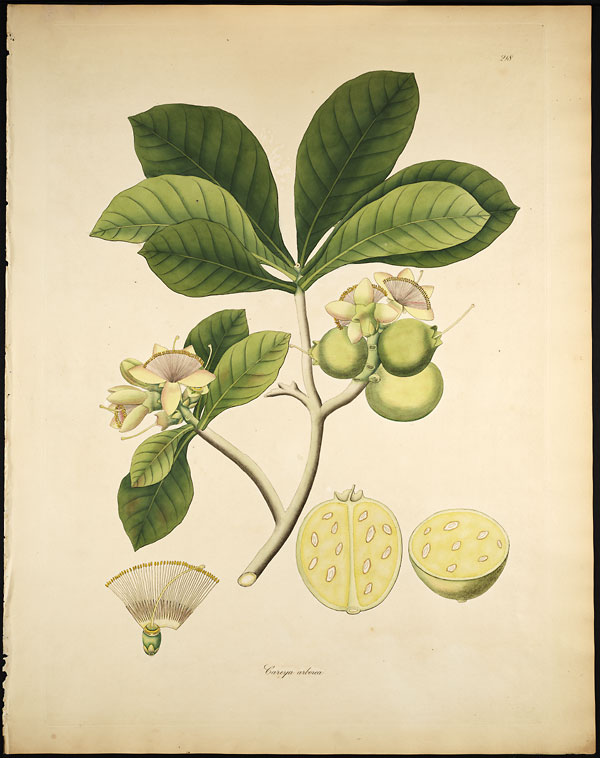

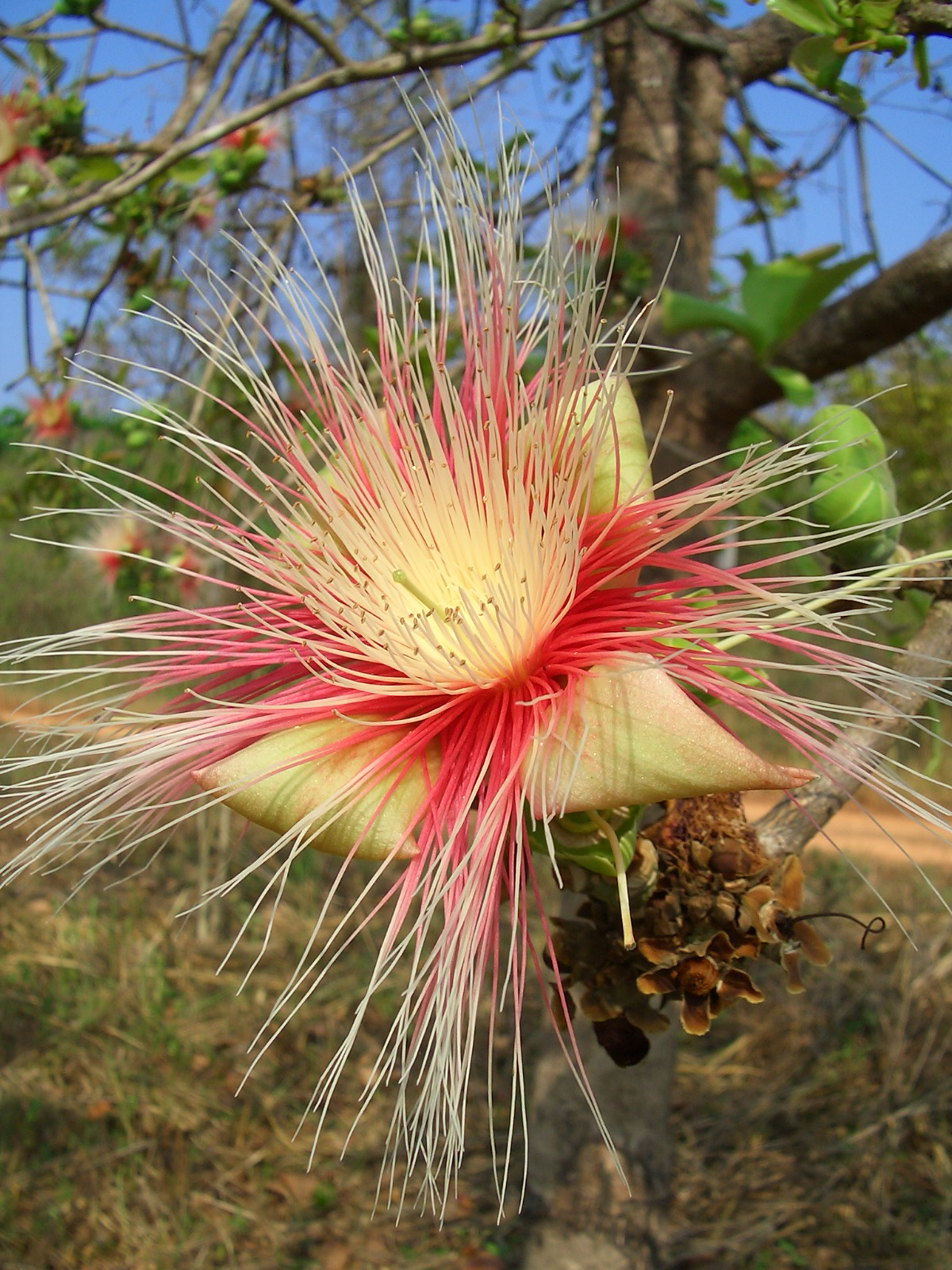
- Careya arborea

Scientific classification
- Kingdom: Plantae
- Clade: Tracheophytes
- Clade: Angiosperms
- Clade: Eudicots
- Clade: Asterids
- Order: Ericales
- Family: Lecythidaceae
- Subfamily: Barringtonioidea
- Genus: Careya; Roxb.

Synonyms
- Cumbia Buch.-Ham.

= Careya =

Genus of flowering plants

Careya is a genus of flowering plants in the family Lecythidaceae. It is native to the Indian Subcontinent, Afghanistan, Indochina, and Peninsular Malaysia.

== Taxonomy ==
It was first described as a genus by William Roxburgh in volume 3 part 1 of Plants of the Coast of Coromandel. The title page of this volume gives the date of publication as 1819, but the International Plant Names Index states that this part was first published in 1811, and this is the date accepted by IPNI and Tropicos, for example. Careya (not to be confused with Carya in the walnut family) is a conserved name, and 1811 is also the date given in the conservation proposal.

Species

- Careya arborea Roxb. – most of genus range from Afghanistan to Singapore
- Careya herbacea Roxb. – Himalayas (N + E India, Nepal, Bhutan, Bangladesh)
- Careya valida Kurz – Andaman Islands
