= Scottmoria rimbachii =

Conservation status
- Least Concern (IUCN 3.1)

Scientific classification
- Kingdom: Plantae
- Clade: Tracheophytes
- Clade: Angiosperms
- Clade: Eudicots
- Clade: Asterids
- Order: Ericales
- Family: Lecythidaceae
- Genus: Scottmoria
- Species: S. rimbachii

Binomial name
- Scottmoria rimbachii (Standl.) Cornejo

Synonyms
- Eschweilera rimbachii Standl.

Species of flowering plant

Scottmoria rimbachii is a species of flowering plant in the family Lecythidaceae. It is a tree native to Colombia and Ecuador. It grows in lowland and montane rain forests from sea level to 3,600 meters elevation.
