= Brazzeia =

Scientific classification
- Kingdom: Plantae
- Clade: Tracheophytes
- Clade: Angiosperms
- Clade: Eudicots
- Clade: Asterids
- Order: Ericales
- Family: Lecythidaceae
- Subfamily: Scytopetaloideae
- Genus: Brazzeia; Baill.

Synonyms
- Erytropyxis Pierre; Pseudobrazzeia Engl.

Genus of flowering plants

Brazzeia is a genus of plants in the family Lecythidaceae. It includes three species native to central tropical Africa.

== Species ==
Three species are accepted.

- Brazzeia congoensis Baill.
- Brazzeia longipedicellata Verdc.
- Brazzeia soyauxii (Oliv.) Tiegh.
