= Scytopetalum =

Scientific classification
- Kingdom: Plantae
- Clade: Tracheophytes
- Clade: Angiosperms
- Clade: Eudicots
- Clade: Asterids
- Order: Ericales
- Family: Lecythidaceae
- Subfamily: Scytopetaloideae
- Genus: Scytopetalum; Pierre ex Engl.

Genus of plants

Scytopetalum is a genus of flowering plants belonging to the family Lecythidaceae.

Its native range is Western and Western Central Tropical Africa.

Species:

- Scytopetalum kamerunianum Engl.
- Scytopetalum klaineanum Pierre ex Engl.
- Scytopetalum pierreanum (De Wild.) Tiegh.
- Scytopetalum tieghemii (A.Chev.) Hutch. & Dalziel
