= Eschweilera mexicana =

Cajita

Conservation status
- Vulnerable (IUCN 2.3)

Scientific classification
- Kingdom: Plantae
- Clade: Tracheophytes
- Clade: Angiosperms
- Clade: Eudicots
- Clade: Asterids
- Order: Ericales
- Family: Lecythidaceae
- Genus: Eschweilera
- Species: E. mexicana

Binomial name
- Eschweilera mexicana Wendt, S.A.Mori & Prance

Species of flowering plant

Eschweilera mexicana, the cajita or jicarillo, is a species of woody plant in the family Lecythidaceae. It is found only in Mexico. It is threatened by habitat loss.
