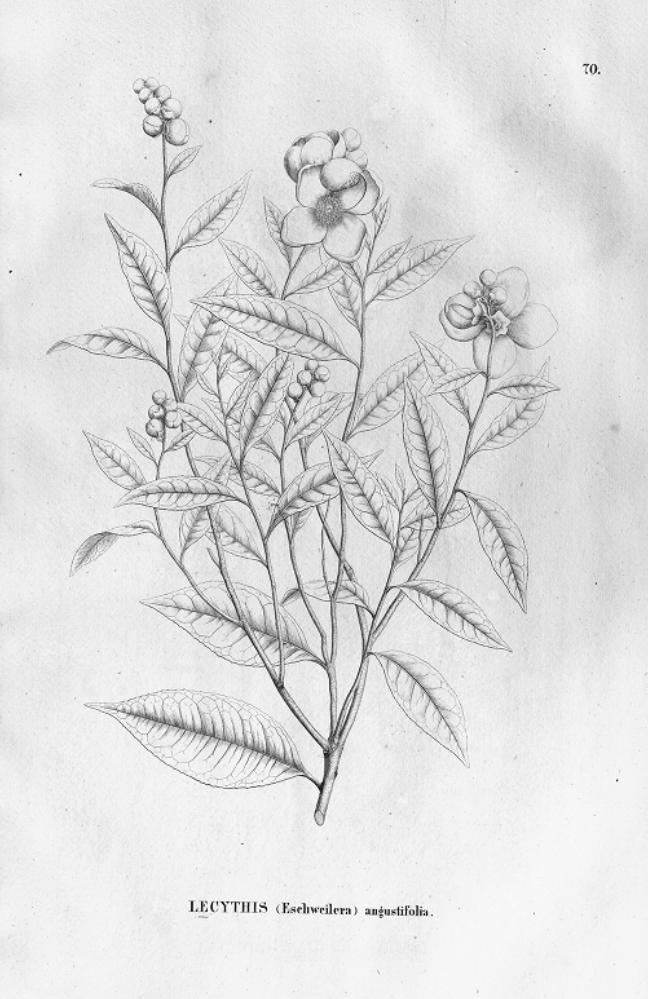

Conservation status
- Endangered (IUCN 3.1)

Scientific classification
- Kingdom: Plantae
- Clade: Tracheophytes
- Clade: Angiosperms
- Clade: Eudicots
- Clade: Asterids
- Order: Ericales
- Family: Lecythidaceae
- Genus: Imbiriba
- Species: I. compressa

Binomial name
- Imbiriba compressa (Vell.) O.M.Vargas, M.Ribeiro & C.W.Dick

Synonyms
- Chytroma incarcerata Miers; Couratari glabra Cambess.; Eschweilera angustifolia Mart.; Eschweilera compressa (Vell.) Miers; Eschweilera guanabarica Miers; Lecythis angustifolia (Mart.) Endl. ex Walp.; Lecythis compressa Vell.; Lecythis glabra (Cambess.) O.Berg; Lecythopsis glabra (Cambess.) O.Berg

= Imbiriba compressa =

Species of flowering plant

Imbiriba compressa is a species of flowering plant in the family Lecythidaceae. It is a tree endemic to southeastern Brazil. It grows in moist montane forest in the coastal Serra do Mar of Rio de Janeiro and Espiritu Santo states. It is threatened by habitat loss.
