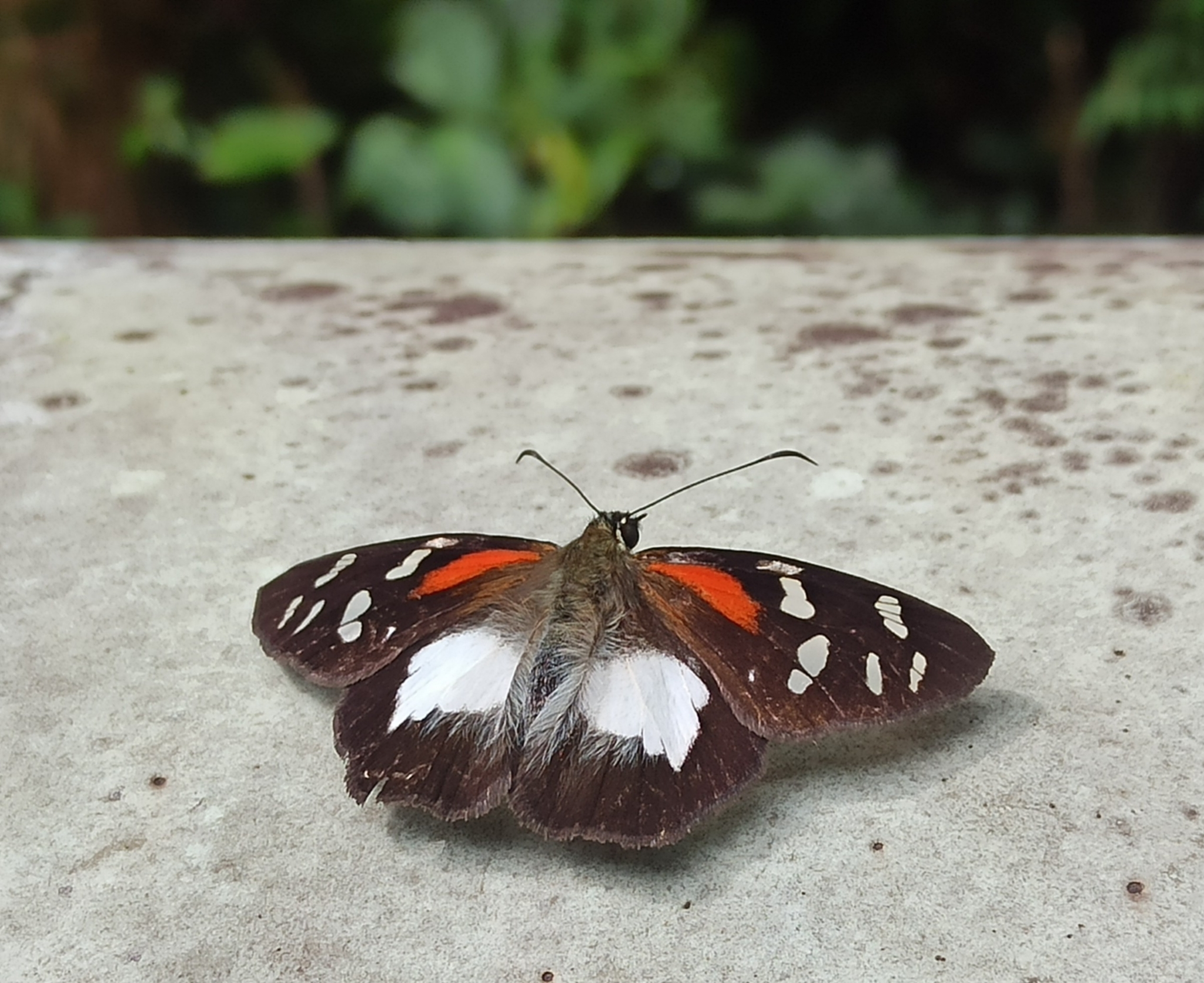
- Entheus dius

Scientific classification
- Kingdom: Animalia
- Phylum: Arthropoda
- Clade: Pancrustacea
- Class: Insecta
- Order: Lepidoptera
- Family: Hesperiidae
- Tribe: Entheini
- Genus: Entheus; Hübner, [1819]

Synonyms
- Peleus Swainson, 1831; Brachycneme C. & R. Felder, 1862

= Entheus =

Genus of butterflies

Entheus is a Neotropical genus of skippers in the family Hesperiidae, in which it is placed in the tribe Entheini of which it is the type genus.

== Species ==
- Entheus aureanota Austin, Mielke & Steinhauser, 1997
- Entheus aureolus Austin, Mielke & Steinhauser, 1997
- Entheus bombus Austin, Mielke & Steinhauser, 1997
- Entheus crux Steinhauser, 1989
- Entheus curvus Austin, 1997
- Entheus eumelus (Cramer, 1777)
- Entheus eunyas Austin, Mielke & Steinhauser, 1997
- Entheus gentius (Cramer, 1777)
- Entheus huertasae Grishin, 2013
- Entheus latebrosus Austin, 1997
- Entheus lemna (Butler, 1870)
- Entheus matho Godman & Salvin, 1879
- Entheus ninyas Druce, 1912
- Entheus priassus (Linnaeus, 1758)
- Entheus telemus Mabille, 1898
- Entheus warreni Grishin, 2012
