= Chydenanthus =

Conservation status
- Least Concern (IUCN 3.1)

Scientific classification
- Kingdom: Plantae
- Clade: Tracheophytes
- Clade: Angiosperms
- Clade: Eudicots
- Clade: Asterids
- Order: Ericales
- Family: Lecythidaceae
- Genus: Chydenanthus; Miers
- Species: C. excelsus

Binomial name
- Chydenanthus excelsus (Blume) Miers

Synonyms
- Homotypic Synonyms: Barringtonia excelsa Blume; Michelia excelsa (Blume) Kuntze; Stravadium excelsum (Blume) DC.; Heterotypic Synonyms: Barringtonia cymosa C.E.C.Fisch.; Barringtonia pietersii R.Knuth; Barringtonia vriesei Teijsm. & Binn.; Doxomma vriesei (Teijsm. & Binn.) Miers; Michelia vriesei (Teijsm. & Binn.) Kuntze

Genus of flowering plants

Chydenanthus is a genus of woody plant in the family Lecythidaceae first described as a genus in 1875. There is only one known species, Chydenanthus excelsus, native to Indonesia, Myanmar, New Guinea, and the Andaman & Nicobar Islands.
