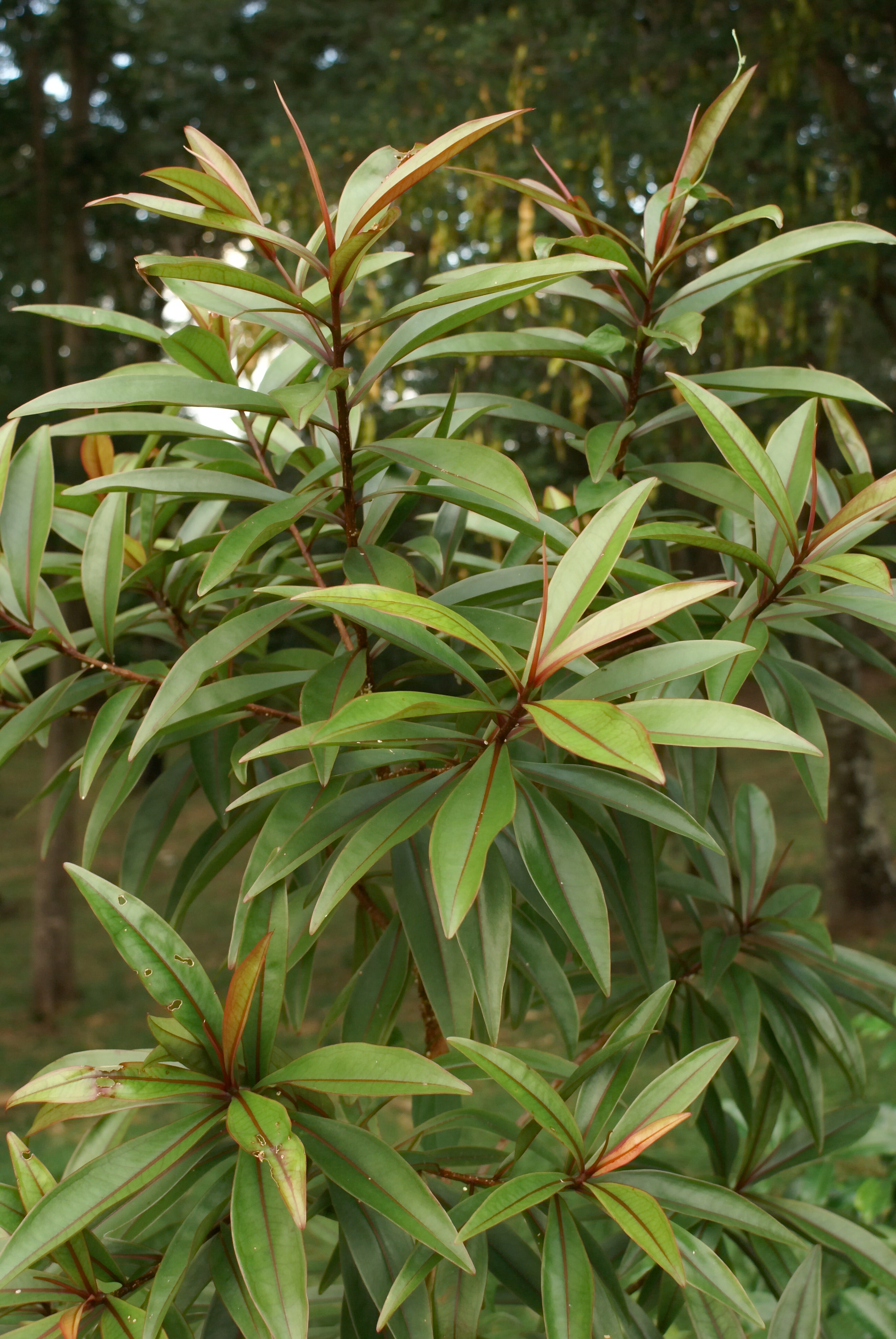
- Foetidia mauritiana

Scientific classification
- Kingdom: Plantae
- Clade: Tracheophytes
- Clade: Angiosperms
- Clade: Eudicots
- Clade: Asterids
- Order: Ericales
- Family: Lecythidaceae
- Subfamily: Foetidioideae
- Genus: Foetidia; Comm. ex Lam.

= Foetidia =

Genus of trees

Foetidia is a genus of flowering plants first described as a genus in 1788.

Most authors place the genus in the family Lecythidaceae, the sole genus in the subfamily Foetidioideae, but some prefer to treat it as a distinct family, the Foetidiaceae. It is native to eastern Africa and to various islands in the Indian Ocean.

== Species ==
1. Foetidia africana - Uzaramo District in Tanzania
2. Foetidia asymetrica - Madagascar
3. Foetidia capuronii - Madagascar
4. Foetidia clusioides - Madagascar
5. Foetidia comorensis - Mayotte
6. Foetidia cuneata - Madagascar
7. Foetidia delphinensis - Madagascar
8. Foetidia dracaenoides - Madagascar
9. Foetidia macrocarpa - Madagascar
10. Foetidia mauritiana - Mauritius, Réunion
11. Foetidia obliqua - Pemba I, Madagascar
12. Foetidia parviflora - Madagascar
13. Foetidia pterocarpa - Madagascar
14. Foetidia retusa - Madagascar
15. Foetidia rodriguesiana - Rodrigues
16. Foetidia rubescens - Madagascar
17. Foetidia sambiranensis - Madagascar
18. Foetidia vohemarensis - Madagascar

The wood of Foetidia mauritiana is one of several woods known as stinkwood because of its unpleasant smell.
