= Scottmoria sclerophylla =

Conservation status
- Least Concern (IUCN 3.1)

Scientific classification
- Kingdom: Plantae
- Clade: Tracheophytes
- Clade: Angiosperms
- Clade: Eudicots
- Clade: Asterids
- Order: Ericales
- Family: Lecythidaceae
- Genus: Scottmoria
- Species: S. sclerophylla

Binomial name
- Scottmoria sclerophylla (Cuatrec.) Cornejo

Synonyms
- Eschweilera sclerophylla Cuatrec.

Species of flowering plant

Scottmoria sclerophylla is a species of flowering plant in the family Lecythidaceae. It is a tree endemic to Colombia. It is native to the rain forests of Colombia's Pacific region, where it grows in the lowland Chocó–Darién moist forests (below 1000 meter elevation) and Northwestern Andean montane forests (above 1000 meters elevation), from sea level to 2,100 meters elevation.

The species was first described as Eschweilera sclerophylla by José Cuatrecasas in 1951. In 2024 Xavier Cornejo placed the species in the newly described genus Scottmoria as S. sclerophylla.
