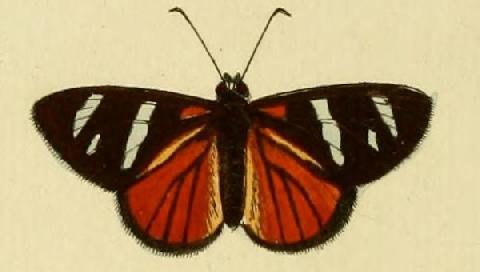

Scientific classification
- Kingdom: Animalia
- Phylum: Arthropoda
- Class: Insecta
- Order: Lepidoptera
- Family: Hesperiidae
- Genus: Entheus
- Species: E. eumelus

Binomial name
- Entheus eumelus (Cramer, 1777)

Synonyms
- Papilio eumelus Cramer, 1777; Entheus mina Williams & Bell, 1931

= Entheus eumelus =

Species of butterfly

Entheus eumelus is a species of butterfly of the family Hesperiidae. It is found from Central America to Suriname.
