= Oubanguia =

Scientific classification
- Kingdom: Plantae
- Clade: Tracheophytes
- Clade: Angiosperms
- Clade: Eudicots
- Clade: Asterids
- Order: Ericales
- Family: Lecythidaceae
- Subfamily: Scytopetaloideae
- Genus: Oubanguia; Baill.

Genus of plants

Oubanguia is a genus of flowering plants belonging to the family Lecythidaceae.

Its native range is Africa.

== Species ==
Species:

- Oubanguia africana Baill.
- Oubanguia alata Baker f.
- Oubanguia laurifolia (Pierre) Tiegh.
