= Pierrina =

Conservation status
- Near Threatened (IUCN 3.1)

Scientific classification
- Kingdom: Plantae
- Clade: Tracheophytes
- Clade: Angiosperms
- Clade: Eudicots
- Clade: Asterids
- Order: Ericales
- Family: Lecythidaceae
- Subfamily: Scytopetaloideae
- Genus: Pierrina; Engl.
- Species: P. zenkeri

Binomial name
- Pierrina zenkeri Engl.

Synonyms
- Pierrina longifolia Engl.

Species of plants

Pierrina is a monotypic genus of flowering plants belonging to the family Lecythidaceae. It only contains one known species, Pierrina zenkeri.

It is native to Gabon, Equatorial Guinea and Cameroon.

The genus name of Pierrina is in honour of Jean Baptiste Louis Pierre (1833–1905), a French botanist known for his Asian studies. The Latin specific epithet of zenkeri is derived from botanist Friderich Albert von Zenker (1825-1898). Both the genus and the species were first described and published in Bot. Jahrb. Syst. Vol.43 on pages 374-376 in 1909.
