= Guaiania =

Scientific classification
- Kingdom: Plantae
- Clade: Tracheophytes
- Clade: Angiosperms
- Clade: Eudicots
- Clade: Asterids
- Order: Ericales
- Family: Lecythidaceae
- Subfamily: Lecythidoideae
- Genus: Guaiania; O.M.Vargas & C.W.Dick

Genus of flowering plants

Guaiania is a genus of flowering plants in the family Lecythidaceae. It includes five species native to northern and northeastern Brazil, the Guianas, and Venezuela.

The species in Guaiania constitute the former Corrugata clade of genus Lecythis. Vargas et al. published a phylogenetic study in 2024 which concluded that Lecythis was polyphyletic, and the authors proposed new or revived genera, including Guaiania, for the paraphyletic sections of Lecythis.

== Species ==
19 species are accepted.

- Guaiania confertiflora (A.C.Sm.) O.M.Vargas & C.W.Dick
- Guaiania corrugata (Poit.) O.M.Vargas & C.W.Dick
- Guaiania idatimon (Aubl.) O.M.Vargas & C.W.Dick
- Guaiania persistens (Sagot) O.M.Vargas & C.W.Dick
- Guaiania pneumatophora (S.A.Mori) O.M.Vargas & C.W.Dick
