= Scottmoria collinsii =

Conservation status
- Data Deficient (IUCN 2.3)

Scientific classification
- Kingdom: Plantae
- Clade: Tracheophytes
- Clade: Angiosperms
- Clade: Eudicots
- Clade: Asterids
- Order: Ericales
- Family: Lecythidaceae
- Genus: Scottmoria
- Species: S. collinsii

Binomial name
- Scottmoria collinsii (Pittier) Cornejo

Synonyms
- Eschweilera collinsii Pittier; Eschweilera longirachis S.A.Mori

Species of flowering plant

Scottmoria collinsii is a species of flowering plant in the family Lecythidaceae. It is a tree native to Costa Rica and Panama.

The species was first described as Eschweilera collinsii by Henri François Pittier in 1908. In 2024 Xavier Cornejo placed the species in the newly-described genus Scottmoria as S. collinsii. Eschweilera longirachis is a synonym.
