= Pachylecythis =

Scientific classification
- Kingdom: Plantae
- Clade: Tracheophytes
- Clade: Angiosperms
- Clade: Eudicots
- Clade: Asterids
- Order: Ericales
- Family: Lecythidaceae
- Subfamily: Lecythidoideae
- Genus: Pachylecythis; Ledoux

Genus of flowering plants

Pachylecythis is a genus of flowering plants in the family Lecythidaceae. It includes five species native to the tropical Americas, ranging from Nicaragua to Bolivia and southeastern Brazil.

The genus was first described by E.P. Ledoux in 1964. It was later synonymized with genus Lecythis. In 2024 Vargas et al. published phylogenetic study which concluded that Lecythis was polyphyletic. The authors proposed reinstating Pachylecythis to encompass the paraphyletic Pisonis section of Lecythis.

== Species ==
Five species are accepted.

- Pachylecythis ampla (Miers) O.M.Vargas & C.W.Dick
- Pachylecythis lanceolata (Poir.) O.M.Vargas & C.W.Dick
- Pachylecythis marcgraaviana (Miers) O.M.Vargas & C.W.Dick
- Pachylecythis pisonis (Cambess.) O.M.Vargas & C.W.Dick
- Pachylecythis zabucajo (Aubl.) O.M.Vargas & C.W.Dick
