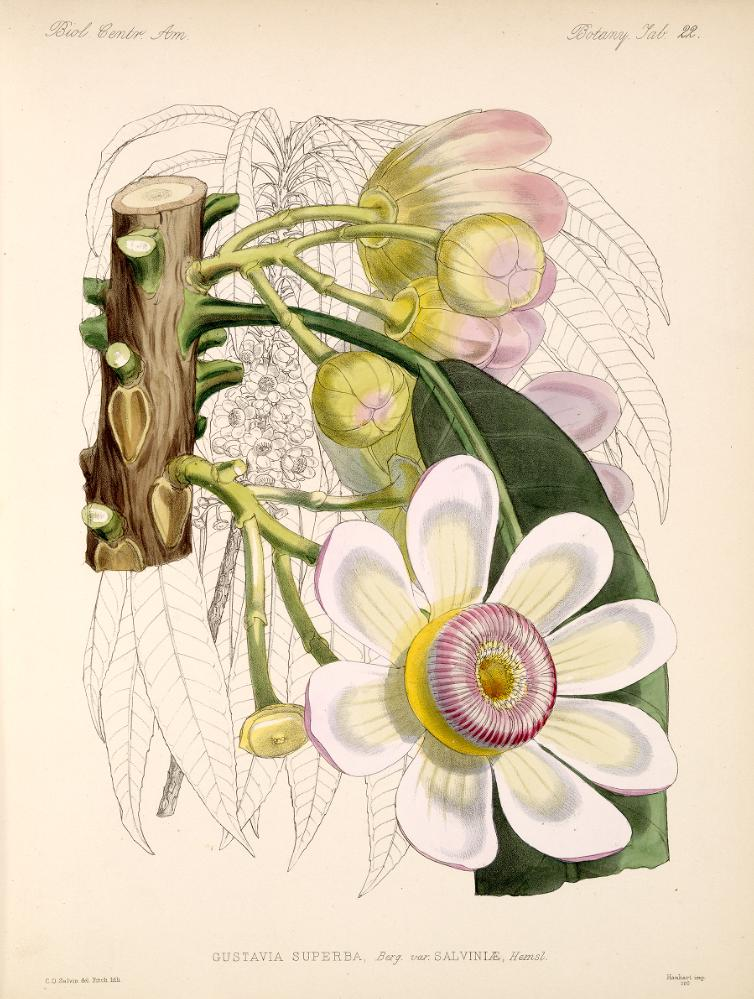
- Gustavia superba

Scientific classification
- Kingdom: Plantae
- Clade: Tracheophytes
- Clade: Angiosperms
- Clade: Eudicots
- Clade: Asterids
- Order: Ericales
- Family: Lecythidaceae
- Subfamily: Lecythidoideae
- Genus: Gustavia; L.

Synonyms
- Holopyxidium Scop.; Japarandiba Adans.; Perigaria Span.; Pirigara Aubl.; Spallanzania Neck.

= Gustavia (plant) =

Genus of flowering plants

Gustavia is a genus of flowering plants in the family Lecythidaceae described by Linnaeus in 1775. It is native to tropical Central America and South America. Many of the species are threatened; some are critically endangered Gustavia superba, though, is actually abundant in re-growing secondary forests. It grows in northern South America, from Panama south through the Andes as far as Ecuador, and along the Caribbean coast and in the Amazon basin. Gustavia flowers have numerous stamens, in some species as many as 1,200 in a single flower.

The genus name was given by Linnaeus to honor his king, Gustav III of Sweden.

== Species ==
List of species within the genus:

1. Gustavia acuminata - S Venezuela, Roraima
2. Gustavia angustifolia - Colombia, Ecuador
3. Gustavia augusta - Colombia to Amapá and Bolivia
4. Gustavia brachycarpa - Costa Rica, Panama
5. Gustavia coriacea - V Amazonas
6. Gustavia dodsonii - Ecuador
7. Gustavia dubia - Colombia, Panama
8. Gustavia elliptica - N Brazil
9. Gustavia erythrocarpa - Pará
10. Gustavia excelsa - Colombia
11. Gustavia flagellata - N Venezuela
12. Gustavia foliosa - Colombia, Ecuador
13. Gustavia fosteri - Panama
14. Gustavia gentryi - Colombia
15. Gustavia gigantophylla - E Venezuela, Guyana
16. Gustavia gracillima - Colombia
17. Gustavia gracillipes - Colombia
18. Gustavia grandibracteata - Colombia, Panama
19. Gustavia hexapetala - Colombia to Amapá and Bolivia
20. Gustavia inakuama - Peru
21. Gustavia latifolia - Colombia
22. Gustavia longepetiolata - Pará
23. Gustavia longifolia - Colombia, Ecuador, Peru, N Brazil
24. Gustavia longifuniculata - Colombia
25. Gustavia marcarenensis - Colombia, Ecuador, Peru, Venezuela
26. Gustavia monocaulis - Colombia, Panama
27. Gustavia nana - Colombia, Panama
28. Gustavia occidentalis - Valle del Cauca
29. Gustavia parviflora - Venezuela
30. Gustavia petiolata - Colombia
31. Gustavia poepiggiana - Colombia to Guyana and Bolivia
32. Gustavia pubescens - Ecuador
33. Gustavia pulchra - S Venezuela, N Brazil
34. Gustavia romeroi - Colombia
35. Gustavia santanderiensis - Colombia
36. Gustavia serrata - Ecuador
37. Gustavia sessilis - Colombia
38. Gustavia speciosa - Colombia, Ecuador
39. Gustavia superba - Colombia, Panama, Ecuador
40. Gustavia tejerae - Zulia
41. Gustavia terminaliflora - N Peru
42. Gustavia verticillata - Colombia, Panama
