= Chytroma =

Scientific classification
- Kingdom: Plantae
- Clade: Tracheophytes
- Clade: Angiosperms
- Clade: Eudicots
- Clade: Asterids
- Order: Ericales
- Family: Lecythidaceae
- Subfamily: Lecythidoideae
- Genus: Chytroma; Miers

Synonyms
- Cercophora Miers; Holopyxidium Ducke; Sapucaya R.Knuth; Strailia T.Durand

Genus of flowering plants

Chytroma is a genus of flowering plants in the family Lecythidaceae. It includes 19 species native to the tropical Americas, ranging from Costa Rica to northern and eastern Brazil.

The genus was first described in 1874 by John Miers. It was later considered a synonym of Lecythis. A phylogenetic study published in 2024 by Vargas et al. concluded that Lecythis was polyphyletic, and the authors placed the Poiteau and Chartacea sections of Lecythis in the revived Chytroma.

== Species ==
19 species are accepted.

- Chytroma alutacea (A.C.Sm.) O.M.Vargas & C.W.Dick
- Chytroma barnebyi (S.A.Mori) O.M.Vargas & C.W.Dick
- Chytroma brancoensis R.Knuth
- Chytroma chartacea (O.Berg) Miers
- Chytroma congestiflora (Benoist) R.Knuth
- Chytroma gracieana (S.A.Mori) O.M.Vargas & C.W.Dick
- Chytroma holcogyne (Sandwith) R.Knuth
- Chytroma ibiriba Miers
- Chytroma lurida (Miers) O.M.Vargas & C.W.Dick
- Chytroma mesophylla (S.A.Mori) O.M.Vargas & C.W.Dick
- Chytroma parvifructa (S.A.Mori) O.M.Vargas & C.W.Dick
- Chytroma poiteaui (O.Berg) O.M.Vargas & C.W.Dick
- Chytroma prancei (S.A.Mori) O.M.Vargas & C.W.Dick
- Chytroma retusa (Spruce ex O.Berg) Miers
- Chytroma schomburgkii (O.Berg) Miers
- Chytroma schwackei (R.Knuth) O.M.Vargas & C.W.Dick
- Chytroma serrata (S.A.Mori) O.M.Vargas & C.W.Dick
- Chytroma simiorum (Benoist) R.Knuth
