= Imbiriba =

Scientific classification
- Kingdom: Plantae
- Clade: Tracheophytes
- Clade: Angiosperms
- Clade: Eudicots
- Clade: Asterids
- Order: Ericales
- Family: Lecythidaceae
- Subfamily: Lecythidoideae
- Genus: Imbiriba; O.M.Vargas, M.Ribeiro & C.W.Dick

Genus of flowering plants

Imbiriba is a genus of flowering plants in the family Lecythidaceae. It includes seven species native to northern, central, and eastern Brazil.

The species in Imbiriba constitute the former Tetrapetala section of genus Eschweilera. Vargas et al. published a phylogenetic study in 2024 which concluded that Eschweilera was polyphyletic, and the authors proposed new or revived genera, including Imbiriba, for species in the paraphyletic sections of Eschweilera.

== Species ==
Seven species are accepted.

- Imbiriba alvimii (S.A.Mori) O.M.Vargas, M.Ribeiro & C.W.Dick
- Imbiriba complanata (S.A.Mori) O.M.Vargas, M.Ribeiro & C.W.Dick
- Imbiriba compressa (Vell.) O.M.Vargas, M.Ribeiro & C.W.Dick
- Imbiriba mattos-silvae (S.A.Mori) O.M.Vargas, M.Ribeiro & C.W.Dick
- Imbiriba nana (O.Berg) O.M.Vargas, M.Ribeiro & C.W.Dick
- Imbiriba sphaerocarpa (M.Ribeiro & S.A.Mori) O.M.Vargas, M.Ribeiro & C.W.Dick
- Imbiriba tetrapetala (S.A.Mori) O.M.Vargas, M.Ribeiro & C.W.Dick
