= Gustavia angustifolia =

Scientific classification
- Kingdom: Plantae
- Clade: Tracheophytes
- Clade: Angiosperms
- Clade: Eudicots
- Clade: Asterids
- Order: Ericales
- Family: Lecythidaceae
- Genus: Gustavia
- Species: G. angustifolia

Binomial name
- Gustavia angustifolia Benth.

Species of flowering plant

Gustavia angustifolia is a small tree, native to South America, with large white flowers. It is an endangered species.

== Description ==
=== Leaves ===
Perhaps the most distinguishing feature of G. angustifolia is its leaves. G. angustifolia has an abaxial leaf surface that is covered in short, fine velvety hairs which is an uncommon trait among the genus Gustavia. In general the leaves are sessile but they can have petioles up to 30 mm long. The leaf blades tend to be narrow, having an oblong to oblanceolate shape, while the leaf bases are attenuate to acute in shape.

=== Flowers and reproduction ===
Gustavia angustifolia has a gametic chromosome number of n=17. The inflorescence of G. angustifolia is racemose and terminal, occurring at the end of the branches. Each raceme typically has 4–10 flowers and each flower has 8 petals. The pedicels of the flowers range from 35 to 100 mm in length. The buds of G.angustifolia are tomentose with a gray coloration. These flowers can grow to be 10–14.5 cm in diameter. The petals have an elliptical shape and are 50–65 mm long and 20–25 mm wide. The androecium of G.angustifolia is fused. The fruit are globe shaped with a flat summit.

== Habitat and ecology ==
Gustavia angustifolia is native to the dry deciduous forests of the coastal plain of Ecuador and Colombia. Pubescent leaves are beneficial in hot, dry environments such as these. The tiny hairs help to keep the leaves cool by reflecting light and casting tiny shadows on the leaf surface. In addition the hairs also provide a barrier between the leaf and the air thereby reducing the amount of exposed surface. Deflecting sunlight and decreasing exposed surface area of the leaf are both adaptations for preventing water loss in the plant. The flowers of this plant bloom in October and begin fruiting in November.

== Synonyms and common names ==
While Gustavia angustifolia is the official scientific name, in the past it has been called Japarandiba angustifolia, Japarandiba ruizana, Gustavia angusta, Gustavia ruiziana, and Gustavia corymbosa. Its common names are Membrillo de Monte and Membrillo de Montaña (Mountain quince).
