= Corythophora =

Scientific classification
- Kingdom: Plantae
- Clade: Embryophytes
- Clade: Tracheophytes
- Clade: Spermatophytes
- Clade: Angiosperms
- Clade: Eudicots
- Clade: Asterids
- Order: Ericales
- Family: Lecythidaceae
- Subfamily: Lecythidoideae
- Genus: Corythophora; R.Knuth

Genus of flowering plants

Corythophora is a genus of woody plant in the Lecythidaceae family first described as a genus in 1939. It is native to northeastern South America (French Guiana, Suriname, northern Brazil).

Species

1. Corythophora alta R.Knuth - Pará, Amazonas
2. Corythophora amapaensis Pires ex S.A.Mori & Prance - French Guiana, Amapá
3. Corythophora labriculata (Eyma) S.A.Mori & Prance - Suriname
4. Corythophora rimosa W.A.Rodrigues - French Guiana, Amazonas, Amapá, Suriname
