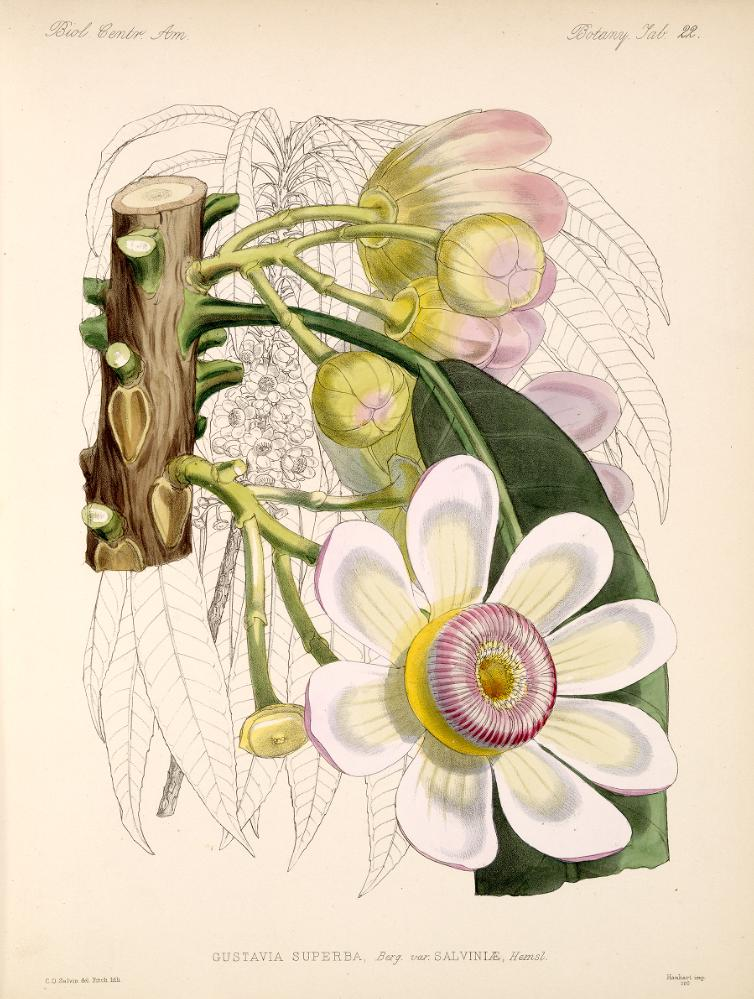

Scientific classification
- Kingdom: Plantae
- Clade: Tracheophytes
- Clade: Angiosperms
- Clade: Eudicots
- Clade: Asterids
- Order: Ericales
- Family: Lecythidaceae
- Genus: Gustavia
- Species: G. superba

Binomial name
- Gustavia superba (Kunth) O. Berg (1856)

= Gustavia superba =

Species of flowering plant

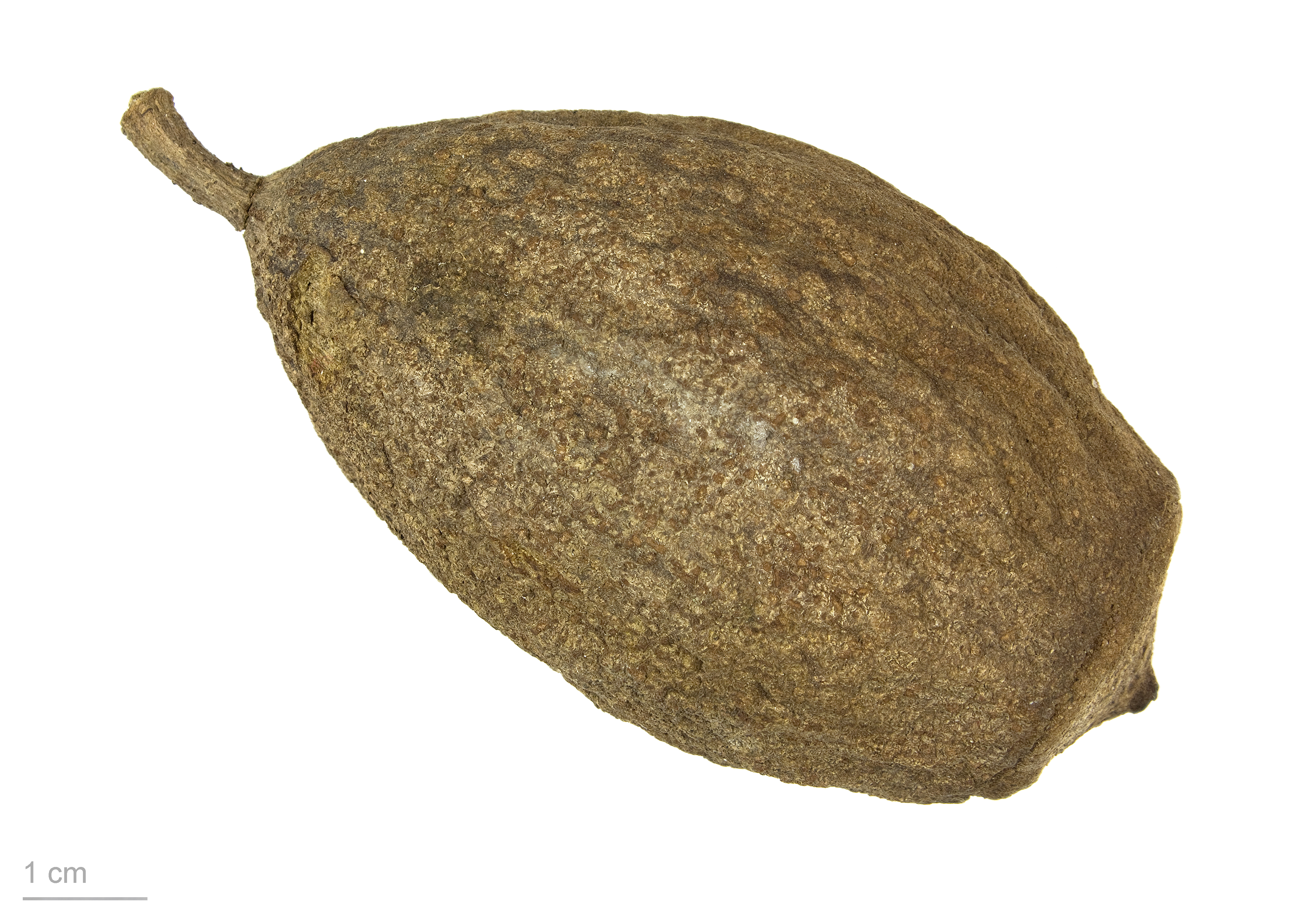
Gustavia superba - MHNT

Gustavia superba is an understory tree in the family Lecythidaceae, that grows in Central and north-western South America. Common names include membrillo, sachamango, Stinkwood and heaven lotus. The trunk is around 5-10 m high with a rosette of very large leaves radiating from the top (like palms). These leaves can be up to 1.28 m (4 ft 2 in) long by less than 30 cm wide.

== Ecology ==
Gustavia superba grows naturally as an understory tree, where it is abundant, especially in secondary forests . It appreciates abundant moisture, sun and well drained soil. It branches little until mature, and has a bunch of leaves at the top, so that it resembles a palm. Seeds are dispersed by agoutis. The leaves are a favourite food of iguanas.

== Fruit ==
It bears rounded pear shaped fruit, on the trunk (cauliflorous). Inside the hard green shell are several large seeds about 4 cm in diameter. The yellowish-orange pulp is edible, is usually boiled after which it is said to resemble meat in taste. It is rich in A, B and C vitamins.

== Distribution ==
The tree is not widely known outside its native range from Ecuador to Panama and Venezuela, but has been planted in tropical botanical gardens, including in Singapore (where it is referred to as 'pungol') and Australia.

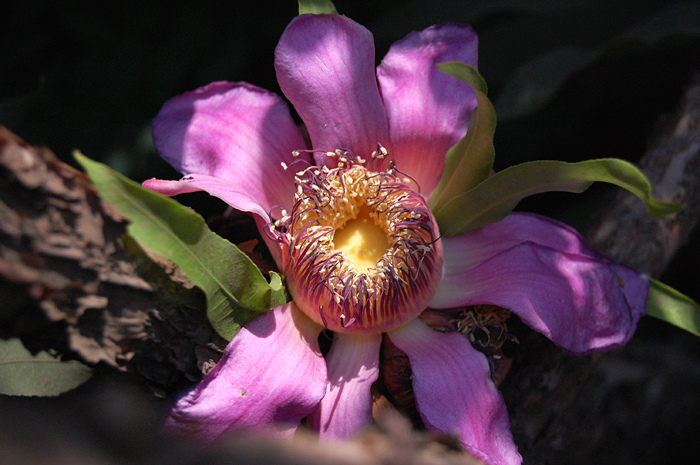
Gustavia superba flower
