= Scott Alan Mori =

American botanist and plant collector

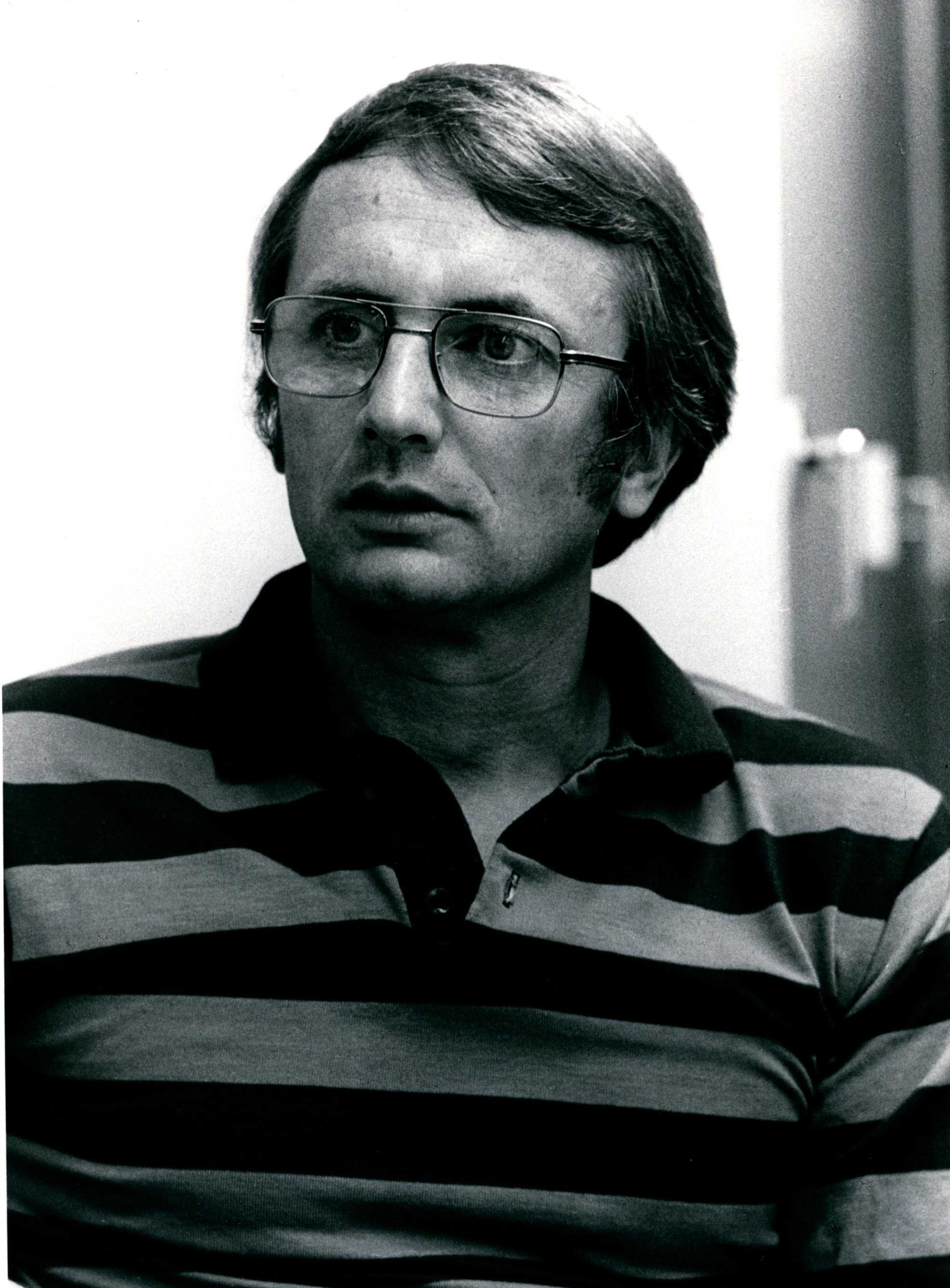
- Scott Mori in 1980
- Born: October 13, 1941
- Died: August 12, 2020 (aged 78)
- Education: University of Wisconsin–Stevens Point (B.S.); University of Wisconsin–Madison (M.S., Ph.D.)
- Scientific career
- Fields: Botany
- Workplaces: New York Botanical Garden
- Doctoral advisor: Hugh H. Iltis
- Author abbrev. (botany): S.A.Mori

Scott Alan Mori (October 13, 1941, Janesville, Wisconsin – August 12, 2020) was a Swiss and American botanist and plant collector. He specialized in the systematics and ecology of neotropical Lecythidaceae and Amazonian and Guianian floristics.

== Biography ==
Mori graduated in 1964 with a B.S. in biology and conservation from the University of Wisconsin–Stevens Point and in 1968 with an M.S. in botany from the University of Wisconsin–Madison. There he received in 1974 his Ph.D. in botany with dissertation Taxonomic and Anatomic Studies of Gustavia (Lecythidaceae) under the supervision of Hugh H. Iltis. From 1969 to 1974 Mori was an instructor in botany and zoology at the University of Wisconsin Center System at Marshfield. From 1974 to 1975 he was a curator at the Summit Herbarium in the Panama Canal Zone. From 1975 to 1978 he was a research associate at the New York Botanical Garden (NYBG) in the Bronx. From 1978 to 1980 he was a curator at Itabuna, Brazil's Centro de Pesquisas do Cacau (CEPEC) Herbarium (Cacao Research Center Herbarium, which was founded in 1965). At NYBG, he was an associate curator from 1980 to 1982, a curator from 1982 to 1995, the director of NYBG's Institute of Systematic Botany from 1995 to 2001, and Nathaniel Lord Britton Curator of Botany at the Institute of Systematic Botany from 1998 to 2014, when he retired as curator emeritus.

During his career Mori collected about 28,000 botanical specimens, mostly from the Neotropics and with a focus on lianas and trees. He was an adjunct professor at CUNY, Yale University, and Columbia University. He wrote "130 scientific papers about plants and conservation, dozens of popular articles and blogs, and 12 books."

Mori's 11 doctoral students include Brian Boom and John J. Pipoly III. Mori was married to Carol A. Gracie, a botanist and photographer. She worked with him on botanical research projects in South America. As part of the NYBG's ecotour program, the husband and wife team led dozens of botanical tours to many locations, including "the Amazon, Venezuela, Costa Rica, Ecuador, Galapagos, Hawaii, and various parts of Europe." Upon his death in 2020, Scott Mori was survived by his widow, a son, and two granddaughters, as well as step-children and step-grandchildren.

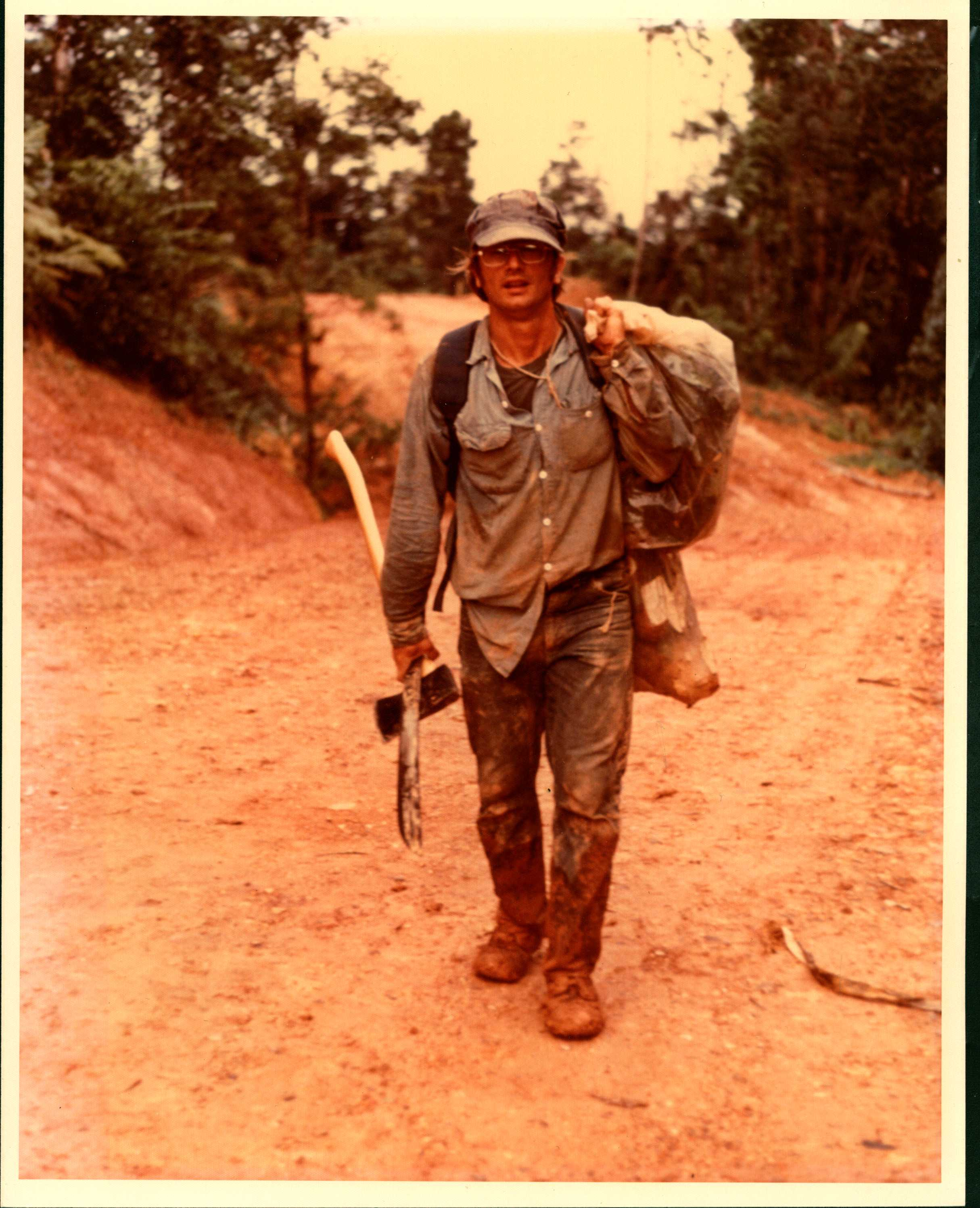
Scott Mori in the field collecting plants

== Awards and honors ==
- 1991–2001 — President of the Torrey Botanical Society
- 2002 — Engler Medal in Silver from the International Association of Plant Taxonomy
- 2007 — David Fairchild Medal for Plant Exploration from the National Tropical Botanical Garden
- 2007 — Asa Gray Award from the American Society of Plant Taxonomists

The Lecythidaceae genus Scottmoria was named in honor of Mori.

== Selected publications ==
=== Articles ===
- Prance, Ghillean T.; Mori, Scott A. (1978). "Observations on the Fruits and Seeds of Neotropical Lecythidaceae". Brittonia. 30 (1): 21–33. doi:10.2307/2806452. JSTOR 2806452. S2CID 31234002.
- Mori, Scott A.; Boom, Brian M.; Prance, Ghillean T. (1981). "Distribution Patterns and Conservation of Eastern Brazilian Coastal Forest Tree Species". Brittonia. 33 (2): 233–245. doi:10.2307/2806330. JSTOR 2806330. S2CID 85238627.
- Mori, Scott A.; Boom, Brian M.; De Carvalho, André M.; Dos Santos, Talmón S. (1983). "Southern Bahian moist forests". The Botanical Review. 49 (2): 155–232. doi:10.1007/BF02861011. S2CID 39878879.
- Mori, Scott A.; Boom, Brian M.; De Carvalho, Andre M.; Dos Santos, Talmon S. (1983). "Ecological Importance of Myrtaceae in an Eastern Brazilian Wet Forest". Biotropica. 15 (1): 68–70. doi:10.2307/2388002. JSTOR 2388002.
- Mori, Scott A.; Pipoly, John J. (1984). "Observations on the Big Bang Flowering of Miconia minutiflora (Melastomataceae)". Brittonia. 36 (4): 337–341. doi:10.2307/2806595. ISSN 0007-196X. JSTOR 2806595. S2CID 84465485.
- Funk, Vicki Ann; Mori, Scott A. (1989). "A bibliography of plant collectors in Bolivia" (PDF). Smithsonian Contributions to Botany (70): 1–20. doi:10.5479/si.0081024X.70; 20 pages
- Mori, Scott A.; Becker, Peter (1991). "Flooding Affects Survival of Lecythidaceae in Terra Firme Forest Near Manaus, Brazil". Biotropica. 23 (1): 87–90. doi:10.2307/2388692. JSTOR 2388692.
- Plotkin, Mark; Famolare, Lisa, eds. (1992). "The Brazil nut industry-past, present, and future by Scott A. Mori". Sustainable harvest and marketing of rain forest products. Island Press. pp. 241–251. ISBN 978-1-55963-169-3.
- Knudsen, J. T.; Mori, S. A. (1996). "Floral Scents and Pollination in Neotropical Lecythidaceae". Biotropica. 28 (1): 42–60. doi:10.2307/2388770. JSTOR 2388770.
- Morton, Cynthia M.; Mori, Scott A.; Prance, Ghillean T.; Karol, Ken G.; Chase, Mark W. (1997). "Phylogenetic Relationships of Lecythidaceae: A Cladistic Analysis Using RBCL Sequence and Morphological Data". American Journal of Botany. 84 (4): 530–540. doi:10.2307/2446029. JSTOR 2446029. PMID 21708605.
- De Oliveira, Alexandre A.; Mori, Scott A. (1999). "A central Amazonian terra firme forest. I. High tree species richness on poor soils". Biodiversity and Conservation. 8 (9): 1219–1244. doi:10.1023/A:1008908615271. S2CID 22428775.
- Kennelly, E.J.; Baggett, S.; Nuntanakorn, P.; Ososki, A.L.; Mori, S.A.; Duke, J.; Coleton, M.; Kronenberg, F. (2002). "Analysis of thirteen populations of Black Cohosh for formononetin". Phytomedicine. 9 (5): 461–467. doi:10.1078/09447110260571733. PMID 12222669.
- Lobova, T. A.; Mori, S. A.; Blanchard, F.; Peckham, H.; Charles-Dominique, P. (2003). "Cecropia as a food resource for bats in French Guiana and the significance of fruit structure in seed dispersal and longevity". American Journal of Botany. 90 (3): 388–403. doi:10.3732/ajb.90.3.388. PMID 21659132. (See Cecropia.)
- Gonzalez, Mailyn Adriana; Baraloto, Christopher; Engel, Julien; Mori, Scott A.; Pétronelli, Pascal; Riéra, Bernard; Roger, Aurélien; Thébaud, Christophe; Chave, Jérôme (2009). "Identification of Amazonian Trees with DNA Barcodes". PLOS ONE. 4 (10) e7483. Bibcode:2009PLoSO...4.7483G. doi:10.1371/journal.pone.0007483. PMC 2759516. PMID 19834612.
- Cardoso, Domingos; Särkinen, Tiina; Alexander, Sara; Amorim, André M.; Bittrich, Volker; Celis, Marcela; Daly, Douglas C.; Fiaschi, Pedro; Funk, Vicki A.; Giacomin, Leandro L.; Goldenberg, Renato; Heiden, Gustavo; Iganci, João; Kelloff, Carol L.; Knapp, Sandra; Cavalcante De Lima, Haroldo; Machado, Anderson F. P.; Dos Santos, Rubens Manoel; Mello-Silva, Renato; Michelangeli, Fabián A.; Mitchell, John; Moonlight, Peter; De Moraes, Pedro Luís Rodrigues; Mori, Scott A.; Nunes, Teonildes Sacramento; Pennington, Terry D.; Pirani, José Rubens; Prance, Ghillean T.; De Queiroz, Luciano Paganucci; et al. (2017). "Amazon plant diversity revealed by a taxonomically verified species list". Proceedings of the National Academy of Sciences. 114 (40): 10695–10700. Bibcode:2017PNAS..11410695C. doi:10.1073/pnas.1706756114. PMC 5635885. PMID 28923966. S2CID 7553581.

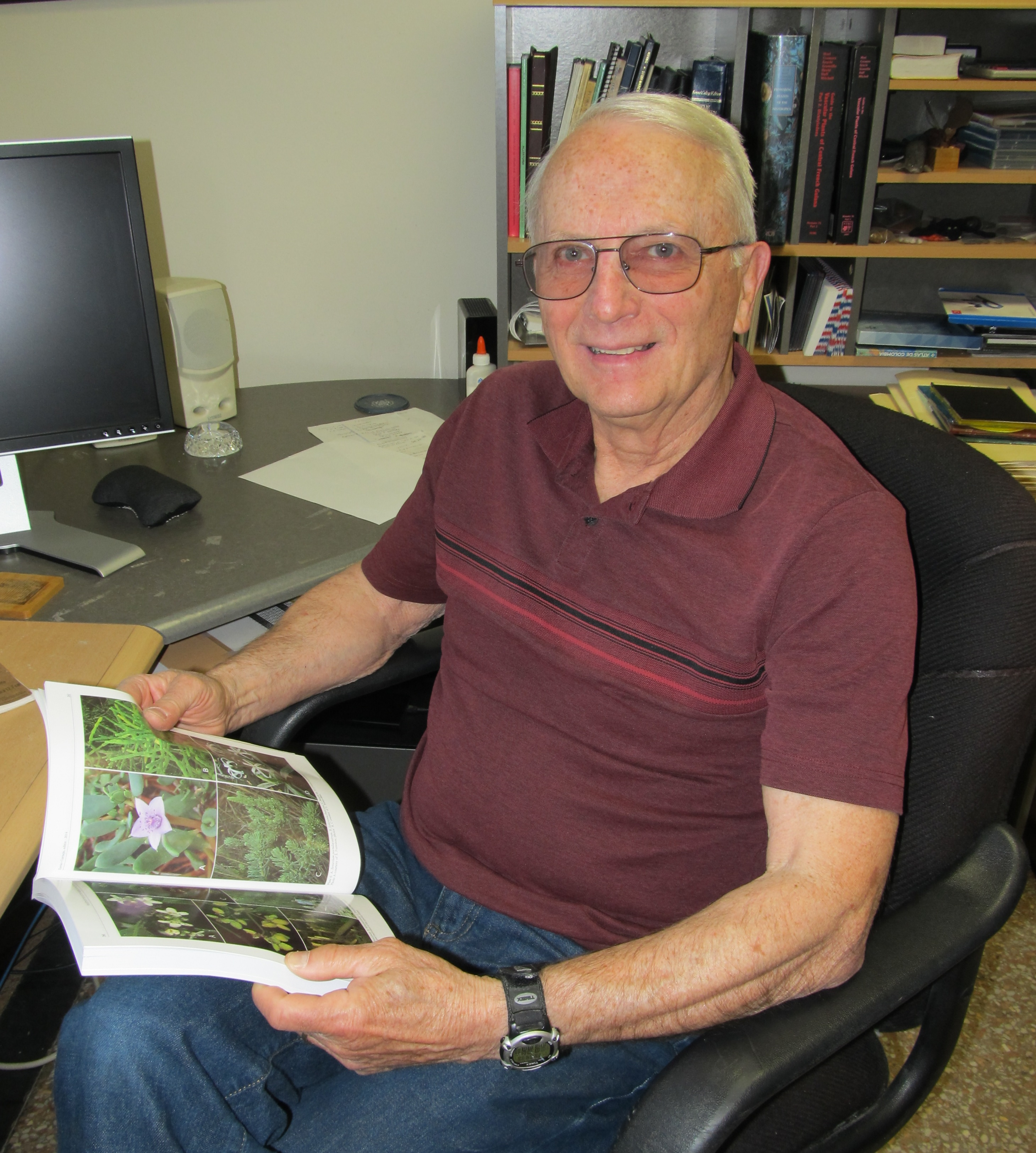
Scott Mori in his office at the New York Botanical Garden, 2015

=== Books ===
- Mori, Scott A. (1968). The Genus Lecythis in Central America.
- Mori, Scott A. (1974). Taxonomic and Anatomic Studies in Gustavia (Lecythidaceae).
- Mori, Scott A.; Prance, Ghillean T. (1990). Lecythidaceae: Part II. The zygomorphic-flowered New World genera (Couroupita, Corythophora, Betholletia, Couratari, Eschweilera, & Eschweilera, & Lecythis). Organization for Flora Neotropica. ISBN 978-0-89327-345-3.
- Mori, Scott A.; Zeeuw, Carl De; Prance, Ghillean Tolmie (1993). Phanerogams: Lecythidaceae. Koeltz Scientific Books. ISBN 978-3-87429-340-2.
- Mori S.A.; Cremers, Georges; Gracie, Carol; Granville, Jean-Jacques de; Hoff, Michel; Mitchell, John D. (1997). Guide to the Vascular Plants of Central French Guiana: Part 1. Pteridophytes, Gymnosperms and Monocotyledons. Memoirs of the New York Botanical Garden. Vol. 76. New York: New York Botanical Garden. ISBN 0-89327-398-8; 422 pages
- Mori, Scott A.; Cremers, Georges; Gracie, Carol; Granville, Jean-Jacques de; Heald, Scott V.; Hoff, Michel; Mitchell, John D. (1997). Guide to the Vascular Plants of Central French Guiana: Part 2. Dicotyledons. Memoirs of the New York Botanical Garden. Vol. 76. New York. ISBN 978-0-89327-445-0; 776 pages
- Mori, Scott A. (2011). Tropical Plant Collecting: From the Field to the Internet. TECC Editora. ISBN 978-85-65005-00-5.
