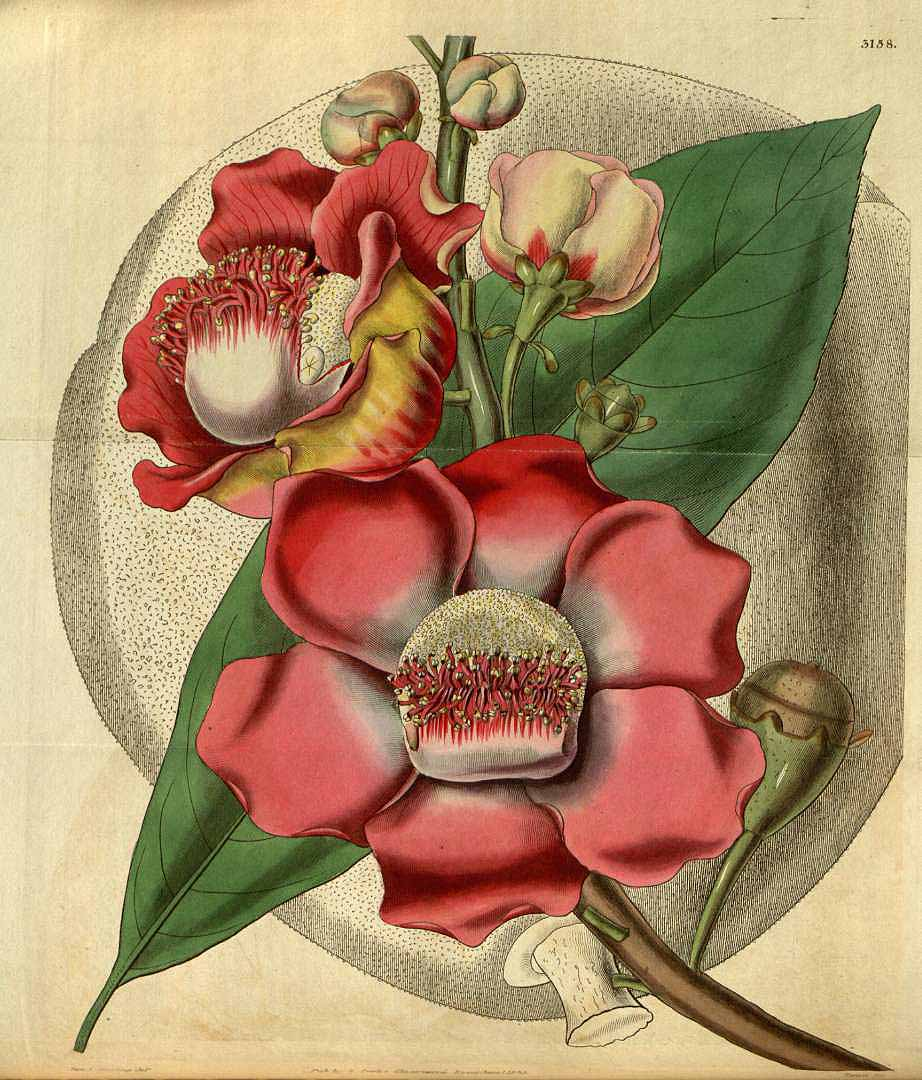
- Illustration of Couroupita guianensis by Lansdown Guilding

Scientific classification
- Kingdom: Plantae
- Clade: Embryophytes
- Clade: Tracheophytes
- Clade: Spermatophytes
- Clade: Angiosperms
- Clade: Eudicots
- Clade: Asterids
- Order: Ericales
- Family: Lecythidaceae; A.Rich.

Type genus
- Lecythis Loefl.

Genera
- See text

Synonyms
- Barringtoniaceae DC. ex F.Rudolphi; Scytopetalaceae Engl.

= Lecythidaceae =

Family of flowering plants in the order Ericales

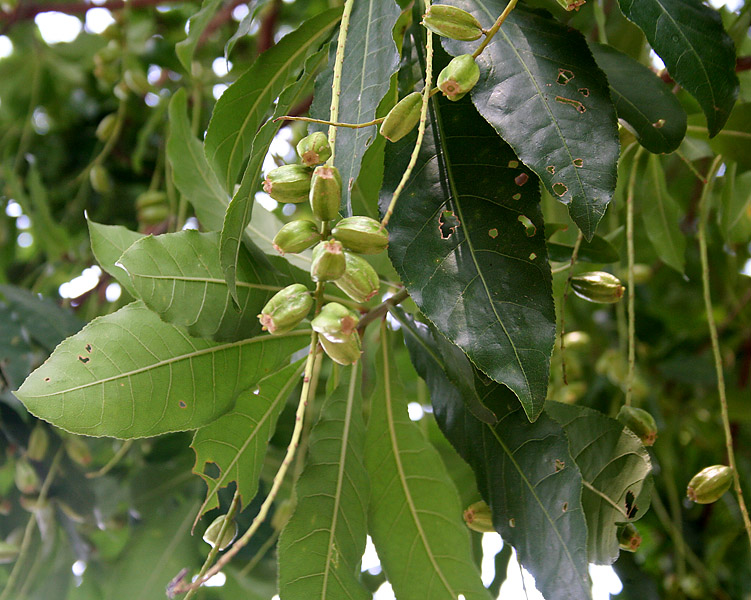
Barringtonia acutangula (freshwater mangrove) fruits in Kolkata, India

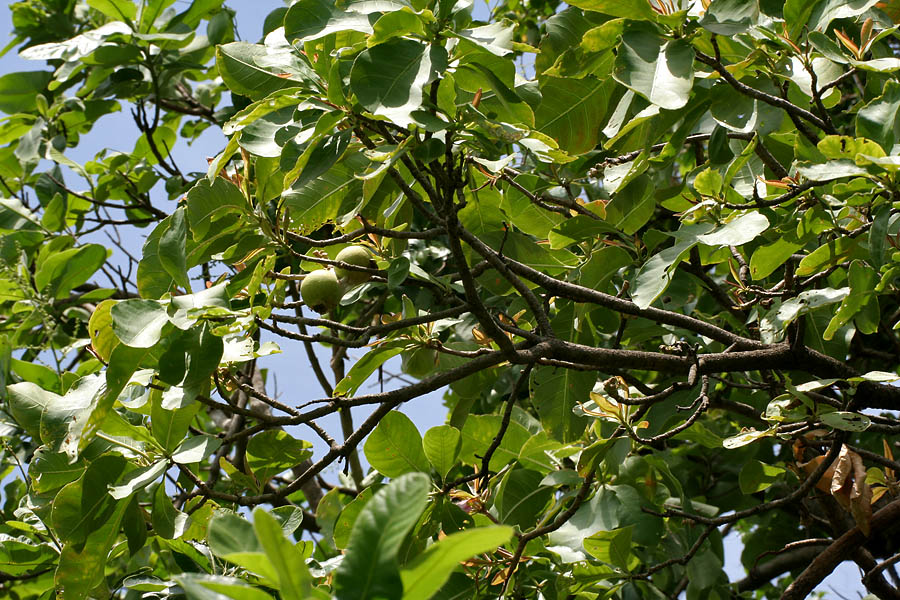
Careya arborea in Narsapur, Medak district, India

The Lecythidaceae (/ˌlɛsɪθɪˈdeɪsiː/ LESS-ith-ih-DAY-see) comprise a family of about 30 genera and 250–300 species of woody plants native to tropical South America, Africa (including Madagascar), Asia and Australia.

Well known members of the family include the cannonball tree (Couroupita guianensis) and the edible Brazil nut (Bertholletia excelsa).

== Genera ==
30 genera are currently accepted.

- Allantoma Miers
- Asteranthos Desf.
- Barringtonia J.R.Forst. & G.Forst.
- Bertholletia Bonpl.
- Brazzeia Baill.
- Careya Roxb.
- Cariniana Casar.
- Chydenanthus Miers
- Chytroma Miers
- Corythophora R.Knuth
- Couratari Aubl.
- Couroupita Aubl.
- Crateranthus Baker f.
- Eschweilera Mart. ex DC.
- Foetidia Comm. ex Lam.
- Grias L.
- Guaiania O.M.Vargas & C.W.Dick
- Gustavia L.
- Imbiriba O.M.Vargas, M.Ribeiro & C.W.Dick
- Lecythis Loefl.
- Napoleonaea P.Beauv.
- Oubanguia Baill.
- Pachylecythis Ledoux
- Petersianthus Merr.
- Pierrina Engl.
- Planchonia Blume
- Rhaptopetalum Oliv.
- Scottmoria Cornejo
- Scytopetalum Pierre ex Engl.
- Waimiria C.W.Dick & O.M.Vargas

== Taxonomy ==
According to molecular analysis of Lecythidaceae, including work by Mori et al. (2007), subfamilies include:

=== Barringtonioideae ===
Previously Barringtoniaceae; also sensu Takhtajan 1997; this subfamily was also called Planchonioideae (which included Barringtonia). Genera are restricted to the Old World tropics.

- Barringtonia J.R.Forst. & G.Forst. (synonym Abdulmajidia Whitmore)
- Careya Roxb.
- Chydenanthus Miers
- Petersianthus Merr.
- Planchonia Blume

=== Foetidioideae ===
Previously Foetidiaceae from Madagascar is monogeneric:

- Foetidia Comm. ex Lam.

=== Lecythidoideae ===
Genera restricted to the New World tropics.

- Allantoma Miers
- Bertholletia Bonpl.
- Cariniana Casar.
- Chytroma Miers
- Corythophora R.Knuth
- Couratari Aubl.
- Couroupita Aubl.
- Eschweilera Mart. ex DC.
- Grias L.
- Guaiania O.M.Vargas & C.W.Dick
- Gustavia L.
- Imbiriba O.M.Vargas, M.Ribeiro & C.W.Dick
- Lecythis Loefl.
- Pachylecythis Ledoux
- Scottmoria Cornejo
- Waimiria C.W.Dick & O.M.Vargas

=== Scytopetaloideae ===
The APG II system of 2003 included genera from the family Scytopetalaceae and others

- Asteranthos Desf., also as Asteranthaceae
- Brazzeia Verc.
- Oubanguia Baill.
- Pierrina Engl.
- Rhaptopetalum Oliv.
- Scytopetalum Engl.

=== Napoleonaeoideae ===
Previously as family Napoleonaeaceae; species are native to Africa.

- Crateranthus Baker f., incertae sedis according to Takhtajan,
- Napoleonaea P.Beauv.
