= Barringtonia lanceolata =

Scientific classification
- Kingdom: Plantae
- Clade: Tracheophytes
- Clade: Angiosperms
- Clade: Eudicots
- Clade: Asterids
- Order: Ericales
- Family: Lecythidaceae
- Genus: Barringtonia
- Species: B. lanceolata

Binomial name
- Barringtonia lanceolata (Ridl.) Payens

Synonyms
- Careya lanceolata Ridl.; Planchonia lanceolata (Ridl.) R.Knuth

Species of tree

Barringtonia lanceolata grows as a tree up to 30 metres (100 ft) tall, with a trunk diameter of up to 60 centimetres (24 in). The bark is brown, grey or reddish brown and has been used as fish poison. The fruits are ovoid or fusiform, up to 10.5 cm (4 in) long. Habitat is forest from sea level to 1,700 metres (5,600 ft) altitude. B. lanceolata is endemic to Borneo.
