= Barringtonia reticulata =

Conservation status
- Least Concern (IUCN 3.1)

Scientific classification
- Kingdom: Plantae
- Clade: Embryophytes
- Clade: Tracheophytes
- Clade: Angiosperms
- Clade: Eudicots
- Clade: Asterids
- Order: Ericales
- Family: Lecythidaceae
- Genus: Barringtonia
- Species: B. reticulata

Binomial name
- Barringtonia reticulata (Blume) Miq.

Synonyms
- Barringtonia gitingensis Elmer; Barringtonia linggaensis R.Knuth; Barringtonia sumatrana Miq.; Doxomma sumatranum (Miq.) Miers; Michelia reticulata (Blume) Kuntze; Stravadium reticulatum Blume

Species of plant

Barringtonia reticulata is a plant in the family Lecythidaceae. The specific epithet reticulata means 'like a network', referring to the leaf veins.

== Description ==
Barringtonia reticulata grows as a shrub or small tree up to 10 metres (30 ft) tall, with a trunk diameter of up to 20 cm (8 in). The bark is grey.

== Distribution and habitat ==
Barringtonia reticulata is native to the Andaman and Nicobar Islands, Peninsular Malaysia, Singapore, Sumatra, Borneo, Sulawesi and the Philippines. Its habitat is heath, swamp and beach forest.
