= Gnathmocerodes tonsoria =

Scientific classification
- Kingdom: Animalia
- Phylum: Arthropoda
- Class: Insecta
- Order: Lepidoptera
- Family: Tortricidae
- Genus: Gnathmocerodes
- Species: G. tonsoria

Binomial name
- Gnathmocerodes tonsoria Meyrick, 1909

Species of moth

Gnathmocerodes tonsoria is a moth of the family Tortricidae first described by Edward Meyrick in 1909. It is found in Sri Lanka.

Its larval food plant is Barringtonia racemosa.
