= Barringtonia hallieri =

Scientific classification
- Kingdom: Plantae
- Clade: Tracheophytes
- Clade: Angiosperms
- Clade: Eudicots
- Clade: Asterids
- Order: Ericales
- Family: Lecythidaceae
- Genus: Barringtonia
- Species: B. hallieri

Binomial name
- Barringtonia hallieri R.Knuth

Species of tree

Barringtonia hallieri grows as a small tree up to 5 metres (20 ft) tall, with a stem diameter of up to 6 centimetres (2 in). The fruits are oblong to banana-shaped, up to 14 cm (6 in) long. Habitat is riverine and mixed dipterocarp forests from sea-level to 900 metres (3,000 ft) altitude. B. hallieri is endemic to Borneo.
