= Mango-pine =

Mango-pine is a common name for several trees of the genus Barringtonia, which are flowering plants unrelated to actual pines, and may refer to:

- Barringtonia acutangula
- Barringtonia asiatica
- Barringtonia racemosa
