= Gnathmocerodes lecythocera =

Scientific classification
- Kingdom: Animalia
- Phylum: Arthropoda
- Class: Insecta
- Order: Lepidoptera
- Family: Tortricidae
- Genus: Gnathmocerodes
- Species: G. lecythocera

Binomial name
- Gnathmocerodes lecythocera (Meyrick, 1937)

Synonyms
- Argyroploce lecythocera Meyrick, 1937; Argyroploce lecythophora Meyrick, 1939

Species of moth

Gnathmocerodes lecythocera is a moth of the family Tortricidae. It was described by Edward Meyrick in 1937. It is found on Java and Fiji.

The larvae feed on the leaves and fruits of Barringtonia species, the leaves of Annonaceae species and the fruits of Urena lobata.
