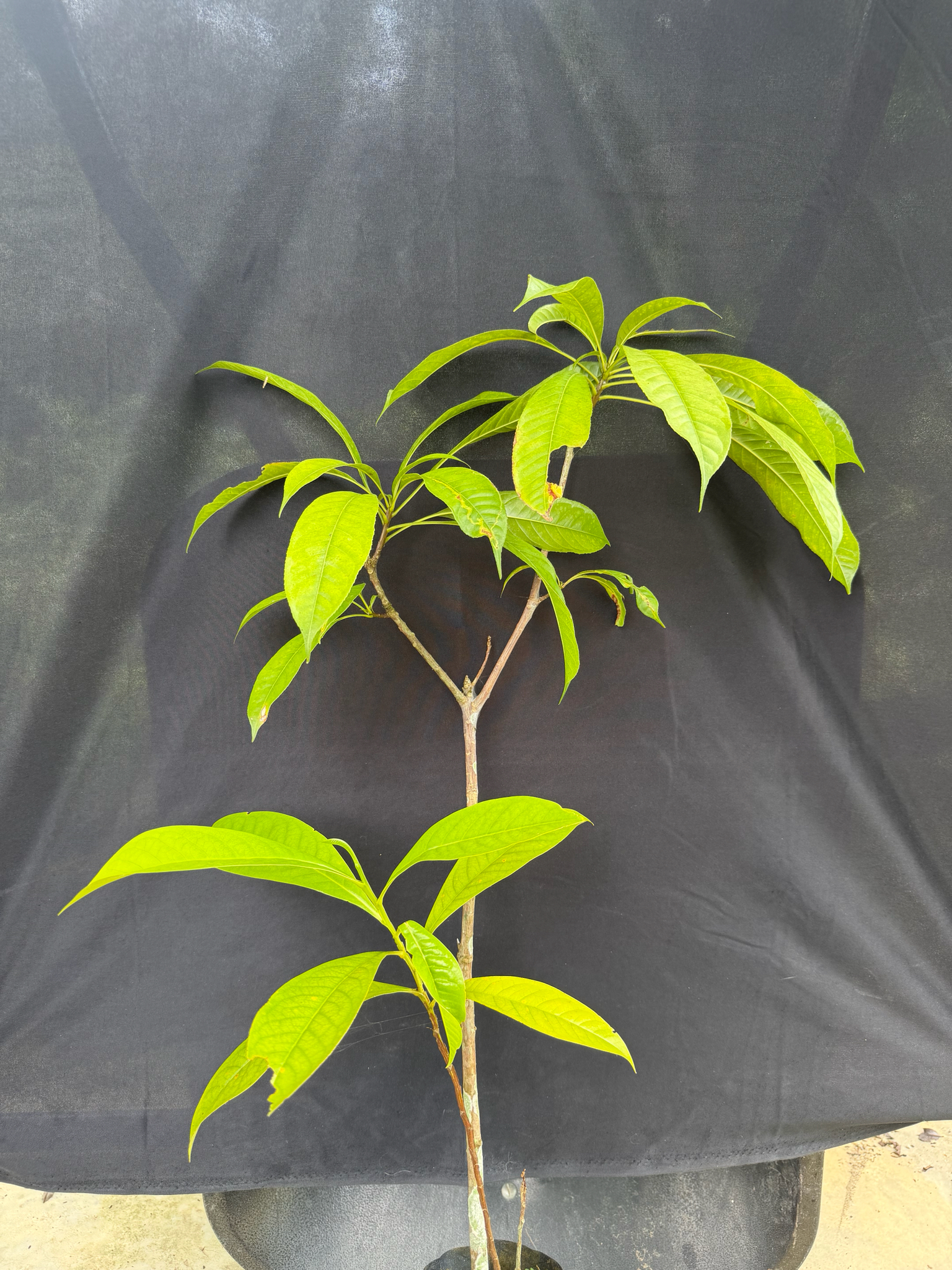
- In Malaysia

Conservation status
- Least Concern (IUCN 3.1)

Scientific classification
- Kingdom: Plantae
- Clade: Embryophytes
- Clade: Tracheophytes
- Clade: Spermatophytes
- Clade: Angiosperms
- Clade: Eudicots
- Clade: Asterids
- Order: Ericales
- Family: Lecythidaceae
- Genus: Barringtonia
- Species: B. macrostachya

Binomial name
- Barringtonia macrostachya (Jack) Kurz

Synonyms
- List: Baranda angatensis Llanos; Barringtonia acuminata Korth.; Barringtonia annamica Gagnep.; Barringtonia balabacensis Merr.; Barringtonia cochinchinensis (Blume) Merr. ex Gagnep.; Barringtonia craibiana R.Knuth; Barringtonia cylindrostachya Griff.; Barringtonia fusicarpa Hu; Barringtonia isabelaensis R.Knuth; Barringtonia moluccana R.Knuth; Barringtonia olivacea R.Knuth; Barringtonia pendens R.Knuth; Barringtonia wallichiana R.Knuth; Careya macrostachya Jack; Doxomma acuminatum (Korth.) Miers; Doxomma cochinchinense (Blume) Miers; Doxomma cylindrostachyum (Griff.) Miers; Doxomma macrostachyum (Jack) Miers; Michelia acuminata (Korth.) Kuntze; Michelia macrostachya (Jack) Kuntze; Stravadium acuminatum (Korth.) Blume; Stravadium cochinchinense Blume

= Barringtonia macrostachya =

Species of plant

Barringtonia macrostachya grows as a shrub or tree up to 30 metres (100 ft) tall, with a trunk diameter of up to 95 centimetres (37 in). The bark is brown, greenish yellow, greyish brown or brown mottled grey. The fruits are obovoid, up to 9 cm (4 in) long. The specific epithet macrostachya is from the Greek meaning 'large spike', referring to the inflorescence. Its habitat is riverine and swamp forest, from sea level to 1,300 metres (4,300 ft) altitude. Local medicinal uses include the treatment of ringworm, sore eyes and stomach aches. Barringtonia macrostachya has been used as fish poison. It is found in China, Burma, Thailand, Vietnam, Malaysia, Brunei, Indonesia and the Philippines.
