= Barringtonia havilandii =

Scientific classification
- Kingdom: Plantae
- Clade: Tracheophytes
- Clade: Angiosperms
- Clade: Eudicots
- Clade: Asterids
- Order: Ericales
- Family: Lecythidaceae
- Genus: Barringtonia
- Species: B. havilandii

Binomial name
- Barringtonia havilandii Ridl.

Synonyms
- Barringtonia baramensis R.Knuth

Species of tree

Barringtonia havilandii is a tree of the Lecythidaceae family endemic to Borneo. Its habitat is inland riverine forests.
