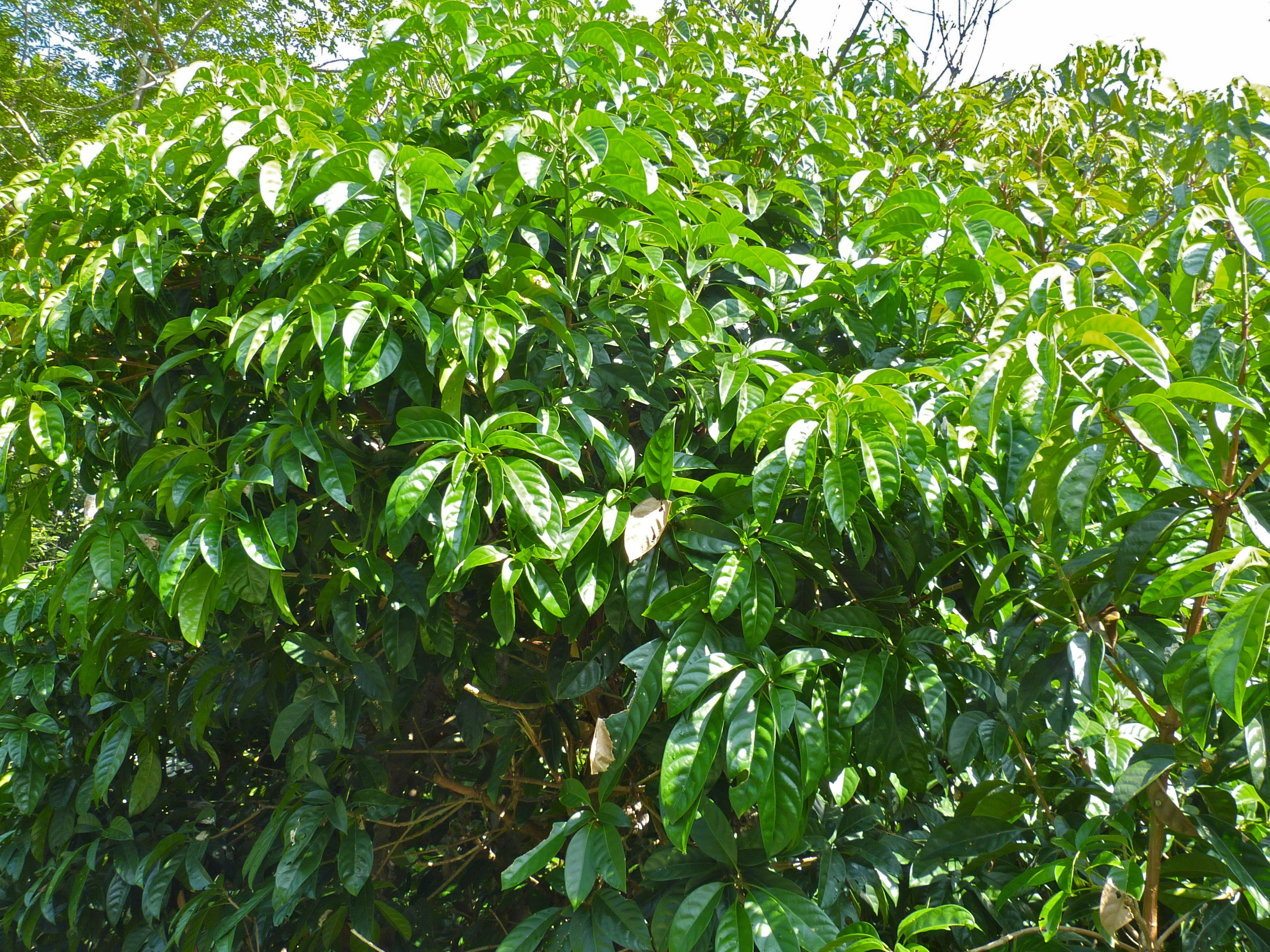

Scientific classification
- Kingdom: Plantae
- Clade: Tracheophytes
- Clade: Angiosperms
- Clade: Eudicots
- Clade: Asterids
- Order: Ericales
- Family: Lecythidaceae
- Genus: Barringtonia
- Species: B. ashtonii

Binomial name
- Barringtonia ashtonii Payens

= Barringtonia ashtonii =

Species of tree

Barringtonia ashtonii is a tree in the family Lecythidaceae.

== Description ==
Barringtonia ashtonii grows as a tree up to 17 metres (60 ft) tall, with a trunk diameter of up to 45 centimetres (18 in). The bark is brown. The fruits are ovoid, up to 5 cm (2 in) long.

== Distribution and habitat ==
Barringtonia ashtonii is endemic to Borneo. Its habitat is riverine mixed dipterocarp forests.
