= Barringtonia sarcostachys =

Scientific classification
- Kingdom: Plantae
- Clade: Tracheophytes
- Clade: Angiosperms
- Clade: Eudicots
- Clade: Asterids
- Order: Ericales
- Family: Lecythidaceae
- Genus: Barringtonia
- Species: B. sarcostachys

Binomial name
- Barringtonia sarcostachys (Blume) Miq.

Synonyms
- Doxomma sarcostachys (Blume) Miers; Stravadium sarcostachys Blume

Species of tree

Barringtonia sarcostachys grows as a tree up to 40 metres (130 ft) tall, with a trunk diameter of up to 50 centimetres (20 in). The bark is brown, reddish brown, grey, greenish brown or blackish. The fruits are ovoid to roundish, up to 11 cm (4 in) long. The specific epithet sarcostachys is from the Greek meaning 'fleshy spike', referring to the inflorescence. Its habitat is lowland mixed dipterocarp forest from sea level to 300 metres (1,000 ft) altitude. B. sarcostachys is found in Sumatra and Borneo.
