= Barringtonia curranii =

Scientific classification
- Kingdom: Plantae
- Clade: Tracheophytes
- Clade: Angiosperms
- Clade: Eudicots
- Clade: Asterids
- Order: Ericales
- Family: Lecythidaceae
- Genus: Barringtonia
- Species: B. curranii

Binomial name
- Barringtonia curranii Merr.

Synonyms
- Barringtonia rhodochlamys Airy Shaw

Species of tree

Barringtonia curranii grows as a tree up to 25 metres (80 ft) tall, with a trunk diameter of up to 40 centimetres (16 in). The bark is grey, greyish green or dark brown. The fruits are ovoid, up to 11 cm (4 in) long. Habitat is forest from sea level to 1,700 metres (5,600 ft) altitude.

B. curranii is found in Borneo and Palawan.
