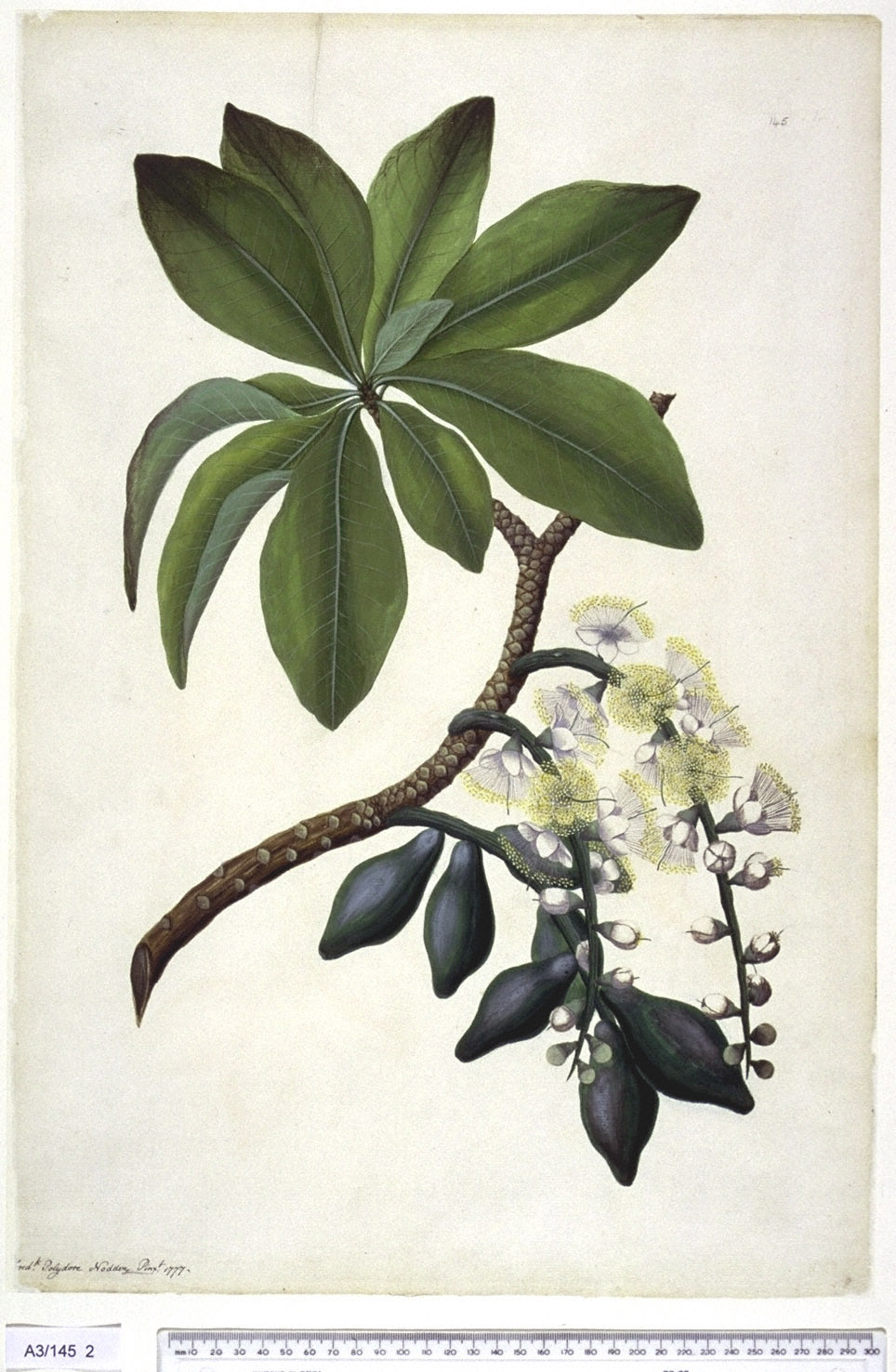
- illustration circa 1798 by Frederick Polydore Nodder

Conservation status
- Least Concern (IUCN 3.1)

Scientific classification
- Kingdom: Plantae
- Clade: Tracheophytes
- Clade: Angiosperms
- Clade: Eudicots
- Clade: Asterids
- Order: Ericales
- Family: Lecythidaceae
- Genus: Barringtonia
- Species: B. calyptrata

Binomial name
- Barringtonia calyptrata (R.Br. ex Meirs) R.Br. ex F.M.Bailey
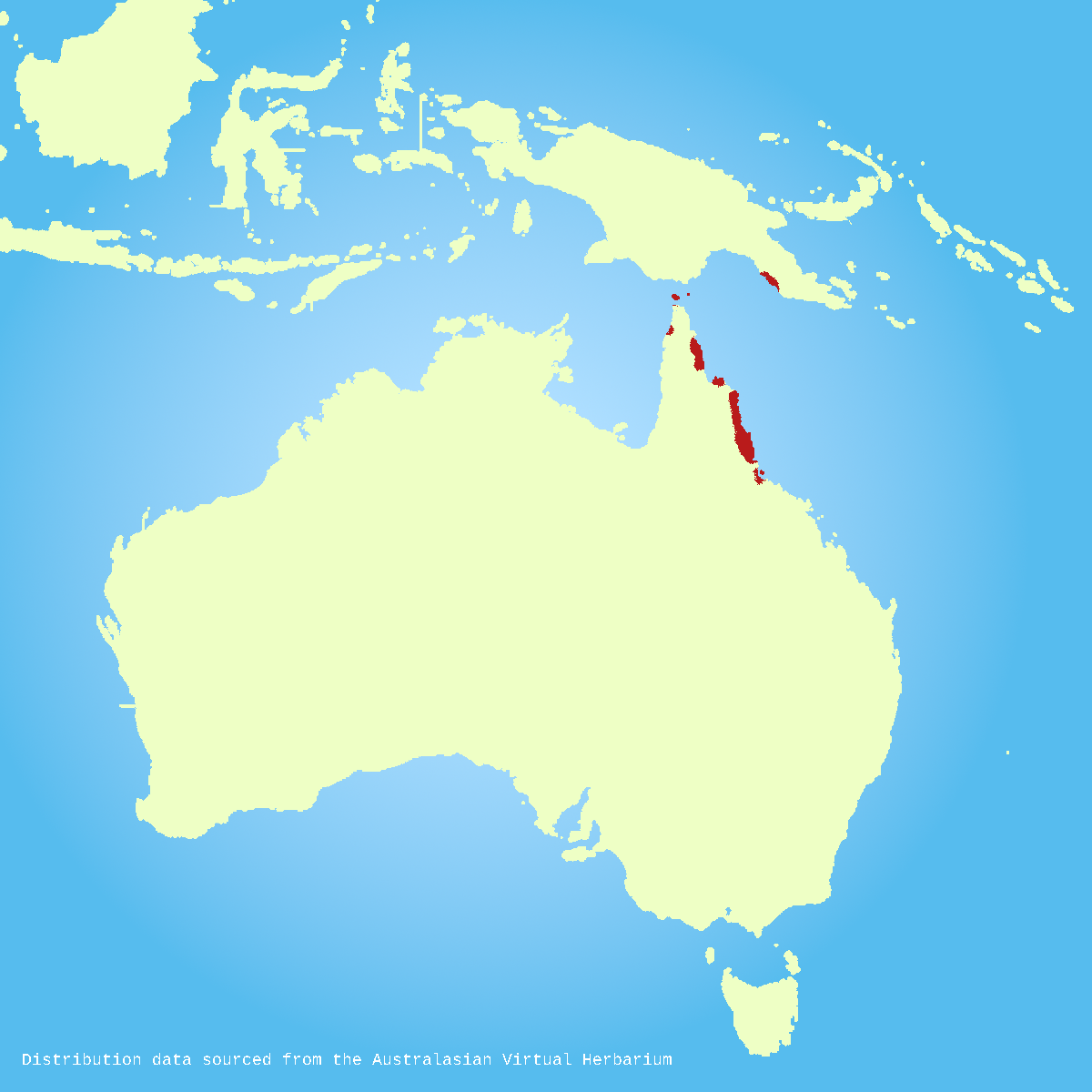

Synonyms
- Homotypic Synonyms: Butonica calyptrata R.Br. ex Miers; Huttum calyptratum (R.Br. ex Miers) Britten; Michelia calyptrata (R.Br. ex Miers) Kuntze; Heterotypic Synonyms: Barringtonia flava Lauterb.

= Barringtonia calyptrata =

Species of tree

Barringtonia calyptrata is a species of mangrove belonging to the family Lecythidaceae. It is sometimes referred to by the common name corned beef wood. It is native to New Guinea and to northern Queensland, Australia.

== Gallery ==
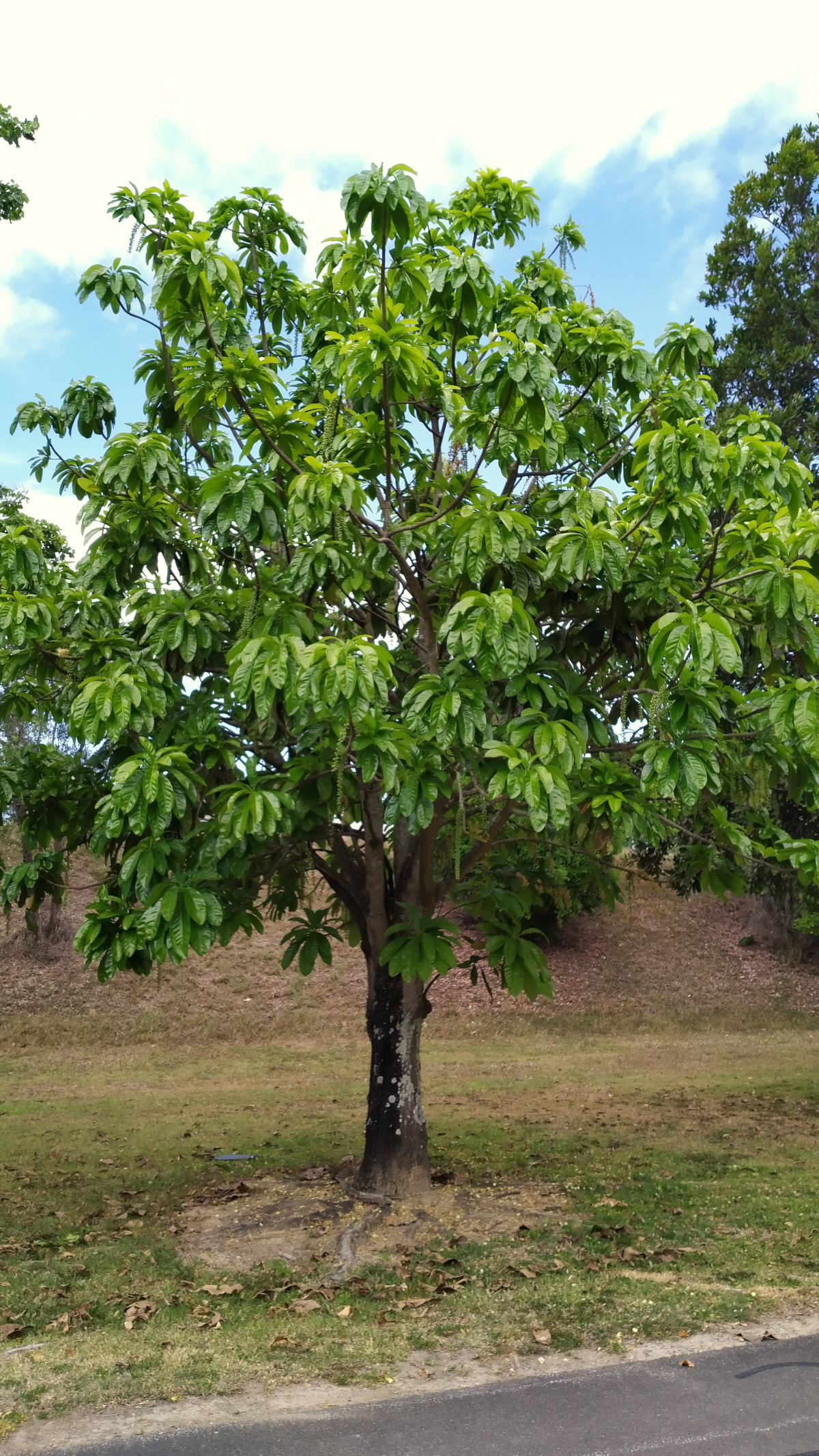
Tree growing in Redlynch, Queensland, Australia

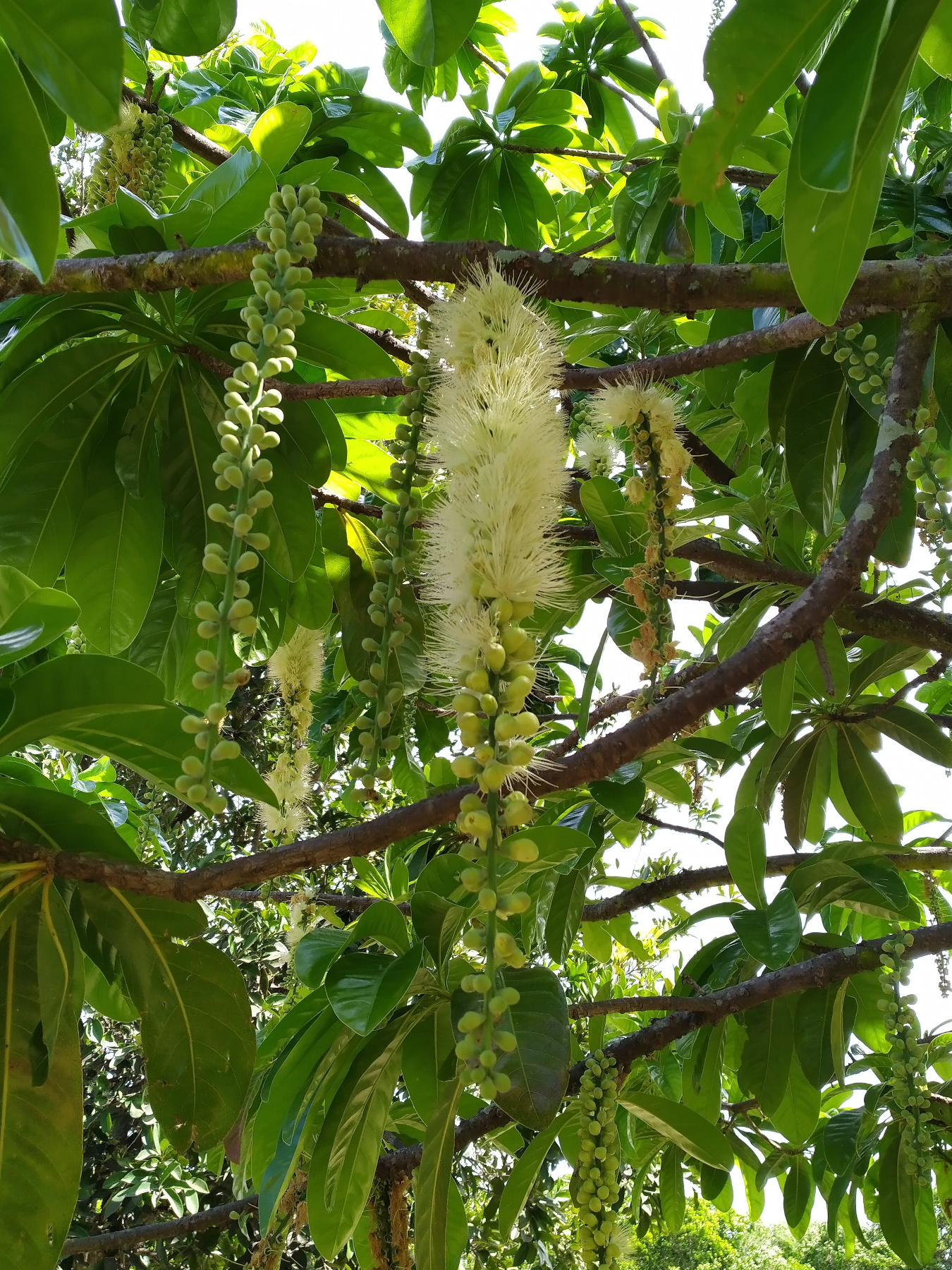
Flowers

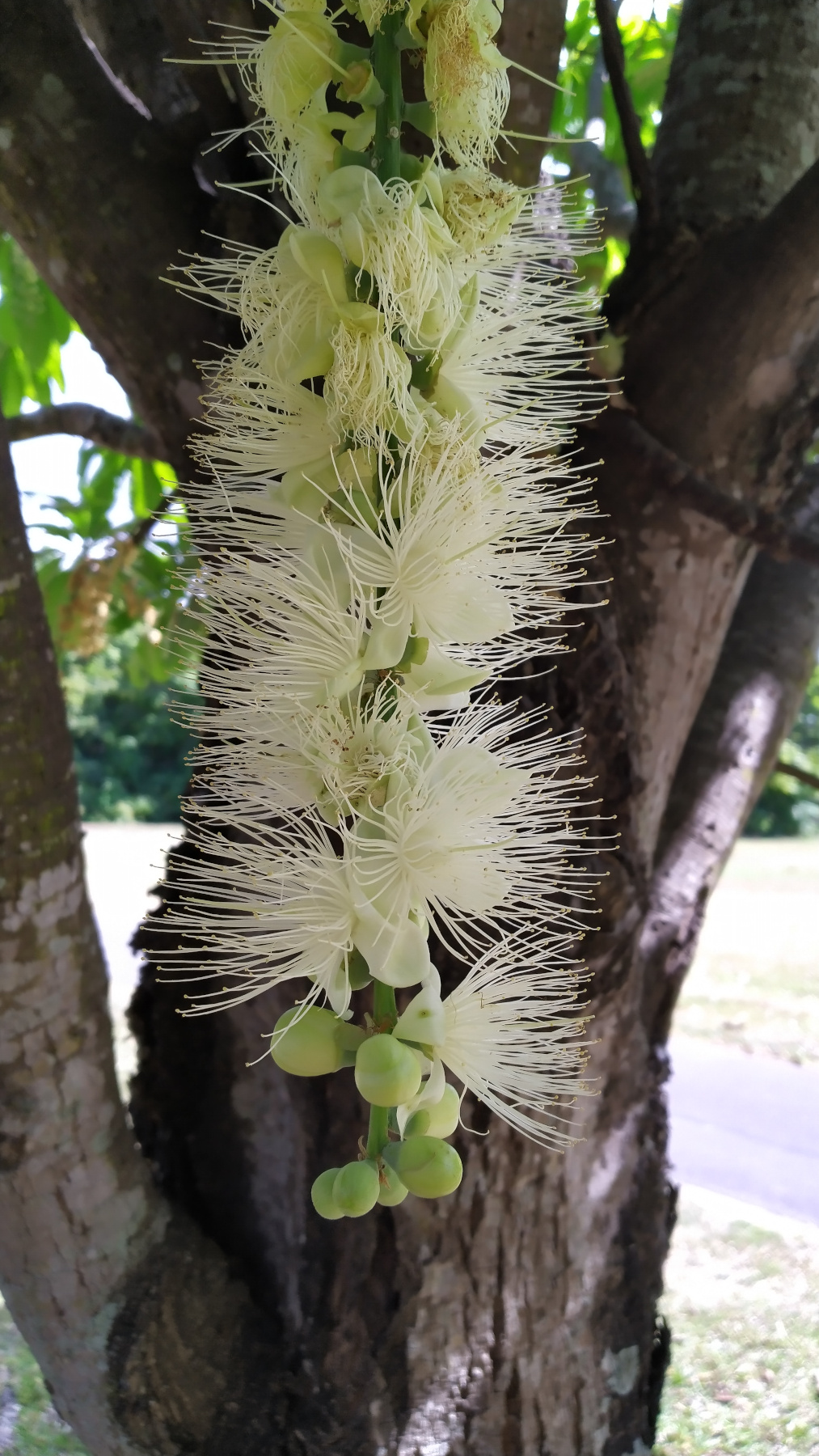
Flowers

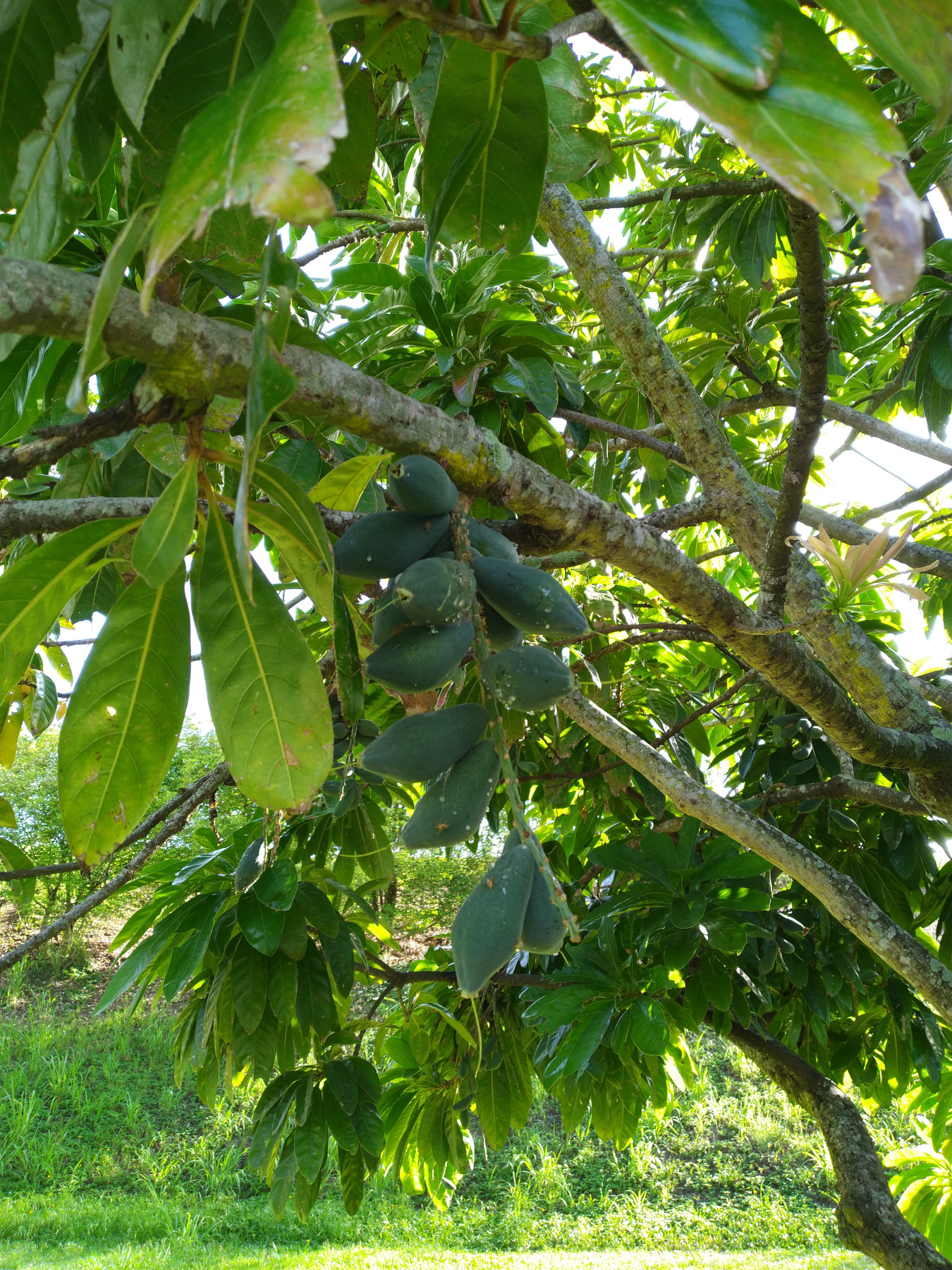
Fruits

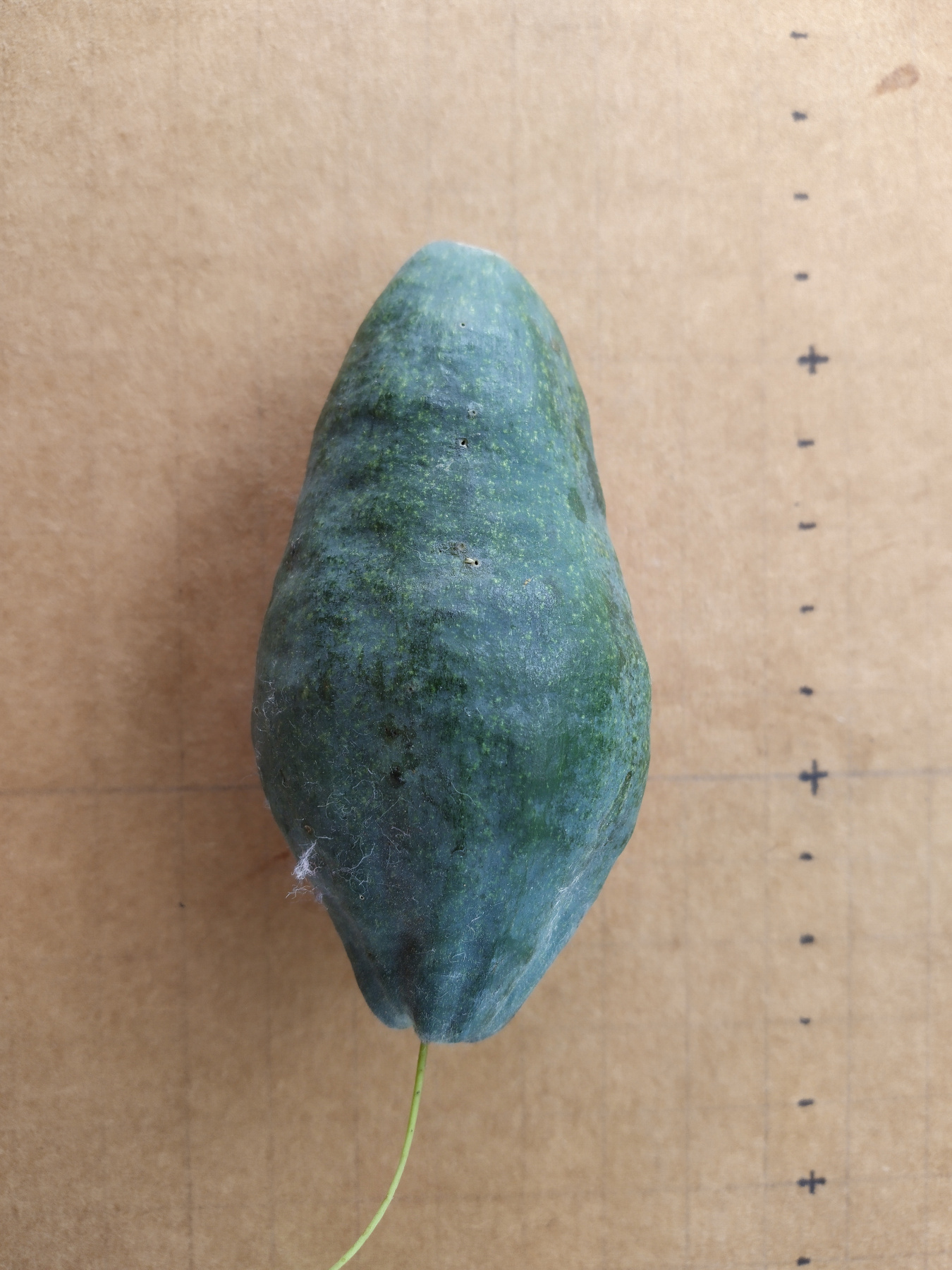
Fruit (scale bar 1 cm intervals)
