= Barringtonia chaniana =

Conservation status
- Vulnerable (IUCN 2.3)

Scientific classification
- Kingdom: Plantae
- Clade: Tracheophytes
- Clade: Angiosperms
- Clade: Eudicots
- Clade: Asterids
- Order: Ericales
- Family: Lecythidaceae
- Genus: Barringtonia
- Species: B. chaniana

Binomial name
- Barringtonia chaniana (Whitmore) Prance

Synonyms
- Abdulmajidia chaniana Whitmore

Species of tree

Barringtonia chaniana is a species of woody plant in the family Lecythidaceae. It is found only in Pahang and Johor in Malaysia. It is found in lowlands and hill forests up to 570 m and is threatened by habitat loss.
