= Barringtonia maxwelliana =

Conservation status
- Vulnerable (IUCN 2.3)

Scientific classification
- Kingdom: Plantae
- Clade: Tracheophytes
- Clade: Angiosperms
- Clade: Eudicots
- Clade: Asterids
- Order: Ericales
- Family: Lecythidaceae
- Genus: Barringtonia
- Species: B. maxwelliana

Binomial name
- Barringtonia maxwelliana (Whitmore) Prance

Synonyms
- Abdulmajidia maxwelliana Whitmore

Species of tree

Barringtonia maxwelliana is a species of woody plant in the Lecythidaceae family. It is endemic to Bukit Larut (Maxwell Hill) in Perak, Malaysia. It can be found on steep ridges and hillsides in submontane forests, at about 600 m. It is threatened by habitat loss.
