= Barringtonia revoluta =

Scientific classification
- Kingdom: Plantae
- Clade: Tracheophytes
- Clade: Angiosperms
- Clade: Eudicots
- Clade: Asterids
- Order: Ericales
- Family: Lecythidaceae
- Genus: Barringtonia
- Species: B. revoluta

Binomial name
- Barringtonia revoluta Merr.

Synonyms
- Barringtonia flagellata Lütjeh. & Ooststr.

Species of tree

Barringtonia revoluta grows as a tree up to 33 metres (108 ft) tall, with a trunk diameter of up to 50 centimetres (20 in). The bark is pale brown. The specific epithet revoluta is from the Latin meaning 'rolled back', referring to the leaves. Its habitat is forests from sea level to 200 metres (660 ft) altitude. B. revoluta is found in Malaysia, Brunei, Indonesia and the Philippines.
