= Barringtonia longisepala =

Scientific classification
- Kingdom: Plantae
- Clade: Tracheophytes
- Clade: Angiosperms
- Clade: Eudicots
- Clade: Asterids
- Order: Ericales
- Family: Lecythidaceae
- Genus: Barringtonia
- Species: B. longisepala

Binomial name
- Barringtonia longisepala Payens

Species of tree

Barringtonia longisepala grows as a tree up to 21 metres (69 ft) tall, with a trunk diameter of up to 35 centimetres (14 in). Bark is dark grey or greyish brown. Flowers are yellow. Fruit is oblong, up to 14 centimetres (5.5 in) long. Habitat is hillside and swamp forests. B. longisepala is endemic to Borneo.
