= Barringtonia fusicarpa =

Scientific classification
- Kingdom: Plantae
- Clade: Tracheophytes
- Clade: Angiosperms
- Clade: Eudicots
- Clade: Asterids
- Order: Ericales
- Family: Lecythidaceae
- Genus: Barringtonia
- Species: B. fusicarpa

Binomial name
- Barringtonia fusicarpa Hu

Synonyms
- Barringtonia yunnanensis Hu

Species of flowering plant

Barringtonia fusicarpa is a species of plant in the Brazil nut family Lecythidaceae. It is native to China.
