= Barringtonia scortechinii =

Scientific classification
- Kingdom: Plantae
- Clade: Tracheophytes
- Clade: Angiosperms
- Clade: Eudicots
- Clade: Asterids
- Order: Ericales
- Family: Lecythidaceae
- Genus: Barringtonia
- Species: B. scortechinii

Binomial name
- Barringtonia scortechinii King

Synonyms
- Barringtonia scortechinii var. globosa Craib

Species of tree

Barringtonia scortechinii is a species of flowering plant in the family Lecythidaceae. It grows as a tree up to 40 metres (130 ft) tall, with a trunk diameter of up to 40 centimetres (16 in). The bark is brown or red. Fruit is winged, up to 12 centimetres (4.7 in) long. Habitat is mixed dipterocarp forest from sea-level to 1,400 metres (4,600 ft) altitude. B. scortechinii is found in Thailand, Malaysia, Brunei and Indonesia.
