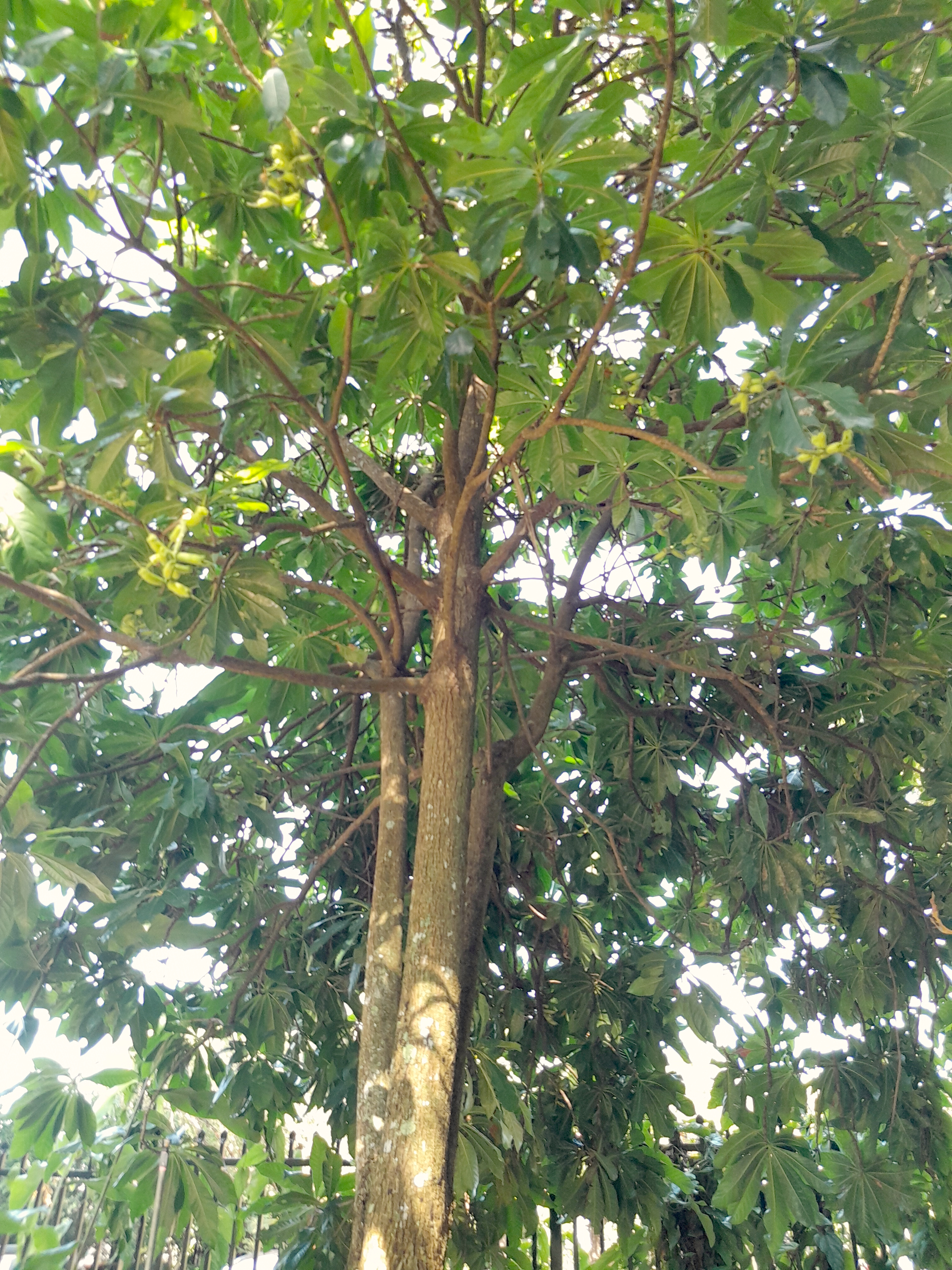
- Cultivated tree in Cairns Botanic Gardens

Scientific classification
- Kingdom: Plantae
- Clade: Tracheophytes
- Clade: Angiosperms
- Clade: Eudicots
- Clade: Asterids
- Order: Ericales
- Family: Lecythidaceae
- Genus: Barringtonia
- Species: B. neocaledonica

Binomial name
- Barringtonia neocaledonica Vieill.

Synonyms
- Doxomma neocaledonicum (Vieill.) Miers; Michelia neocaledonica (Vieill.) Kuntze; Stravadium neocaledonicum (Vieill.) Baum.-Bod.

= Barringtonia neocaledonica =

Species of flowering plant

Barringtonia neocaledonica is a tree in the Brazil nut family Lecythidaceae which is endemic to New Caledonia.

== Description ==
Barringtonia neocaledonica is a small tree growing up to 15 m (49 ft) tall. The leaves are arranged in whorls and clustered towards the end of the branches. They are glossy dark green, glabrous (i.e. without hairs), wider at the distal end (obovate) and gradually tapering at the base. The leaf blade extends all the way down to the end of the petiole (leaf stalk), so that the petiole is "winged" (attenuate). The leaves measure up to 30 cm (12 in) long by 12 cm (4.7 in) wide.

The inflorescences are terminal or ramiflorous, pendulous spikes, reaching 50 cm (20 in) or more in length. They carry about 50 white or pale pink sessile flowers.

The fleshy fruit contains a single seed and measures about 6 cm (2.4 in) long and 2 cm (0.79 in) wide.

== Distribution and habitat ==
This species is endemic to New Caledonia, and is only found on the main island of New Caledonia, Grande Terre.

== Conservation ==
As of November 2023 its conservation status has not been assessed by the International Union for Conservation of Nature (IUCN).

== Gallery ==
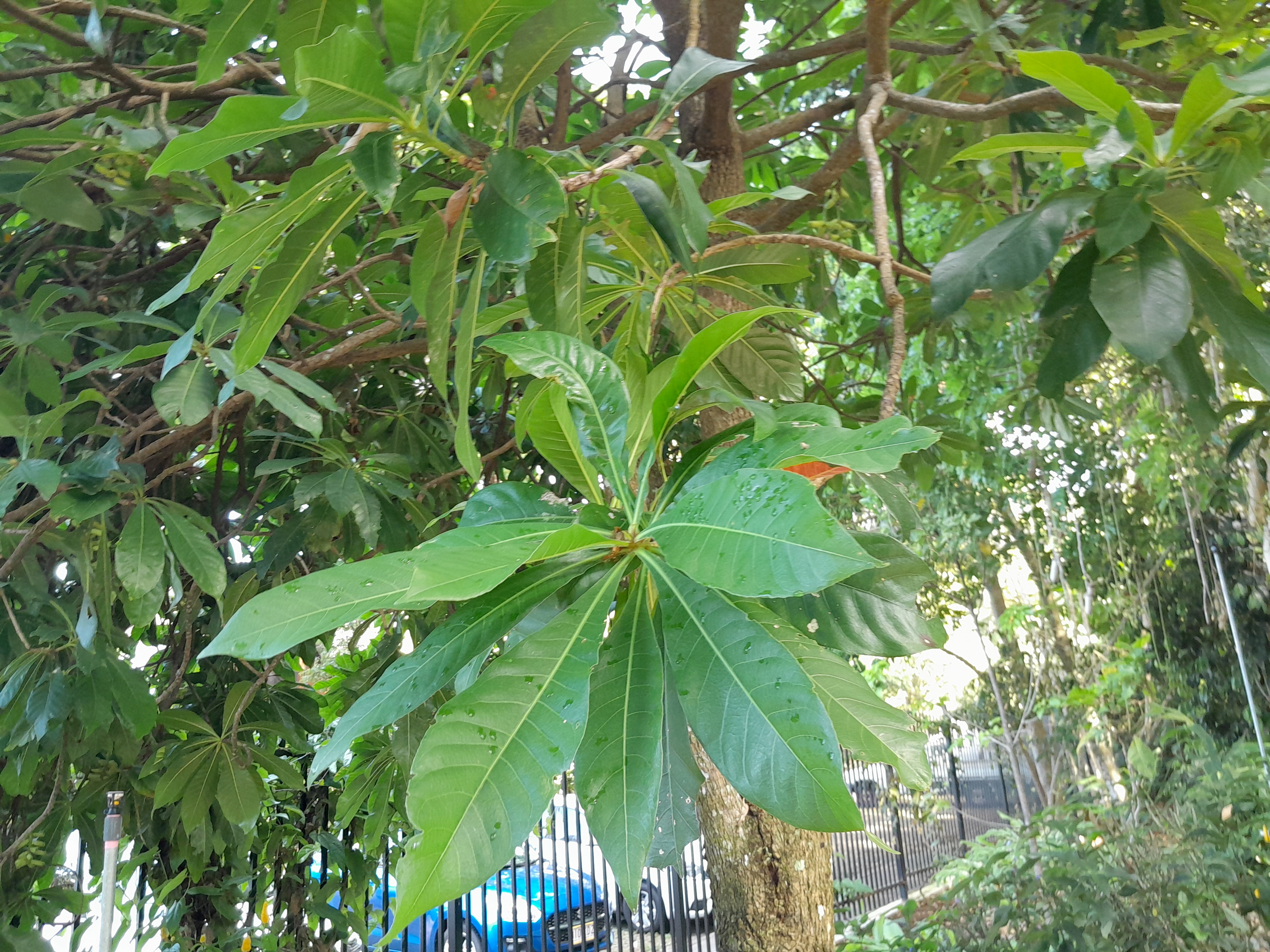
Foliage

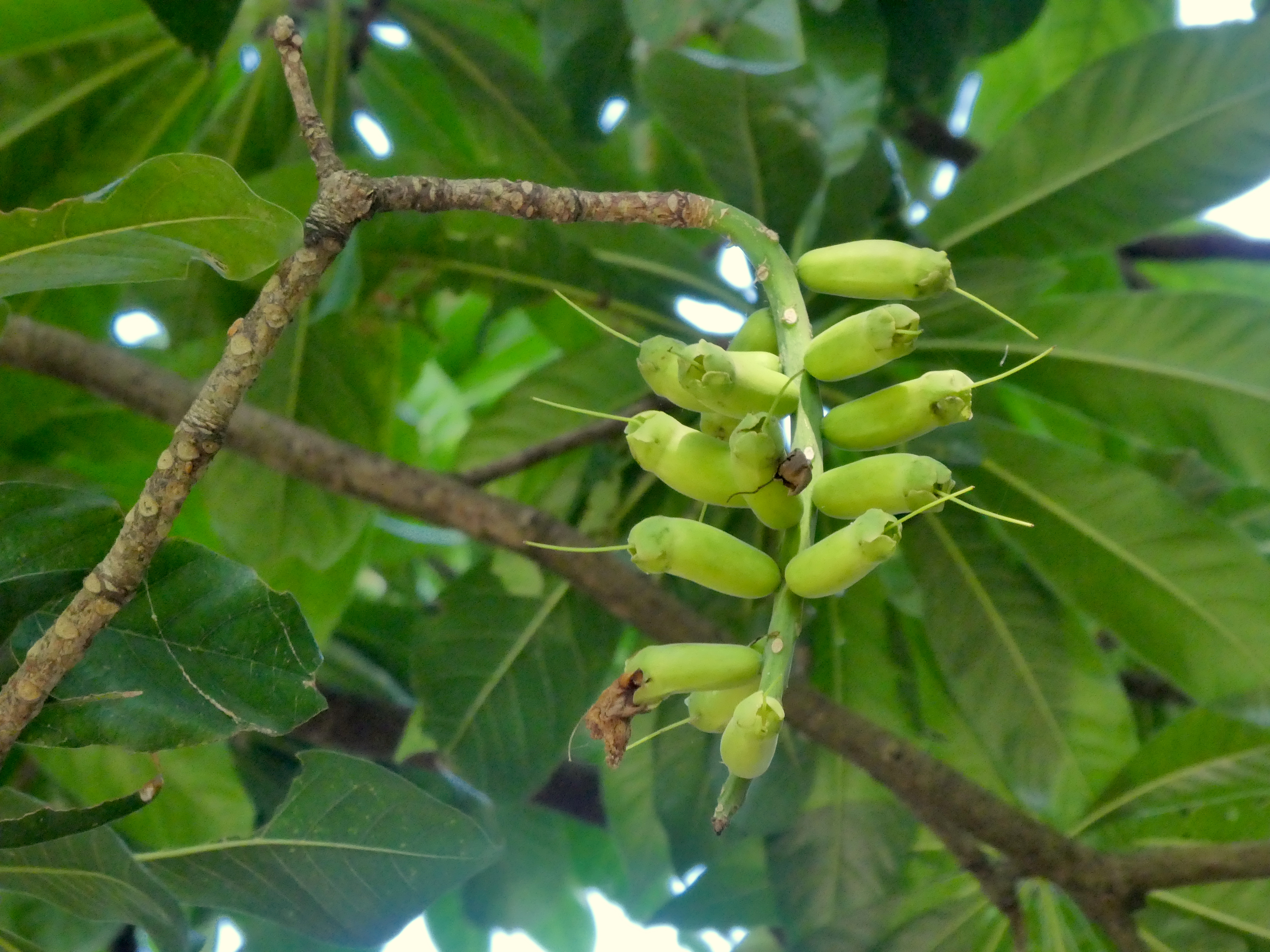
Developing fruit

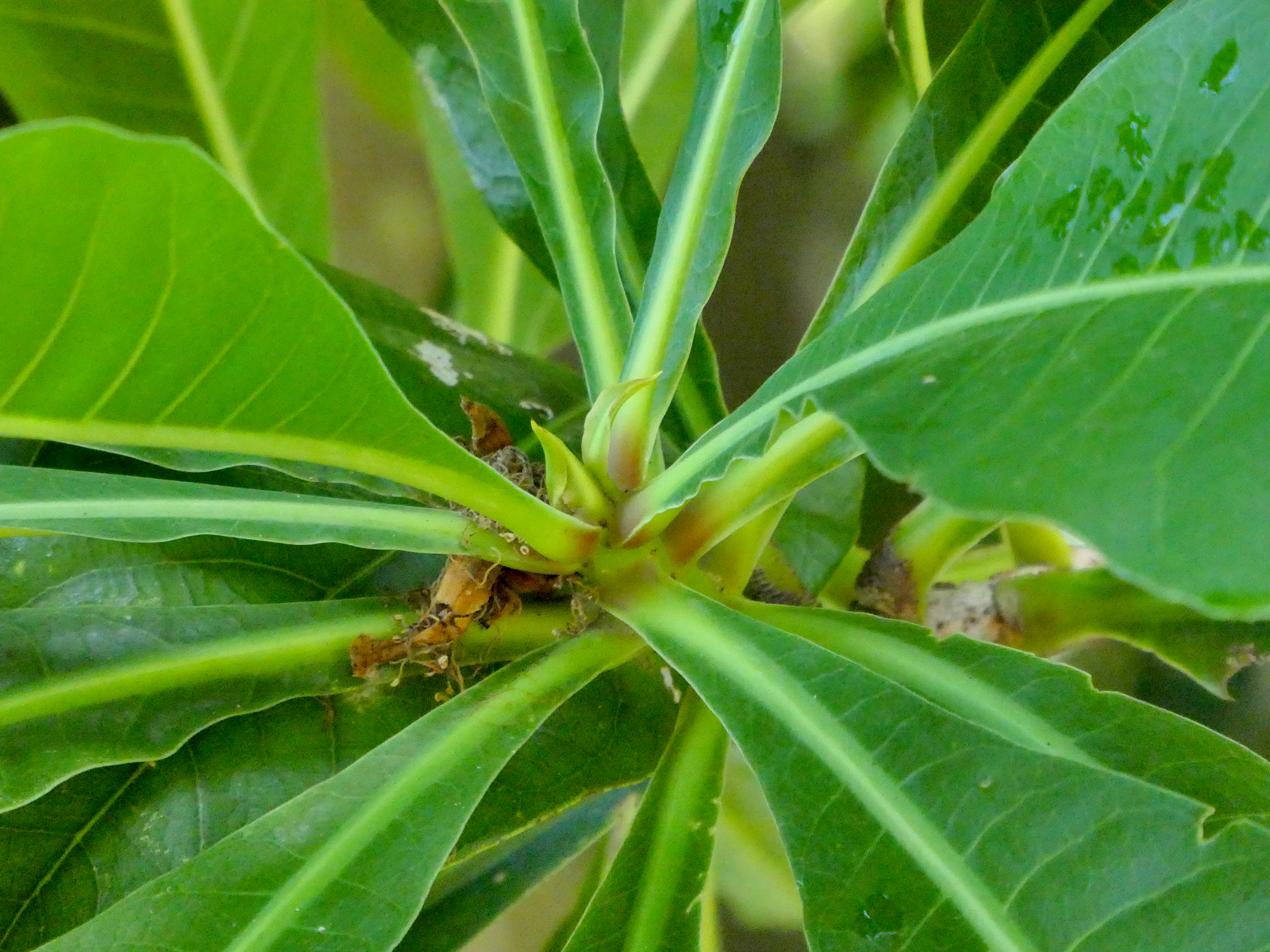
Close up of showing leaves in whorls

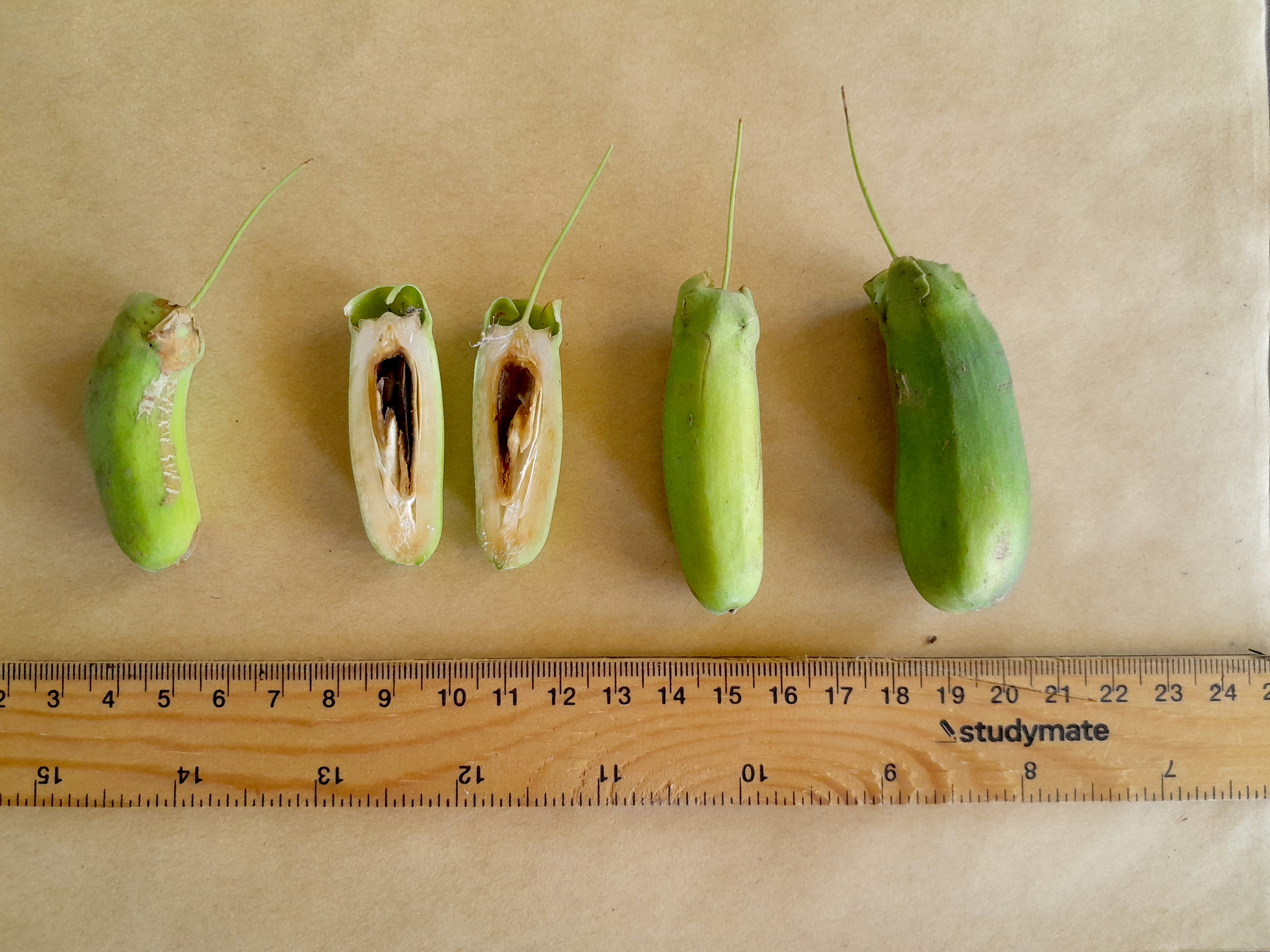
Immature, aborted fruit
