= Barringtonia sarawakensis =

Conservation status
- Endangered (IUCN 3.1)

Scientific classification
- Kingdom: Plantae
- Clade: Embryophytes
- Clade: Tracheophytes
- Clade: Angiosperms
- Clade: Eudicots
- Clade: Asterids
- Order: Ericales
- Family: Lecythidaceae
- Genus: Barringtonia
- Species: B. sarawakensis

Binomial name
- Barringtonia sarawakensis Chantar.

Species of plant

Barringtonia sarawakensis is a plant in the family Lecythidaceae.

== Description ==
Barringtonia sarawakensis grows as a tree up to 30 metres (100 ft) tall, with a trunk diameter of up to 30 centimetres (12 in). Its bark is light to reddish brown. The fruits are green, ovoid to oblong, up to 4 cm (2 in) long.

== Distribution and habitat ==
Barringtonia sarawakensis is endemic to Borneo where it is confined to Sarawak. Its habitat is hill dipterocarp forest at 400–1,000 m (1,000–3,000 ft) altitude.

== Conservation ==
Barringtonia sarawakensis has been assessed as endangered on the IUCN Red List. The species is threatened by logging and harvesting for timber. Habitat loss from clearing for agriculture is also a threat.
