= Gnathmocerodes =

Scientific classification
- Kingdom: Animalia
- Phylum: Arthropoda
- Class: Insecta
- Order: Lepidoptera
- Family: Tortricidae
- Subfamily: Olethreutinae
- Tribe: Olethreutini
- Genus: Gnathmocerodes; Diakonoff, 1968

Genus of tortrix moths

Gnathmocerodes is a genus of moths belonging to the subfamily Olethreutinae of the family Tortricidae.

== Species ==
- Gnathmocerodes alphestis (Meyrick, 1922)
- Gnathmocerodes euplectra (Lower, 1908)
- Gnathmocerodes labidophora Diakonoff, 1973
- Gnathmocerodes lecythocera (Meyrick, 1937)
- Gnathmocerodes ophiocosma (Turner, 1946)
- Gnathmocerodes petrifraga Diakonoff, 1968
- Gnathmocerodes tonsoria (Meyrick, 1909)
