= Barringtonia pterita =

Conservation status
- Near Threatened (IUCN 3.1)

Scientific classification
- Kingdom: Plantae
- Clade: Tracheophytes
- Clade: Angiosperms
- Clade: Eudicots
- Clade: Asterids
- Order: Ericales
- Family: Lecythidaceae
- Genus: Barringtonia
- Species: B. pterita

Binomial name
- Barringtonia pterita Merr.

Species of flowering plant

Barringtonia pterita is a flowering plant in the family Lecythidaceae. It is native to Southeast Asia.

== Description ==
Barringtonia pterita grows as a shrub or tree up to 10 m (30 ft) tall, with a stem diameter of up to 12 cm (5 in). The bark is black. The fruits are winged, up to 6 cm (2.4 in) long.

== Taxonomy ==
Barringtonia pterita was first described in 1914 by American botanist Elmer Drew Merrill in the Philippine Journal of Science. The type specimen was collected in Luzon in the Philippines. The specific epithet pterita means 'wing', referring to the winged fruit.

== Distribution and habitat ==
Barringtonia pterita is endemic to the Philippines. It is found in a variety of lowland habitats from 50–200 m (200–700 ft) altitude.

== Conservation ==
Barringtonia pterita has been assessed as near threatened on the IUCN Red List. The species' habitat is threatened by deforestation and by conversion of land for agriculture and urban development. The wood is harvested and is used in construction and for implements. The species is present in some protected areas including Northern Sierra Madre Natural Park, Peñablanca Protected Landscape and Quezon Protected Landscape.
