= Barringtonia conoidea =

Conservation status
- Least Concern (IUCN 3.1)

Scientific classification
- Kingdom: Plantae
- Clade: Embryophytes
- Clade: Tracheophytes
- Clade: Angiosperms
- Clade: Eudicots
- Clade: Asterids
- Order: Ericales
- Family: Lecythidaceae
- Genus: Barringtonia
- Species: B. conoidea

Binomial name
- Barringtonia conoidea Griff.

Synonyms
- Butonica alata Miers; Michelia conoidea (Griff.) Kuntze

Species of plant

Barringtonia conoidea is a plant in the family Lecythidaceae.

== Description ==
Barringtonia conoidea grows as a shrub or small tree up to 15 metres (50 ft) tall, with a trunk diameter of up to 15 cm (6 in). The fruits are conical, winged, up to 5 cm (2 in) long.

== Distribution and habitat ==
Barringtonia conoidea is native to Myanmar, Vietnam, Singapore, Peninsular Malaysia, Sumatra and Borneo. Its habitat is mangrove forest and along rivers.
