= Barringtonia pendula =

Scientific classification
- Kingdom: Plantae
- Clade: Tracheophytes
- Clade: Angiosperms
- Clade: Eudicots
- Clade: Asterids
- Order: Ericales
- Family: Lecythidaceae
- Genus: Barringtonia
- Species: B. pendula

Binomial name
- Barringtonia pendula (Griff.) Kurz

Synonyms
- Barringtonia musiformis King; Barringtonia yunnanensis Hu; Careya pendula Griff.; Doxomma pendulum (Griff.) Miers

Species of tree

Barringtonia pendula grows as a tree up to 47 metres (150 ft) tall, with a trunk diameter of up to 90 centimetres (35 in). The bark is reddish brown. The fruits are ovoid or musiform (banana-shaped), up to 15 cm (6 in) long. The specific epithet pendula is from the Latin meaning 'dangling', referring to the inflorescence. Its habitat is dipterocarp forest from sea-level to 1,200 metres (4,000 ft) altitude. B. pendula is found in China, Burma, Thailand, Sumatra, Peninsular Malaysia and Borneo.
