= Barringtonia payensiana =

Conservation status
- Vulnerable (IUCN 2.3)

Scientific classification
- Kingdom: Plantae
- Clade: Tracheophytes
- Clade: Angiosperms
- Clade: Eudicots
- Clade: Asterids
- Order: Ericales
- Family: Lecythidaceae
- Genus: Barringtonia
- Species: B. payensiana

Binomial name
- Barringtonia payensiana Whitm.

Species of flowering plant

Barringtonia payensiana is a species of woody plant in the Lecythidaceae family. B. payensiana is endemic to Peninsular Malaysia (perak, selangor) and is threatened by habitat loss due to Housing & urban areas.
