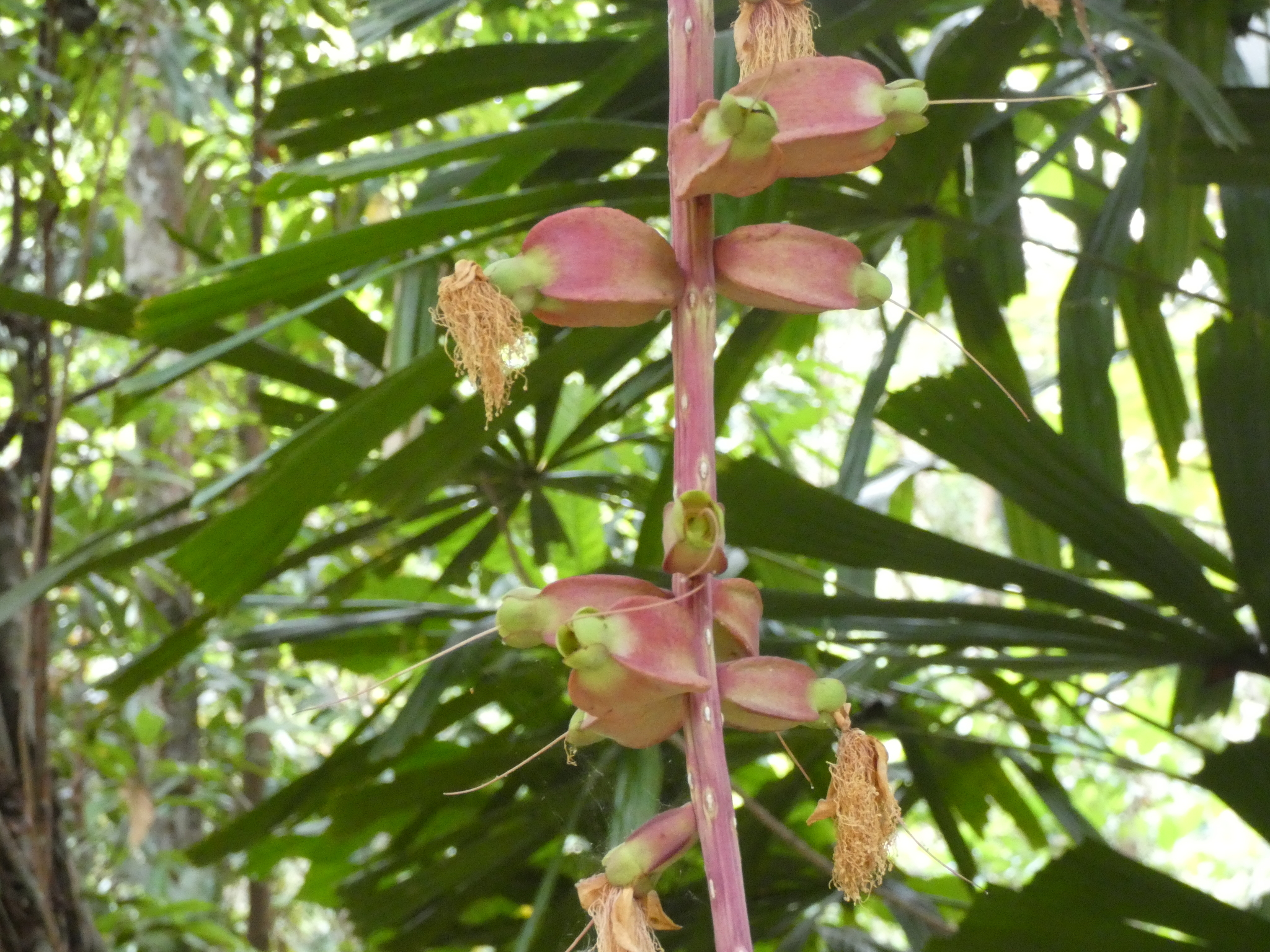
- In Thailand

Scientific classification
- Kingdom: Plantae
- Clade: Embryophytes
- Clade: Tracheophytes
- Clade: Spermatophytes
- Clade: Angiosperms
- Clade: Eudicots
- Clade: Asterids
- Order: Ericales
- Family: Lecythidaceae
- Genus: Barringtonia
- Species: B. macrocarpa

Binomial name
- Barringtonia macrocarpa Hassk.

Synonyms
- List: Barringtonia comosa Gagnep.; Barringtonia helferi C.B.Clarke; Barringtonia insignis (Blume) Miq.; Barringtonia reinwardtii Miq.; Barringtonia serrata Miq.; Megadendron macrocarpum (Hassk.) Miers; Michelia helferi (C.B.Clarke) Kuntze; Michelia insignis (Blume) Kuntze; Michelia macrocarpa (Hassk.) Kuntze; Michelia reinwardtii (Miq.) Kuntze; Michelia serrata (Miq.) Kuntze; Stravadium insigne Blume; Stravadium reinwardtii (Miq.) Miers; Stravadium serratum (Miq.) Miers

= Barringtonia macrocarpa =

Species of flowering plant

Barringtonia macrocarpa grows as a shrub or tree up to 30 metres (100 ft) tall, with a trunk diameter of up to 24 centimetres (9 in). The fruits are winged, up to 12.5 cm (5 in) long. Its habitat is lowland riverine and swamp forest. Barringtonia macrocarpa is found in Myanmar, Thailand, Vietnam, Malaysia and Indonesia.
