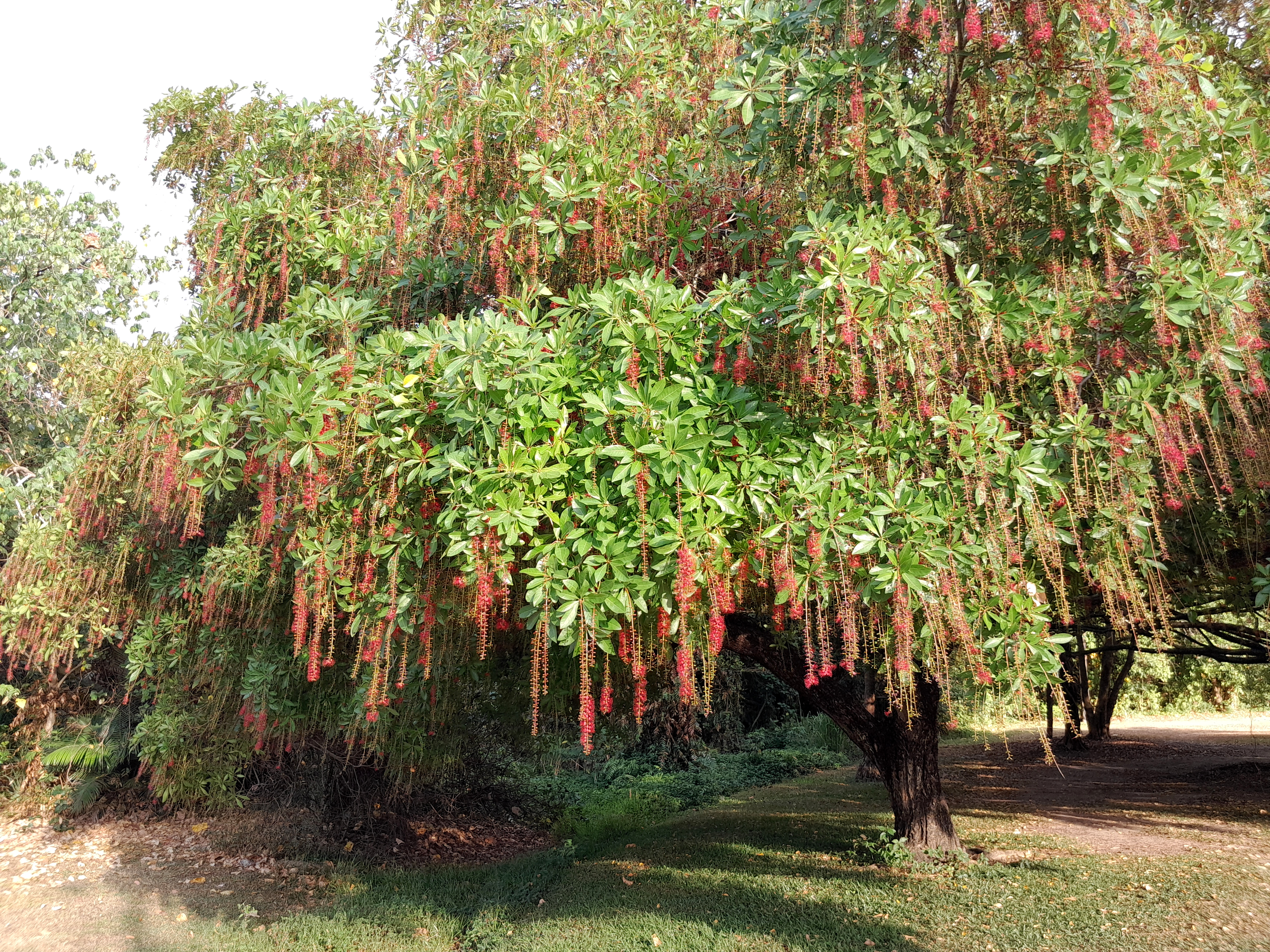
- B. acutangula in flower

Scientific classification
- Kingdom: Plantae
- Clade: Tracheophytes
- Clade: Angiosperms
- Clade: Eudicots
- Clade: Asterids
- Order: Ericales
- Family: Lecythidaceae
- Subfamily: Barringtonioidea
- Genus: Barringtonia; J.R.Forst. & G.Forst., conserved name

Synonyms
- 16 synonyms: Abdulmajidia Whitmore; Agasta Miers; Baranda Llanos; Botryoropis C.Presl; Butonica Lam.; Commercona Sonn.; Doxomma Miers; Huttum Adans. nom. rej.; Megadendron Miers; Menichea Sonn. ex J.F.Gmel.; Menichea Sonn. not validly publ.; Meteorus Lour.; Michelia Kuntze nom. illeg.; Mitraria J.F.Gmel.; Stravadia Pers.; Stravadium Juss.

= Barringtonia =

Genus of flowering plants

Barringtonia is a genus of flowering plants in the family Lecythidaceae first described as a genus with this name in 1775. It is native to Africa, southern Asia, Australia, and various islands of the Pacific and Indian Oceans. The genus name commemorates Daines Barrington.

== Description ==
Plants in this genus are evergreen trees or shrubs, which may be deciduous or semi-deciduous. Leaves are entire or toothed. Inflorescences are pendulous or (rarely) erect racemes, either terminal, axillary, or cauliflorus. The calyx has four or five lobes (with the exception of B. asiatica, two or three), petals number between three and six. Stamens are numerous, arranged in three to eight whorls. Ovaries are two to four locular, with two to eight ovules per locule. The fruit may be obovate, ellipsoid or fusiform, and may be angled or winged. They contain one large seed.

== Species list ==
The following is a list of all 73 species of Barringtonia accepted by Plants of the World Online as of June 2025:

- Barringtonia acutangula (L.) Gaertn. − India, SE Asia, Afghanistan, New Guinea, Queensland
- Barringtonia apiculata Lauterb. − Sulawesi, New Guinea
- Barringtonia ashtonii Payens − Borneo
- Barringtonia asiatica (L.) Kurz − India, Madagascar, SE Asia, the Northern Territory, Queensland, various islands of the Pacific & Indian Oceans
- Barringtonia augusta Kurz − Indochina
- Barringtonia belagaensis Chantar. − Sarawak
- Barringtonia calyptrata (Miers) R.Br. ex Benth. − New Guinea, Queensland
- Barringtonia calyptrocalyx K.Schum. − New Guinea, New Britain
- Barringtonia chaniana (Whitmore) Prance − Peninsular Malaysia
- Barringtonia chantaranoi Prance − Borneo
- Barringtonia conoidea Griff. − Indochina, Peninsular Malaysia
- Barringtonia corneri Kiew & K.M.Wong − Peninsular Malaysia
- Barringtonia curranii Merr. − Sarawak, Sabah, Palawan
- Barringtonia edulis Seem. − Fiji, Vanuatu
- Barringtonia filirachis Payens − Peninsular Malaysia, Sumatra
- Barringtonia fitriana Latiff – Peninsula Malaysia
- Barringtonia fusicarpa Hu − China
- Barringtonia fusiformis King − Peninsular Malaysia
- Barringtonia gigantostachya Koord. & Valeton − Java
- Barringtonia glomerata Prance − Peninsular Malaysia
- Barringtonia hallieri R.Knuth − Borneo
- Barringtonia havilandii Ridl. − Borneo
- Barringtonia integrifolia (Montrouz.) Schltr. − New Caledonia, Loyalty Islands
- Barringtonia jebbiana Takeuchi - New Guinea
- Barringtonia josephstaalensis W.N.Takeuchi − New Guinea
- Barringtonia khaoluangensis Chantar. − Thailand
- Barringtonia lanceolata (Ridl.) Payens − Borneo
- Barringtonia latiffiana (El-Sherif) Prance − Pulau Langkawi
- Barringtonia lauterbachii R.Knuth − New Guinea
- Barringtonia laxiflora Thammar., Pornp. & Chantar. − Vietnam
- Barringtonia longifolia Schltr. − New Caledonia
- Barringtonia longipes Gagnep. − Indochina, Peninsular Malaysia
- Barringtonia longisepala Payens − Brunei, Sabah
- Barringtonia lumina Jebb & Prance − New Guinea, Solomon Islands
- Barringtonia macrocarpa Hassk. − Indochina, Peninsular Malaysia, Borneo, Java, Sumatra
- Barringtonia macrostachya (Jack) Kurz − SE Asia, Southern China, New Guinea
- Barringtonia magnifolia Prance − Maluku
- Barringtonia maxwelliana (Whitmore) Prance − Bukit Larut
- Barringtonia monticola Jebb & Prance − Papua New Guinea
- Barringtonia neocaledonica Vieill. − New Caledonia
- Barringtonia niedenzuana (K.Schum.) R.Knuth − Sulawesi, Maluku Islands, Papuasia
- Barringtonia norshamiae Prance − Peninsular Malaysia
- Barringtonia novae-hiberniae Lauterb. − Huon Peninsula, Papuasia
- Barringtonia palawanensis Chantar. − Palawan
- Barringtonia papeh Lauterb. − Papuasia
- Barringtonia papuana Lauterb. − New Guinea
- Barringtonia parkinsonii Thammar. − Myanmar
- Barringtonia pauciflora King − Perak
- Barringtonia payensiana Whitmore − Perak, Selangor
- Barringtonia pendula (Griff.) Kurz − Yunnan, Indochina, Peninsular Malaysia, Borneo, Java, Sumatra
- Barringtonia pinnifolia Jebb & Prance − Papua New Guinea
- Barringtonia procera (Miers) R.Knuth − Papuasia, Vanuatu
- Barringtonia pseudoglomerata Chantar. − Sarawak, Sabah
- Barringtonia pterita Merr. − Philippines
- Barringtonia racemosa (L.) Spreng. − E & SE Africa, S & SE Asia, S China, Queensland, various islands of the Pacific & Indian Oceans
- Barringtonia reticulata (Blume) Miq. − Andaman & Nicobar, W Indonesia, Philippines
- Barringtonia revoluta Merr. − Peninsular Malaysia, Borneo, Sumatra
- Barringtonia ridsdalei Chantar. − Palawan
- Barringtonia rimata Chantar. − Peninsular Malaysia, S Thailand
- Barringtonia samoensis A.Gray − Samoa, Micronesia, New Guinea, Maluku, Sulawesi
- Barringtonia sanimiranii Rohana & Latiff. − Peninsular Malaysia
- Barringtonia sarawakensis Chantar. − Sarawak
- Barringtonia sarcostachys (Blume) Miq. − Sumatra, Borneo
- Barringtonia schmidtii Warb. ex Craib. − Thailand, Peninsular Malaysia
- Barringtonia scortechinii King − Peninsular Malaysia, S Thailand, Borneo, Sumatra
- Barringtonia seaturae H.B.Guppy − Fiji
- Barringtonia serenae Jebb & Prance − Papua New Guinea
- Barringtonia tagala Jebb & Prance − Papua New Guinea
- Barringtonia terengganuensis Chantar. − Terengganu
- Barringtonia thailandica Thammar., Pornp. & Chantar. − eastern Thailand
- Barringtonia tomentosa Thammar., Pornp. & Chantar. − Vietnam
- Barringtonia waasii Chantar. − Sri Lanka
- Barringtonia zainudiniana (El-Sherif & Latiff) Prance − Kedah

== Gallery ==
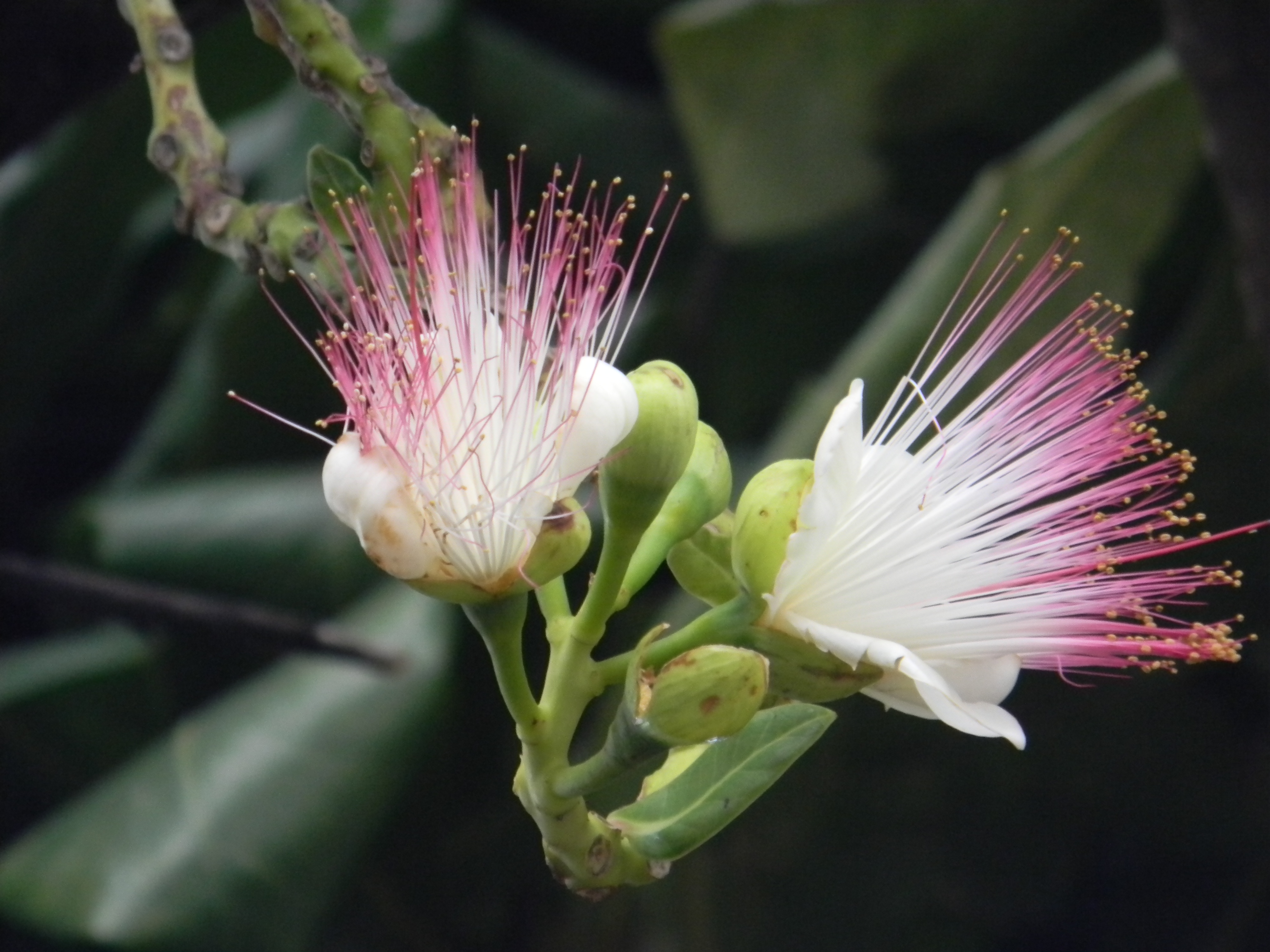
Flowers of B. asiatica

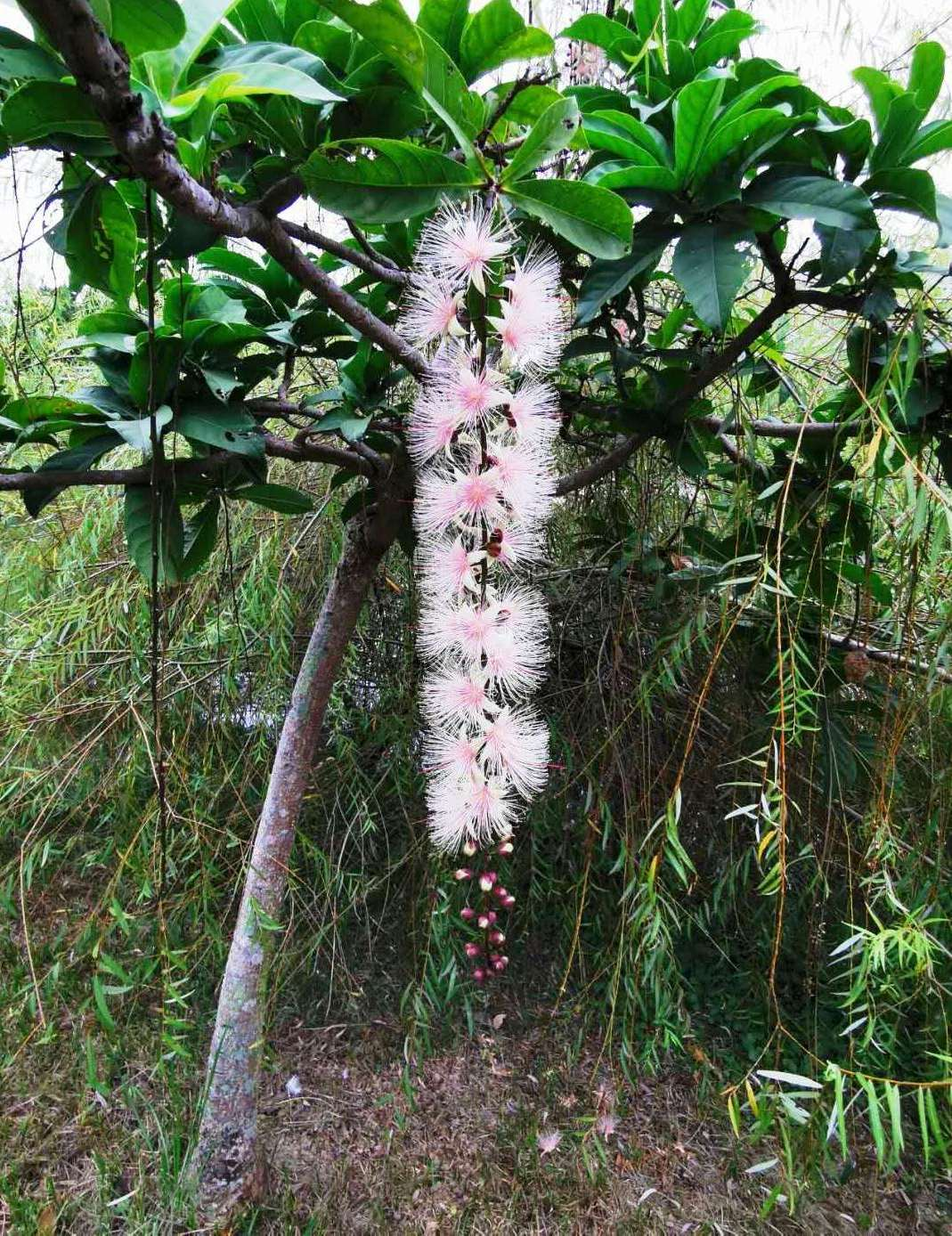
Flowers of B. racemosa

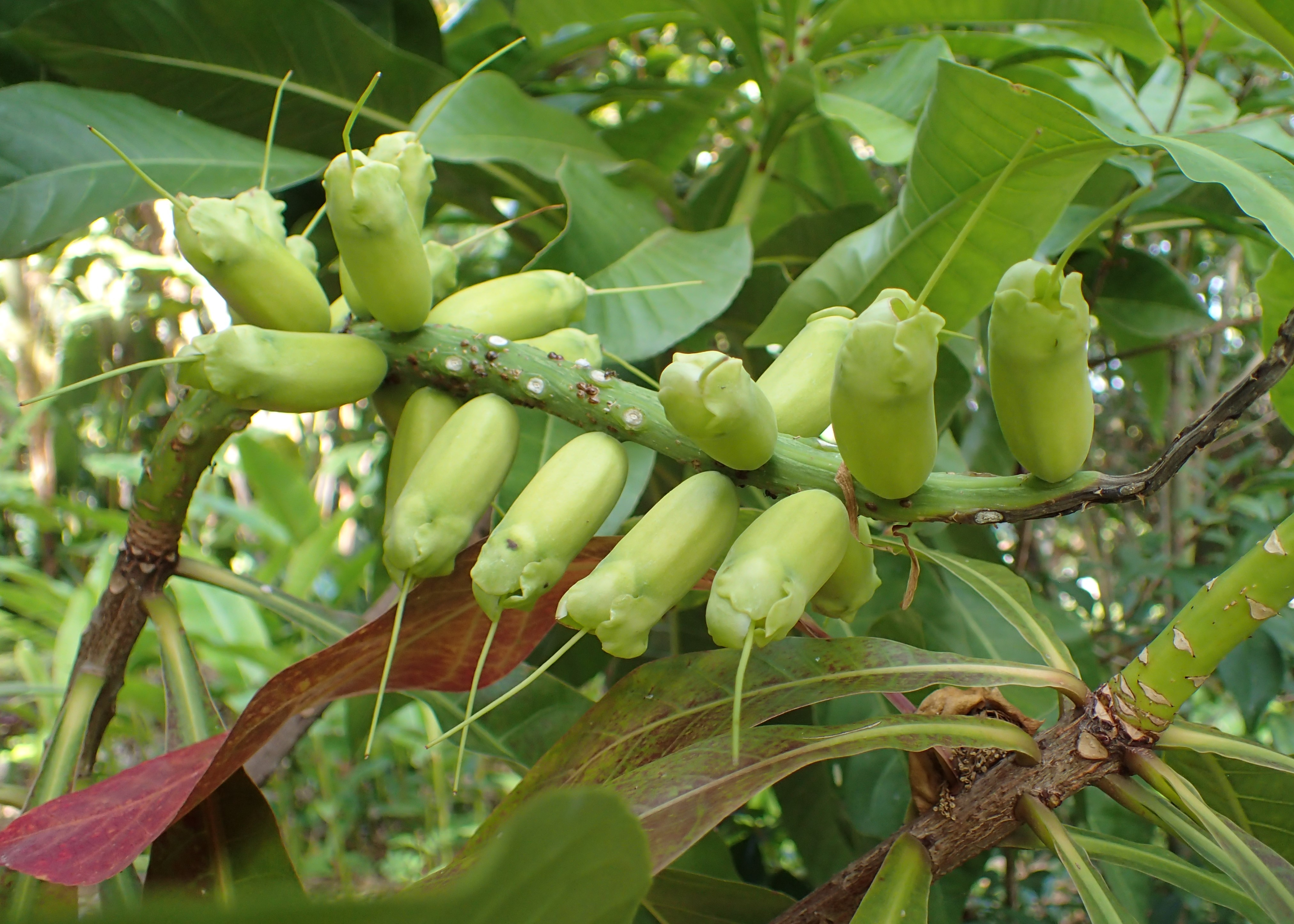
Fruit of B. neocaledonica

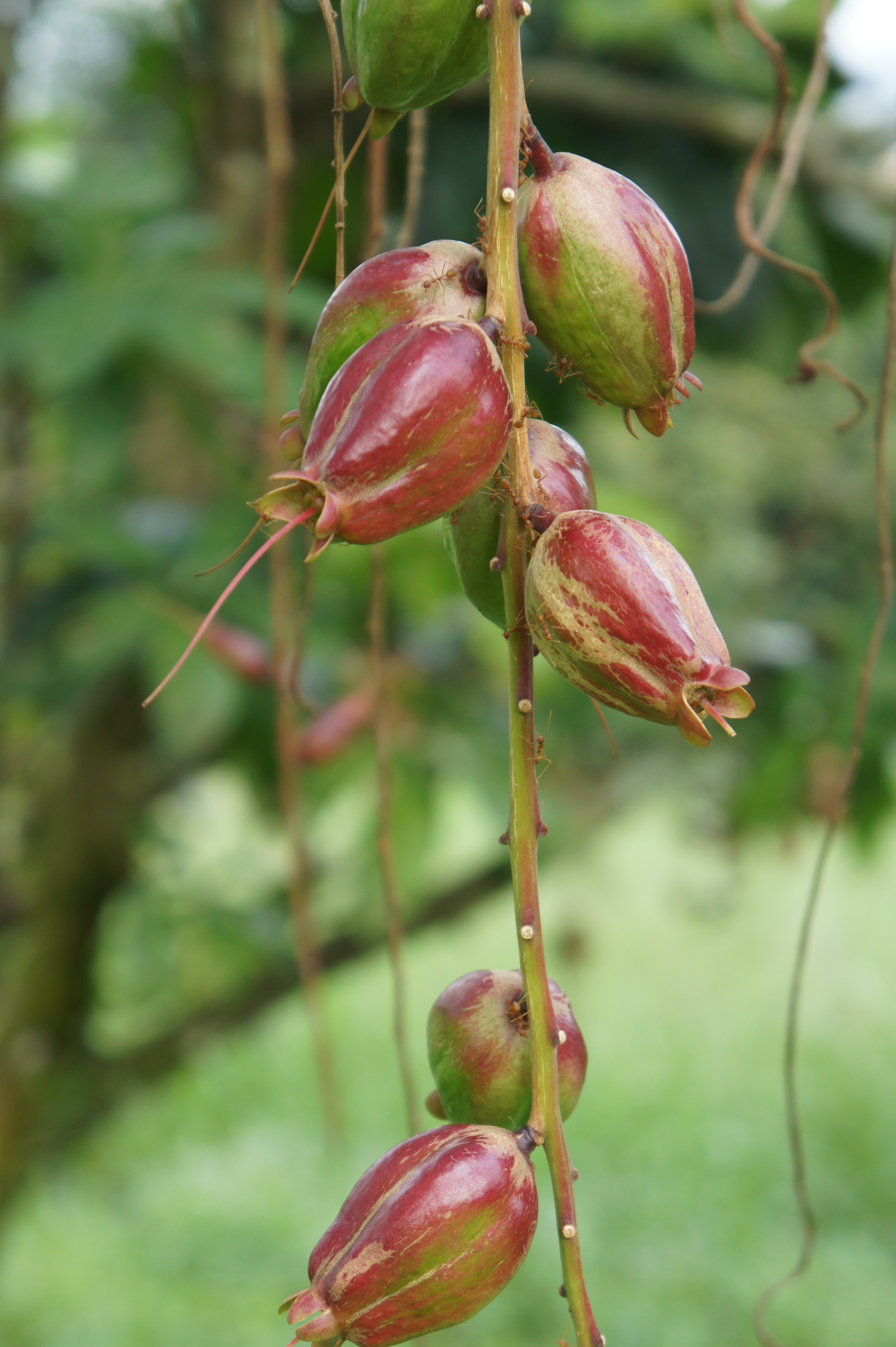
Fruit of B. racemosa

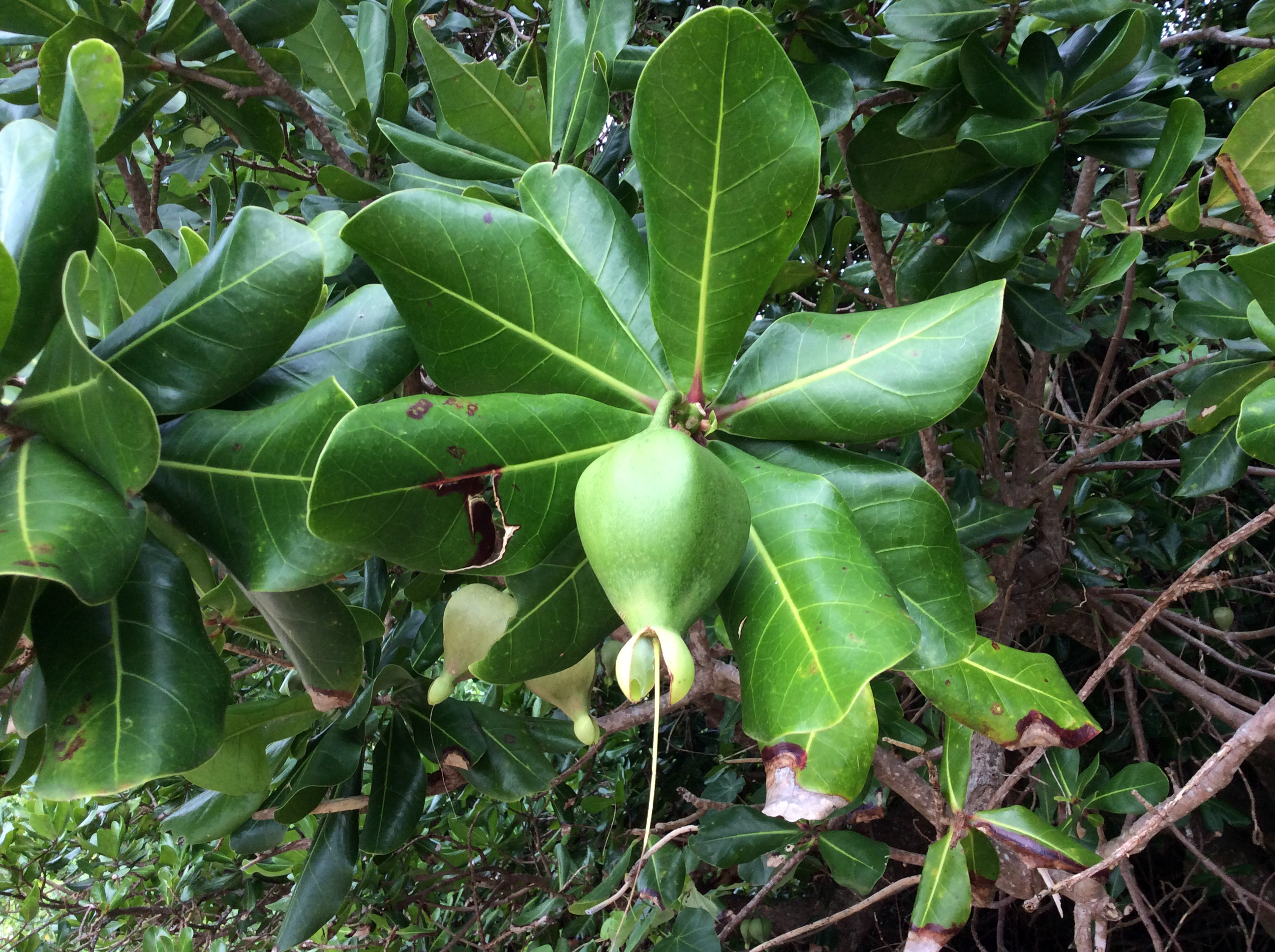
Fruit of B. asiatica
