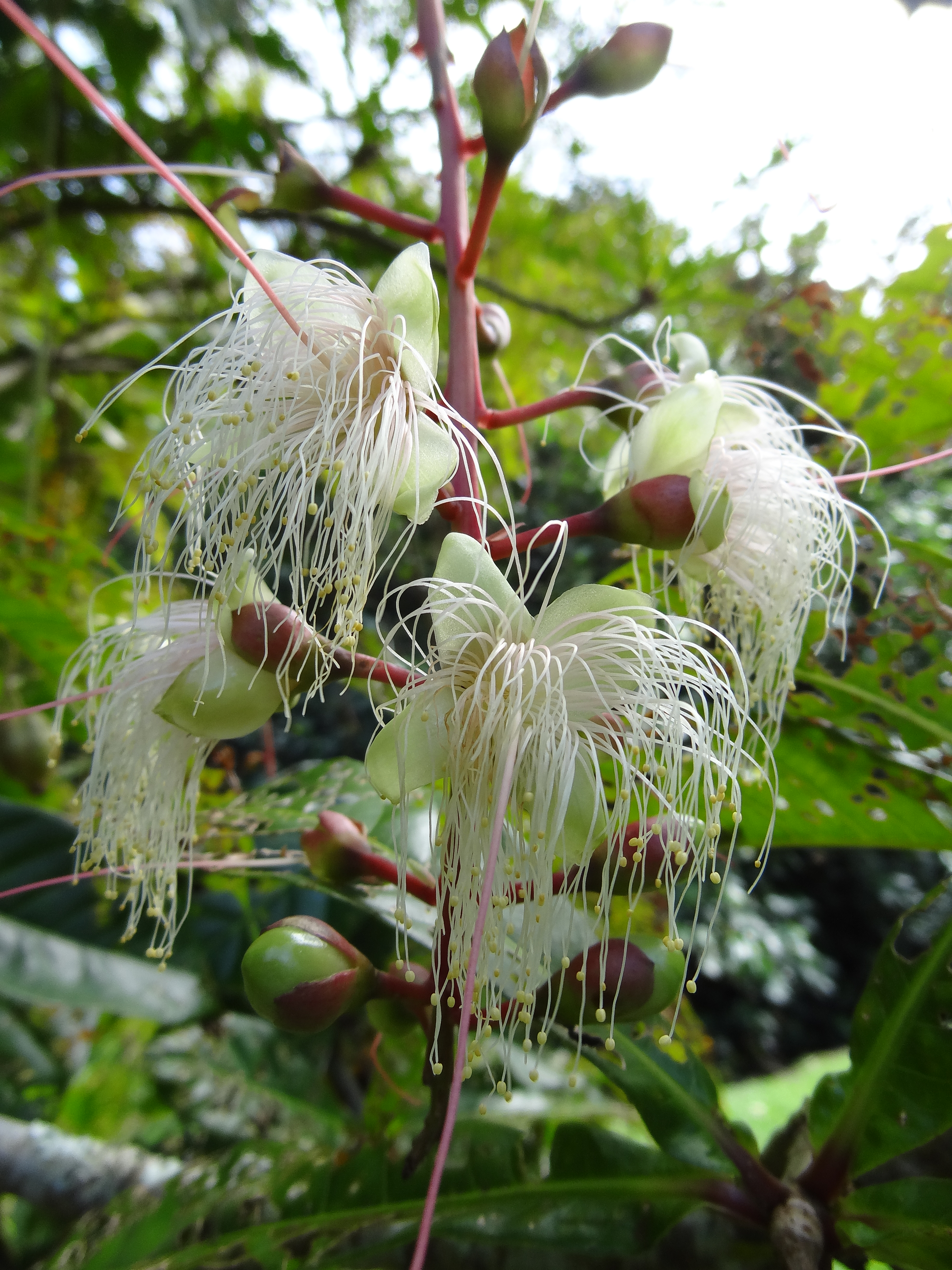

Conservation status
- Least Concern (IUCN 3.1)

Scientific classification
- Kingdom: Plantae
- Clade: Tracheophytes
- Clade: Angiosperms
- Clade: Eudicots
- Clade: Asterids
- Order: Ericales
- Family: Lecythidaceae
- Genus: Barringtonia
- Species: B. racemosa

Binomial name
- Barringtonia racemosa (L.) Spreng.

Synonyms
- Barringtonia apiculata (Miers) R.Knuth [Illegitimate]; Barringtonia caffra (Miers) E.Mey. ex R.Knuth; Barringtonia caffra E. Mey.; Barringtonia celebesensis R.Knuth; Barringtonia ceramensis R.Knuth; Barringtonia ceylanica (Miers) Gardner ex C.B.Clarke; Barringtonia elongata Korth.; Barringtonia excelsa A.Gray; Barringtonia inclyta Miers ex B.D.Jacks. [Invalid]; Barringtonia lageniformis Merr. & L.M.Perry; Barringtonia longiracemosa C.T.White; Barringtonia obtusangula (Blume) R.Knuth; Barringtonia pallida (Miers) Koord. & Valeton; Barringtonia racemosa Oliv.; Barringtonia racemosa (L.) Blume ex DC.; Barringtonia racemosa var. elongata (Korth.) Blume; Barringtonia racemosa var. minor Blume; Barringtonia racemosa var. procera Blume; Barringtonia racemosa var. subcuneata Miq.; Barringtonia rosaria Oken; Barringtonia rosata (Sonn.) R.Knuth; Barringtonia rumphiana (Miers) R.Knuth; Barringtonia salomonensis Rech.; Barringtonia stravadium Blanco; Barringtonia terrestris (Miers) R.Knuth; Barringtonia timorensis Blume; Butonica alba (Pers.) Miers [Illegitimate]; Butonica apiculata Miers; Butonica caffra Miers; Butonica ceylanica Miers; Butonica inclyta Miers; Butonica racemosa (L.) Juss.; Butonica rosata (Sonn.) Miers; Butonica rumphiana Miers; Butonica terrestris Miers; Caryophyllus racemosus (L.) Stokes; Eugenia racemosa L.; Huttum racemosum (L.) Britten; Megadendron ambiguum Miers; Megadendron pallidum Miers; Menichea rosata Sonn.; Michelia apiculata (Miers) Kuntze; Michelia ceylanica (Miers) Kuntze; Michelia racemosa (L.) Kuntze; Michelia rosata (Sonn.) Kuntze; Michelia timorensis (Blume) Kuntze; Stravadium album Pers. [Illegitimate]; Stravadium obtusangulum Blume; Stravadium racemosum (L.) Sweet; Stravadium rubrum DC. [Illegitimate]

= Barringtonia racemosa =

Species of tree

Barringtonia racemosa, commonly known as powder-puff tree, is a species of tree in the family Lecythidaceae. It is found in coastal swamp forests and on the edges of estuaries in the Indian Ocean, starting at the east coast of Mozambique and KwaZulu-Natal (South Africa) to Madagascar, India, Sri Lanka, Malesia, Maldives, Thailand, Laos, southern China, northern Australia, coastal Taiwan, the Ryukyu Islands and many Polynesian islands.

The 1889 book 'The Useful Native Plants of Australia' records that the Indigenous people of the Mitchell River District called this plant "Yakooro" and that "The root of this tree has a bitter taste, and is used by Hindoo [sic.] practitioners on account of its aperient and cooling qualities. The seeds and bark are also used in native medicine; the latter is of a reddish colour, and is said to possess properties allied to the Cinchonas. The pulverised fruit is used as snuff, and, combined with other remedies, is applied externally in diseases of the skin. (Treasury of Botany)."

The powder-puff tree is a protected tree in South Africa.

== Gallery ==
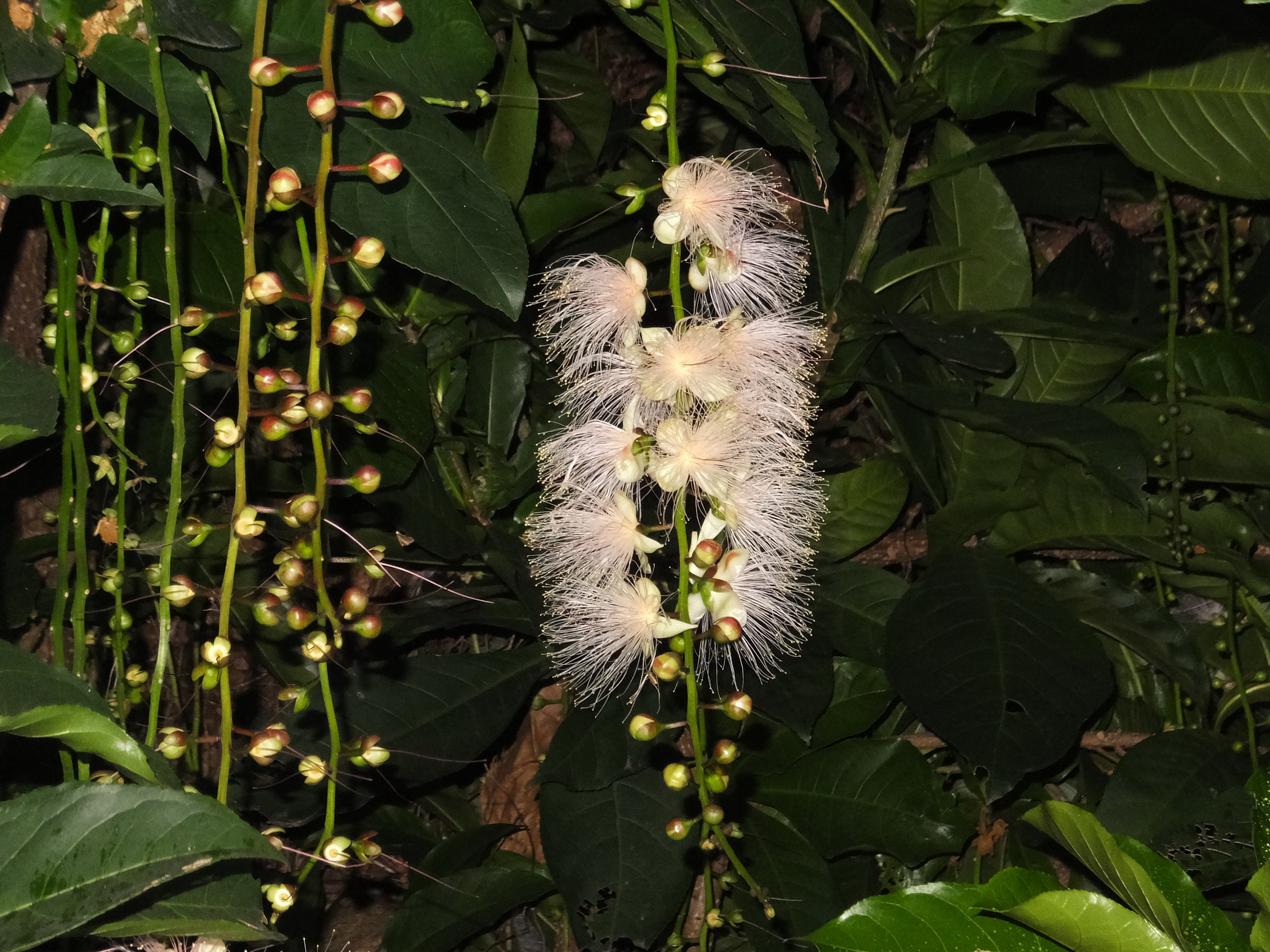
Flowers and foliage

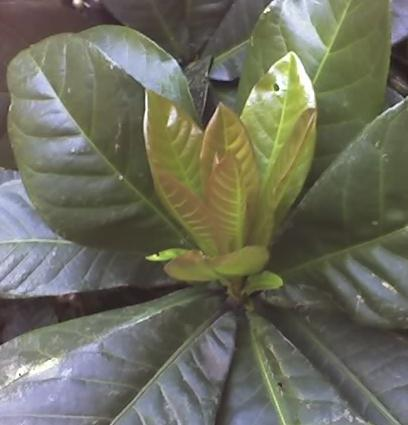
New leaves

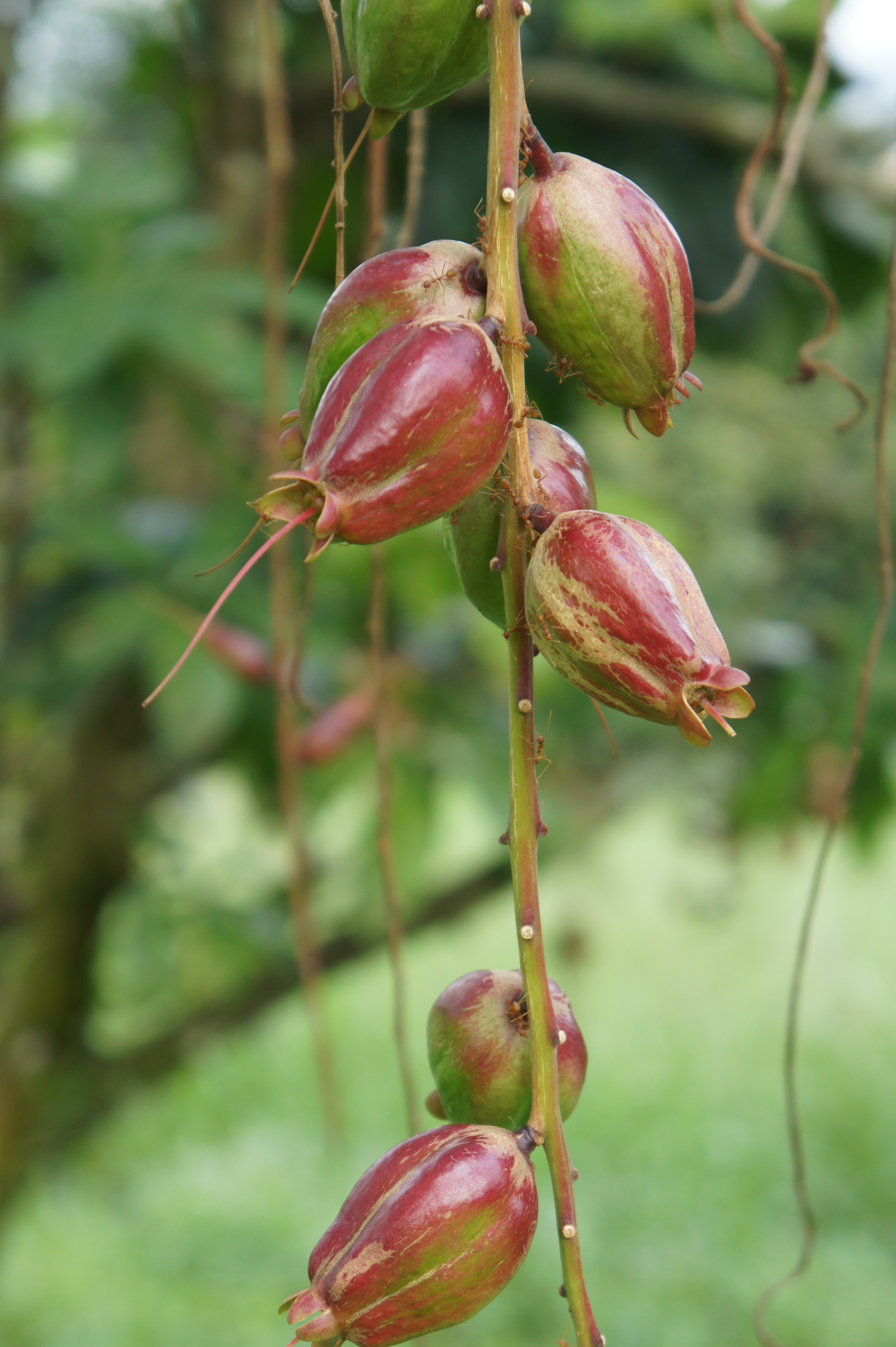
Fruit

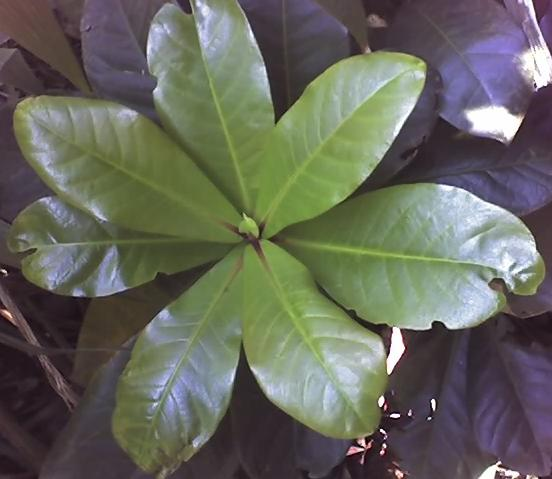
Young leaves

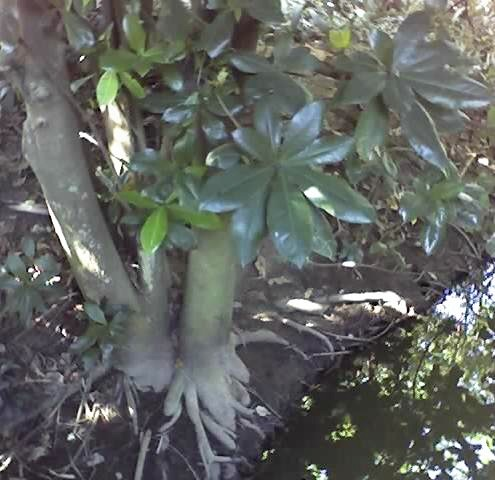
Roots in stream bank

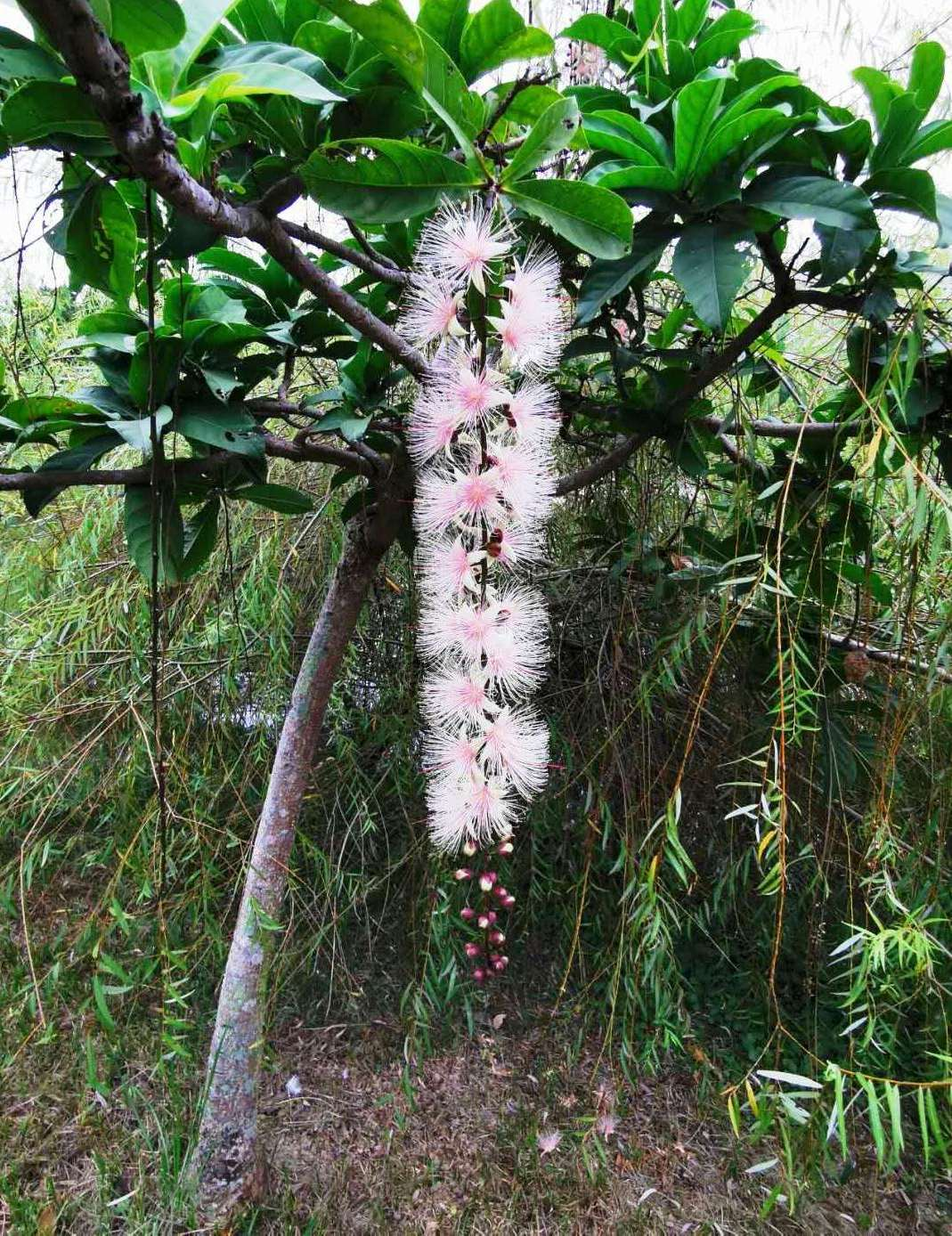
Inflorescence

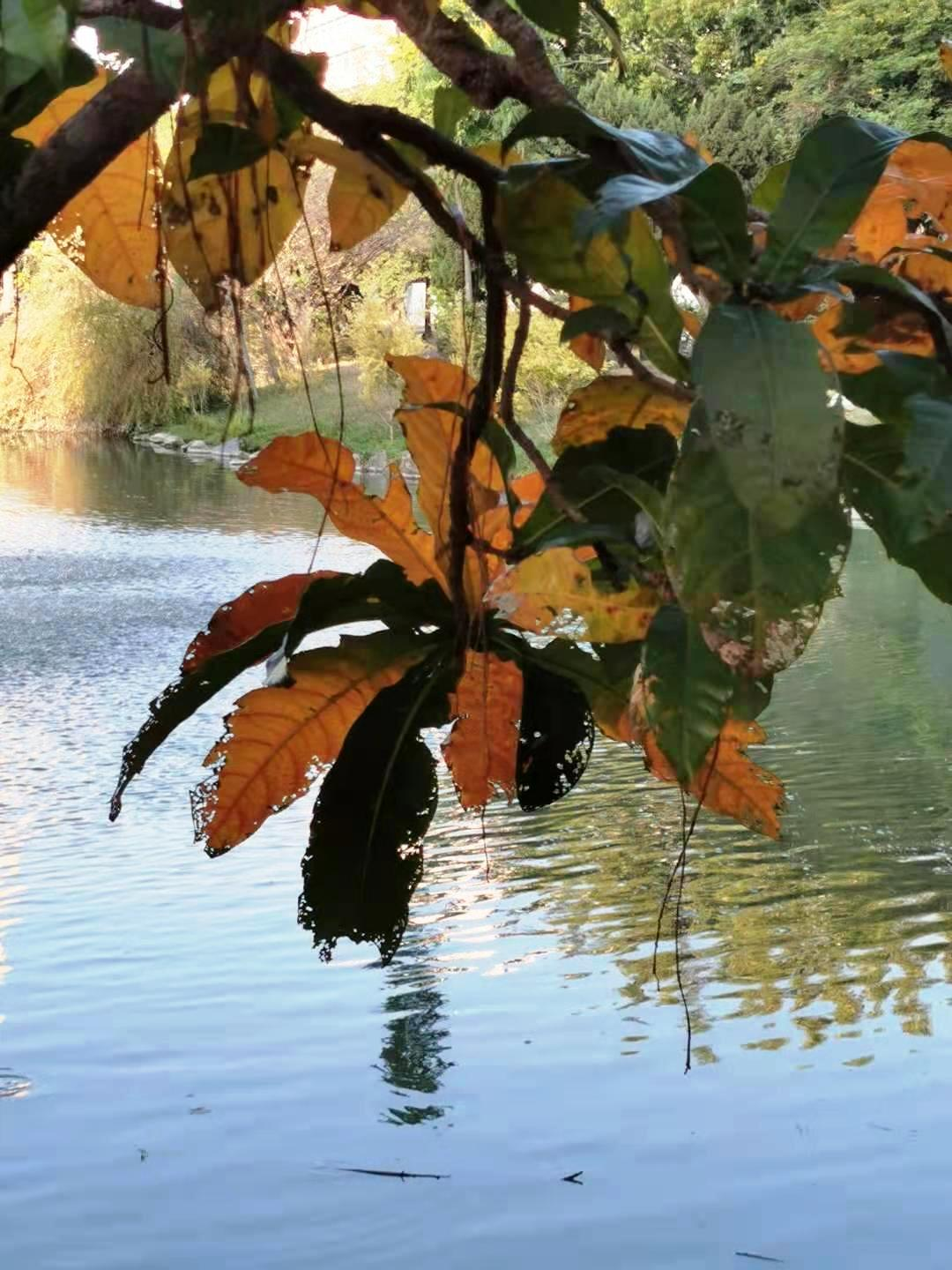
Leaves in winter

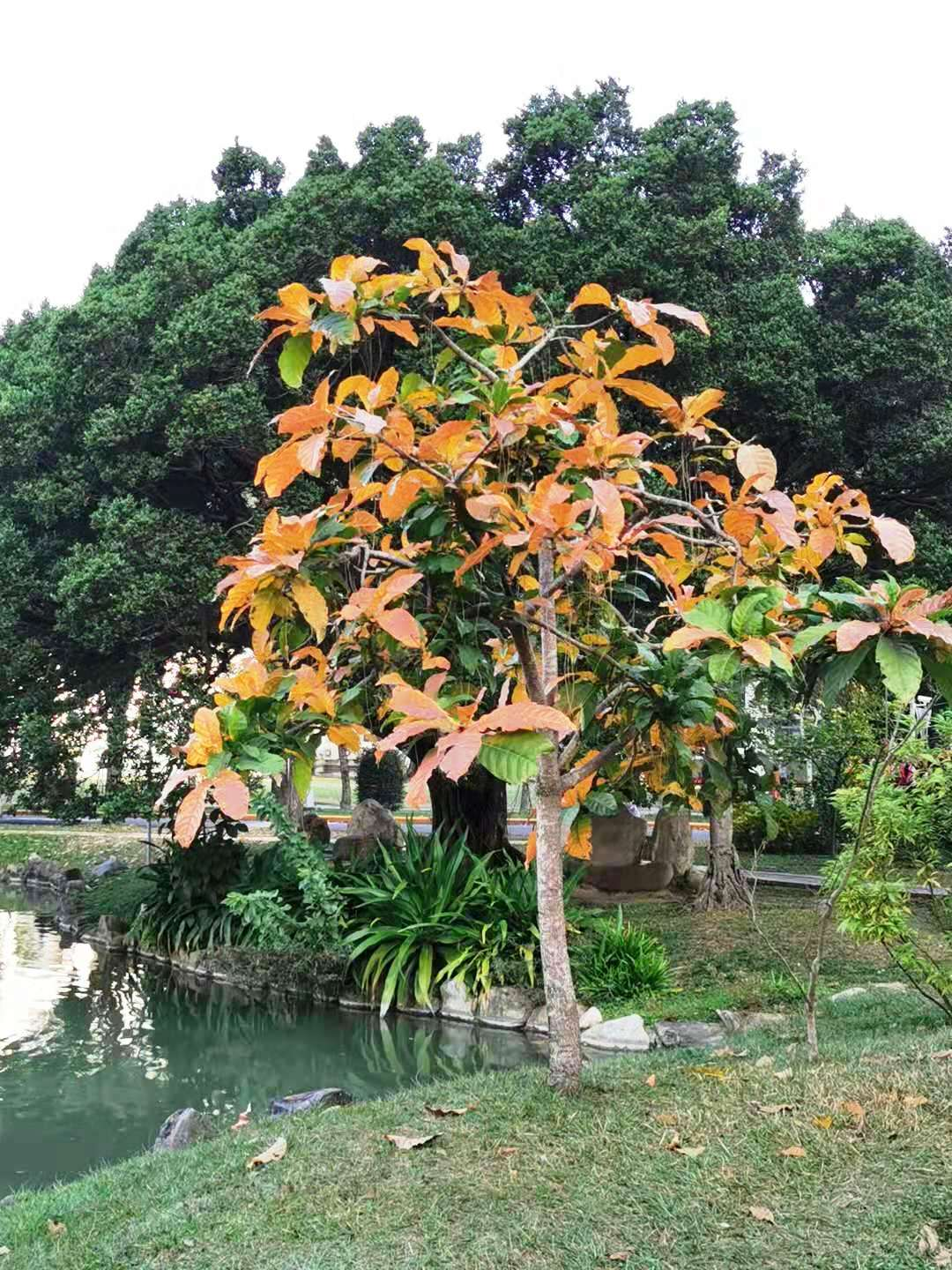
Plant in winter

== See also ==
- List of Southern African indigenous trees
