= Reinhard Gustav Paul Knuth =

German botanist (1874–1957)

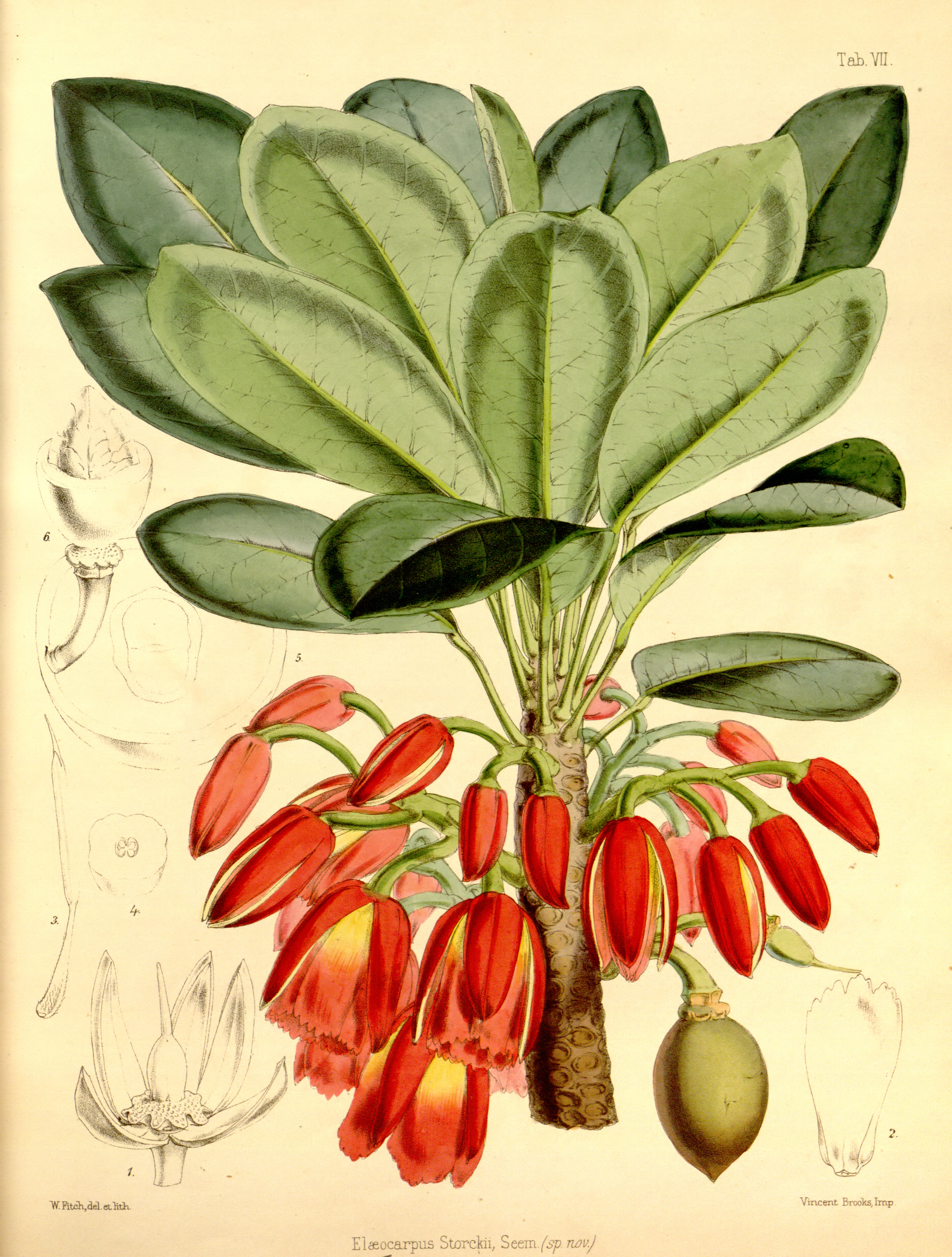
Elaeocarpus storckii from the family Elaeocarpaceae studied by Knuth

Reinhard Gustav Paul Knuth (1874–1957) was a German taxonomist, botanist and pteridologist responsible for "Initia florae venezuelensis" in 1928, and numerous contributions to Adolf Engler's "Das Pflanzenreich" on Geraniaceae, Oxalidaceae, Lecythidaceae, and other families.

He worked for more than 50 years at the Botanical Museum in Berlin-Dahlem. As part of his training in plant systematics he visited the herbaria at Kew, Brussels, Geneva, Paris and Utrecht. He was not only a botanist, but was well-versed in zoology, chemistry and geography. While his main interests in botany were systematics and phytogeography, he also ventured into other disciplines and in his final 30 years was working on problems in bacteriology and the growth of Ascomycetes, the source of antibiotics and yeast. His own extensive herbarium collection of some 26 000 specimens was lost when the Dahlem Botanical Museum was destroyed by bombing and fire on the nights of 1 and 2 March 1943. The catastrophe was keenly felt by Knuth who had closely identified with the Museum and had experienced his botanical grounding there. Also destroyed were all his notes and manuscripts including his monograph on the Elaeocarpaceae, ready to go to press.

In addition to frequent collecting trips in Germany, Knuth travelled to locations such as the Carpathian Mountains and Algeria.

== Some Publications ==
- Knuth, R, A Engler, L Diels, H Stubbe, K Noack. 1956. "Das Pflanzenreich". H. 105 = IV. 219. Barringtoniaceae. Ed. Engelmann
- Pax, FA; Knuth, RGP. 1905. "Primulaceae". Mit 311 Einzelbildern in 75 Figuren und 2 Verbreitungskarten (Das Pflanzenreich. Hft. 22.)
- "Über die geographische Verbreitung und die Anpassungserscheinungin der Gattung Geranium im Verhältnis zu ihrer systematischen Gliederung", Inaugural-Dissertation... von Reinhard Knuth. 1902. Ed. W. Engelmann. 47 pp.

He is commemorated in Elaeocarpus knuthii Merr. 1951, Euphorbia knuthii Pax, Eschweilera knuthii J.F.Macbr. 1940, Oxalis knuthii Herter 1931, Oxalis knuthii Pittier 1939. Knuth is denoted by the author abbreviation R.Knuth when citing a botanical name.
