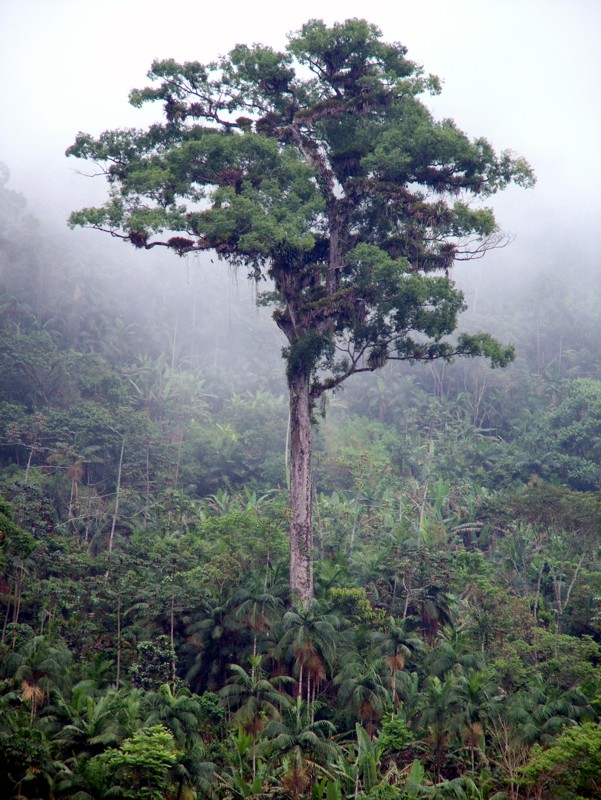
- Cariniana legalis

Scientific classification
- Kingdom: Plantae
- Clade: Embryophytes
- Clade: Tracheophytes
- Clade: Spermatophytes
- Clade: Angiosperms
- Clade: Eudicots
- Clade: Asterids
- Order: Ericales
- Family: Lecythidaceae
- Subfamily: Lecythidoideae
- Genus: Cariniana; Casar.

Synonyms
- Amphoricarpus Spruce ex Miers

= Cariniana =

Genus of plants

Cariniana is a genus of trees in the family Lecythidaceae, first described as a genus in 1842. The entire genus is native to South America. Many are of importance for timber production. Species of this genus may be known commonly as jequitibá. The timber provides high chatoyance, with an average value above 20 PZC.

Species

1. Cariniana domestica - Brazil, Bolivia
2. Cariniana estrellensis - Brazil, Bolivia, Paraguay, Peru
3. Cariniana ianeirensis - Brazil, Bolivia
4. Cariniana legalis - E Brazil
5. Cariniana micrantha - W Brazil
6. Cariniana parvifolia - Brazil (Espírito Santo)
7. Cariniana penduliflora - Brazil (Rondônia)
8. Cariniana pyriformis - Colombia, Venezuela
9. Cariniana rubra - Brazil

Formerly included

(moved to other genera: Allantoma, Couratari)

1. C. decandra - Allantoma decandra
2. C. integrifolia - Allantoma integrifolia
3. C. kuhlmannii - Allantoma kuhlmannii
4. C. multiflora - Allantoma pluriflora
5. C. pachyantha - Allantoma pachyantha
6. C. paraensis - Couratari guianensis
7. C. pauciramosa - Allantoma pauciramosa
8. C. uaupensis - Allantoma uaupensis
