= List of endangered flora of Brazil =

This is a partial list of the endangered flora of Brazil as listed under an act published in Portaria 37-N de 3 de abril de 1992 (Act No 37-N on April 3, 1992) by IBAMA.

== Categories ==
Species are classified in four groups, set through criteria such as rate of decline, population size, area of geographic distribution, and degree of population and distribution fragmentation.

- Critically Endangered (CR) - Portuguese: Rara (R)
- Endangered (EN) - Portuguese: Em perigo (E)
- Vulnerable (VU) - Portuguese: Vulnerável (V)
- Data Deficient (DD) - Portuguese: Indeterminada (I)

== Official state lists of endangered flora ==
- Official list of endangered flora of Bahia Official endangered flora of Bahia map
- Official list of endangered flora of Espírito Santo
- Official list of endangered flora of Minas Gerais
- Official list of endangered flora of Rio Grande do Sul

== Anacardiaceae ==
- Astronium fraxinifolium Schott - Category: Vulnerable (VU)

Area of geographic distribution: Bahia, Ceará, Espírito Santo, Goiás, Mato Grosso, Maranhão, Minas Gerais, Piauí, and Rio Grande do Norte.

- Astronium urundeuva Engl. - Category: Vulnerable (VU)

Area of geographic distribution: Bahia, Ceará, Espírito Santo, Goiás, Mato Grosso, Maranhão, Minas Gerais, Piauí, and Rio Grande do Norte.

== Araucariaceae ==
- Araucaria angustifolia (Bertol.) Kuntze - Category: Vulnerable (VU)

Area of geographic distribution: Minas Gerais, Paraná, Rio Grande do Sul, Santa Catarina, and São Paulo

== Arecaceae ==
- Acanthococos emensis Toledo - Category: Critically Endangered (CR)

Area of geographic distribution: Minas Gerais and São Paulo

== Asclepiadaceae ==
- Ditassa arianeae Fontella & E.A.Schwarz

Area of geographic distribution:

- Ditassa maricaensis Fontella & E.A.Schwarz

Area of geographic distribution:

== Asteraceae ==
- Aspilia grazielae J.U.Santos (spelled Aspilia grasielae in the bill) - Category: Data Deficient (DD)

Area of geographic distribution: Mato Grosso do Sul

- Aspilia paraensis (Huber) J.U.Santos - Category: Critically Endangered (CR)

Area of geographic distribution: Pará

- Aspilia pohlii Backer - Category: Data Deficient (DD)

Area of geographic distribution: Rio Grande do Norte

- Aspilia procumbens Backer - Category: Critically Endangered (CR)

Area of geographic distribution: Rio Grande do Norte

- Delairea aparadensis Backer - Category: Critically Endangered (CR)

Area of geographic distribution: Santa Catarina

== Bromeliaceae ==
- Aechmea apocalyptica Reitz - Category: Critically Endangered (CR)

Area of geographic distribution: Paraná, Santa Catarina, and São Paulo

- Aechmea blumenavii Reitz - Category: Critically Endangered (CR)

Area of geographic distribution: Santa Catarina

- Aechmea kleinii Reitz - Category: Critically Endangered (CR)

Area of geographic distribution: Santa Catarina

- Aechmea pimenti-velosii Reitz - Category: Critically Endangered (CR)

Area of geographic distribution: Santa Catarina

- Billbergia alfonsi-joannis Reitz - Category: Endangered (EN)

Area of geographic distribution: Espírito Santo and Santa Catarina

== Caesalpinioideae ==
- Bauhinia smilacina Steud. - Category: Vulnerable (VU)

Area of geographic distribution: Bahia and Rio de Janeiro

- Caesalpinia echinata Lam. - Category: Endangered (EN)

Area of geographic distribution: Bahia, Pernambuco, Rio Grande do Norte and Rio de Janeiro

== Chrysobalanaceae ==
- Couepia schottii Fritsch

== Costaceae ==
- Costus cuspidatus (Nees & Mart.) Maas

Area of geographic distribution:

- Costus fragilis Maas

Area of geographic distribution:

- Costus fusiformis Maas

Area of geographic distribution:

== Dicksoniaceae ==
- Dicksonia sellowiana Hook.

Area of geographic distribution:

== Faboideae ==
- Bowdichia nitida Spruce ex Benth. (spelled Bowdickia nitida in the bill) - Category: Vulnerable (VU)

Area of geographic distribution: Amazonas, Pará and Rondônia.

- Dalbergia nigra (Vell.) Allemão ex Benth. - Category: Vulnerable (VU)

Area of geographic distribution: Bahia and Espírito Santo

== Lauraceae ==
- Aniba roseodora Ducke - Category: Endangered (EN)

Area of geographic distribution: Amazonas, Pará

- Dicypellium caryophyllatum Nees - Category:

Area of geographic distribution:

== Lecythidaceae ==
- Bertholletia excelsa Humb. & Bonpl. - Category: Vulnerable (VU)

Area of geographic distribution: Acre, Amazonas, Maranhão, Pará and Rondônia.

- Cariniana ianeirensis Kunth

Area of geographic distribution:

== Moraceae ==
- Brosimum glaucum Taub.

Area of geographic distribution:

- Brosimum glaziovii Taub.

Area of geographic distribution:

- Dorstenia arifolioa Lam. - Category: Vulnerable (VU)

Area of geographic distribution: Espírito Santo, Minas Gerais, Rio de Janeiro, and São Paulo

- Dorstenia cayapia - Category: Endangered (EN)

Area of geographic distribution: Bahia, Espírito Santo, Minas Gerais, Rio de Janeiro, and São Paulo

- Dorstenia elata - Category: Critically Endangered (CR)

Area of geographic distribution: Minas Gerais, Espírito Santo, Rio de Janeiro

- Dorstenia ficus - Category: Critically Endangered (CR)

Area of geographic distribution: Rio de Janeiro

- Dorstenia fischeri - Category: Endangered (EN)

Area of geographic distribution: Rio de Janeiro

- Dorstenia ramosa - Category: Vulnerable (VU)

Area of geographic distribution: Rio de Janeiro

- Dorstenia tenuis - Category: Vulnerable (VU)

Area of geographic distribution: Paraná and Santa Catarina

== Orchidaceae ==
- Cattleya schilleriana Rchb.f.

Area of geographic distribution: endemic to Bahia, extinct in the wild.

== Sapotaceae ==
- Bumelia obtusifolia Roem. & Schult. var. excelsa (DC) Mig.

Area of geographic distribution:

== See also ==
- Conservation in Brazil
- Wildlife of Brazil
- List of plants of Amazon Rainforest vegetation of Brazil
- List of plants of Atlantic Forest vegetation of Brazil
- List of plants of Caatinga vegetation of Brazil
- List of plants of Cerrado vegetation of Brazil
- List of plants of Pantanal vegetation of Brazil
