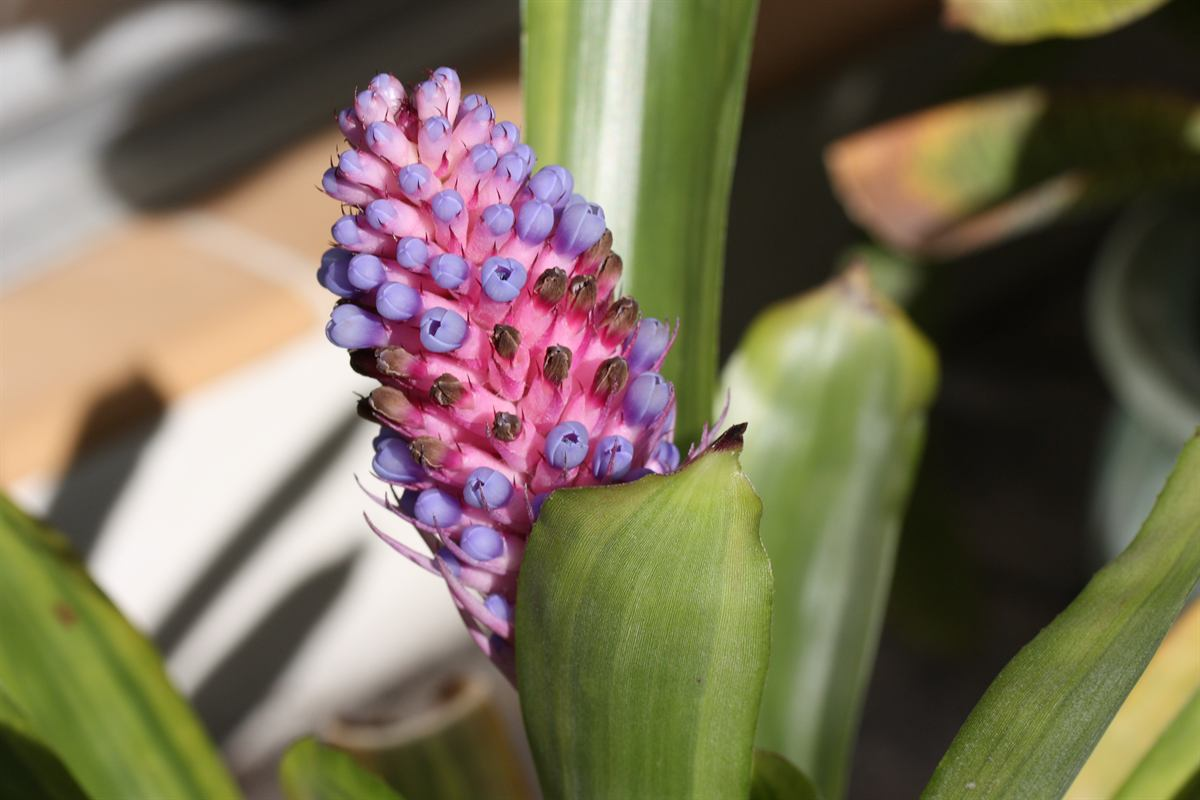

Scientific classification
- Kingdom: Plantae
- Clade: Tracheophytes
- Clade: Angiosperms
- Clade: Monocots
- Clade: Commelinids
- Order: Poales
- Family: Bromeliaceae
- Genus: Aechmea
- Subgenus: Aechmea subg. Ortgiesia
- Species: A. cylindrata

Binomial name
- Aechmea cylindrata Lindm.

Synonyms
- Aechmea hyacinthus F.Muell.; Ortgiesia cylindrata (Lindm.) L.B.Sm. & W.J.Kress; Aechmea cylindrata var. micrantha Lindm.

= Aechmea cylindrata =

Species of flowering plant

Aechmea cylindrata is a species of flowering plant in the family Bromeliaceae. This bromeliad is native to southeastern Brazil from São Paulo to Santa Catarina. This plant is cited in Flora Brasiliensis by Carl Friedrich Philipp von Martius, and it is often used as an ornamental plant.
