= A. caudata =

A. caudata may refer to:

- Aechmea caudata, a plant species native to Brazil
- Artanthe caudata, a synonym for Piper marginatum, the cake bush, Anesi wiwiri, marigold pepper, Ti Bombé in Creole or Hinojo, a plant species found in moist, shady spots in the Amazon rainforest in Surinam, French Guiana and Brazil

== See also ==
- Caudata (disambiguation)
