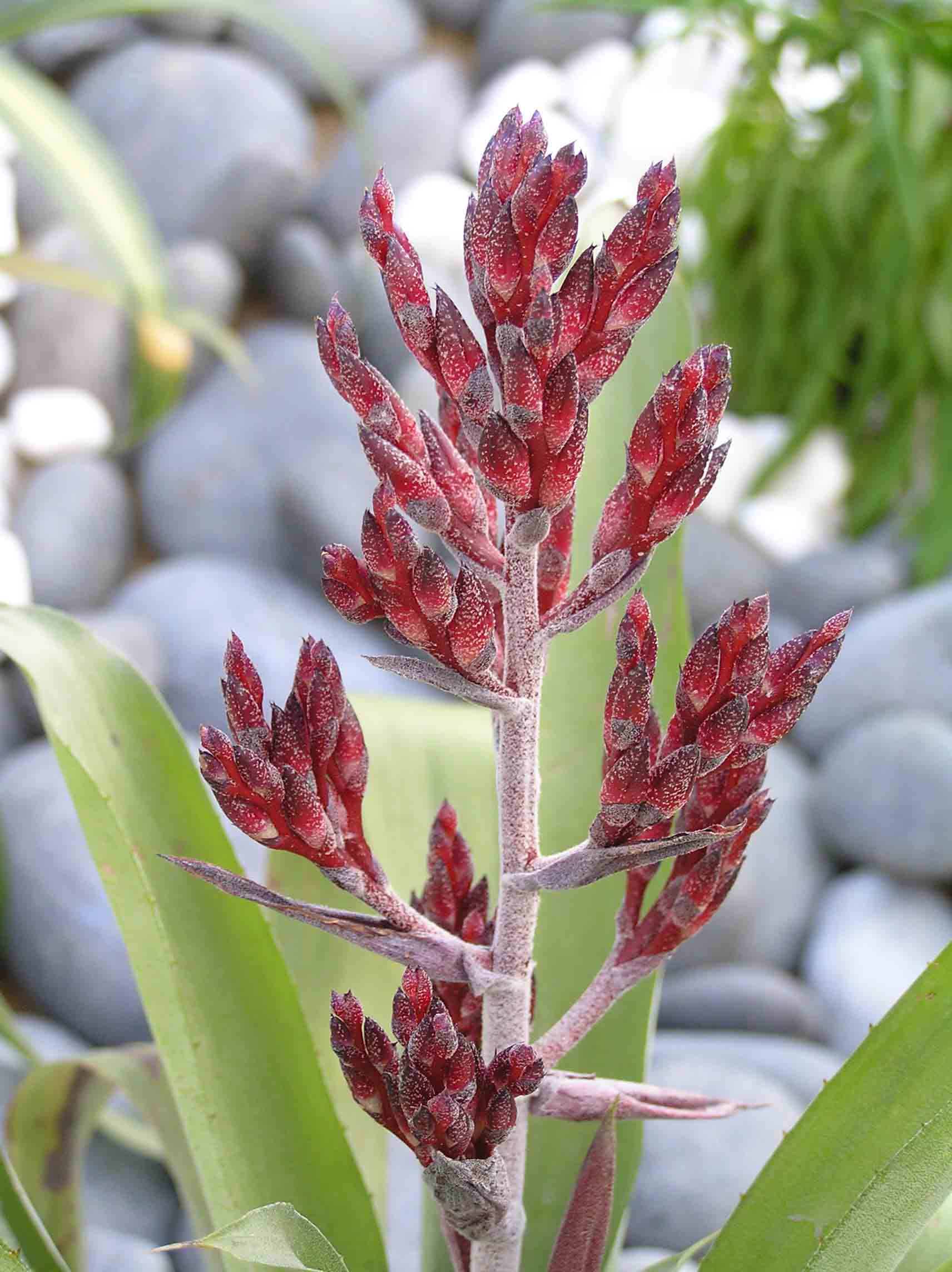
- Aechmea gracilis at the Lok Fu Flower Show, Hong Kong

Scientific classification
- Kingdom: Plantae
- Clade: Tracheophytes
- Clade: Angiosperms
- Clade: Monocots
- Clade: Commelinids
- Order: Poales
- Family: Bromeliaceae
- Genus: Aechmea
- Subgenus: Aechmea subg. Ortgiesia
- Species: A. gracilis

Binomial name
- Aechmea gracilis Lindm.

Synonyms
- Ortgiesia gracilis (Lindm.) L.B.Sm. & W.J.Kress

= Aechmea gracilis =

Species of plant

Aechmea gracilis is a species of flowering plant in the family Bromeliaceae. It is endemic to southeastern Brazil from Rio de Janeiro State to Santa Catarina.

== Cultivars ==
- Aechmea 'Ilha Grande'
- Aechmea 'Magpie'
