= A. candida =

A. candida may refer to:

An abbreviation of a species name. In binomial nomenclature the name of a species is always the name of the genus to which the species belongs, followed by the species name (also called the species epithet). In A. candida the genus name has been abbreviated to A. and the species has been spelled out in full. In a document that uses this abbreviation it should always be clear from the context which genus name has been abbreviated.

Some of the most common uses of A. candida are:

- Aechmea candida, a plant species endemic to Brazil
- Albugo candida, the white rust, a fungus species
- Amazilia candida, the white-bellied emerald, a hummingbird species found in Belize, Costa Rica, Guatemala, Honduras, Mexico and Nicaragua

== See also ==
- Candida (disambiguation)
