= Couratari longipedicellata =

Conservation status
- Vulnerable (IUCN 2.3)

Scientific classification
- Kingdom: Plantae
- Clade: Tracheophytes
- Clade: Angiosperms
- Clade: Eudicots
- Clade: Asterids
- Order: Ericales
- Family: Lecythidaceae
- Genus: Couratari
- Species: C. longipedicellata

Binomial name
- Couratari longipedicellata W. Rodrigues

Species of flowering plant

Couratari longipedicellata is a species of rainforest tree in the Monkeypot Family (Lecythidaceae). It is found only in Brazil. It is threatened by habitat loss. Perhaps its most remarkable feature is its very large seeds; up to 9.5 cm (4 in) long by up to 2.3 cm (0.91 in) wide.
