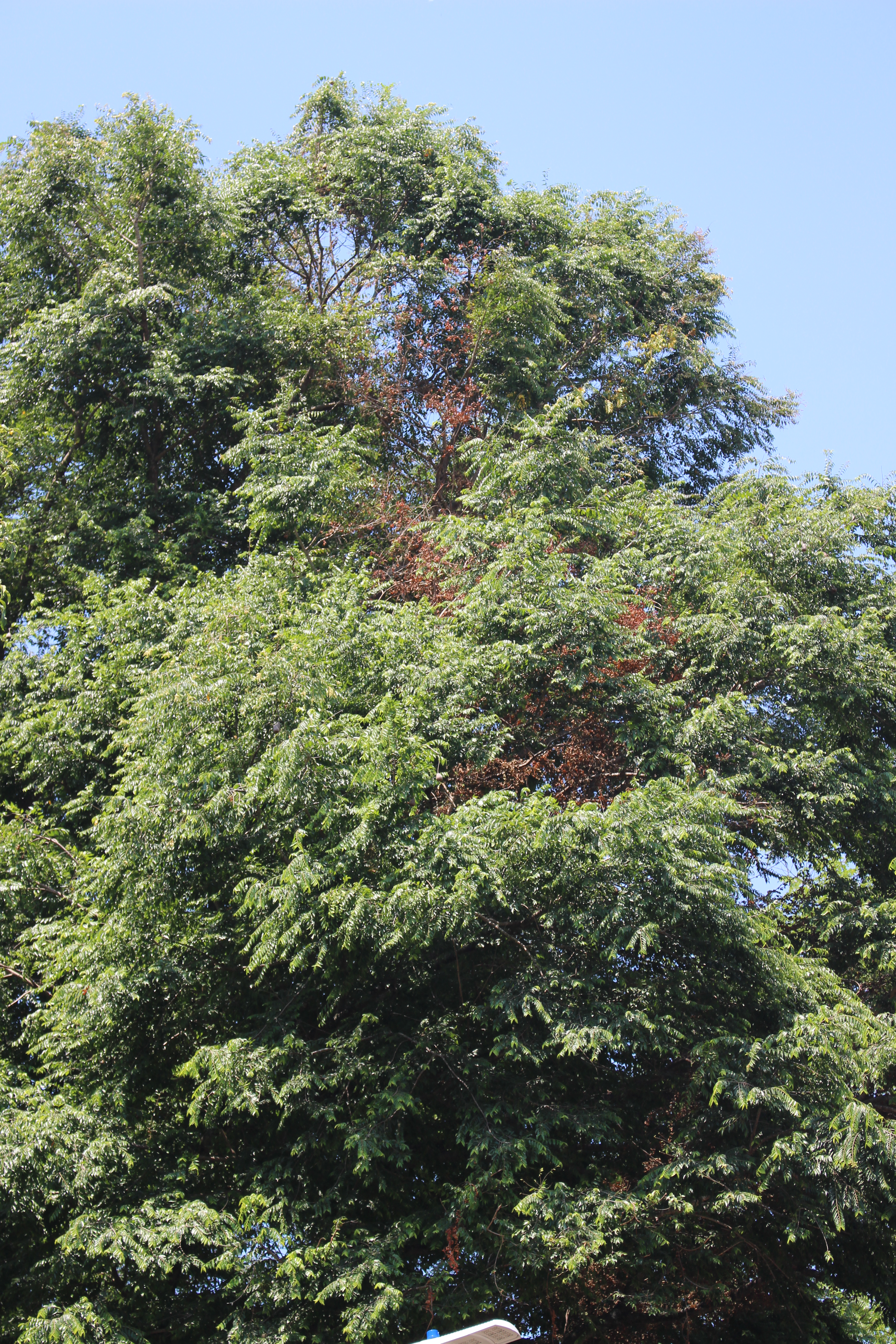

Conservation status
- Near Threatened (IUCN 2.3)

Scientific classification
- Kingdom: Plantae
- Clade: Tracheophytes
- Clade: Angiosperms
- Clade: Eudicots
- Clade: Asterids
- Order: Ericales
- Family: Lecythidaceae
- Genus: Cariniana
- Species: C. pyriformis

Binomial name
- Cariniana pyriformis Miers

Synonyms
- Heterotypic Synonyms: Cariniana clavata Novik; Cariniana exigua Miers

= Cariniana pyriformis =

Colombian mahogany

Species of flowering plant

Cariniana pyriformis is a species of woody plant in the family Lecythidaceae. It is sometimes referred to by the common names Colombian mahogany, Abarco, or Jequitibá. It is native to Brazil, Colombia, Costa Rica, and Venezuela. It is threatened by habitat loss.
