= Aechmea leonard-kentiana =

Scientific classification
- Kingdom: Plantae
- Clade: Tracheophytes
- Clade: Angiosperms
- Clade: Monocots
- Clade: Commelinids
- Order: Poales
- Family: Bromeliaceae
- Genus: Aechmea
- Subgenus: Aechmea subg. Ortgiesia
- Species: A. leonard-kentiana

Binomial name
- Aechmea leonard-kentiana H.Luther & Leme

Species of flowering plant

Aechmea leonard-kentiana is a plant species in the genus Aechmea. This species is endemic to the State of Bahia in eastern Brazil.
