= Allantoma lineata =

Scientific classification
- Kingdom: Plantae
- Clade: Embryophytes
- Clade: Tracheophytes
- Clade: Angiosperms
- Clade: Eudicots
- Clade: Asterids
- Order: Ericales
- Family: Lecythidaceae
- Genus: Allantoma
- Species: A. lineata

Binomial name
- Allantoma lineata Miers

Species of tree

Allantoma lineata (Portuguese common name: Seru) is a timber tree, typical of Amazon rainforest vegetation. It is native to Amazonas State in Venezuela, and also to Amazonas and Pará States in Brazil.
