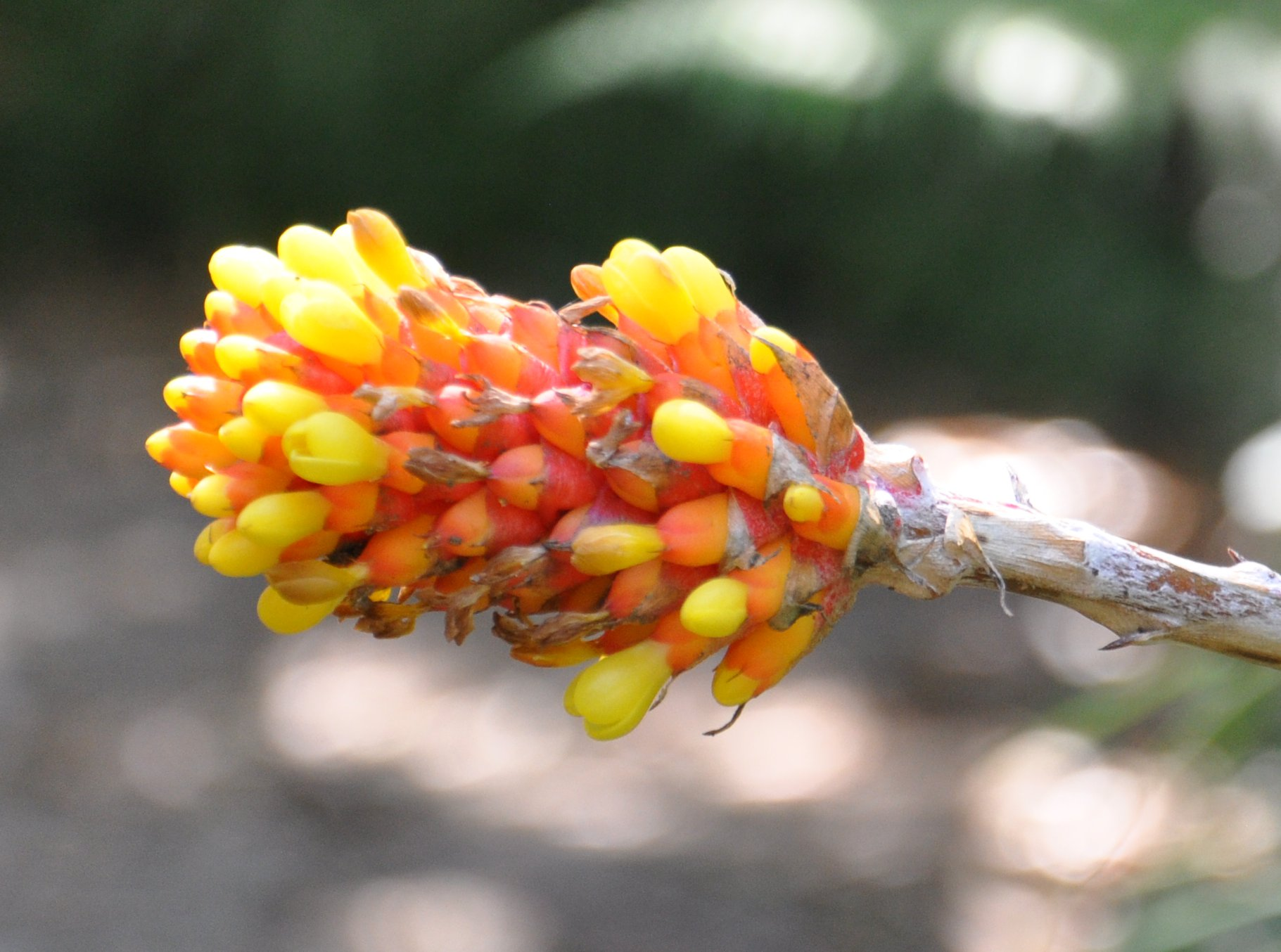

Scientific classification
- Kingdom: Plantae
- Clade: Tracheophytes
- Clade: Angiosperms
- Clade: Monocots
- Clade: Commelinids
- Order: Poales
- Family: Bromeliaceae
- Genus: Aechmea
- Subgenus: Aechmea subg. Ortgiesia
- Species: A. comata

Binomial name
- Aechmea comata (Gaudich.) Baker

Synonyms
- Pothuava comata Gaudich.; Hoplophytum comatum (Gaudich.) Beer; Hohenbergia comata (Gaudich.) Baker; Hoplophytum tetrastachyum Beer; Hoplophytum lindenii E.Morren; Aechmea lindenii (E.Morren) Baker; Macrochordion lindenii (E.Morren) Wittm.; Aechmea makoyana Jacob-Makoy; Hoplophytum lineatum W.Bull; Lamprococcus speciosus W.Bull; Hoplophytum makoyanum Micheli; Billbergia forgetiana Sander; Aechmea lindenii var. makoyana Mez; Aechmea comata var. makoyana (Mez) L.B.Sm.; Ortgiesia lindenii (E.Morren) L.B.Sm. & W.J.Kress; Ortgiesia lindenii var. makoyana (Mez) L.B.Sm. & W.J.Kress

= Aechmea comata =

Species of flowering plant

Aechmea comata is a species of flowering plant in the Bromeliaceae family. This species is endemic to southern Brazil.

== Infraspecifics ==
Varieties

- Aechmea comata var. makoyana (Mez) L.B. Smith

Cultivars

Many cultivars have been created, including:

- Aechmea 'Covata'
- Aechmea 'Covata Too'
- Aechmea 'Golden Comet'
- Aechmea 'Gotha'
- Aechmea 'Julian Nally'
- Aechmea 'Keith's Comet'
