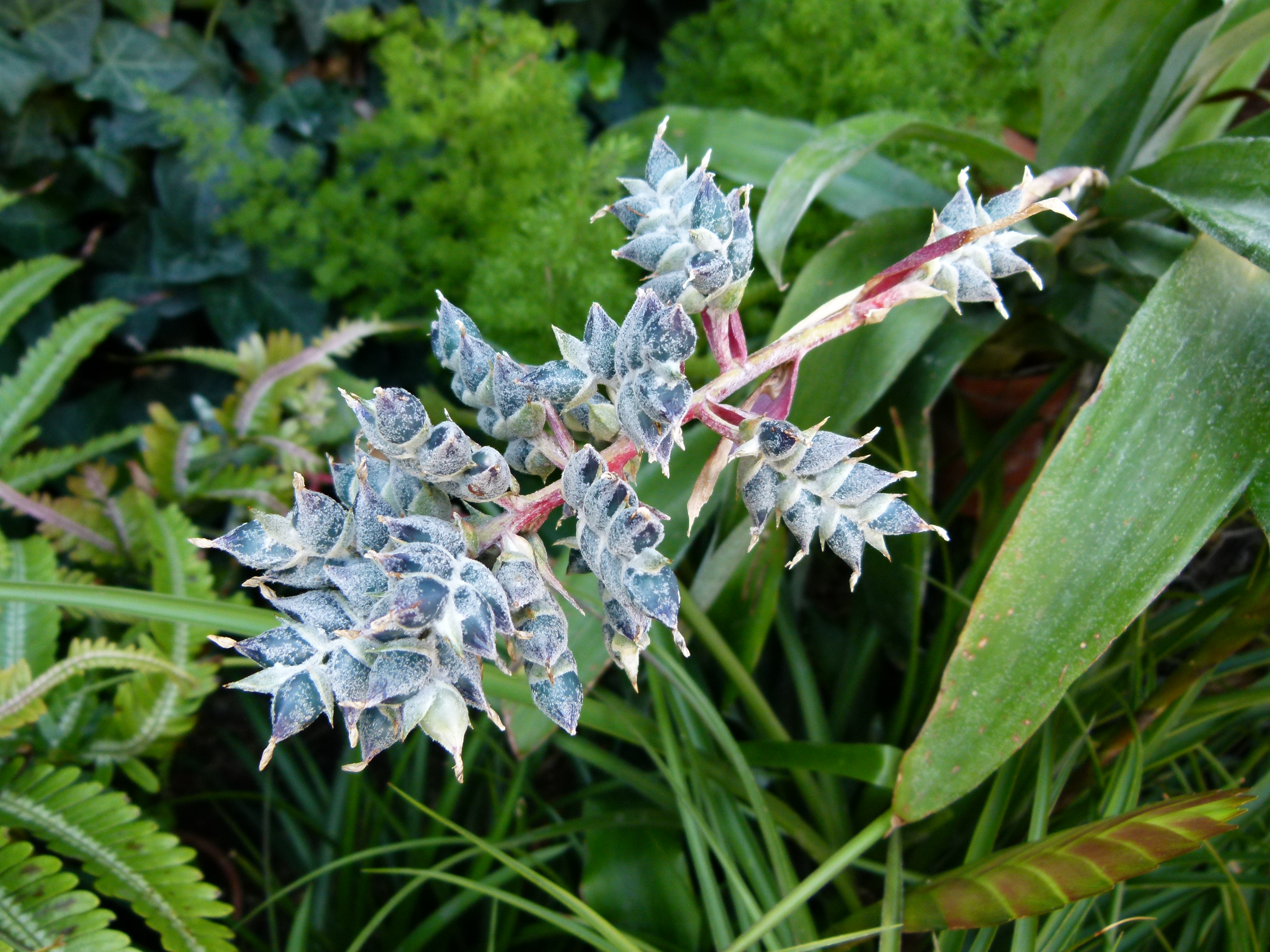

Scientific classification
- Kingdom: Plantae
- Clade: Tracheophytes
- Clade: Angiosperms
- Clade: Monocots
- Clade: Commelinids
- Order: Poales
- Family: Bromeliaceae
- Genus: Aechmea
- Subgenus: Aechmea subg. Ortgiesia
- Species: A. coelestis

Binomial name
- Aechmea coelestis (K.Koch) Jacob-Makoy

Synonyms
- Hoplophytum coeleste K.Koch; Hohenbergia coelestis (K.Koch) Baker; Ortgiesia coelestis (K.Koch) L.B.Sm. & W.J.Kress

= Aechmea coelestis =

Species of flowering plant

Aechmea coelestis is a species of flowering plant in the family Bromeliaceae. It is native to southeastern Brazil from Espírito Santo to Santa Catarina.

== Cultivars ==
Cultivars include:

- Aechmea 'Beads of Coral'
- Aechmea 'Golden Beads'
- Aechmea 'Hal Ellis'
- Aechmea 'Mauve Beads'
- Aechmea 'Mondamin'
- Aechmea 'Pink Beads'
