= Couratari pyramidata =

Conservation status
- Endangered (IUCN 2.3)

Scientific classification
- Kingdom: Plantae
- Clade: Tracheophytes
- Clade: Angiosperms
- Clade: Eudicots
- Clade: Asterids
- Order: Ericales
- Family: Lecythidaceae
- Genus: Couratari
- Species: C. pyramidata

Binomial name
- Couratari pyramidata (Vellozo) Knuth

Species of flowering plant

Couratari pyramidata is a species of flowering plant in the family Lecythidaceae. It is endemic to Brazil, where it is limited to the region around Rio de Janeiro.
