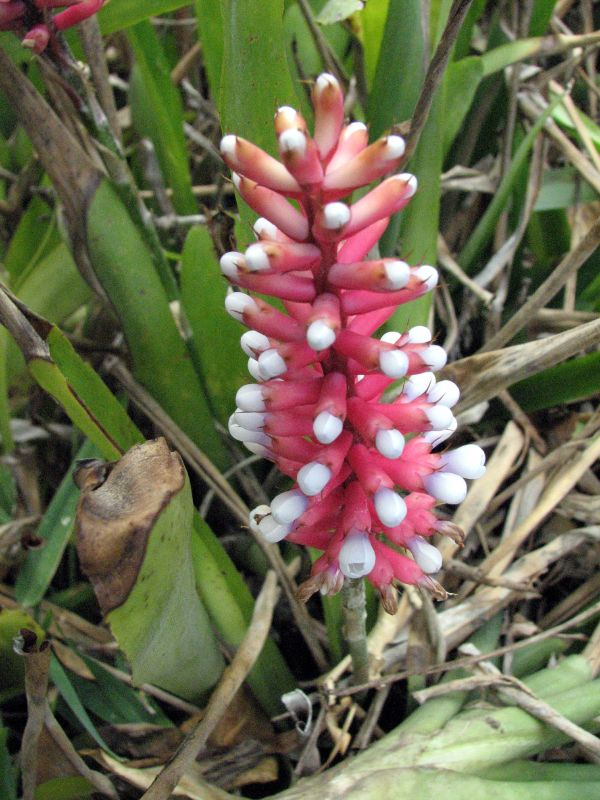

Scientific classification
- Kingdom: Plantae
- Clade: Tracheophytes
- Clade: Angiosperms
- Clade: Monocots
- Clade: Commelinids
- Order: Poales
- Family: Bromeliaceae
- Genus: Aechmea
- Subgenus: Aechmea subg. Ortgiesia
- Species: A. gamosepala

Binomial name
- Aechmea gamosepala Wittm.

Synonyms
- Ortgiesia gamosepala (Wittm.) L.B.Sm. & W.J.Kress

= Aechmea gamosepala =

Species of flowering plant

Aechmea gamosepala is a bromeliad endemic to southern Brazil. It is often cultivated as an ornamental plant. This plant is cited in Flora Brasiliensis by Carl Friedrich Philipp von Martius

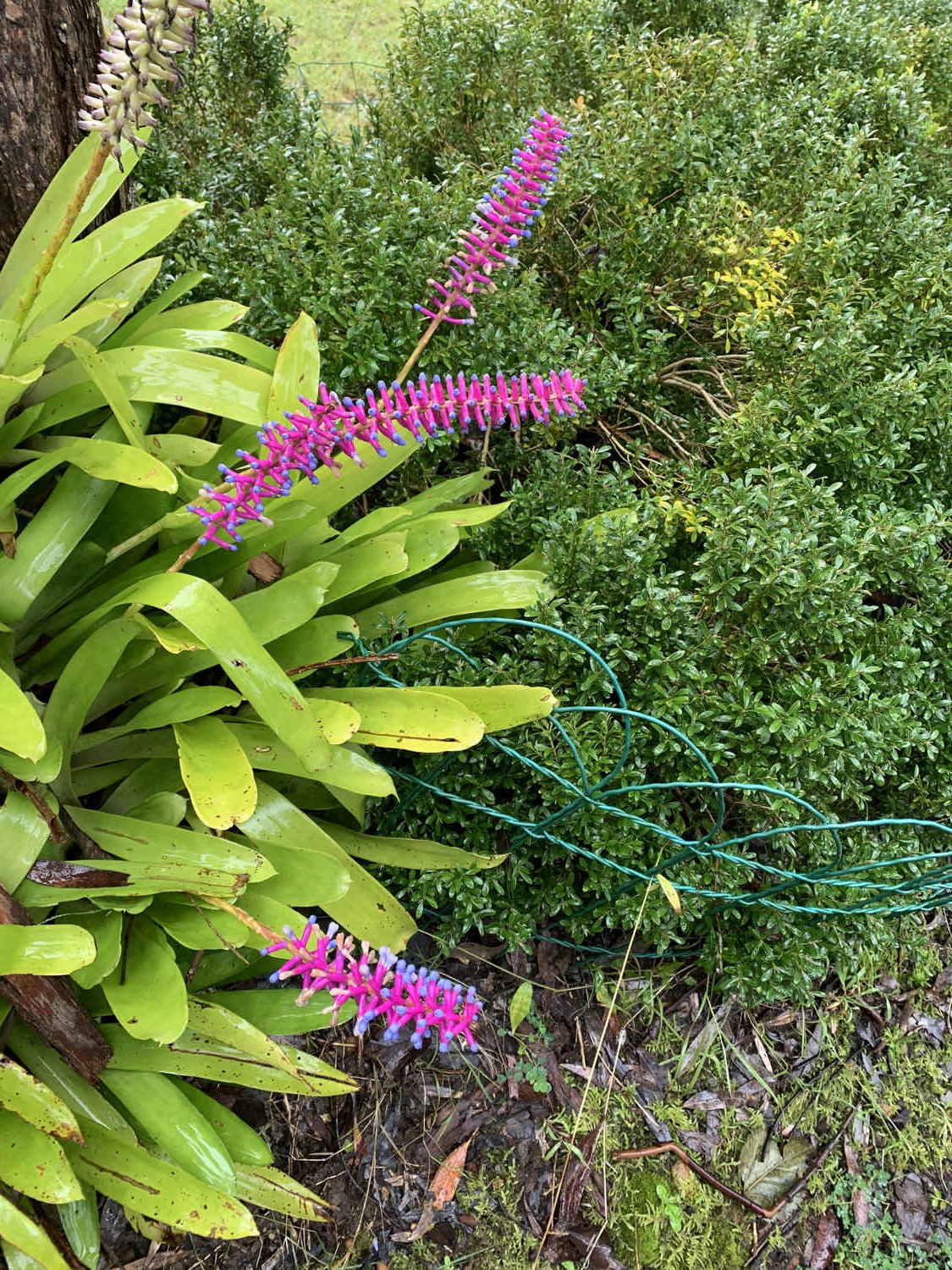
Aechmea gamosepala growing in a subtropical garden in New South Wales, Australia. The upright inflorescence with pink bracts and purple-blue flowers emerges from a rosette of green leaves.

The following varieties are recognized :

1. Aechmea gamosepala var. gamosepala - from São Paulo State south to Rio Grande do Sul
2. Aechmea gamosepala var. nivea Reitz, 1962 - Santa Catarina
