= Couratari calycina =

Conservation status
- Vulnerable (IUCN 2.3)

Scientific classification
- Kingdom: Plantae
- Clade: Embryophytes
- Clade: Tracheophytes
- Clade: Spermatophytes
- Clade: Angiosperms
- Clade: Eudicots
- Clade: Asterids
- Order: Ericales
- Family: Lecythidaceae
- Genus: Couratari
- Species: C. calycina

Binomial name
- Couratari calycina Sandwith

Species of flowering plant

Couratari calycina is a species of woody plant in the family Lecythidaceae. It is found only in Guyana.
