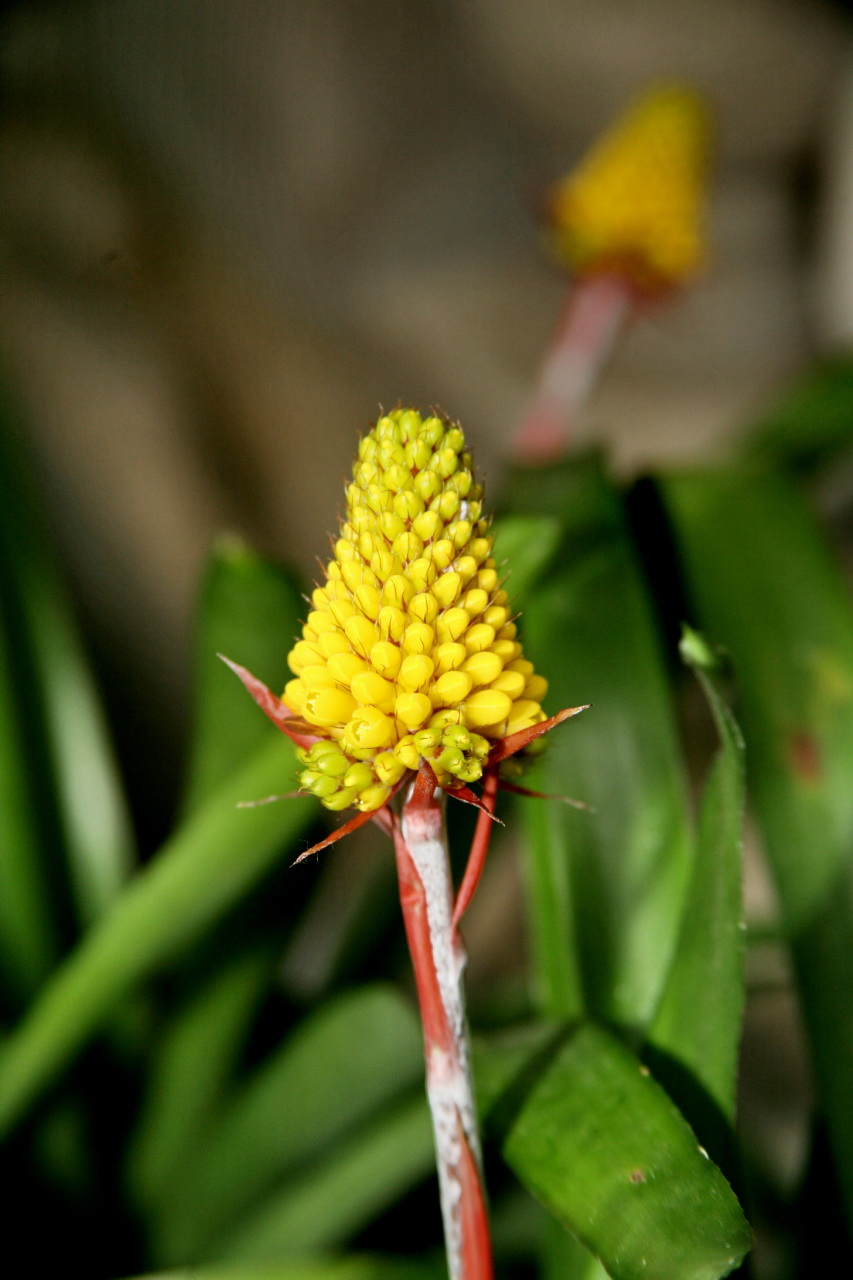

Scientific classification
- Kingdom: Plantae
- Clade: Tracheophytes
- Clade: Angiosperms
- Clade: Monocots
- Clade: Commelinids
- Order: Poales
- Family: Bromeliaceae
- Genus: Aechmea
- Subgenus: Aechmea subg. Ortgiesia
- Species: A. calyculata

Binomial name
- Aechmea calyculata (E.Morren) Baker

Synonyms
- Hoplophytum calyculatum E.Morren; Hohenbergia calyculata (E.Morren) Baker; Ortgiesia calyculata (E.Morren) L.B.Sm. & W.J.Kress; Macrochordion nudiusculum K.Koch; Macrochordion luteum Regel & Linden; Aechmea selloana Baker; Aechmea lutea (Regel & Linden) Voss; Aechmea thyrsigera Speg.; Aechmea gamosepala A.Cast.; Chevaliera thyrsigera (Speg.) Mez; Aechmea calyculata var. variegata Strehl

= Aechmea calyculata =

Species of plant

Aechmea calyculata is a species of flowering plant in the Bromeliaceae family.

== Distribution ==
The bromeliad is endemic to the Atlantic Forest biome (Mata Atlantica Brasileira). It is native to southern Brazil in the states of Paraná, Santa Catarina, and Rio Grande do Sul; and in eastern Argentina in Misiones province.

== Cultivars and hybrids ==
Cultivars and hybrids of Aechmea calyculata include:

- Aechmea 'Alaya'
- Aechmea 'Ann Vincent'
- Aechmea 'Gemma'
- Aechmea 'Len Butt'
- Aechmea 'Mini-Cal'
- Aechmea 'Phoenix'
- Aechmea 'Solo'
- × Nidumea 'Loeseneri'
