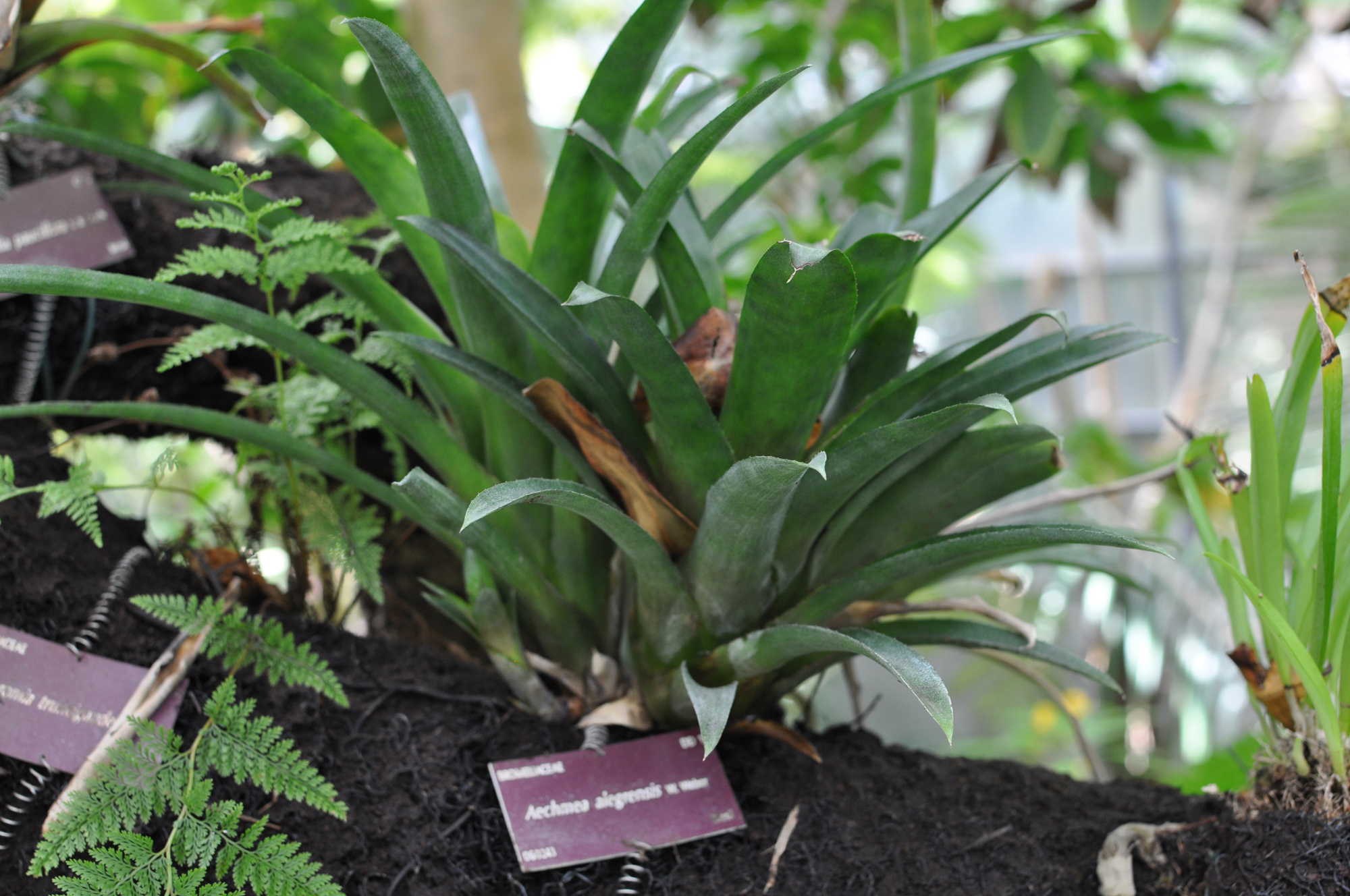

Scientific classification
- Kingdom: Plantae
- Clade: Tracheophytes
- Clade: Angiosperms
- Clade: Monocots
- Clade: Commelinids
- Order: Poales
- Family: Bromeliaceae
- Genus: Aechmea
- Subgenus: Aechmea subg. Ortgiesia
- Species: A. alegrensis

Binomial name
- Aechmea alegrensis W.Weber

Synonyms
- Ortgiesia alegrensis (W.Weber) L.B.Sm. & W.J.Kress

= Aechmea alegrensis =

Species of flowering plant

Aechmea alegrensis is a plant species in the genus Aechmea. It is endemic to the State of Espírito Santo in Brazil.
