= Couratari asterotricha =

Conservation status
- Critically Endangered (IUCN 2.3)

Scientific classification
- Kingdom: Plantae
- Clade: Tracheophytes
- Clade: Angiosperms
- Clade: Eudicots
- Clade: Asterids
- Order: Ericales
- Family: Lecythidaceae
- Genus: Couratari
- Species: C. asterotricha

Binomial name
- Couratari asterotricha Prance

Species of flowering plant

Couratari asterotricha, also known as imbirema, is a species of plant in the family Lecythidaceae. It is a critically endangered species endemic to Brazil.

== Distribution and habitat ==
C. asterotricha is known only from the type locality in Espírito Santo, Brazil.

== Description ==
C. asterotricha is a large tree growing to 31 m (102 ft) tall. The leathery leaves are oblong in shape, measuring 9–11.5 cm (3.5–4.5 in) long and 3–4.5 cm (1.2–1.8 in) wide with a pointed tip and wavy or slightly crenate edges. The inflorescence is a hairy raceme.
