= Aechmea organensis =

Scientific classification
- Kingdom: Plantae
- Clade: Tracheophytes
- Clade: Angiosperms
- Clade: Monocots
- Clade: Commelinids
- Order: Poales
- Family: Bromeliaceae
- Genus: Aechmea
- Subgenus: Aechmea subg. Ortgiesia
- Species: A. organensis

Binomial name
- Aechmea organensis Wawra

Synonyms
- Ortgiesia organensis (Wawra) L.B.Sm. & W.J.Kress; Aechmea nudicaulis var. microdon Baker; Aechmea caudata var. eipperi Reitz

Species of flowering plant

Aechmea organensis is a plant species in the genus Aechmea. This species is endemic to southeastern Brazil.

== Cultivars ==
The plant is widely cultivated as an ornamental. Cultivars include:

- Aechmea 'Chardonnay'
- Aechmea 'Christie March'
- Aechmea 'Coral Beauty'
- Aechmea 'Freckles'
- Aechmea 'Graceful'
- Aechmea 'Raymond Rocket'
