= Aechmea kertesziae =

Scientific classification
- Kingdom: Plantae
- Clade: Tracheophytes
- Clade: Angiosperms
- Clade: Monocots
- Clade: Commelinids
- Order: Poales
- Family: Bromeliaceae
- Genus: Aechmea
- Subgenus: Aechmea subg. Ortgiesia
- Species: A. kertesziae

Binomial name
- Aechmea kertesziae Reitz

Synonyms
- Ortgiesia kertesziae (Reitz) L.B.Sm. & W.J.Kress; Aechmea kertesziae var. viridiaurata Reitz; Ortgiesia kertesziae var. viridiaurata (Reitz) L.B.Sm. & W.J.Kress

Species of flowering plant

Aechmea kertesziae is a plant species in the genus Aechmea. This species is native to southern Brazil.
