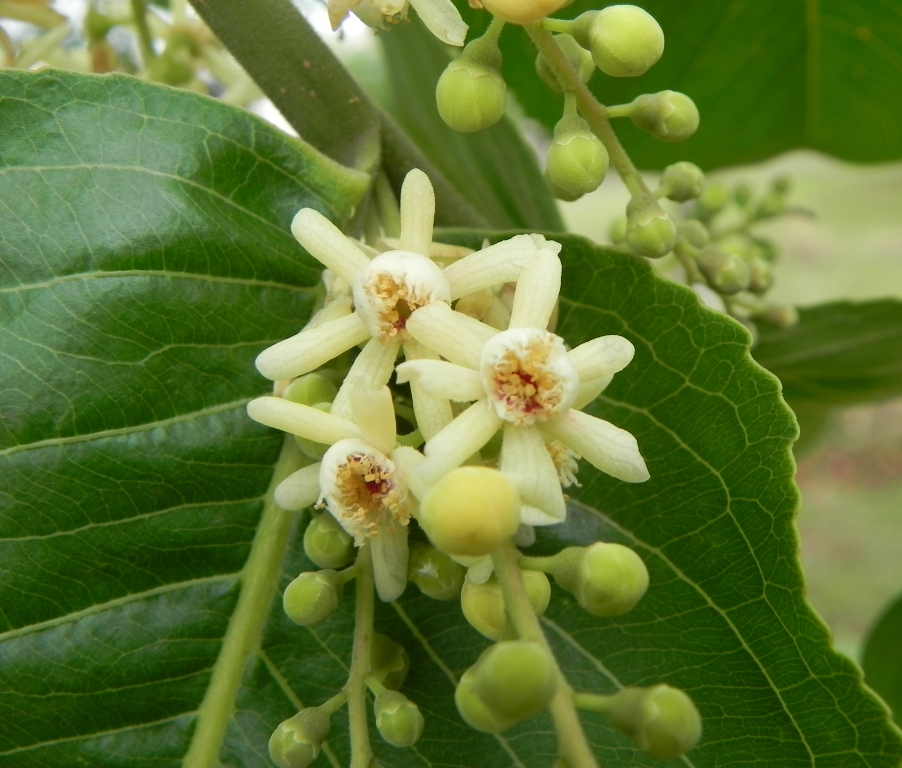
- Close up of flowers

Scientific classification
- Kingdom: Plantae
- Clade: Tracheophytes
- Clade: Angiosperms
- Clade: Eudicots
- Clade: Asterids
- Order: Ericales
- Family: Lecythidaceae
- Genus: Cariniana
- Species: C. estrellensis

Binomial name
- Cariniana estrellensis (Raddi) Kuntze

Synonyms
- Couratari estrellensis Raddi; Cariniana excelsa Casar.; Cariniana excelsa var. puberula Chodat & Hassl.; Couratari glaziovii Glaz.; Couratari excelsa Casar.

= Cariniana estrellensis =

Species of tree

Cariniana estrellensis is a species of rainforest tree in the family Lecythidaceae. It is native to South America. These trees can grow to extraordinary size. Perhaps the largest rainforest tree ever measured by college trained forester was a C. estrellensis measured by Edmundo Navarro de Andrade which was 22 m (72 ft) girth with no buttresses or basal swelling. Another individual measured by botanical explorer David G. Fairchild and Barbour Lathrop on the Bergon Coffee Estate near São Paulo was 6 m (20 ft) diameter at 1.8 m above the soil level, and had a fallen limb 1.2 m (3 ft 11 in) thick and 15 m (49 ft) long.
