= Couratari prancei =

Conservation status
- Data Deficient (IUCN 3.1)

Scientific classification
- Kingdom: Plantae
- Clade: Tracheophytes
- Clade: Angiosperms
- Clade: Eudicots
- Clade: Asterids
- Order: Ericales
- Family: Lecythidaceae
- Genus: Couratari
- Species: C. prancei

Binomial name
- Couratari prancei W.A.Rodrigues

Species of plant

Couratari prancei is a species of flowering plant in the family Lecythidaceae. It is known only from Acre state in northwestern Brazil. It grows up to 30 meters tall in terra firme Amazon rainforest. It is threatened by habitat loss.

The species was first described by William Antônio Rodrigues in 1974.
