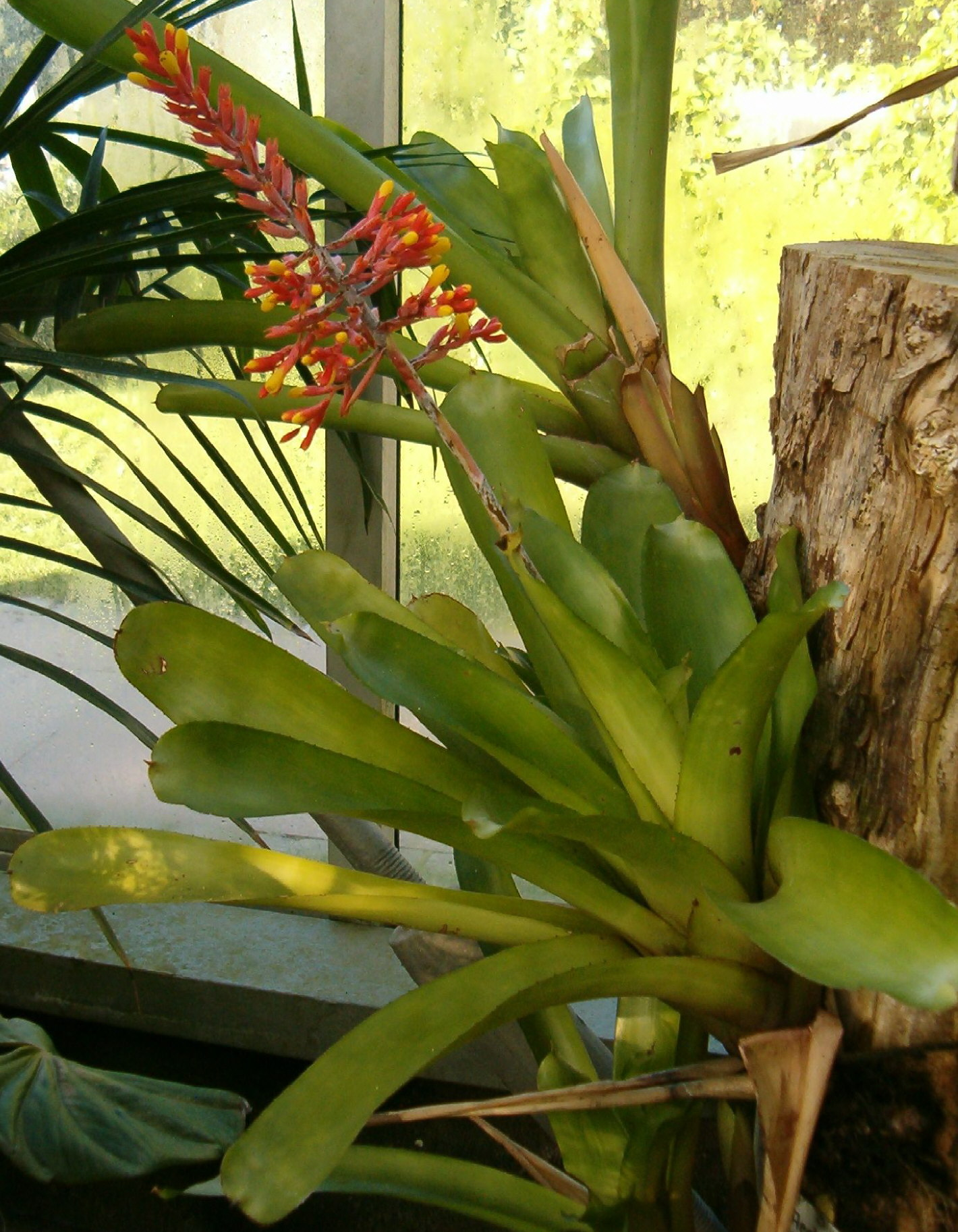

Scientific classification
- Kingdom: Plantae
- Clade: Tracheophytes
- Clade: Angiosperms
- Clade: Monocots
- Clade: Commelinids
- Order: Poales
- Family: Bromeliaceae
- Genus: Aechmea
- Subgenus: Aechmea subg. Ortgiesia
- Species: A. caudata

Binomial name
- Aechmea caudata Lindman

Synonyms
- Ortgiesia caudata (Lindm.) L.B.Sm. & W.J.Kress; Hoplophytum platzmannii E.Morren; Hoplophytum luteum E.Morren ex Baker; Aechmea henningsiana Wittm.; Aechmea platzmannii Wittm.; Aechmea caudata var. variegata M.B.Foster; Aechmea caudata f. albiflora W.Weber & Roeth; Ortgiesia caudata f. albiflora (W.Weber & Roeth) L.B.Sm. & W.J.Kress

= Aechmea caudata =

Species of flowering plant

Aechmea caudata is a species of flowering plant in the family Bromeliaceae. This species is native to southeastern Brazil from Espírito Santo to Rio Grande do Sul.

== Cultivars ==
Cultivars include:

- Aechmea 'Ann Vincent'
- Aechmea 'Blotches'
- Aechmea 'Blue Tip(s)'
- Aechmea 'Brett Terrace'
- Aechmea 'Fascidata'
- Aechmea 'Fire Chief'
- Aechmea 'Fireworks'
- Aechmea 'Gotha'
- Aechmea 'Mary Brett'
- Aechmea 'Melanocrater'
- Aechmea 'Pioneer'
- Aechmea 'Roman Candle'
- Aechmea 'Sao Paulo'
- Aechmea 'Sarah'
- Aechmea 'Scarlet Gem'
