= Couratari asterophora =

Conservation status
- Critically Endangered (IUCN 2.3)

Scientific classification
- Kingdom: Plantae
- Clade: Tracheophytes
- Clade: Angiosperms
- Clade: Eudicots
- Clade: Asterids
- Order: Ericales
- Family: Lecythidaceae
- Genus: Couratari
- Species: C. asterophora

Binomial name
- Couratari asterophora Rizzini

Species of flowering plant

Couratari asterophora is a species of flowering plant in the family Lecythidaceae. It is a tree endemic to southern Bahia state in northeastern Brazil. It is threatened by habitat loss.

The species was first described by Carlos Toledo Rizzini in 1976.
