= Couratari sandwithii =

Conservation status
- Vulnerable (IUCN 3.1)

Scientific classification
- Kingdom: Plantae
- Clade: Tracheophytes
- Clade: Angiosperms
- Clade: Eudicots
- Clade: Asterids
- Order: Ericales
- Family: Lecythidaceae
- Genus: Couratari
- Species: C. sandwithii

Binomial name
- Couratari sandwithii Prance

Species of flowering plant

Couratari sandwithii is a species of woody plant in the family Lecythidaceae. It is found in Suriname and Venezuela.
