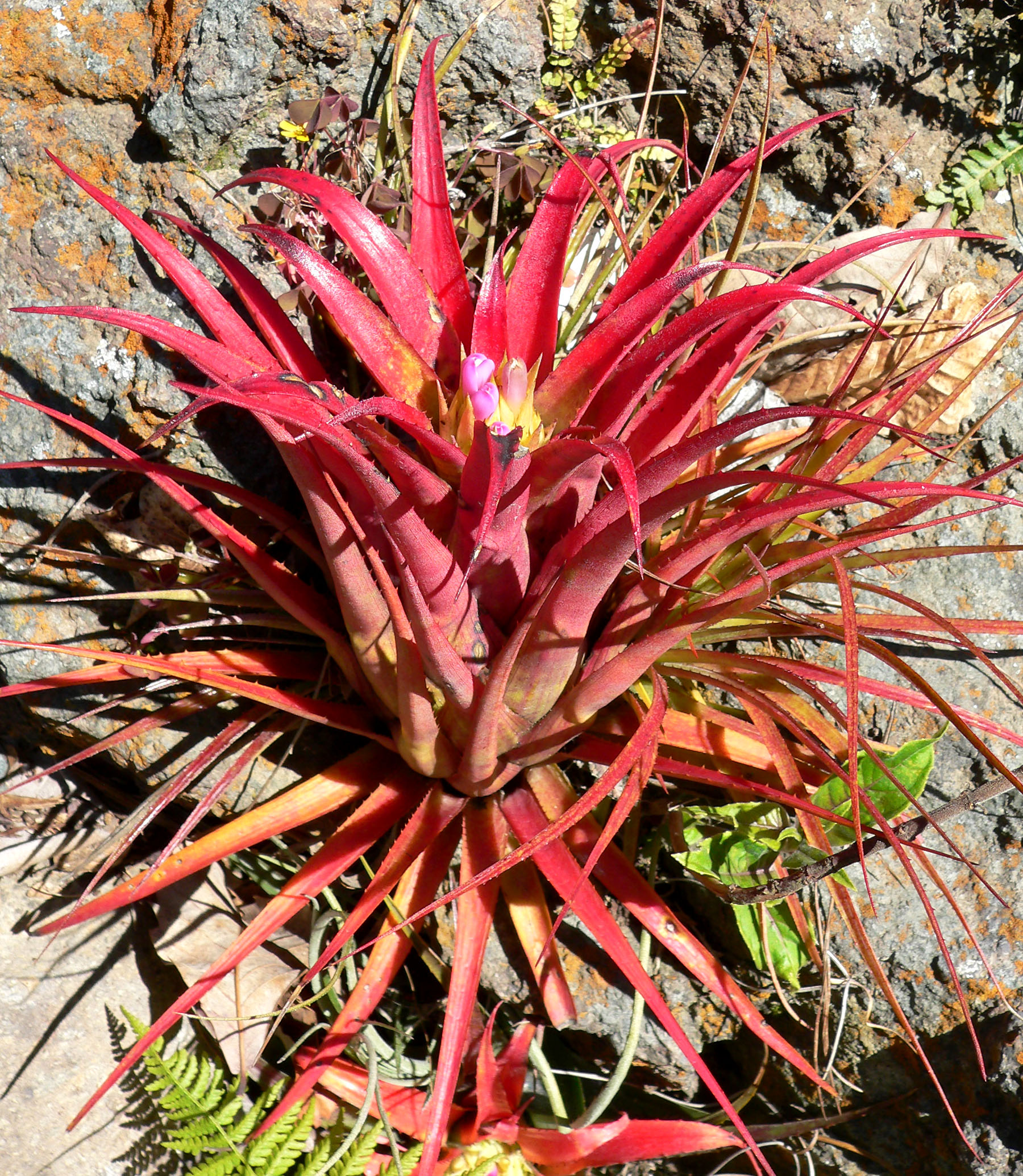
- Aechmea recurvata var. ortgiesii
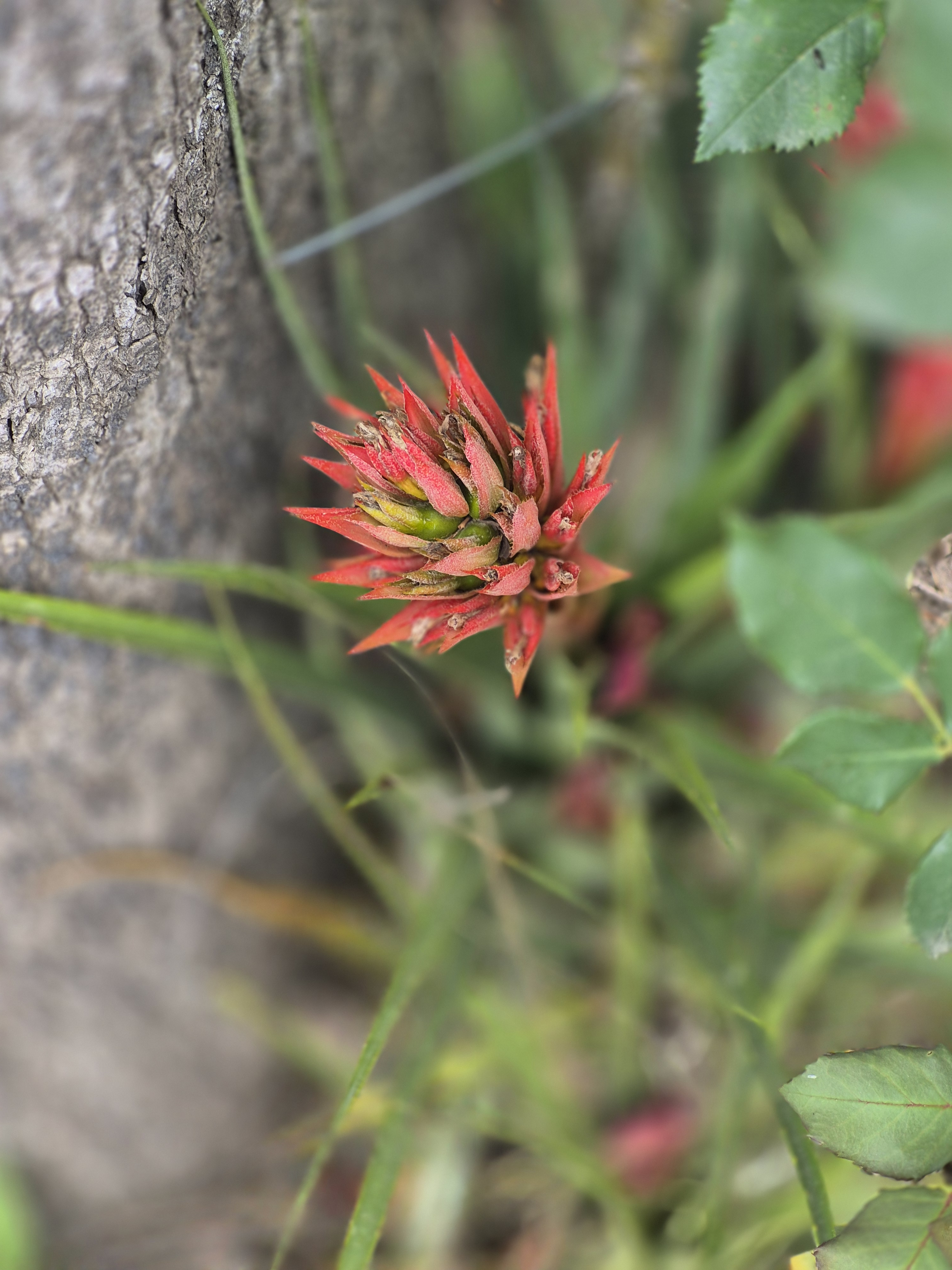
- Unidentified variety

Scientific classification
- Kingdom: Plantae
- Clade: Tracheophytes
- Clade: Angiosperms
- Clade: Monocots
- Clade: Commelinids
- Order: Poales
- Family: Bromeliaceae
- Genus: Aechmea
- Subgenus: Aechmea subg. Ortgiesia
- Species: A. recurvata

Binomial name
- Aechmea recurvata (Klotzsch) L.B. Smith

Synonyms
- Macrochordion recurvatum Klotzsch; Ortgiesia recurvata (Klotzsch) L.B.Sm. & W.J.Kress; Aechmea benrathii Mez; Aechmea rupestris F.Muell. ex Ule; Aechmea ortgiesii Baker

= Aechmea recurvata =

Species of flowering plant

Aechmea recurvata is a plant species in the genus Aechmea. This species is native to southern Brazil, Paraguay, Uruguay and northern Argentina.

== Varieties ==
Three varieties are recognized:

1. Aechmea recurvata var. benrathii (Mez) Reitz - Santa Catarina
2. Aechmea recurvata var. ortgiesii (Baker) Reitz - São Paulo
3. Aechmea recurvata var. recurvata - most of species range

== Cultivars ==
The species is widely cultivated as an ornamental. Many cultivars are recorded, including

- Aechmea 'A l'Orange'
- Aechmea 'Ametista'
- Aechmea 'Angulation'
- Aechmea 'Avarua'
- Aechmea 'Blue Bonnet'
- Aechmea 'Blue Imp'
- Aechmea 'Blue Pacific'
- Aechmea 'Brett Terrace'
- Aechmea 'Bronze Age'
- Aechmea 'Cardinalis'
- Aechmea 'Chardonnay'
- Aechmea 'Charles Hodgson'
- Aechmea 'Covata'
- Aechmea 'Covata Too'
- Aechmea 'Dee'
- Aechmea 'Donna Marie'
- Aechmea 'Echidna'
- Aechmea 'Flame'
- Aechmea 'Flaming Star'
- Aechmea 'Gemma'
- Aechmea 'Grapehead'
- Aechmea 'Karamea Topsy'
- Aechmea 'Kiwi Baker'
- Aechmea 'Light Rays'
- Aechmea 'Lotus'
- Aechmea 'Mary Brett'
- Aechmea 'Orangeade'
- Aechmea 'Paraguay'
- Aechmea 'Phoenix'
- Aechmea 'Pica'
- Aechmea 'Royal Robe'
- Aechmea 'Saturn'
- Aechmea 'Suave'
- Aechmea 'Sunrays'
- Aechmea 'Sunrise'
- Aechmea 'Tokuri'
- Aechmea 'Yellow Throat'
- × Billmea 'Barbara Ellen'
- × Billmea 'Casper'
- × Billmea 'Curlylocks'
- × Billmea 'Rosebud'
- × Neomea 'Dennis'
- × Neomea 'Olympiad'
- × Neomea 'Peter Kearney'
- × Quesmea 'Flame'
