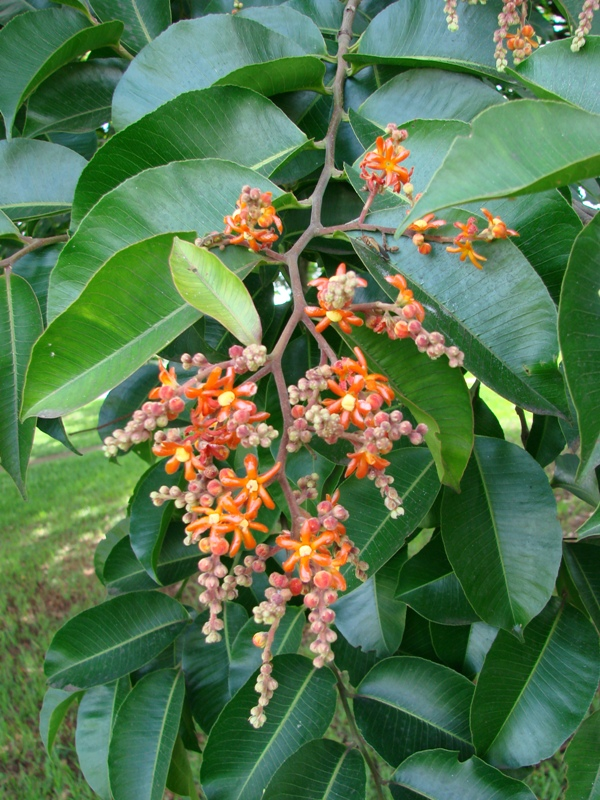

Conservation status
- Least Concern (IUCN 3.1)

Scientific classification
- Kingdom: Plantae
- Clade: Tracheophytes
- Clade: Angiosperms
- Clade: Eudicots
- Clade: Asterids
- Order: Ericales
- Family: Lecythidaceae
- Genus: Cariniana
- Species: C. rubra

Binomial name
- Cariniana rubra Gardner ex Miers

Synonyms
- Heterotypic Synonyms: Cariniana carajarum Toledo; Couratari rubra Gardner ex Miers

= Cariniana rubra =

Species of flowering plant

Cariniana rubra is a species of woody plant in the family Lecythidaceae. It is endemic to Brazil. It is sometimes referred to by the common names jequitibá-vermelho or cachimbo-de-macaco in Brazilian Portuguese.
