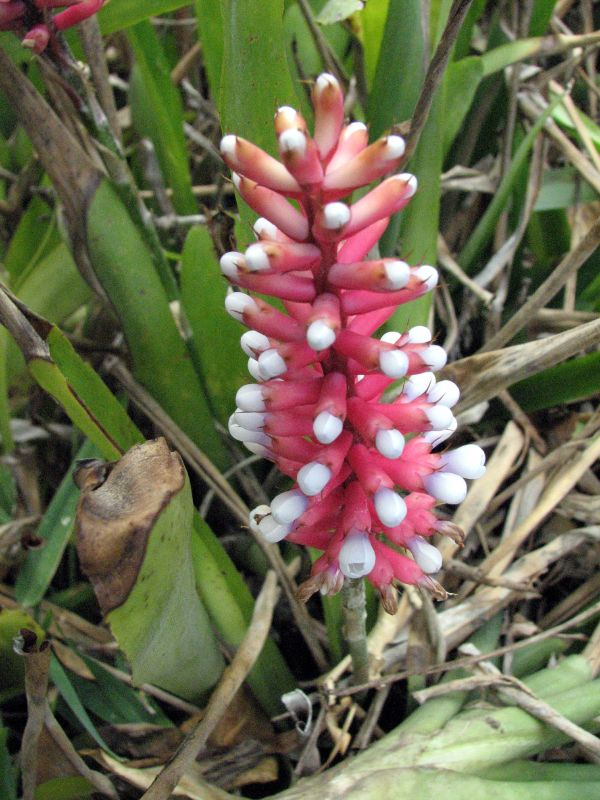
- Aechmea gamosepala

Scientific classification
- Kingdom: Plantae
- Clade: Tracheophytes
- Clade: Angiosperms
- Clade: Monocots
- Clade: Commelinids
- Order: Poales
- Family: Bromeliaceae
- Genus: Aechmea
- Subgenus: Aechmea subg. Ortgiesia (Regel) Mez

Species
- See text

= Aechmea subg. Ortgiesia =

Subgenus of flowering plants

Ortgiesia is a subgenus of the genus Aechmea.

== Species ==
Species accepted by Encyclopedia of Bromeliads as of October 2022:

Image	Scientific name	Distribution
	Aechmea alegrensis W.Weber	Espírito Santo in Brazil
	Aechmea apocalyptica Reitz	Brazil (Paraná, Santa Catarina, and São Paulo)
	Aechmea blumenavii Reitz	Brazil (Santa Catarina)
	Aechmea calyculata (E. Morren) Baker	Brazil (Paraná, Santa Catarina, and Rio Grande do Sul), Argentina
	Aechmea candida E.Morren ex Baker	Brazil (Bahia, Espírito Santo, Santa Catarina and Rio Grande do Sul)
	Aechmea caudata Lindman	Brazil (Espírito Santo to Rio Grande do Sul)
	Aechmea coelestis (K.Koch) E.Morren	Brazil (Espírito Santo to Santa Catarina)
	Aechmea comata (Gaudichaud) Baker	southern Brazil
	Aechmea cylindrata Lindman	Brazil (São Paulo to Santa Catarina)
	Aechmea gamosepala Wittmack	southern Brazil
	Aechmea gracilis Lindman	Brazil (Rio de Janeiro State to Santa Catarina)
	Aechmea joannis T.Strehl	Brazil
	Aechmea kertesziae Reitz	southern Brazil
	Aechmea kleinii Reitz	Brazil
	Aechmea leonard-kentiana H.Luther & Leme	Brazil (Bahia)
	Aechmea lymanii W.Weber	Brazil (Bahia)
	Aechmea organensis Wawra	southeastern Brazil
	Aechmea pimenti-velosoi Reitz	Brazil (Santa Catarina)
	Aechmea recurvata (Klotzsch) L.B.Sm.	southern Brazil, Paraguay, Uruguay and northern Argentina
	Aechmea seideliana W.Weber	Brazil (Espirito Santo)
	Aechmea winkleri Reitz	Brazil (Rio Grande do Sul)
