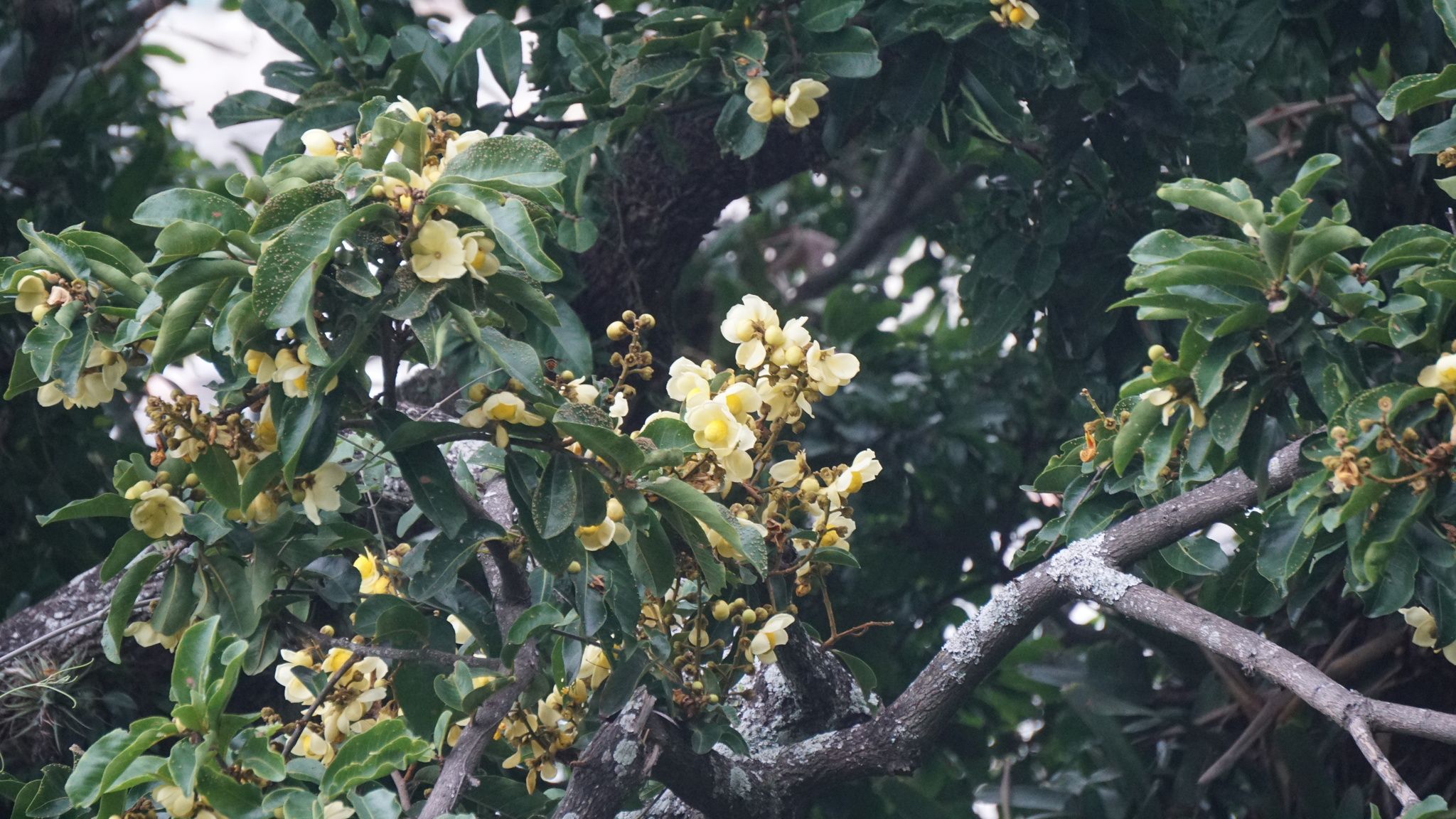
- Couratari pyramidata in Brazil

Scientific classification
- Kingdom: Plantae
- Clade: Embryophytes
- Clade: Tracheophytes
- Clade: Spermatophytes
- Clade: Angiosperms
- Clade: Eudicots
- Clade: Asterids
- Order: Ericales
- Family: Lecythidaceae
- Subfamily: Lecythidoideae
- Genus: Couratari; Aubl. 1775 not Cambess. 1858

Synonyms
- Curatari J.F.Gmel., spelling variant; Couratari Cambess.; Couratori Walp., spelling variant; Lecythopsis Schrank

= Couratari =

Genus of flowering plants

Couratari is a genus of trees in the family Lecythidaceae, first described as a genus in 1775. They are native to tropical South America and Central America.

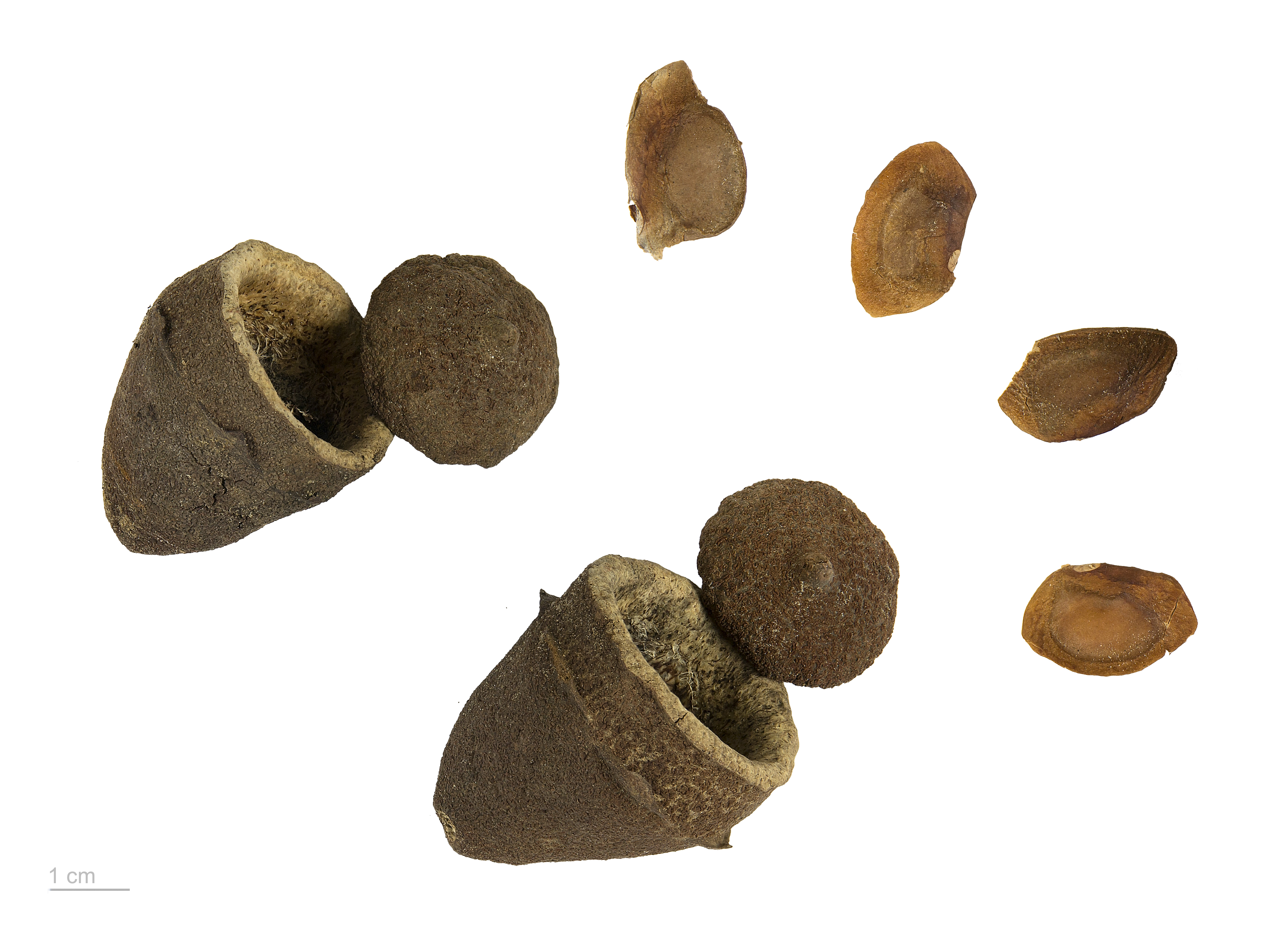
Couratari sp. - MHNT

They are large trees, often rising above the rainforest canopy. The leaves are evergreen, alternate, simple, elliptical, up to 15 cm long, with a serrate to serrulate margin. Vernation lines parallel to the midvein are often visible - a very unusual characteristic. The fruit is 6–15 cm long, and roughly conical. A central plug drops out at maturity, releasing the winged seeds to be dispersed by wind. The fruit of Cariniana may be distinguished from those of Couratari, as the former have longitudinal ridges, whereas the latter bears a single calyx-derived ring near the fruit apex.

== Species ==
19 species are accepted.

1. Couratari asterophora Rizzini - Brazil (Bahia)
2. Couratari asterotricha Prance - Brazil (Espírito Santo)
3. Couratari atrovinosa Prance - Brazil (Amazonas)
4. Couratari calycina Sandwith - Guyana, French Guiana
5. Couratari gloriosa Sandwith - Guyana, French Guiana, Suriname
6. Couratari guianensis Aubl. - Costa Rica, Panama, Colombia, Venezuela, Guyana, French Guiana, Suriname, Ecuador, Peru, Bolivia, Brazil (Amazonas, Acre, Rondônia, Amapá, Pará)
7. Couratari longipedicellata W.A.Rodrigues - Brazil (Amazonas)
8. Couratari macrosperma A.C.Sm. - Southern Peru, Bolivia (Pando), Brazil (Amazonas, Acre, Rondônia, Pará, Espírito Santo, Bahia, Mato Grosso)
9. Couratari multiflora Eyma - Guyana, French Guiana, Suriname, Brazil (Amazonas, Mato Grosso, Pará, Maranhão), Venezuela (Bolívar, Mérida, Delta Amacuro)
10. Couratari oblongifolia Ducke & R.Knuth - Guyana, French Guiana, Suriname, Brazil (Pará, Goiás, Maranhão, Roraima)
11. Couratari oligantha A.C.Sm. - Guyana, Vaupés, Peru, Venezuela (Amazonas), Brazil (Amazonas, Amapá)
12. Couratari prancei W.A.Rodrigues - Brazil (Acre)
13. Couratari pyramidata (Vell.) R.Knuth - Brazil (Minas Gerais, Rio de Janeiro)
14. Couratari riparia Sandwith - Guyana
15. Couratari sandwithii Prance - Venezuela (Bolívar), Suriname
16. Couratari scottmorii Prance - Costa Rica, Panama
17. Couratari stellata A.C.Sm. - Guyana, French Guiana, Suriname, Amazonas, Brazil (Amazonas, Pará), Colombia (Vaupés)
18. Couratari tauari O.Berg - Brazil (Amazonas, Pará)
19. Couratari tenuicarpa A.C.Sm. - Brazil (Amazonas, Pará, Rondônia), Venezuela (Bolívar), Peru (Loreto), Suriname
