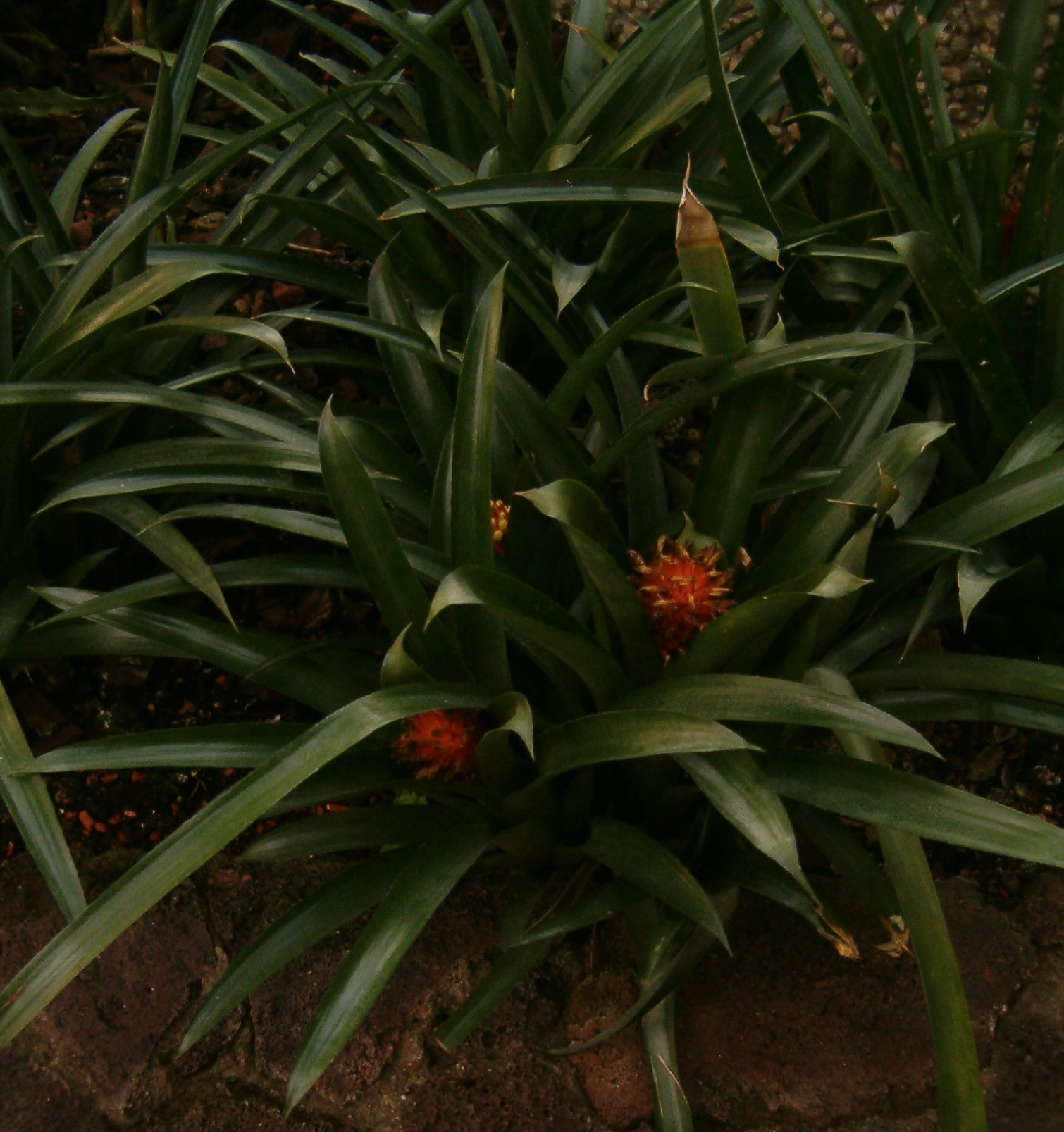

Scientific classification
- Kingdom: Plantae
- Clade: Tracheophytes
- Clade: Angiosperms
- Clade: Monocots
- Clade: Commelinids
- Order: Poales
- Family: Bromeliaceae
- Genus: Aechmea
- Subgenus: Aechmea subg. Ortgiesia
- Species: A. pimenti-velosoi

Binomial name
- Aechmea pimenti-velosoi Reitz

Synonyms
- Ortgiesia pimenti-velosoi (Reitz) L.B.Sm. & W.J.Kress; Aechmea pimenti-velosoi var. glabra Reitz; Ortgiesia pimenti-velosoi var. glabra (Reitz) L.B.Sm. & W.J.Kress

= Aechmea pimenti-velosoi =

Species of flowering plant

Aechmea pimenti-velosoi is a plant species in the genus Aechmea. It is endemic to the state of Santa Catarina in southern Brazil.

== Cultivars ==
- Aechmea 'Pie In the Sky'
