= Couratari atrovinosa =

Conservation status
- Endangered (IUCN 2.3)

Scientific classification
- Kingdom: Plantae
- Clade: Tracheophytes
- Clade: Angiosperms
- Clade: Eudicots
- Clade: Asterids
- Order: Ericales
- Family: Lecythidaceae
- Genus: Couratari
- Species: C. atrovinosa

Binomial name
- Couratari atrovinosa Prance

Species of flowering plant

Couratari atrovinosa is a species of flowering plant in the family Lecythidaceae. It is endemic to Brazil, where it is known only from Amazonas.
