= Aechmea lymanii =

Scientific classification
- Kingdom: Plantae
- Clade: Tracheophytes
- Clade: Angiosperms
- Clade: Monocots
- Clade: Commelinids
- Order: Poales
- Family: Bromeliaceae
- Genus: Aechmea
- Subgenus: Aechmea subg. Ortgiesia
- Species: A. lymanii

Binomial name
- Aechmea lymanii W.Weber

Synonyms
- Ortgiesia lymanii (W.Weber) L.B.Sm. & W.J.Kress

Species of flowering plant

Aechmea lymanii is a plant species in the genus Aechmea. This species is endemic to the State of Bahia in eastern Brazil.
