= Cariniana penduliflora =

Conservation status
- Data Deficient (IUCN 3.1)

Scientific classification
- Kingdom: Plantae
- Clade: Embryophytes
- Clade: Tracheophytes
- Clade: Spermatophytes
- Clade: Angiosperms
- Clade: Eudicots
- Clade: Asterids
- Order: Ericales
- Family: Lecythidaceae
- Genus: Cariniana
- Species: C. penduliflora

Binomial name
- Cariniana penduliflora Prance

Species of flowering plant

Cariniana penduliflora is a species of woody plant in the family Lecythidaceae. It is known from only a single specimen collected in Rondônia, Brazil.

== Taxonomy and history ==
Cariniana penduliflora was described by British botanist Ghillean Prance in 1976 based on a single specimen collected from an area of disturbed forest in Rondônia in November of 1968. The species is known only from this original specimen.
