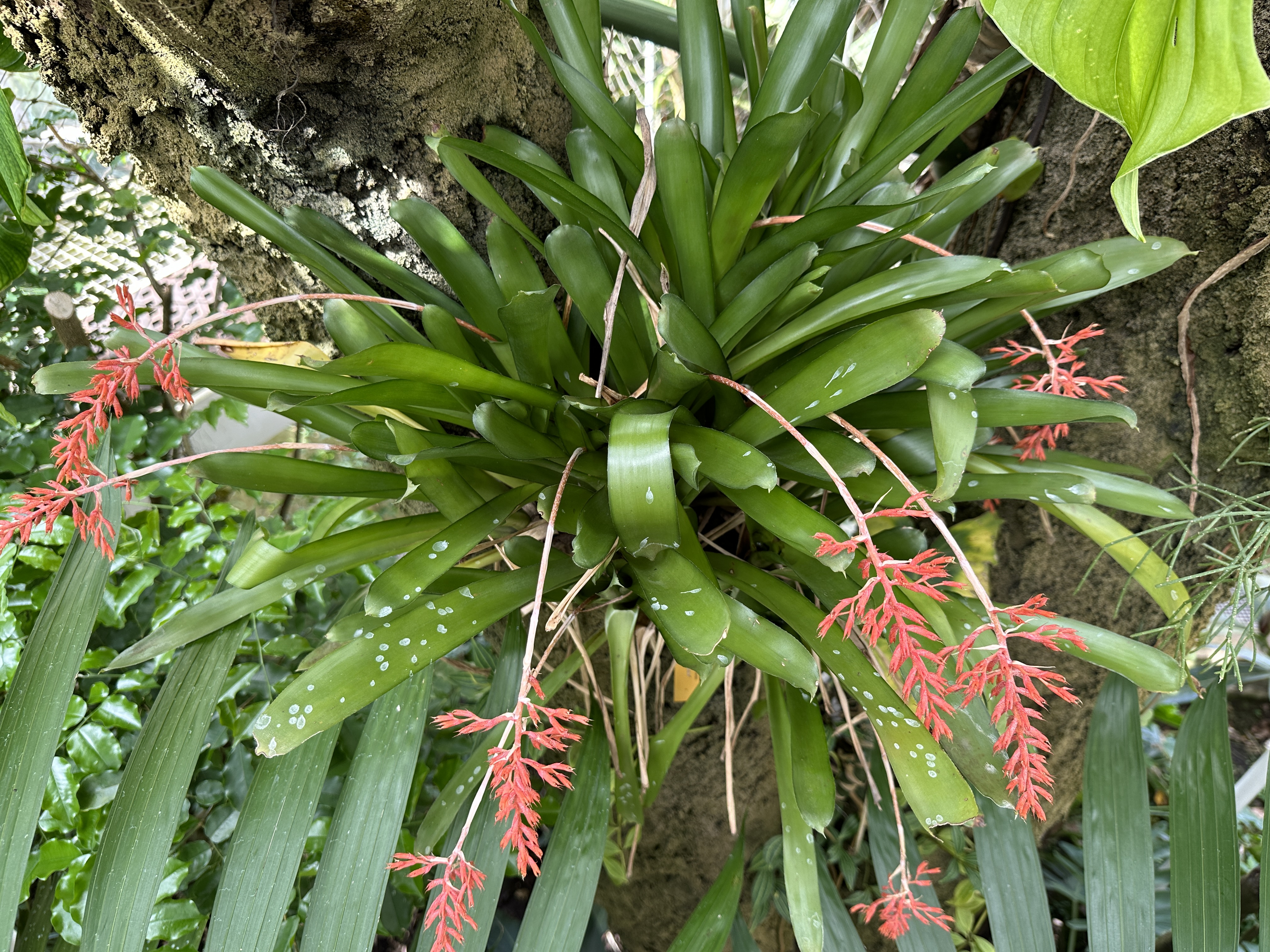

Scientific classification
- Kingdom: Plantae
- Clade: Tracheophytes
- Clade: Angiosperms
- Clade: Monocots
- Clade: Commelinids
- Order: Poales
- Family: Bromeliaceae
- Genus: Aechmea
- Subgenus: Aechmea subg. Ortgiesia
- Species: A. winkleri

Binomial name
- Aechmea winkleri Reitz

Synonyms
- Ortgiesia winkleri (Reitz) L.B.Sm. & W.J.Kress

= Aechmea winkleri =

Species of flowering plant

Aechmea winkleri is a plant species in the genus Aechmea. This species is endemic to the State of Rio Grande do Sul in southern Brazil. It is small and has leaves that sometimes look purple. The stem is red and has yellow flowers.
