= Cariniana ianeirensis =

Conservation status
- Endangered (IUCN 2.3)

Scientific classification
- Kingdom: Plantae
- Clade: Tracheophytes
- Clade: Angiosperms
- Clade: Eudicots
- Clade: Asterids
- Order: Ericales
- Family: Lecythidaceae
- Genus: Cariniana
- Species: C. ianeirensis

Binomial name
- Cariniana ianeirensis R.Knuth

Species of flowering plant

Cariniana ianeirensis is a species of woody plant in the family Lecythidaceae. It is native to the Atlantic Forest of Rio de Janeiro state in southeastern Brazil, and Santa Cruz Department of eastern Bolivia. In Brazil it is known from four collections in the forests of Tijuca and Itaocara. It is threatened by habitat loss, including from urban expansion of Rio de Janeiro.
