= Allantoma pachyantha =

Conservation status
- Data Deficient (IUCN 3.1)

Scientific classification
- Kingdom: Plantae
- Clade: Tracheophytes
- Clade: Angiosperms
- Clade: Eudicots
- Clade: Asterids
- Order: Ericales
- Family: Lecythidaceae
- Genus: Allantoma
- Species: A. pachyantha

Binomial name
- Allantoma pachyantha (A.C.Sm.) S.A.Mori, Ya Y.Huang & Prance

Synonyms
- Cariniana pachyantha A.C.Sm.

Species of flowering plant

Allantoma pachyantha, synonym Cariniana pachyantha, is a species of woody plant in the Lecythidaceae family. It is found only in Brazil.
