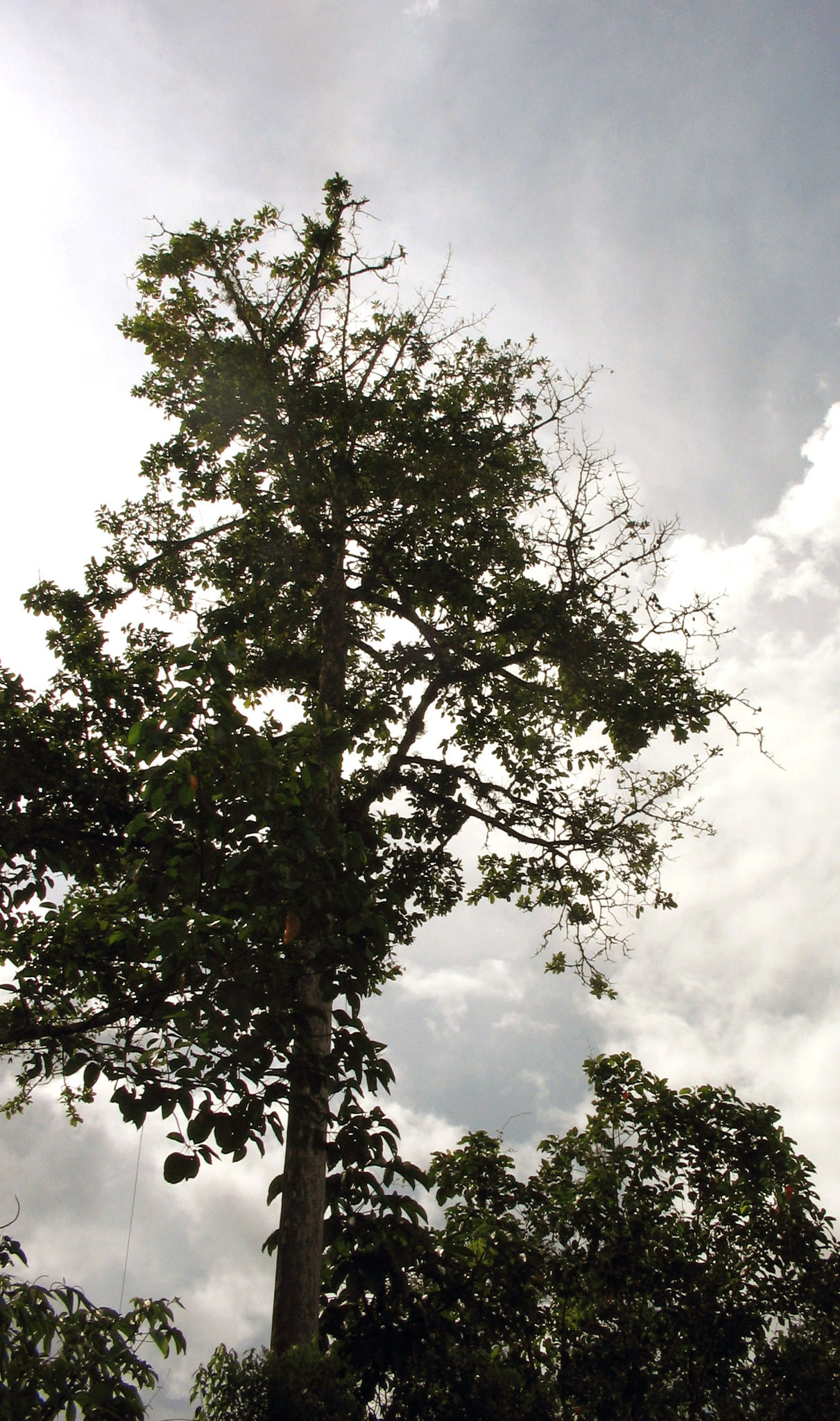

Conservation status
- Least Concern (IUCN 3.1)

Scientific classification
- Kingdom: Plantae
- Clade: Embryophytes
- Clade: Tracheophytes
- Clade: Spermatophytes
- Clade: Angiosperms
- Clade: Eudicots
- Clade: Asterids
- Order: Ericales
- Family: Lecythidaceae
- Genus: Couratari
- Species: C. guianensis

Binomial name
- Couratari guianensis Aubl.

= Couratari guianensis =

Species of flowering plant

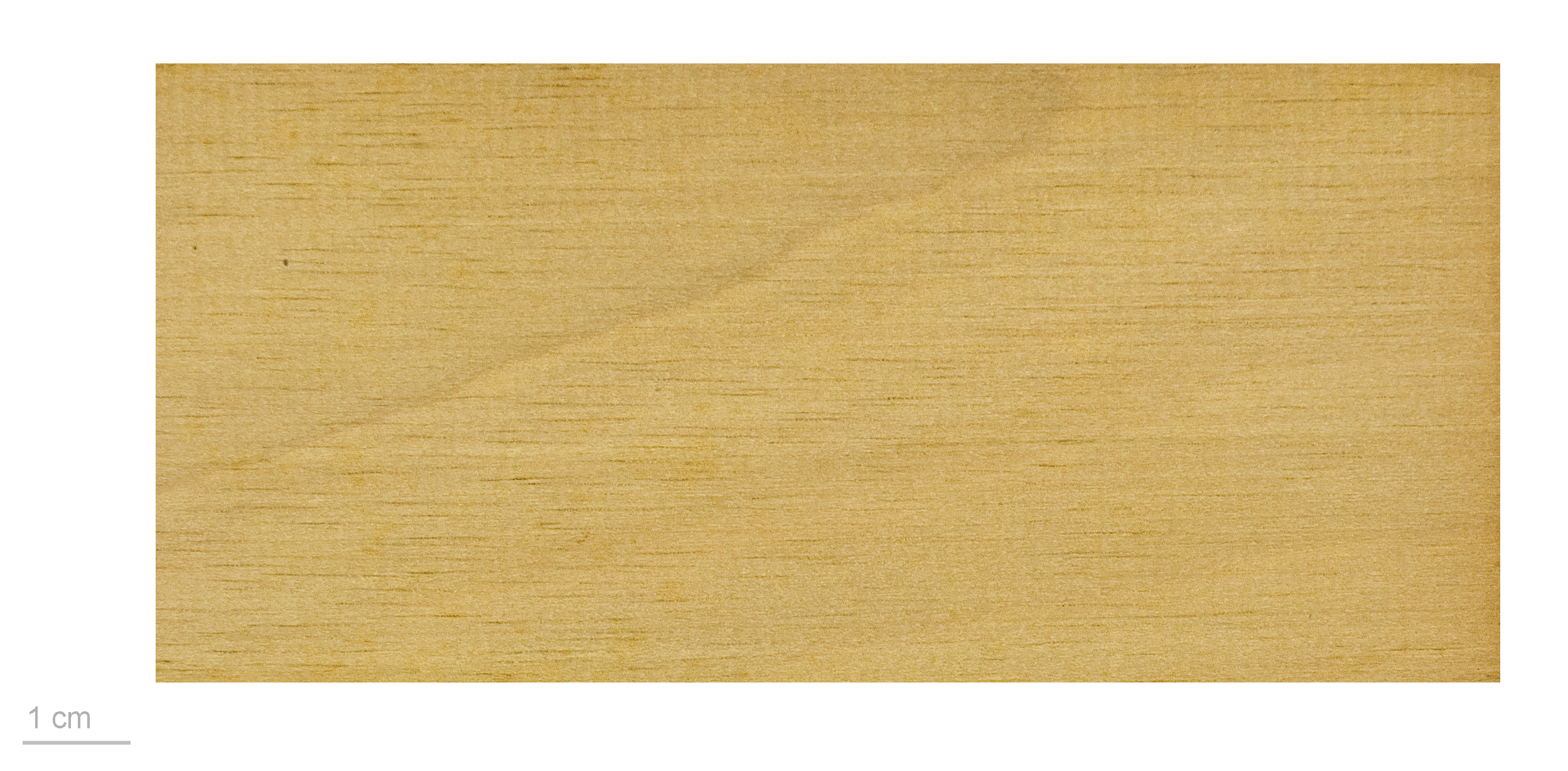
Couratari guianensis - MHNT

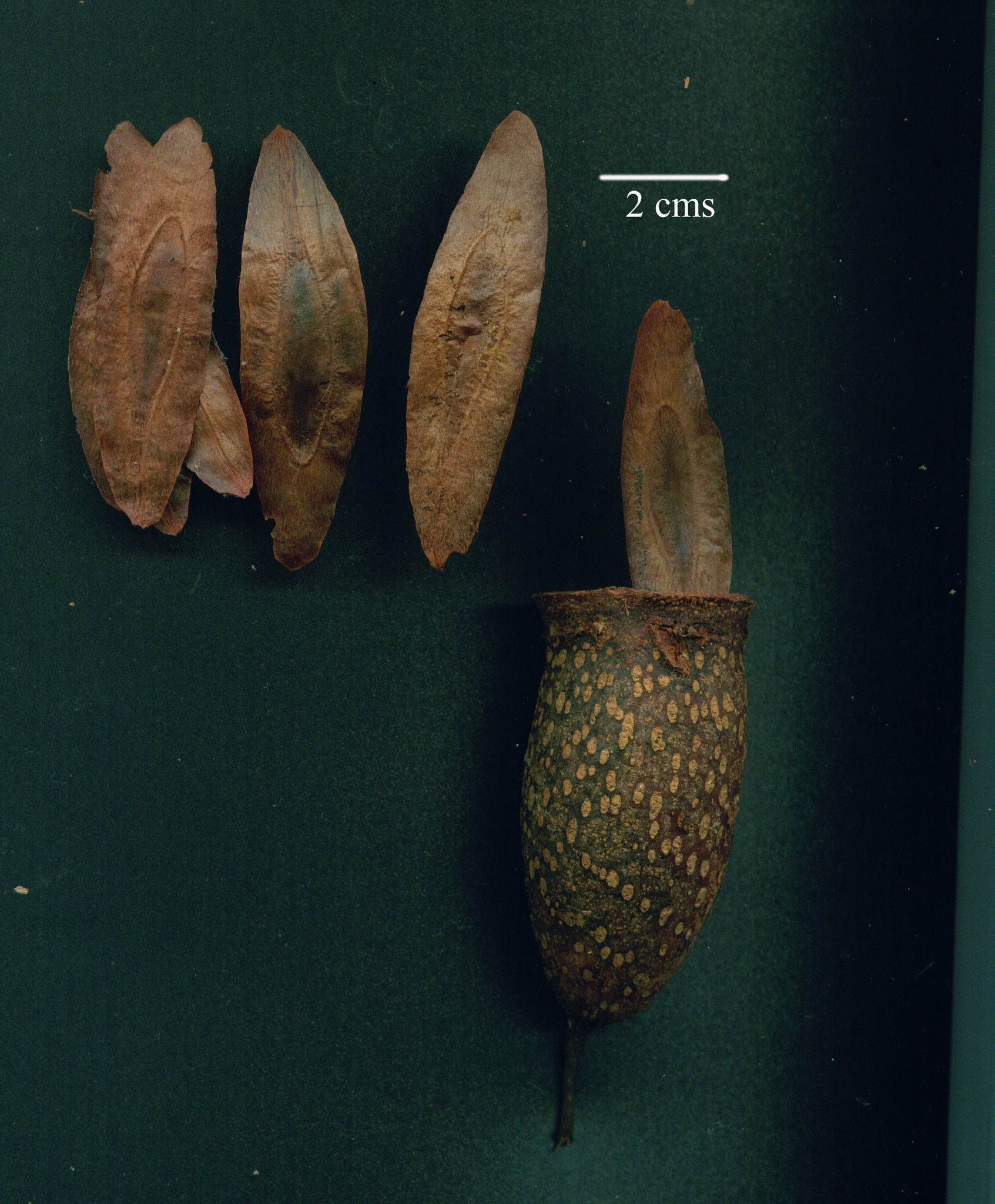
Seed pod and seeds

Couratari guianensis, the fine-leaf wadara, cachimbo caspi, cachimbo, capa de tabaco, coco cabuyo, or tauari, is a species of woody plant in the family Lecythidaceae. It is found in Brazil, Colombia, Costa Rica, French Guiana, Guyana, Panama, Peru, Suriname, and Venezuela.
