= Aechmea kleinii =

Scientific classification
- Kingdom: Plantae
- Clade: Tracheophytes
- Clade: Angiosperms
- Clade: Monocots
- Clade: Commelinids
- Order: Poales
- Family: Bromeliaceae
- Genus: Aechmea
- Subgenus: Aechmea subg. Ortgiesia
- Species: A. kleinii

Binomial name
- Aechmea kleinii Reitz

Synonyms
- Pothuava kleinii (Reitz) L.B.Sm. & W.J.Kress

Species of flowering plant

Aechmea kleinii is a plant species in the genus Aechmea. This species is endemic to southern Brazil, States of Santa Catarina and Rio Grande do Sul.
