= Aechmea apocalyptica =

Scientific classification
- Kingdom: Plantae
- Clade: Tracheophytes
- Clade: Angiosperms
- Clade: Monocots
- Clade: Commelinids
- Order: Poales
- Family: Bromeliaceae
- Genus: Aechmea
- Subgenus: Aechmea subg. Ortgiesia
- Species: A. apocalyptica

Binomial name
- Aechmea apocalyptica Reitz

Synonyms
- Ortgiesia apocalyptica (Reitz) L.B.Sm. & W.J.Kress

Species of flowering plant

Aechmea apocalyptica is a plant species in the genus Aechmea.

== Distribution ==
The Bromeliad is endemic to the Atlantic Forest ecoregion of southeastern Brazil, within Paraná (state), Santa Catarina (state), and São Paulo (state).

It is an IUCN Red List Critically endangered species.

== Ornamental plant ==
Aechmea apocalyptica is cultivated as an ornamental plant.

=== Cultivars ===
Named cultivars include:

- Aechmea 'Apocalypse Now'
- Aechmea 'Helen Dexter'
