= Allantoma pauciramosa =

Conservation status
- Endangered (IUCN 3.1)

Scientific classification
- Kingdom: Plantae
- Clade: Tracheophytes
- Clade: Angiosperms
- Clade: Eudicots
- Clade: Asterids
- Order: Ericales
- Family: Lecythidaceae
- Genus: Allantoma
- Species: A. pauciramosa

Binomial name
- Allantoma pauciramosa (W.A.Rodrigues) S.A.Mori, Ya Y.Huang & Prance

Synonyms
- Cariniana pauciramosa W.A.Rodrigues

Species of flowering plant

Allantoma pauciramosa, synonym Cariniana pauciramosa, is a species of flowering plant in the family Lecythidaceae. It is endemic to Brazil. It has only been collected once, in the rainforests in the state of Amazonas.
