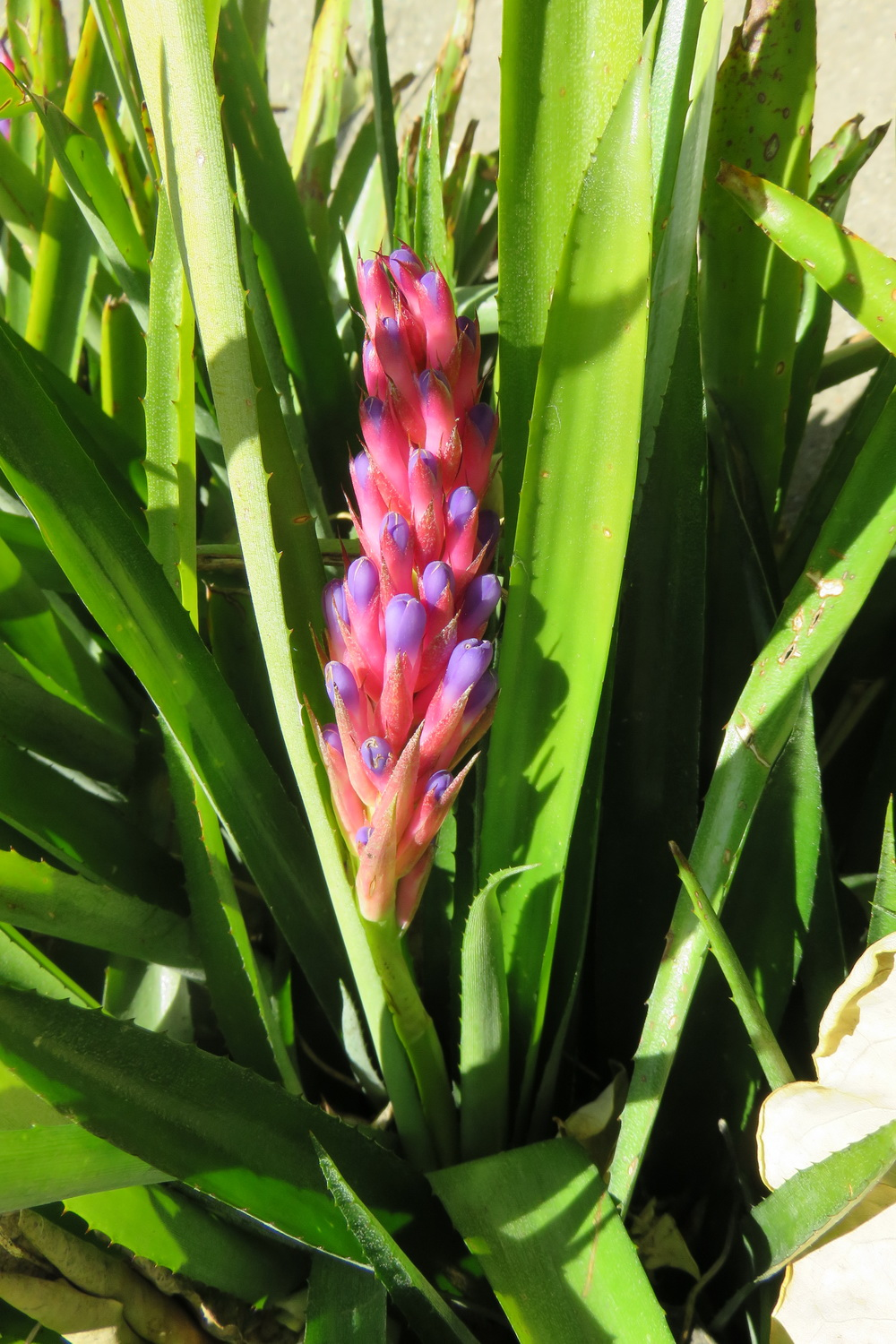

Scientific classification
- Kingdom: Plantae
- Clade: Tracheophytes
- Clade: Angiosperms
- Clade: Monocots
- Clade: Commelinids
- Order: Poales
- Family: Bromeliaceae
- Genus: Aechmea
- Subgenus: Aechmea subg. Ortgiesia
- Species: A. blumenavii

Binomial name
- Aechmea blumenavii Reitz

= Aechmea blumenavii =

Species of flowering plant

Aechmea blumenavii is a plant species in the genus Aechmea. This species is endemic to the state of Santa Catarina, in Brazil.

It is endangered and classified as rare by the IUCN.

Two varieties have been named, although var. alba has only been collected once:

- Aechmea blumenavii var. blumenavii
- Aechmea blumenavii var. alba
