= Allantoma =

Scientific classification
- Kingdom: Plantae
- Clade: Tracheophytes
- Clade: Angiosperms
- Clade: Eudicots
- Clade: Asterids
- Order: Ericales
- Family: Lecythidaceae
- Subfamily: Lecythidoideae
- Genus: Allantoma; Miers

Type species
- Allantoma torulosa Miers

Synonyms
- Goeldinia Huber

Genus of flowering plants

Allantoma is a genus of woody plant in the family Lecythidaceae first described as a genus in 1874. It is native to northwestern South America (Colombia, Venezuela, Peru, northern Brazil.

Species

1. Allantoma decandra (Ducke) S.A.Mori, Ya Y.Huang & Prance - Peru, Brazil
2. Allantoma integrifolia (Ducke) S.A.Mori - Amazonas State in Brazil
3. Allantoma kuhlmannii (Ducke) S.A.Mori - Rondônia State in Brazil
4. Allantoma lineata (Mart. ex O.Berg) Miers - Amazonas State in Venezuela; Amazonas and Pará States in Brazil
5. Allantoma pachyantha (A.C.Sm.) S.A.Mori, Ya Y.Huang & Prance - Amazonas State in Brazil
6. Allantoma pauciramosa (W.A.Rodrigues) S.A.Mori, Ya Y.Huang & Prance - Amazonas State in Brazil
7. Allantoma pluriflora S.A.Mori, Ya Y.Huang & Prance - Colombia
8. Allantoma uaupensis (Spruce ex O.Berg) S.A.Mori, Ya Y.Huang & Prance - Amazonas State in Brazil
