= Allantoma uaupensis =

Conservation status
- Data Deficient (IUCN 3.1)

Scientific classification
- Kingdom: Plantae
- Clade: Tracheophytes
- Clade: Angiosperms
- Clade: Eudicots
- Clade: Asterids
- Order: Ericales
- Family: Lecythidaceae
- Genus: Allantoma
- Species: A. uaupensis

Binomial name
- Allantoma uaupensis (Spruce ex O.Berg) S.A.Mori, Ya Y.Huang & Prance

Synonyms
- Amphoricarpus uaupensis Spruce ex Miers; Cariniana uaupensis (Spruce ex O.Berg) Miers; Couratari uaupensis Spruce ex O.Berg

Species of flowering plant

Allantoma uaupensis, synonym Cariniana uaupensis, is a species of woody plant in the Lecythidaceae family. It is found only in Brazil.
