= Allantoma integrifolia =

Conservation status
- Vulnerable (IUCN 2.3)

Scientific classification
- Kingdom: Plantae
- Clade: Tracheophytes
- Clade: Angiosperms
- Clade: Eudicots
- Clade: Asterids
- Order: Ericales
- Family: Lecythidaceae
- Genus: Allantoma
- Species: A. integrifolia

Binomial name
- Allantoma integrifolia (Ducke) S.A.Mori, Ya Y.Huang & Prance

Synonyms
- Cariniana integrifolia Ducke; Cariniana integrifolia var. ovatifolia Ducke ex R.Knuth

Species of flowering plant

Allantoma integrifolia, synonym Cariniana integrifolia, is a species of woody plant in the Lecythidaceae family. It is found only in Brazil. It is threatened by habitat loss.
