= Aechmea candida =

Conservation status
- Data Deficient (IUCN 3.1)

Scientific classification
- Kingdom: Plantae
- Clade: Tracheophytes
- Clade: Angiosperms
- Clade: Monocots
- Clade: Commelinids
- Order: Poales
- Family: Bromeliaceae
- Genus: Aechmea
- Subgenus: Aechmea subg. Ortgiesia
- Species: A. candida

Binomial name
- Aechmea candida E.Morren ex Baker

Synonyms
- Ortgiesia candida (E.Morren ex Baker) L.B.Sm. & W.J.Kress

Species of flowering plant

Aechmea candida, the white bromeliad, is a species of bromeliad in the genus Aechmea. This species is endemic to Brazil, where it can be found in Bahia, Espírito Santo, Santa Catarina and Rio Grande do Sul, from sea level up to 150 m elevation. It is an epiphyte found growing in rocky, moist and shady areas in the thick forests. It is threatened by agriculture, urban development and logging. It is found in protected areas of the Atlantic Forest, and is cultivated in a number of botanical institutions.
