= Carl Axel Magnus Lindman =

Swedish botanist and botanical artist

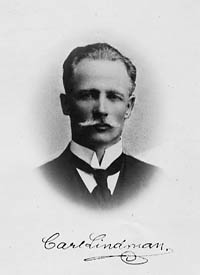

Carl Axel Magnus Lindman (6 April 1856 in Halmstad – 21 June 1928) was a Swedish botanist and botanical artist, the son of Carl Christian Lindman and Sophie Fredrique Löhr. He is best known for his work "Bilder ur Nordens Flora" published 1901-1905.

== Biography ==
His father died when Carl was a toddler, while his younger sister was born after the father's death. In 1864 his mother moved to Växjö with her two children, where Carl went to primary school. Despite his musical and artistic talents, his mother steered him away from such a career. He matriculated in 1874 and immediately enrolled at Uppsala University for botany and zoology. Ten years later he became associate Professor of Botany and Doctor of Philosophy. In 1887 Lindman started work as the Regnellian Amanuensis at the Swedish Museum of Natural History, spending some of his time as assistant in Bergius Botanic Garden and the rest as lecturer in Natural History and Physics at Högre Latinläroverket, a secondary school in Stockholm. In 1892 Lindman and Gustaf Malme were awarded the first Regnellian travel grant. After a voyage to Brazil and Paraguay, he resumed his post as lecturer. From 1896 to 1900 he tutored the sons of the crown prince (later Gustav V of Sweden). In 1905, Lindman was appointed Professor of Botany at the Swedish Museum of Natural History and filled this chair until his retirement in 1923. Lindman died on 21 June 1928 aged 72.

== Gallery ==
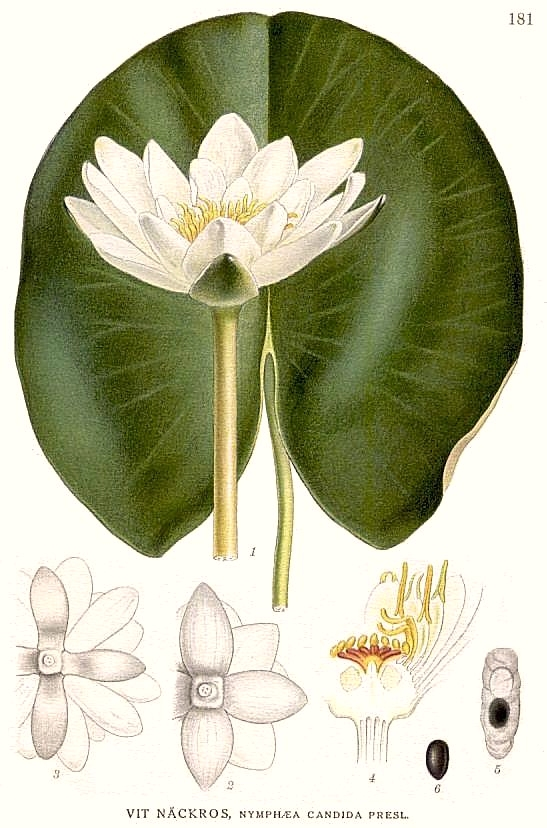
Nymphaea candida C.Presl.

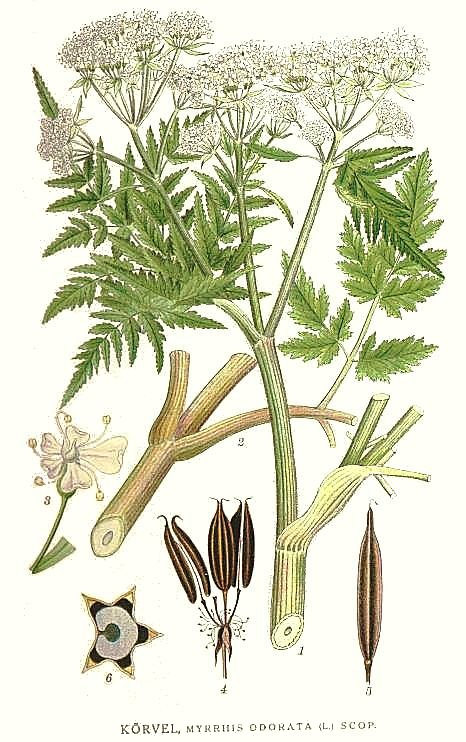
Myrrhis odorata (L.) Scop.
