= G. colombiana =

G. colombiana may refer to:

- Gibberula colombiana, a marine sea snail in the family Cystiscidae
- Grias colombiana, a species of woody plant in the family Lecythidaceae found only in Colombia

== See also ==
- Colombiana (disambiguation)
