= N. lutea =

N. lutea may refer to:

- Napoleonaea lutea, a woody plant
- Nauclea lutea, a tree with glossy leaves
- Nelima lutea, a daddy longlegs
- Nelumbo lutea, an aquatic plant
- Neoeromene lutea, a grass moth
- Neptunia lutea, a perennial plant
- Nomada lutea, a cuckoo bee
- Nudaurelia lutea, a large moth
- Nuphar lutea, an aquatic plant
