= Belvisia =

Belvisia may refer to:

- Belvisia, a genus of flowering plants in the family Lecythidaceae, synonym of Napoleonaea
- Belvisia, a genus of ferns in the family Polypodiaceae, synonym of Lepisorus
