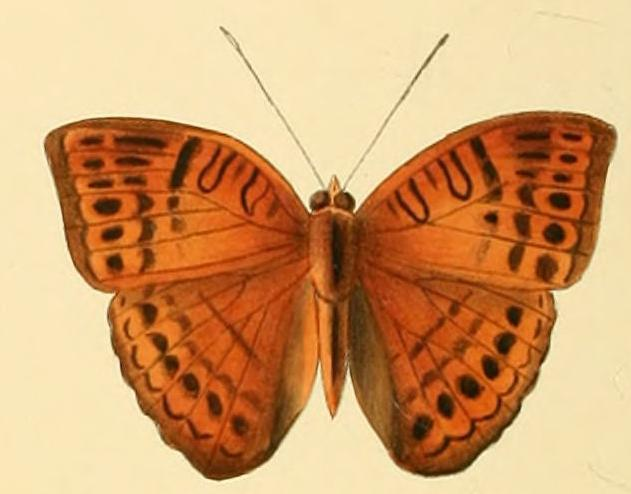

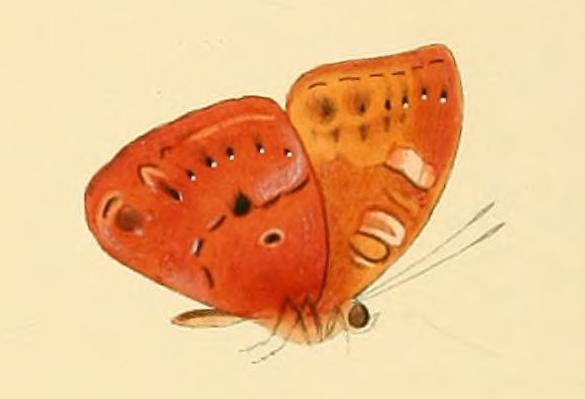

Scientific classification
- Kingdom: Animalia
- Phylum: Arthropoda
- Clade: Pancrustacea
- Class: Insecta
- Order: Lepidoptera
- Family: Nymphalidae
- Genus: Euriphene
- Species: E. amicia

Binomial name
- Euriphene amicia (Hewitson, 1871)

Synonyms
- Euriphene (Euriphene) amicia

= Euriphene amicia =

Species of butterfly

Euriphene amicia, the friendly nymph, is a butterfly in the family Nymphalidae. It is found in Sierra Leone, Liberia, Ivory Coast, Ghana, Togo, Nigeria, Cameroon, the Republic of the Congo and the Democratic Republic of the Congo. The habitat consists of forests.

The larvae feed on Napoleonaea vogelii. They are gregarious.

== Subspecies ==
- Euriphene amicia amicia (eastern Ivory Coast, Ghana, Nigeria, Cameroon, Congo, Democratic Republic of the Congo)
- Euriphene amicia gola Fox, 1965 (Sierra Leone, Liberia, western Ivory Coast)

Torben Larsen developed a species numbering system for his 2005 publication Butterflies of West Africa. The nominate subspecies is #968. The 'Larsen' numbers have since been used with permission in A Sharp Eye on Butterflies of Ghana.
