= Rhaptopetalum sindarense =

Conservation status
- Vulnerable (IUCN 2.3)

Scientific classification
- Kingdom: Plantae
- Clade: Tracheophytes
- Clade: Angiosperms
- Clade: Eudicots
- Clade: Asterids
- Order: Ericales
- Family: Lecythidaceae
- Genus: Rhaptopetalum
- Species: R. sindarense

Binomial name
- Rhaptopetalum sindarense Pellegrin

Species of flowering plant

Rhaptopetalum sindarense is a species of plant in the family Lecythidaceae. It is endemic to Gabon.
