= Rhaptopetalum geophylax =

Conservation status
- Near Threatened (IUCN 3.1)

Scientific classification
- Kingdom: Plantae
- Clade: Tracheophytes
- Clade: Angiosperms
- Clade: Eudicots
- Clade: Asterids
- Order: Ericales
- Family: Lecythidaceae
- Genus: Rhaptopetalum
- Species: R. geophylax

Binomial name
- Rhaptopetalum geophylax Cheek & Gosline

Species of flowering plant

Rhaptopetalum geophylax is a species of plant in the family Lecythidaceae. It is endemic to Cameroon. Its natural habitat is subtropical or tropical moist lowland forests. It is threatened by habitat loss.
