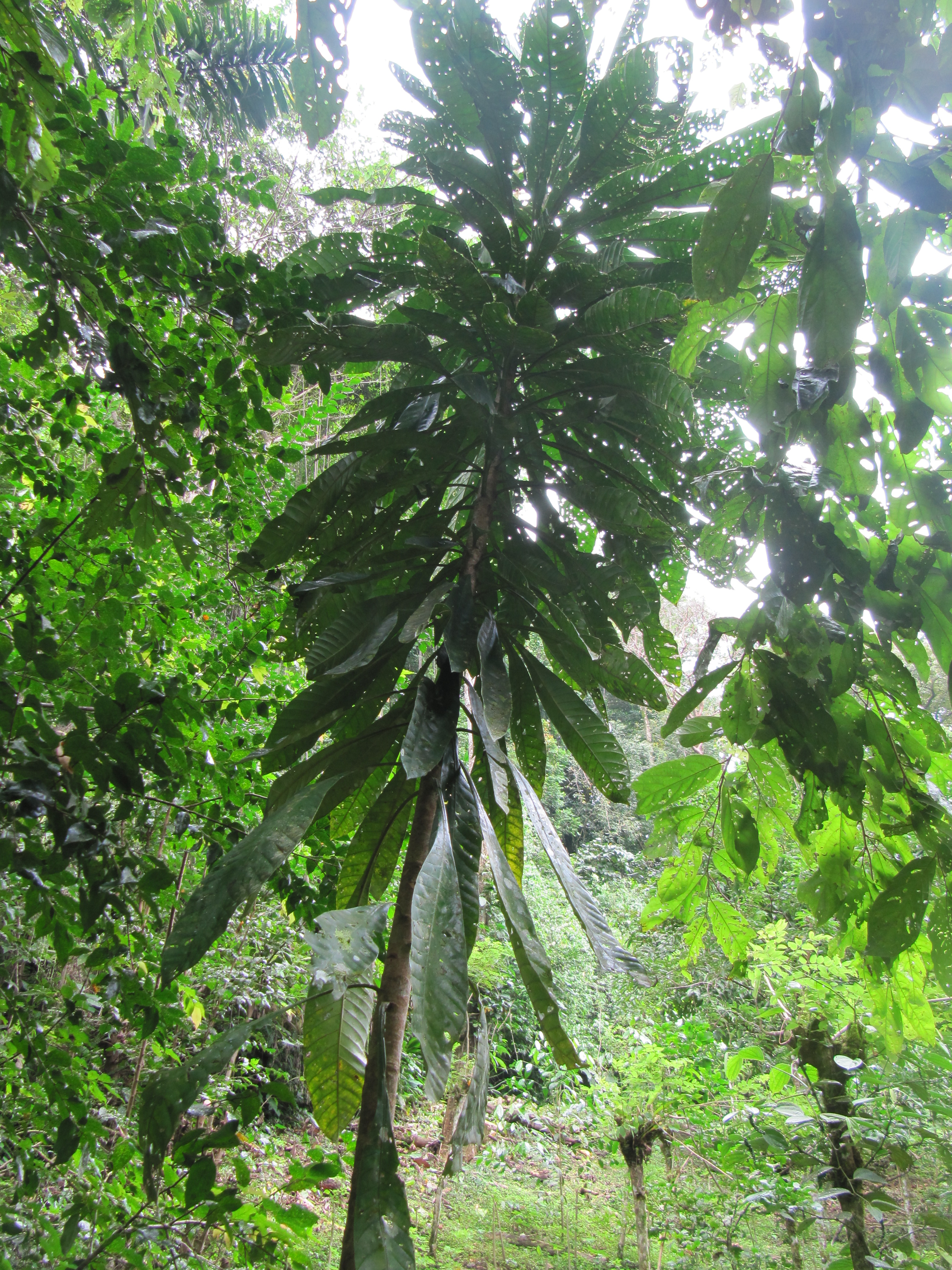
- At Finca la Isla Botanical Garden near Puerto Viejo de Talamanca, Costa Rica

Conservation status
- Least Concern (IUCN 3.1)

Scientific classification
- Kingdom: Plantae
- Clade: Embryophytes
- Clade: Tracheophytes
- Clade: Spermatophytes
- Clade: Angiosperms
- Clade: Eudicots
- Clade: Asterids
- Order: Ericales
- Family: Lecythidaceae
- Genus: Grias
- Species: G. haughtii

Binomial name
- Grias haughtii R. Knuth

= Grias haughtii =

Species of flowering plant

Grias haughtii is a species of woody plant in the Monkeypot family Lecythidaceae. It is found only in Colombia in non-flooded lowland forests. Its most remarkable feature is its leaves, which can be up to 5.5 feet (170 centimeters) in length by 16.5 inches (42 centimeters) in width. It also produces exceptionally large seeds, up to 2.7 inches (69 mm) in length by one inch (25 mm) in diameter.
