= Rhaptopetalum belingense =

Conservation status
- Endangered (IUCN 3.1)

Scientific classification
- Kingdom: Plantae
- Clade: Tracheophytes
- Clade: Angiosperms
- Clade: Eudicots
- Clade: Asterids
- Order: Ericales
- Family: Lecythidaceae
- Genus: Rhaptopetalum
- Species: R. belingense

Binomial name
- Rhaptopetalum belingense Letouzey

Species of flowering plant

Rhaptopetalum belingense is a species of plant in the family Lecythidaceae. It is endemic to Gabon.
