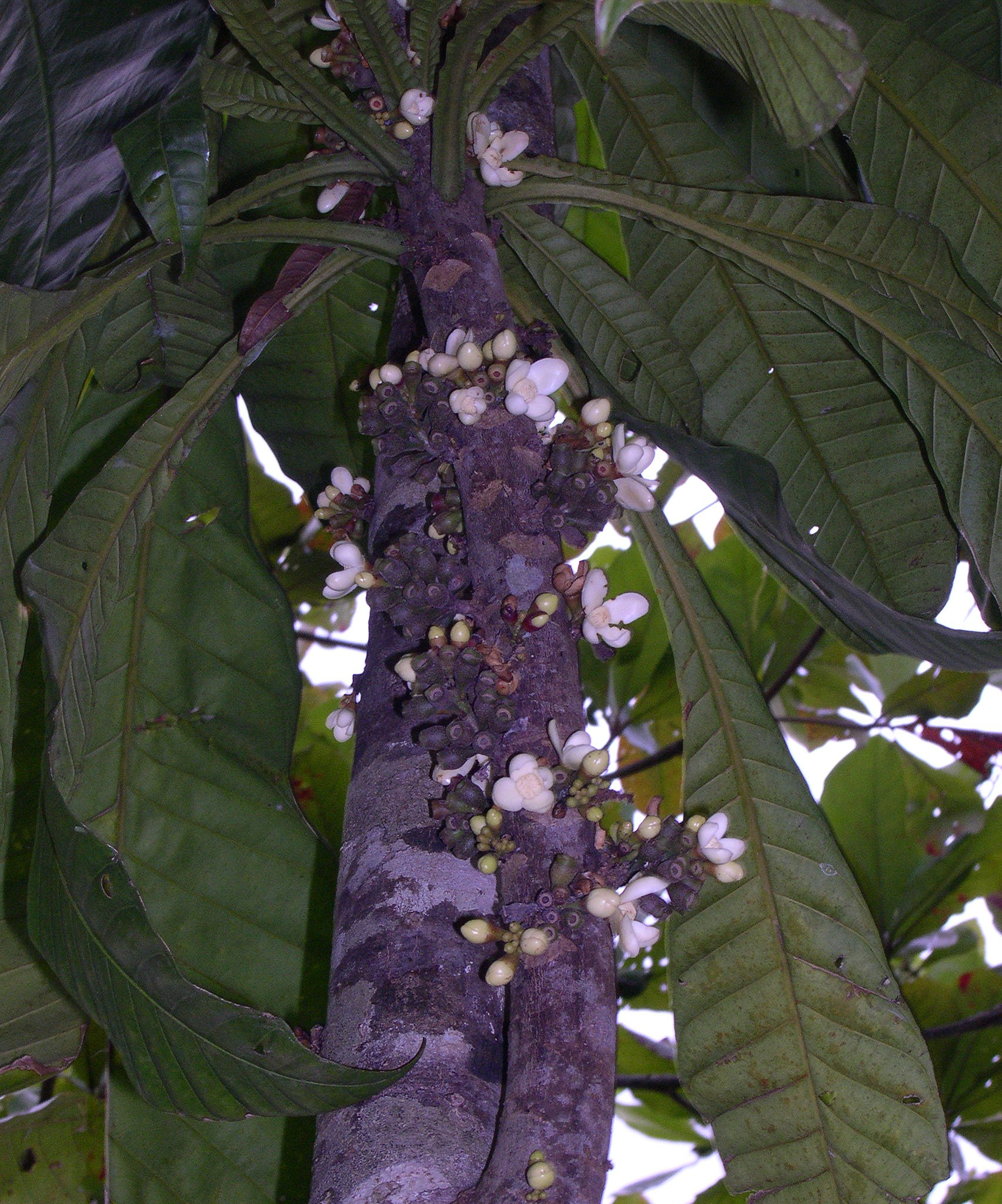

Conservation status
- Least Concern (IUCN 3.1)

Scientific classification
- Kingdom: Plantae
- Clade: Tracheophytes
- Clade: Angiosperms
- Clade: Eudicots
- Clade: Asterids
- Order: Ericales
- Family: Lecythidaceae
- Genus: Grias
- Species: G. cauliflora

Binomial name
- Grias cauliflora L.

Synonyms
- Grias fendleri Seem.; Grias zamorensis Linden; Gustavia integrifolia Standl.; Grias integrifolia (Standl.) R.Knuth; Grias pittieri R.Knuth; Grias gentlei Lundell; Grias dariensis Dwyer; Grias dukei Dwyer; Grias sternii Dwyer

= Grias cauliflora =

Anchovy pear

Species of flowering plant

Grias cauliflora, the anchovy pear, (also called the river pear) is an evergreen fruit tree native to Jamaica, Central America, and Colombia. It is often found near rivers or marshes in large colonies. It belongs to the Lecythidaceae (Brazil nut) family.

The edible nuts grow clumped together in large, round, woody and extremely hard seed pods the size of a large grapefruit. The meat of the seed (the "nut") is very rich in oil and grows from 7 to 9 cm long and 2 to 4 cm in diameter. The tree has fragrant yellow flowers about 5 cm across and grows to a height of about 15 m (50 feet). The anchovy pear tree bears spear-shaped, glossy leaves produced in palm-like tufts that reach an average length of 90 cm. The edible, brown, berrylike fruits for which it is cultivated for pickling are not related to the common pear. The fruit has a taste similar to that of the mango.
