= Napoleonaea egertonii =

Conservation status
- Vulnerable (IUCN 3.1)

Scientific classification
- Kingdom: Plantae
- Clade: Tracheophytes
- Clade: Angiosperms
- Clade: Eudicots
- Clade: Asterids
- Order: Ericales
- Family: Lecythidaceae
- Genus: Napoleonaea
- Species: N. egertonii

Binomial name
- Napoleonaea egertonii Baker f.

Species of flowering plant

Napoleonaea egertonii is a species of woody plant in the family Lecythidaceae. It is found in Cameroon, Gabon, and Nigeria. Its natural habitat is subtropical or tropical moist lowland forests. It is threatened by habitat loss.
