= Neoeromene felix =

Scientific classification
- Kingdom: Animalia
- Phylum: Arthropoda
- Class: Insecta
- Order: Lepidoptera
- Family: Crambidae
- Subfamily: Crambinae
- Tribe: Diptychophorini
- Genus: Neoeromene
- Species: N. felix

Binomial name
- Neoeromene felix (Meyrick, 1931)

Synonyms
- Diptychophora felix Meyrick, 1931; Diptychophora leucanthes Meyrick, 1931

Species of moth

Neoeromene felix is a moth in the family Crambidae. It was described by Edward Meyrick in 1931. It is known from Brazil, Guyana and Peru, but is probably widespread in the tropical forests of the northern and central regions of South America.

The wingspan is 12–13 mm. Adults have been recorded on wing in August and September.
