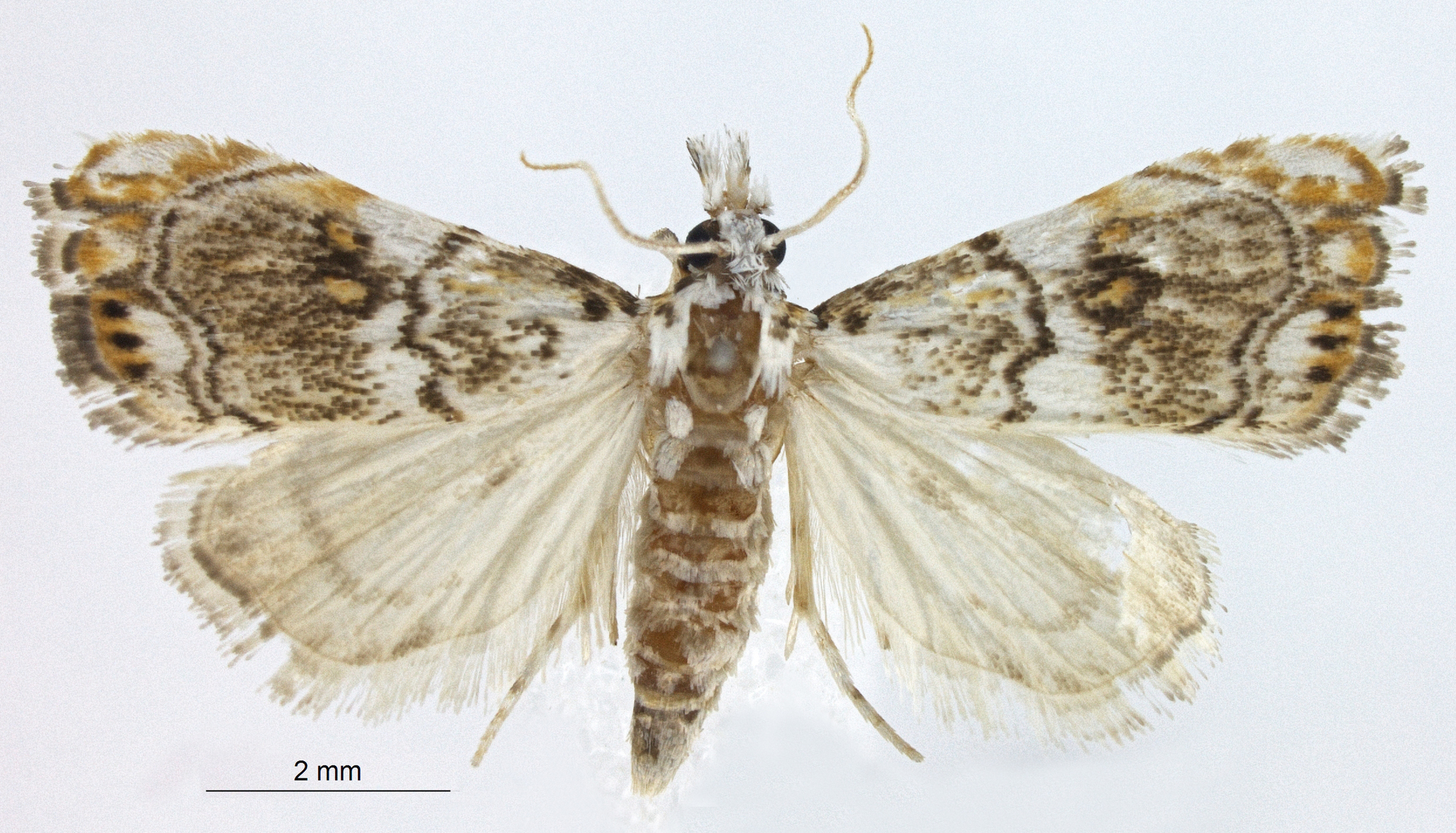

Scientific classification
- Kingdom: Animalia
- Phylum: Arthropoda
- Clade: Pancrustacea
- Class: Insecta
- Order: Lepidoptera
- Family: Crambidae
- Subfamily: Crambinae
- Tribe: Diptychophorini
- Genus: Neoeromene
- Species: N. parvalis

Binomial name
- Neoeromene parvalis (Walker, 1866)

Synonyms
- Isopteryx parvalis Walker, 1866; Diptychophora excitata Meyrick, 1931

= Neoeromene parvalis =

Species of moth

Neoeromene parvalis is a species of moth in the family Crambidae. It was described by Francis Walker in 1866. It is found in the upper Amazon region, where it has been recorded from Brazil and Peru.

Adults have been recorded on wing in August.
