= Neoeromene octavianella =

Scientific classification
- Kingdom: Animalia
- Phylum: Arthropoda
- Clade: Pancrustacea
- Class: Insecta
- Order: Lepidoptera
- Family: Crambidae
- Subfamily: Crambinae
- Tribe: Diptychophorini
- Genus: Neoeromene
- Species: N. octavianella

Binomial name
- Neoeromene octavianella (Zeller, 1877)

Synonyms
- Diptychophora octavianella Zeller, 1877

Species of moth

Neoeromene octavianella is a moth in the family Crambidae. It was described by Philipp Christoph Zeller in 1877. It is found in Panama.
