= Neoeromene straminella =

Scientific classification
- Kingdom: Animalia
- Phylum: Arthropoda
- Clade: Pancrustacea
- Class: Insecta
- Order: Lepidoptera
- Family: Crambidae
- Subfamily: Crambinae
- Tribe: Diptychophorini
- Genus: Neoeromene
- Species: N. straminella

Binomial name
- Neoeromene straminella (Zeller, 1877)

Synonyms
- Diptychophora straminella Zeller, 1877; Diptychophora straminiella Hampson, 1896

Species of moth

Neoeromene straminella is a moth in the family Crambidae. It was described by Philipp Christoph Zeller in 1877. It is found in Brazil.

The wingspan is 14–15 mm. The ground colour of the forewings is pale yellowish orange.
