= Rhaptopetalum =

Scientific classification
- Kingdom: Plantae
- Clade: Tracheophytes
- Clade: Angiosperms
- Clade: Eudicots
- Clade: Asterids
- Order: Ericales
- Family: Lecythidaceae
- Subfamily: Scytopetaloideae
- Genus: Rhaptopetalum; Oliv.

Genus of flowering plants

Rhaptopetalum is a genus of plants in the family Lecythidaceae.

As of November 2018, Kew's Plants of the World Online accepted the following species:

- Rhaptopetalum beguei Mangenot
- Rhaptopetalum belingense Letouzey
- Rhaptopetalum breteleri Letouzey
- Rhaptopetalum cheekii Prance
- Rhaptopetalum coriaceum Oliv.
- Rhaptopetalum depressum Letouzey
- Rhaptopetalum evrardii R.Germ.
- Rhaptopetalum geophylax Cheek & Gosline
- Rhaptopetalum pachyphyllum Engl.
- Rhaptopetalum roseum (Gürke) Engl.
- Rhaptopetalum sessilifolium Engl.
- Rhaptopetalum sindarense Pellegr.
