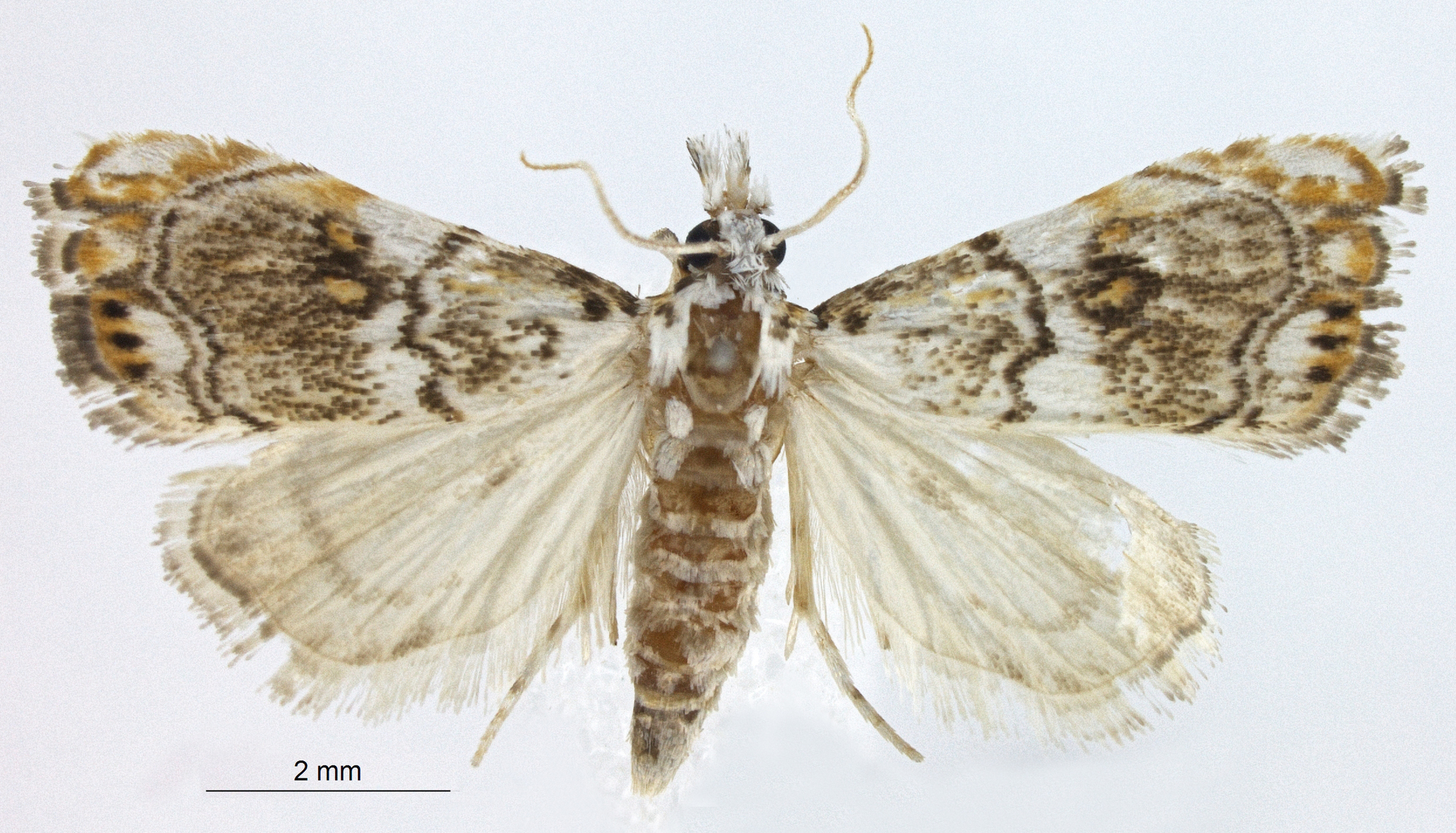
- Neoeromene parvalis

Scientific classification
- Kingdom: Animalia
- Phylum: Arthropoda
- Clade: Pancrustacea
- Class: Insecta
- Order: Lepidoptera
- Family: Crambidae
- Tribe: Diptychophorini
- Genus: Neoeromene; Gaskin, 1986

= Neoeromene =

Genus of moths

Neoeromene is a genus of moths in the family Crambidae.

== Species ==
- Neoeromene felix (Meyrick, 1931)
- Neoeromene herstanella (Schaus, 1922)
- Neoeromene lutea Gaskin, 1989
- Neoeromene octavianella (Zeller, 1877)
- Neoeromene parvalis (Walker, 1866)
- Neoeromene parvipuncta Gaskin, 1986
- Neoeromene straminella (Zeller, 1877)
