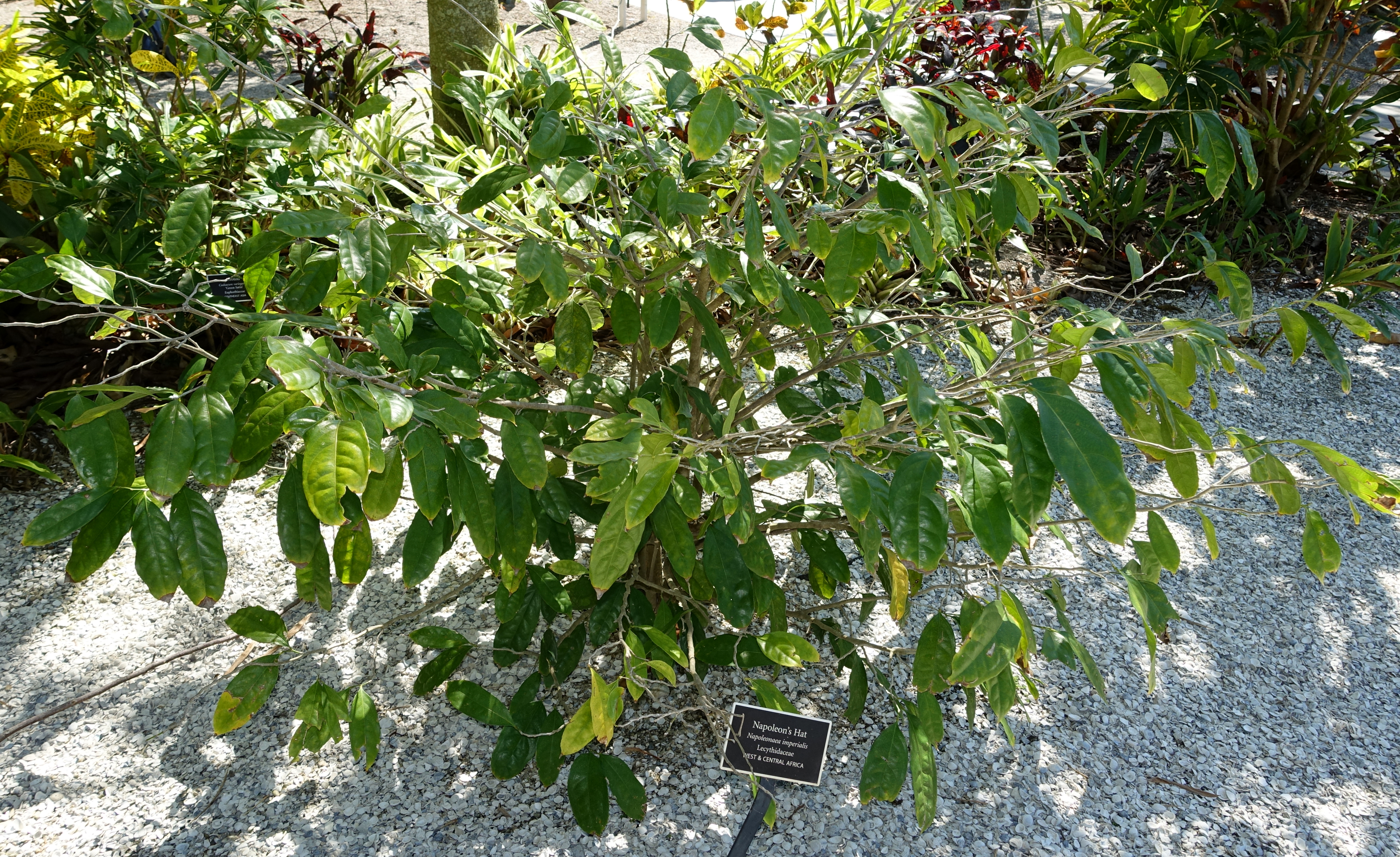
- N. imperialis in the Naples Botanical Garden, Florida

Scientific classification
- Kingdom: Plantae
- Clade: Tracheophytes
- Clade: Angiosperms
- Clade: Eudicots
- Clade: Asterids
- Order: Ericales
- Family: Lecythidaceae
- Genus: Napoleonaea
- Species: N. imperialis

Binomial name
- Napoleonaea imperialis P.Beauv.

Synonyms
- Belvisia caerulea Desv.; Napoleona imperialis P.Beauv. - spelling variant; Napoleona whitfieldii Decne.; Napoleonaea alexanderi Baker f.; Napoleonaea cuspidata Miers; Napoleonaea mannii Miers; Napoleonaea miersii Hook.f.

= Napoleonaea imperialis =

Species of grass

Napoleonaea imperialis is a small, evergreen tropical West African tree in the family Lecythidaceae, native to Africa.

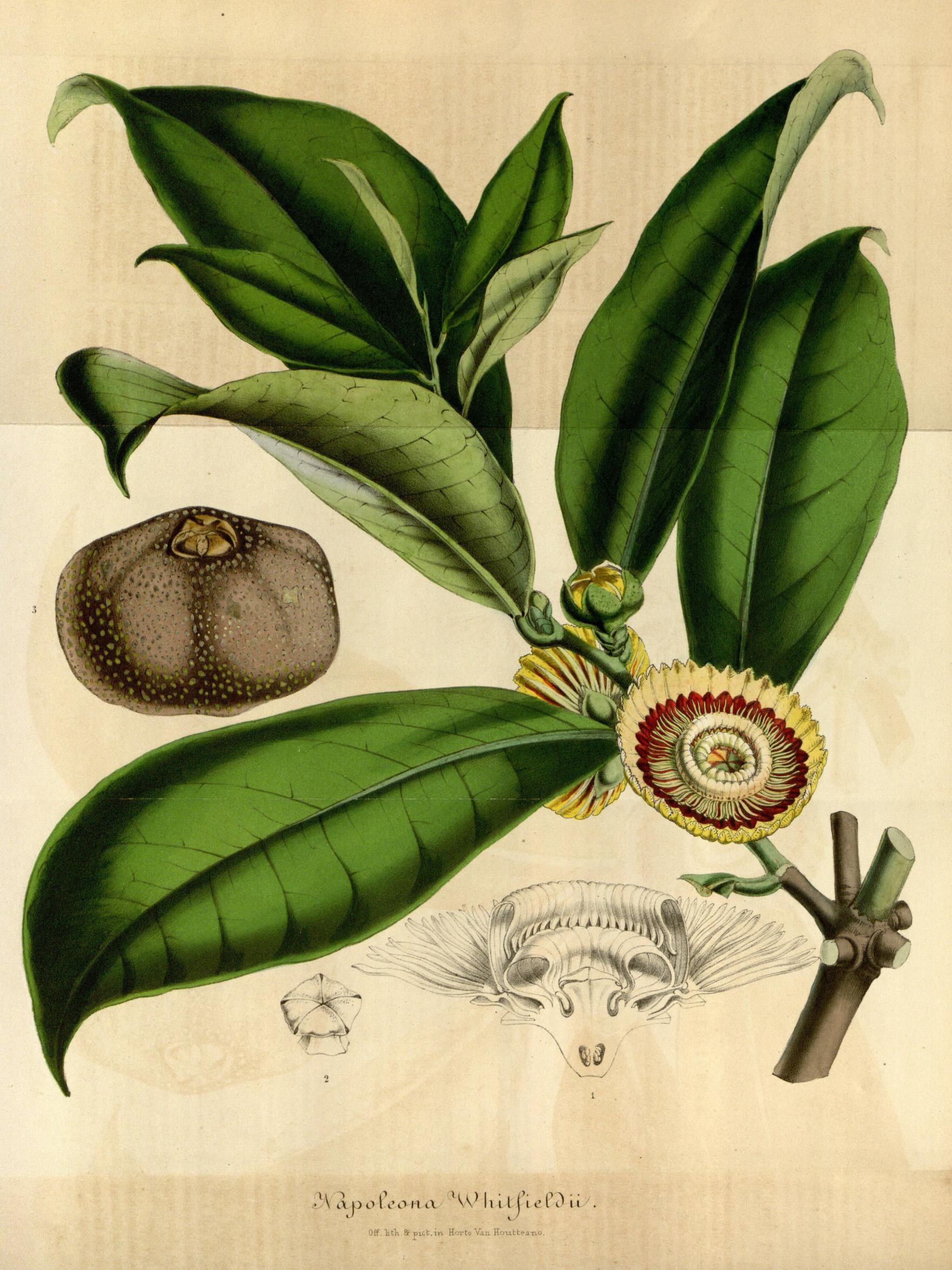
1848 illustration by Walter Hood Fitch by in Flore des serres et des jardins de l'Europe

It grows to some 6m in height, with a dense, low-branching crown, and occurs from Benin, Nigeria, Gabon and the Democratic Republic of the Congo southwards to Angola. The showy flowers have two inner rows of petals and vary in colour, usually creamy yellow along the circumference, with the center ranging from red to apricot to purple - they develop either on young branches or grow directly from the old wood of the trunk. The fruit is a berry, dark orange or reddish-brown containing a kidney-shaped seed. This species is popularly cultivated as an ornamental tree.

The species was described in 1804, the same year its namesake (Napoleone di Buonaparte) crowned himself Emperor of the French.

== Ethnic medicine ==
Extracts from the leaves and toxic seeds display bactericidal activity and contain various glycosides, tannins, proteins and saponins, while flavonoids, resins and steroids are absent.

Escherichia coli, Bacillus subtilis and Pseudomonas aeruginosa are inhibited, justifying the use of the species in tribal pharmacology. The bark and fruit pulp are chewed to alleviate pulmonary problems. Analysis of the seeds revealed the presence of napoleogenol, napoleogenin (Kapundu et al., 1980), napoleonaside, and a molluscicidal saponin.
