= Napoleonaea reptans =

Conservation status
- Critically Endangered (IUCN 2.3)

Scientific classification
- Kingdom: Plantae
- Clade: Tracheophytes
- Clade: Angiosperms
- Clade: Eudicots
- Clade: Asterids
- Order: Ericales
- Family: Lecythidaceae
- Genus: Napoleonaea
- Species: N. reptans

Binomial name
- Napoleonaea reptans Baker f. f. ex Hutch. & Dalziel

Species of flowering plant

Napoleonaea reptans is a species of woody plant in the family Lecythidaceae. It is found only in Nigeria. It is threatened by habitat loss.
