= Neoeromene parvipuncta =

Scientific classification
- Kingdom: Animalia
- Phylum: Arthropoda
- Clade: Pancrustacea
- Class: Insecta
- Order: Lepidoptera
- Family: Crambidae
- Subfamily: Crambinae
- Tribe: Diptychophorini
- Genus: Neoeromene
- Species: N. parvipuncta

Binomial name
- Neoeromene parvipuncta Gaskin, 1986

Species of moth

Neoeromene parvipuncta is a moth in the family Crambidae. It was described by David E. Gaskin in 1986. It is found in Paraná, Brazil.
