= Neoeromene herstanella =

Scientific classification
- Domain: Eukaryota
- Kingdom: Animalia
- Phylum: Arthropoda
- Class: Insecta
- Order: Lepidoptera
- Family: Crambidae
- Subfamily: Crambinae
- Tribe: Diptychophorini
- Genus: Neoeromene
- Species: N. herstanella

Binomial name
- Neoeromene herstanella (Schaus, 1922)

Synonyms
- Diptychophora herstanella Schaus, 1922

Species of moth

Neoeromene herstanella is a moth in the family Crambidae. It was described by William Schaus in 1922. It is found in Panama and Costa Rica.

The wingspan is about 9 mm. Adults have been recorded on wing in February.
