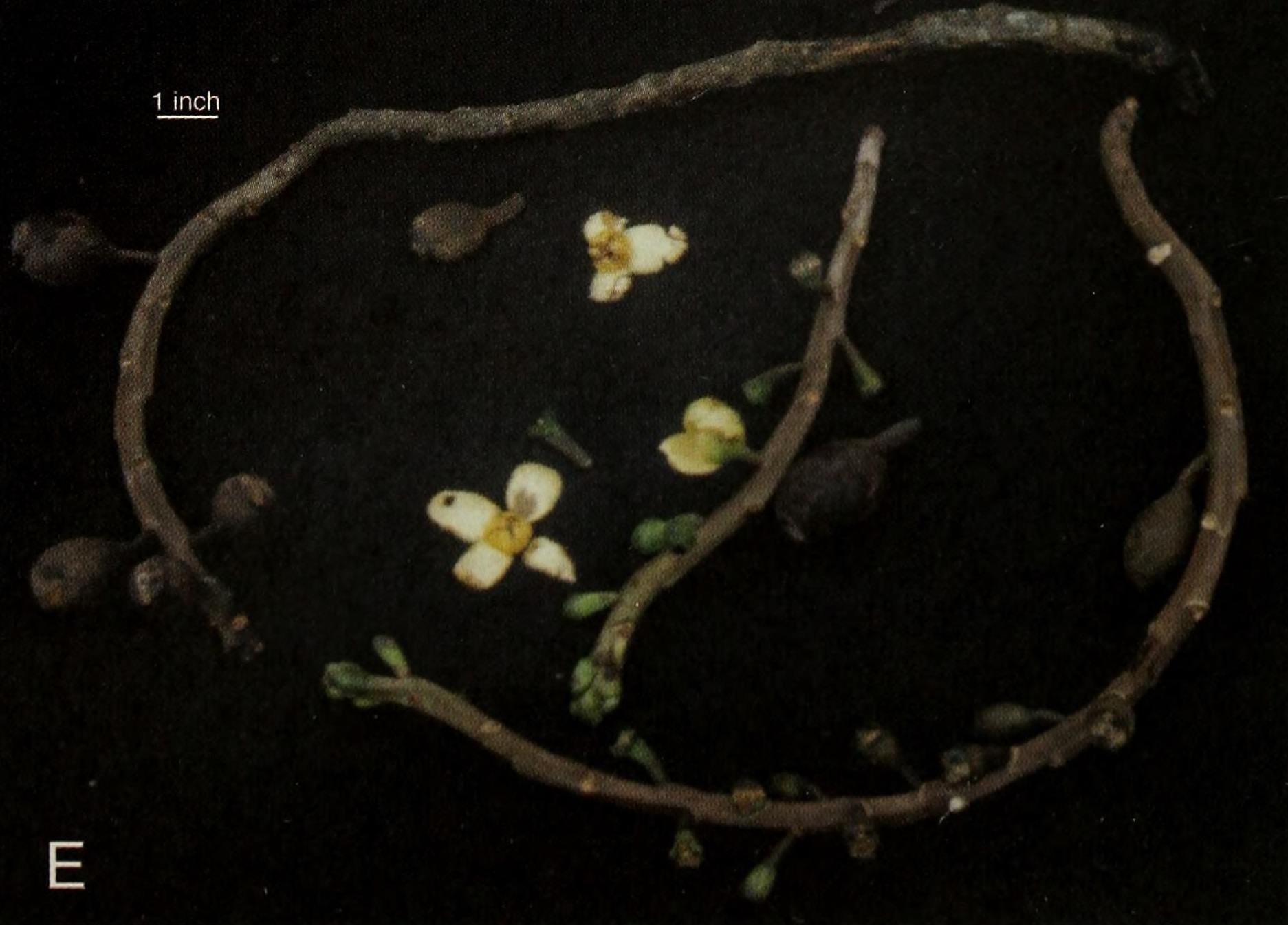

Conservation status
- Endangered (IUCN 3.1)

Scientific classification
- Kingdom: Plantae
- Clade: Tracheophytes
- Clade: Angiosperms
- Clade: Eudicots
- Clade: Asterids
- Order: Ericales
- Family: Lecythidaceae
- Genus: Grias
- Species: G. longirachis

Binomial name
- Grias longirachis Mori & Clark

= Grias longirachis =

Species of flowering plant

Grias longirachis is a species of woody plant in the family Lecythidaceae. It is found only in Ecuador. Its natural habitats are subtropical or tropical moist lowland forests and subtropical or tropical moist montane forests.
