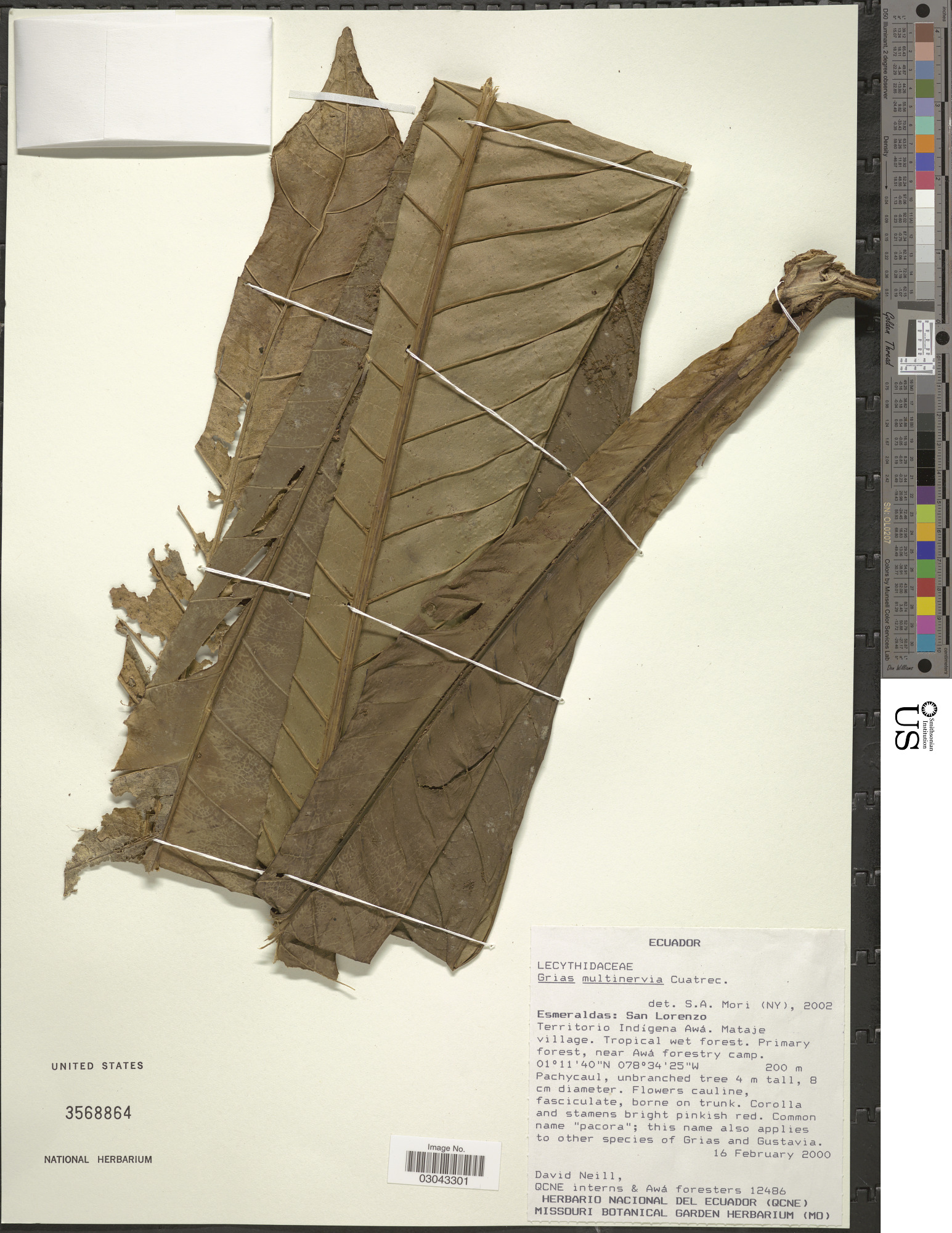

Conservation status
- Vulnerable (IUCN 2.3)

Scientific classification
- Kingdom: Plantae
- Clade: Tracheophytes
- Clade: Angiosperms
- Clade: Eudicots
- Clade: Asterids
- Order: Ericales
- Family: Lecythidaceae
- Genus: Grias
- Species: G. multinervia

Binomial name
- Grias multinervia Cuatrecasas

= Grias multinervia =

Species of flowering plant

Grias multinervia is a species of rainforest tree in the family Lecythidaceae, growing to 20 m (66 ft) tall, described by José Cuatrecasas in 1951. It is found in Colombia and Ecuador. It has very large leaves, 110–145 cm (43–57 in) long by 24–35 cm (9.4–13.8 in) wide. The seeds are also very large, 77 mm (3.0 in) long by 30 mm (1.2 in) wide, contained within a fruit 100 mm (3.9 in) long and 50 mm (2.0 in) wide, with eight longitudinal ribs.
