= Rhaptopetalum beguei =

Conservation status
- Least Concern (IUCN 2.3)

Scientific classification
- Kingdom: Plantae
- Clade: Tracheophytes
- Clade: Angiosperms
- Clade: Eudicots
- Clade: Asterids
- Order: Ericales
- Family: Lecythidaceae
- Genus: Rhaptopetalum
- Species: R. beguei

Binomial name
- Rhaptopetalum beguei Mangenot

Species of flowering plant

Rhaptopetalum beguei is a species of plant in the family Lecythidaceae. It is found in Cameroon, Côte d'Ivoire, Equatorial Guinea, Gabon, Ghana, and Nigeria.
