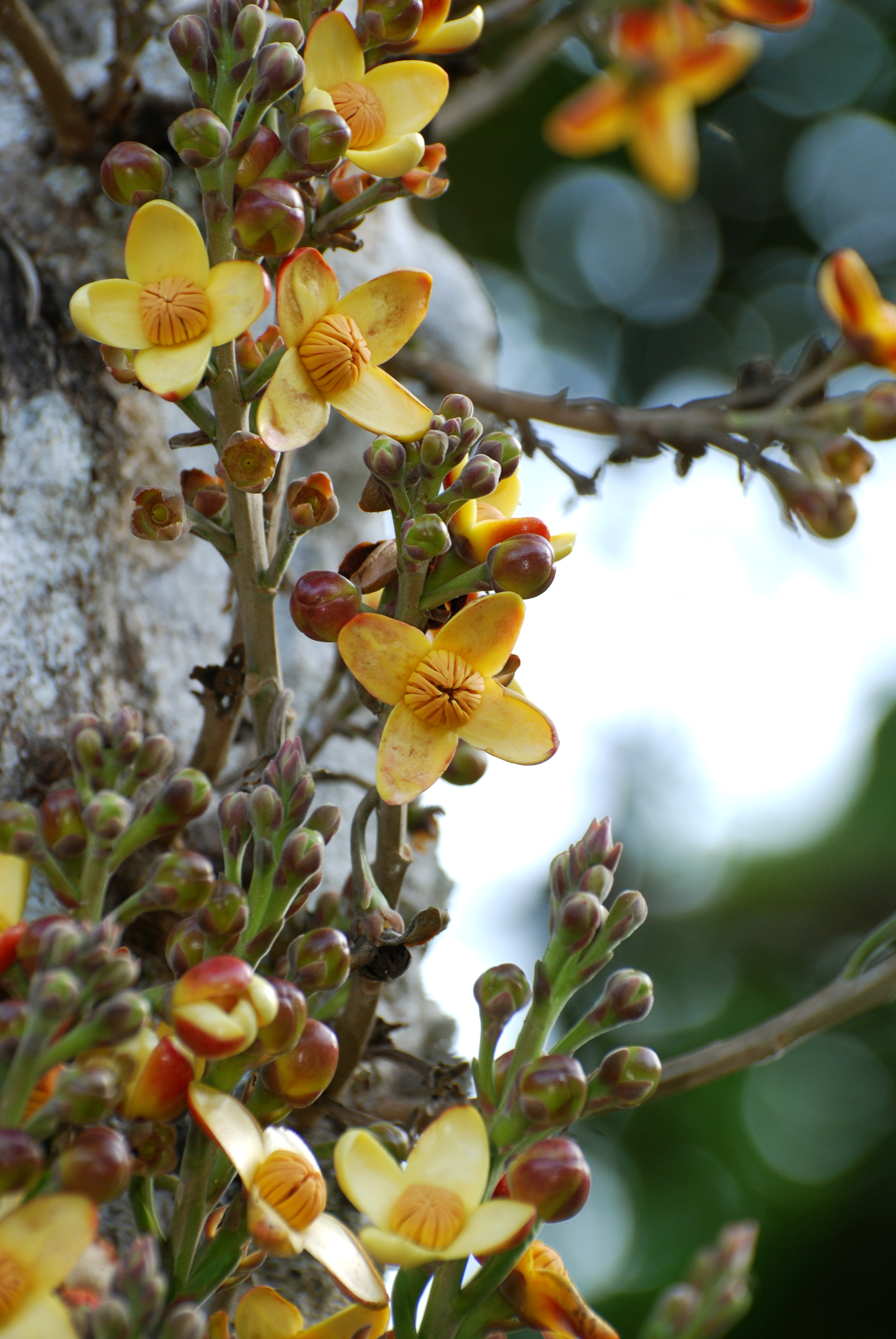
- Grias neuberthii

Scientific classification
- Kingdom: Plantae
- Clade: Tracheophytes
- Clade: Angiosperms
- Clade: Eudicots
- Clade: Asterids
- Order: Ericales
- Family: Lecythidaceae
- Subfamily: Lecythidoideae
- Genus: Grias; L.

Type species
- Grias cauliflora L.

= Grias =

Genus of trees

Grias is a genus of flowering plants in the family Lecythidaceae, described by Linnaeus in 1759. It is native to northwestern South America, Central America, and Jamaica.

They are small to medium-sized trees, growing to 5–15 m (16–49 ft) tall. The leaves are evergreen, alternate, simple, broad lanceolate, very large, up to 1 m (3 ft 3 in) long, with an entire or waved margin. The flowers are creamy white to yellow, with four petals; they are cauliflorous, produced in clusters on the trunk and stouter branches. The fruit is 6–15 cm (2.4–5.9 in) long, with a fleshy coat; it is edible in several species.

Grias neuberthii extracts show in vitro activity against human cancer cells.

Accepted species

1. Grias angustipetala - Ecuador
2. Grias cauliflora - Anchovy pear - Central America, Jamaica, Colombia
3. Grias colombiana - Colombia
4. Grias ecuadorica - Ecuador
5. Grias haughtii - Colombia
6. Grias longirachis - Ecuador
7. Grias multinervia - Ecuador, Colombia, Venezuela
8. Grias neuberthii - Sachamangua - Ecuador, Colombia, Peru
9. Grias peruviana - Sachamangua - Ecuador, Peru
10. Grias purpuripetala - Colombia
11. Grias subbullata - Ecuador
12. Grias theobromicarpa - Pichincha
