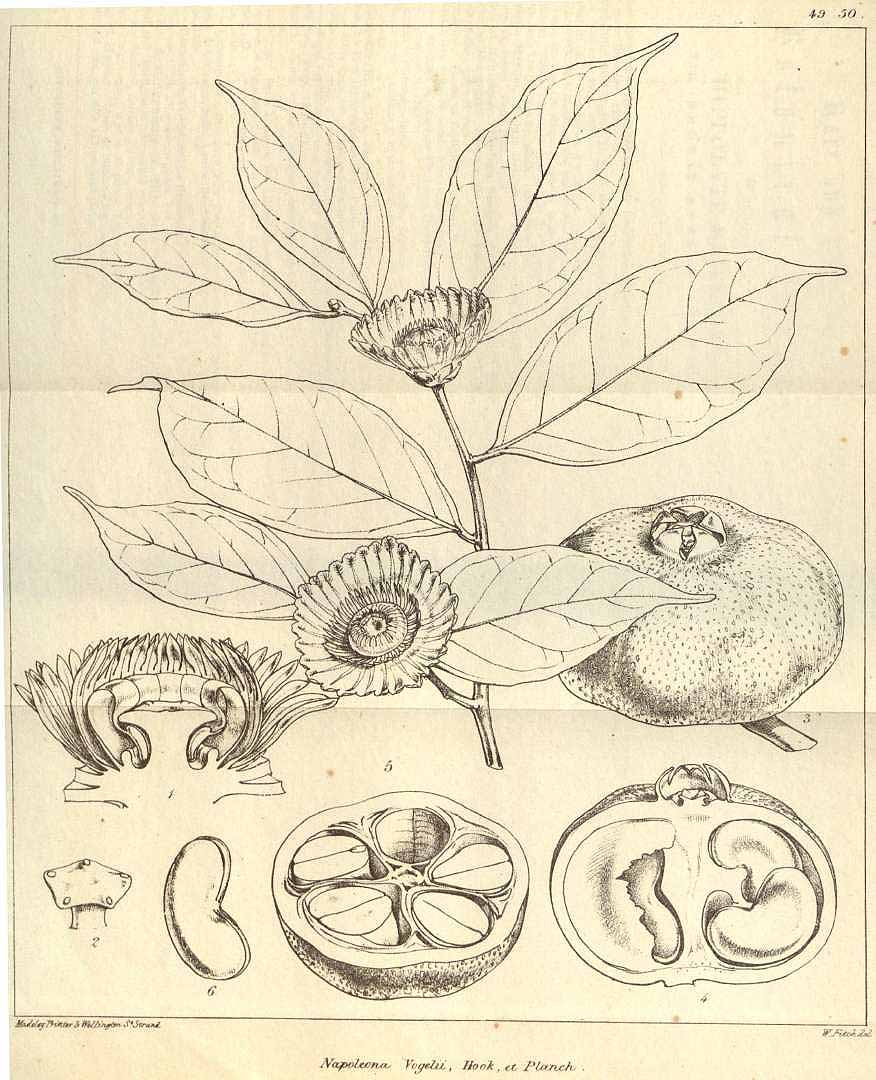

Scientific classification
- Kingdom: Plantae
- Clade: Tracheophytes
- Clade: Angiosperms
- Clade: Eudicots
- Clade: Asterids
- Order: Ericales
- Family: Lecythidaceae
- Genus: Napoleonaea
- Species: N. vogelii

Binomial name
- Napoleonaea vogelii Hook. & Planch.

= Napoleonaea vogelii =

Species of shrub

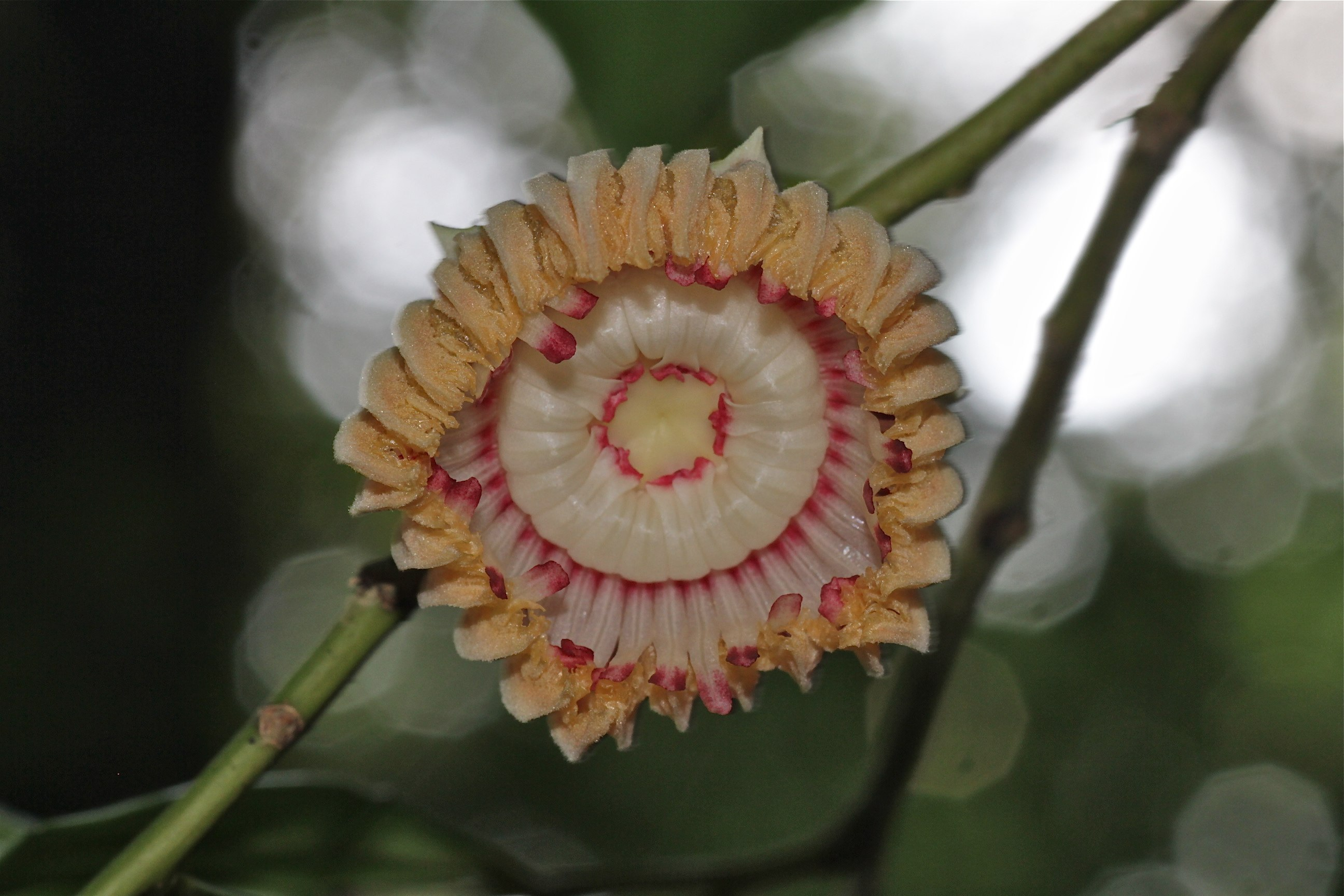
Flower of Napoleonaea vogelii

Napoleonaea vogelii is an evergreen shrub or a low-branching tree with a dense crown growing up to 15 metres tall. It grows in Sierra Leone, Liberia, and Cote D'Ivoire. The bark is used locally to flavour rice and to chew with cola nuts as a stimulant.
