= Neoeromene lutea =

Scientific classification
- Kingdom: Animalia
- Phylum: Arthropoda
- Clade: Pancrustacea
- Class: Insecta
- Order: Lepidoptera
- Family: Crambidae
- Subfamily: Crambinae
- Tribe: Diptychophorini
- Genus: Neoeromene
- Species: N. lutea

Binomial name
- Neoeromene lutea Gaskin, 1989

Species of moth

Neoeromene lutea is a moth in the family Crambidae. It was described by David E. Gaskin in 1989. It is found in Santa Catarina, Brazil.
