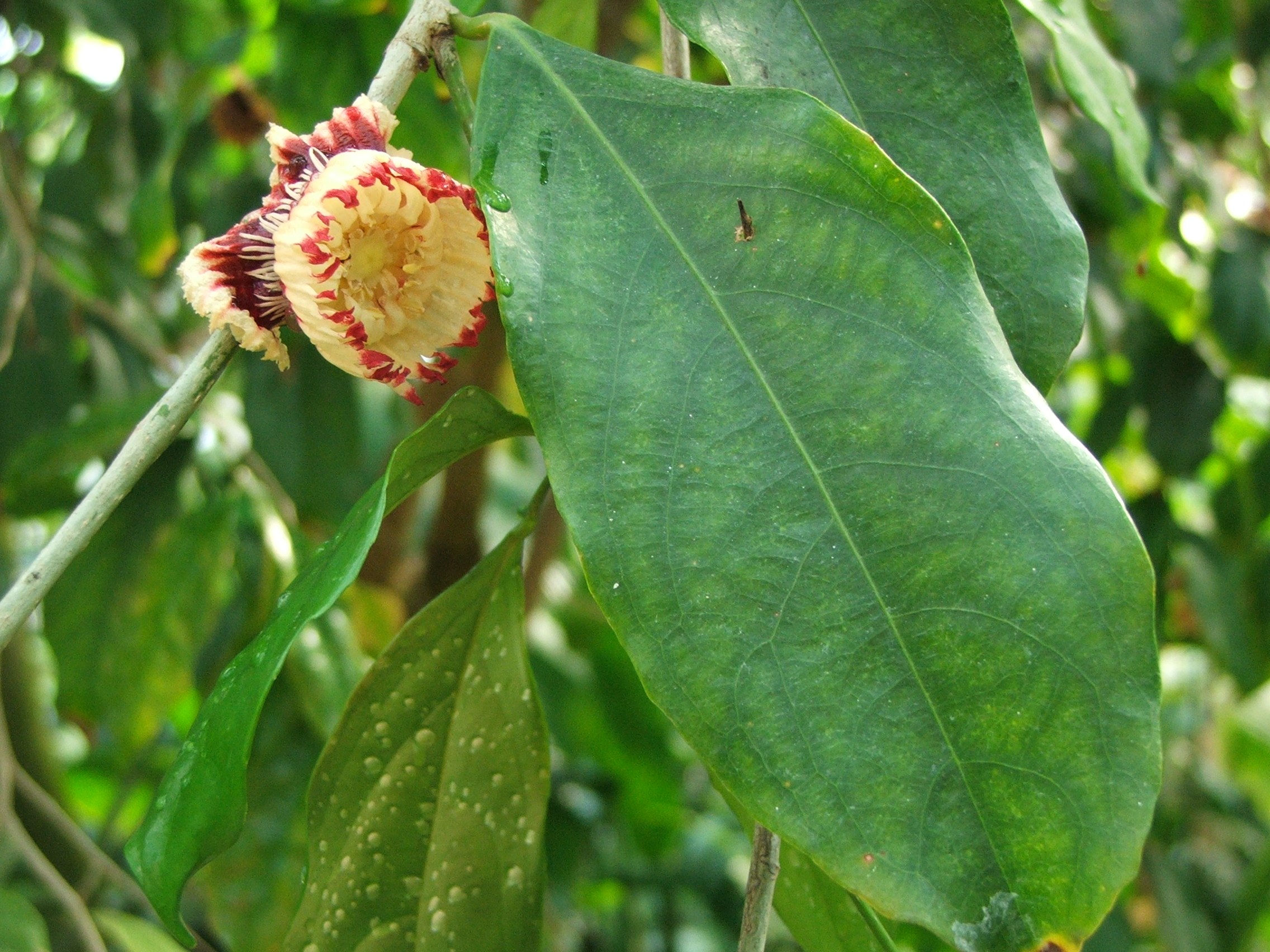
- Napoleonaea imperialis

Scientific classification
- Kingdom: Plantae
- Clade: Tracheophytes
- Clade: Angiosperms
- Clade: Eudicots
- Clade: Asterids
- Order: Ericales
- Family: Lecythidaceae
- Subfamily: Napoleonaeoideae
- Genus: Napoleonaea; P.Beauv.

Type species
- Napoleonaea imperialis P.Beauv.

Synonyms
- Belvisia Desv. 1814, illegitimate homonym, not Mirb. 1802 (Polypodiaceae); Napoleona P.Beauv., spelling variant

= Napoleonaea =

Genus of grasses

Napoleonaea is a genus of woody plant in the family Lecythidaceae first described as a genus in 1804, the same year its namesake (Napoleon Bonaparte) crowned himself Emperor of the French. The genus is native to Africa.

Accepted species

1. Napoleonaea egertonii Baker f. - Nigeria, Gabon
2. Napoleonaea gabonensis Liben - Cameroon, Gabon
3. Napoleonaea gossweileri Baker f. - Republic of the Congo, Angola, Zambia
4. Napoleonaea heudelotii A.Juss. - Guinea, Sierra Leone, Liberia, Burkina Faso
5. Napoleonaea imperialis P.Beauv. - from Benin to Angola
6. Napoleonaea lutea Baker f. ex Hutch. & Dalziel - Nigeria
7. Napoleonaea reptans Baker f. ex Hutch. & Dalziel - Nigeria
8. Napoleonaea septentrionalis Liben - Central African Republic, Republic of the Congo, Democratic Republic of the Congo, Gabon
9. Napoleonaea talbotii Baker f. - Nigeria, Gabon, Cameroon, Republic of the Congo
10. Napoleonaea vogelii Hook. & Planch. - from Guinea to Angola
