= Gibberula colombiana =

Scientific classification
- Kingdom: Animalia
- Phylum: Mollusca
- Class: Gastropoda
- Subclass: Caenogastropoda
- Order: Neogastropoda
- Family: Cystiscidae
- Subfamily: Cystiscinae
- Genus: Gibberula
- Species: G. colombiana

Binomial name
- Gibberula colombiana Boyer, 2003

Species of gastropod

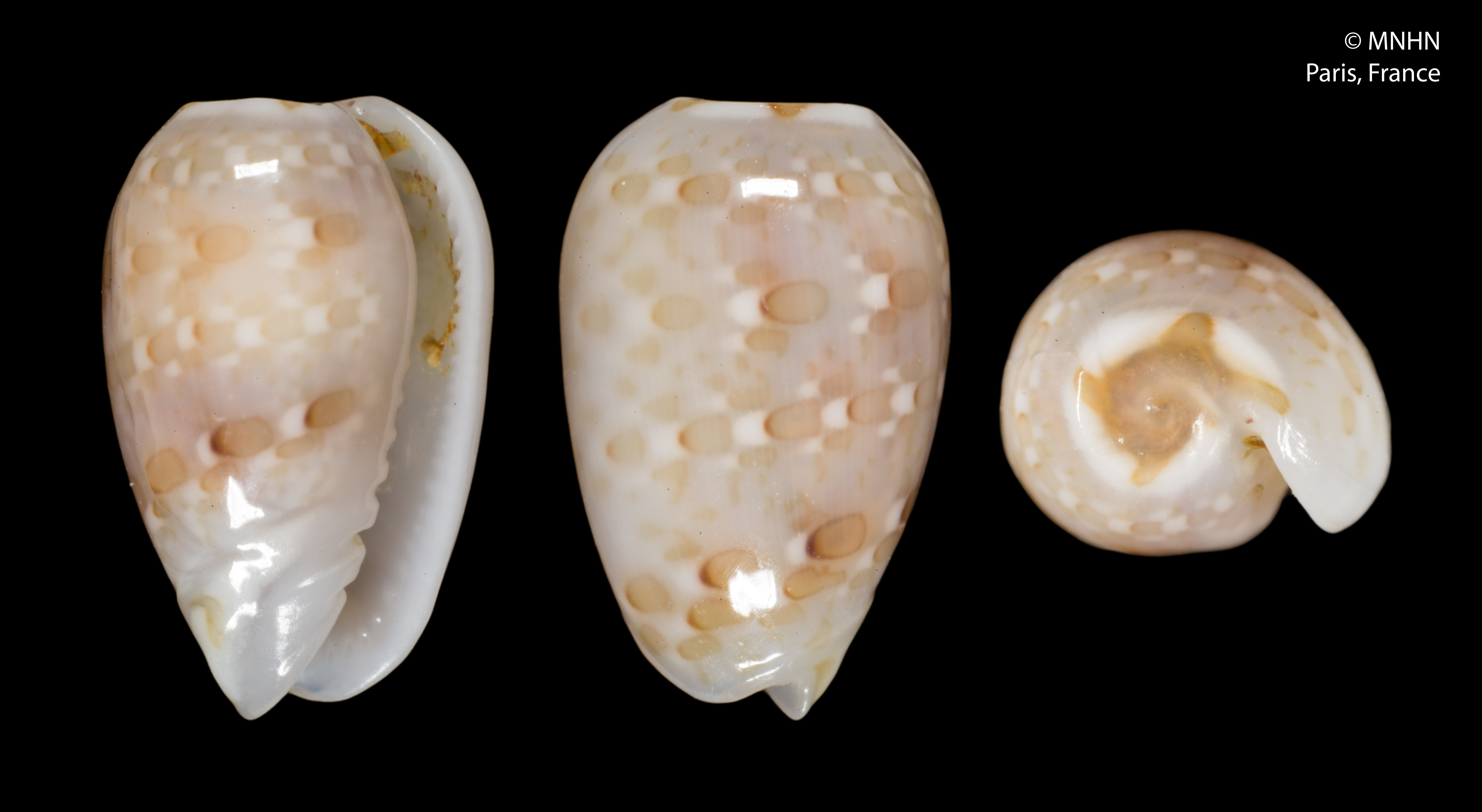

Gibberula colombiana is a species of very small sea snail, a marine gastropod mollusk or micromollusk in the family Cystiscidae.

== Distribution ==
This marine species occurs in the Lesser Antilles off Martinique.
