= Grias colombiana =

Conservation status
- Vulnerable (IUCN 2.3)

Scientific classification
- Kingdom: Plantae
- Clade: Tracheophytes
- Clade: Angiosperms
- Clade: Eudicots
- Clade: Asterids
- Order: Ericales
- Family: Lecythidaceae
- Genus: Grias
- Species: G. colombiana

Binomial name
- Grias colombiana Cuatrecasas

Species of flowering plant

Grias colombiana is a species of woody plant in the family Lecythidaceae. It is found only in Colombia.
