= Stenoderini =

Scientific classification
- Kingdom: Animalia
- Phylum: Arthropoda
- Clade: Pancrustacea
- Class: Insecta
- Order: Coleoptera
- Suborder: Polyphaga
- Infraorder: Cucujiformia
- Family: Cerambycidae
- Subfamily: Cerambycinae
- Tribe: Stenoderini; Aurivillius, 1912

Tribe of beetles

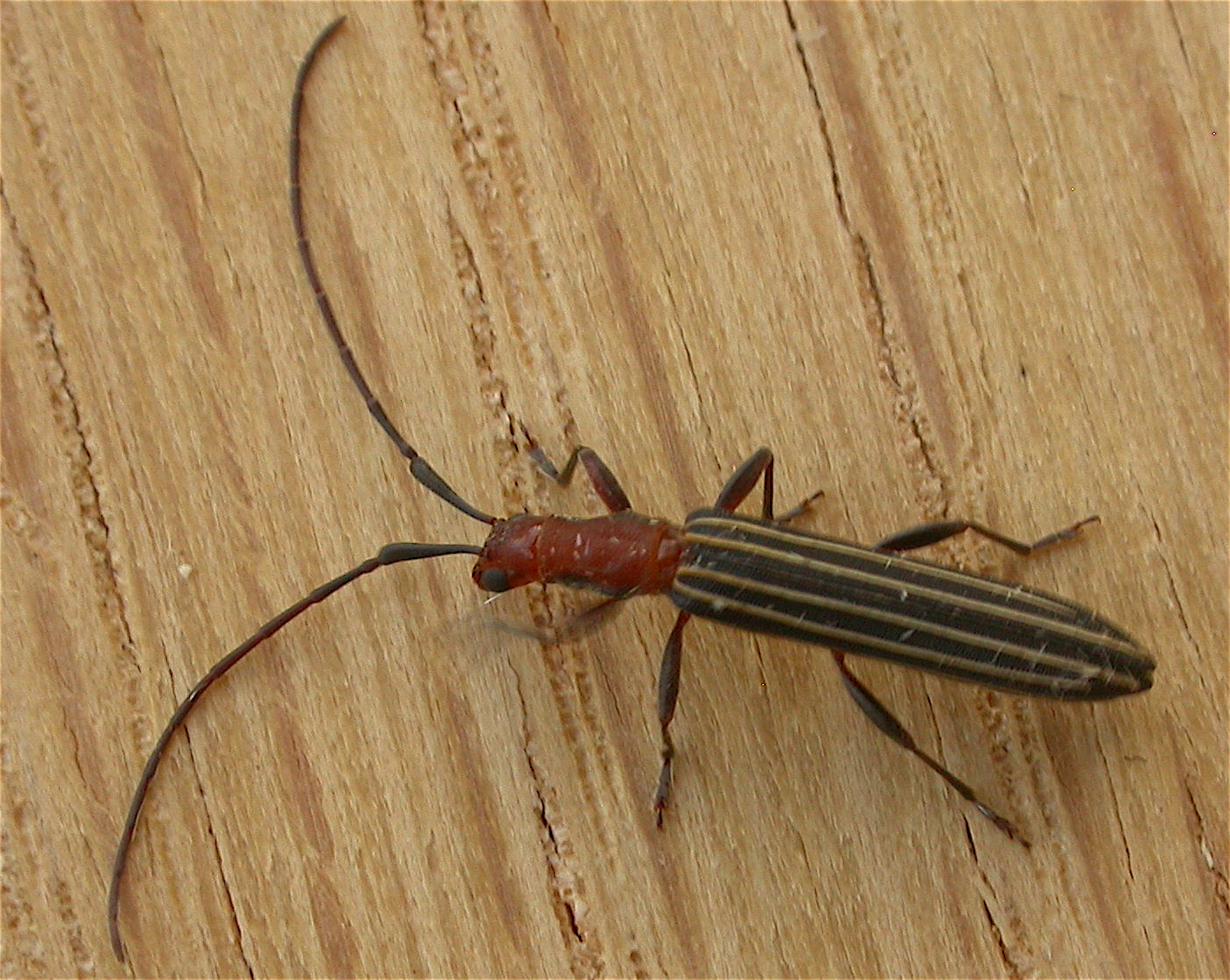
Syllitus rectus

Stenoderini is a tribe of beetles in the subfamily Cerambycinae, containing the following genera and species:

- Cacodrotus Broun, 1893
  - Cacodrotus bifasciatus Broun, 1893
- Calliprason White, 1843
  - Calliprason costifer (Broun, 1886)
  - Calliprason elegans (Sharp, 1877)
  - Calliprason marginatum White, 1846
  - Calliprason pallidus Pascoe, 1875
  - Calliprason sinclairi White, 1843
- Demomisis Pascoe, 1867
  - Demomisis filum Pascoe, 1867
- Drototelus Broun, 1903
  - Drototelus elegans (Brookes, 1927)
  - Drototelus politus Broun, 1903
  - Drototelus rarus Wang & Lu, 2004
- Leptachrous Bates, 1874
  - Leptachrous strigipennis (Westwood, 1845)
- Ophryops White, 1846
  - Ophryops aegrotus Bates, 1876
  - Ophryops dispar Sharp, 1886
  - Ophryops fuscicollis Broun, 1913
  - Ophryops medius Broun, 1913
  - Ophryops pallidus White, 1846
  - Ophryops pseudofuscicollis Lu & Wang, 2004
- Simocrysa Pascoe, 1871
  - Simocrysa discolor Pascoe, 1871
  - Simocrysa tricolor McKeown, 1942
- Stenoderus Dejean, 1821
  - Stenoderus concolor MacLeay, 1826
  - Stenoderus opacicollis Aurivillius, 1917
  - Stenoderus ostricilla Newman, 1850
  - Stenoderus quietus Newman, 1857
  - Stenoderus suturalis (Olivier, 1795)
- Syllitosimilis McKeown, 1938
  - Syllitosimilis aberrans McKeown, 1938
- Syllitus Pascoe, 1859
  - Syllitus acanthias McKeown, 1937
  - Syllitus adonarensis Jordan, 1894
  - Syllitus albipennis Pascoe, 1869
  - Syllitus araucariae McKeown, 1938
  - Syllitus argillaceus McKeown, 1937
  - Syllitus bellulus McKeown, 1942
  - Syllitus beltrani Cerda, 1968
  - Syllitus bicolor (Schwarzer, 1924)
  - Syllitus bipunctatus Waterhouse, 1877
  - Syllitus brimblecombei McKeown, 1938
  - Syllitus buloloensis Gressitt, 1959
  - Syllitus cassiniae McKeown, 1938
  - Syllitus centrocrus McKeown, 1938
  - Syllitus chilensis Cerda, 1953
  - Syllitus cylindricus Germain, 1899
  - Syllitus deustus (Newman, 1841)
  - Syllitus divergens McKeown, 1937
  - Syllitus dubius McKeown, 1938
  - Syllitus elguetai Cerda, 1991
  - Syllitus froggatti McKeown, 1937
  - Syllitus fulvipennis Gahan, 1893
  - Syllitus grammicus (Pascoe, 1840)
  - Syllitus heros Blackburn, 1900
  - Syllitus insularis Gressitt, 1959
  - Syllitus leoensis Gilmour, 1961
  - Syllitus microps Blackburn, 1900
  - Syllitus minor Gressitt, 1959
  - Syllitus minutus McKeown, 1937
  - Syllitus niger Gressitt, 1959
  - Syllitus papuanus Gestro, 1875
  - Syllitus parryi Pascoe, 1862
  - Syllitus pseudocupes (Fairmaire & Germain, 1864)
  - Syllitus rectus (Newman, 1841)
  - Syllitus schajovskoii Bosq, 1953
  - Syllitus sexlineatus Gressitt, 1951
  - Syllitus sinuaticosta McKeown, 1938
  - Syllitus sinuatus McKeown, 1937
  - Syllitus spinosus Gahan, 1915
  - Syllitus stellamontis Gressitt, 1959
  - Syllitus tabidus Pascoe, 1871
  - Syllitus terminatus Pascoe, 1871
  - Syllitus timorensis Gilmour, 1961
  - Syllitus tuberculatus McKeown, 1938
  - Syllitus undulatus Heller, 1914
  - Syllitus uniformis Blackburn, 1893
  - Syllitus unistriatus McKeown, 1942
- Votum Broun, 1880
  - Votum mundum Broun, 1880
