= Rectus =

"Rectus" is the Latin word meaning "straight" and is used in English to refer to multiple topics in the sciences, including:

In molecular chemistry the R in the R & S isomerism stands for "rectus"

In grammar "casus rectus" is a formal term for nominative case

In mathematics sine is also known as "sinus rectus"

In the classification of the animal kingdom it is the systematic taxonomic name of several species, e.g. campylobacter rectus & syllitus rectus

In anatomy it is used to refer to a rectus muscle, primarily e.g. the "rectus abdominis muscle"; in anatomy it can also refer to:

- Inferior rectus muscle
- Superior rectus muscle
- Lateral rectus muscle
- Medial rectus muscle
- Musculus rectus thoracis
- Rectus capitis lateralis muscle
- Rectus femoris muscle
