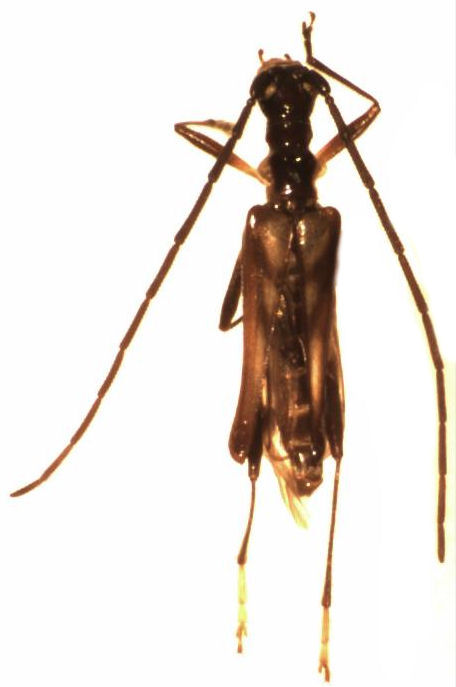

Scientific classification
- Kingdom: Animalia
- Phylum: Arthropoda
- Class: Insecta
- Order: Coleoptera
- Suborder: Polyphaga
- Infraorder: Cucujiformia
- Family: Cerambycidae
- Subfamily: Cerambycinae
- Tribe: Stenoderini
- Genus: Drototelus; Broun, 1903

Species
- Drototelus politus; Drototelus elegans; Drototelus rarus

= Drototelus =

Genus of beetle endemic to New Zealand

Drototelus is a genus of longhorn beetle that is endemic to New Zealand. It was first named in 1903 by T. Broun who proposed it for the species Drototelus politus. There are currently three species within the genus: D. politus, D. elegans, and D. rarus. Only 18 specimens currently exist in collections, with minimal observations in the wild.

== Description ==
Like other longhorn beetles their most notable feature are their long antennae, these antennae are as long as the body and are inserted into small protrusions near the eyes. The most explicitly described of the Drototelus genus is for D. politus. It has a broad head with distinctly facetted large eyes with an elongate thorax. D. elegans looks very similar to D. politus but is dull in appearance rather than shiny and has pale bands on its antennae, however both species have a pale hind tarsi which is not shared by D. rarus. D. elegans specifically is a Batesian mimic of the ichneumonid wasp Xanthocryptus novozealandicus.

== Habitat ==
The habitat for Drototelus was originally thought to be the lower North Island, primarily concentrated around Wellington, however, in 2008 D. politus, and later D. elegans were found in the Waitākere Ranges near Auckland, much further north than their original range was thought to be. All species within Drototelus live within native bush and are specifically associated with both ous and non-coniferous plants such as Podocarpus and Cassinia. D. politus adults are diurnal and flower visitors, while larvae feed in dead plants. Due to this, it is suspected that adult D. politus is involved in the pollination of some native flora.
