= Syllitus sutteri =

Scientific classification
- Kingdom: Animalia
- Phylum: Arthropoda
- Clade: Pancrustacea
- Class: Insecta
- Order: Coleoptera
- Suborder: Polyphaga
- Infraorder: Cucujiformia
- Family: Cerambycidae
- Genus: Syllitus
- Species: S. sutteri

Binomial name
- Syllitus sutteri Franz, 1972

Species of beetle

Syllitus sutteri is a species of beetle in the family Cerambycidae. It was described by Elli Franz in 1972.
