= Hedycarya loxocarya =

Conservation status
- Least Concern (IUCN 3.1)

Scientific classification
- Kingdom: Plantae
- Clade: Embryophytes
- Clade: Tracheophytes
- Clade: Spermatophytes
- Clade: Angiosperms
- Clade: Magnoliids
- Order: Laurales
- Family: Monimiaceae
- Genus: Hedycarya
- Species: H. loxocarya

Binomial name
- Hedycarya loxocarya (Benth.) W.D.Francis

Synonyms
- Mollinedia loxocarya Benth.; Wilkiea loxocarya (Benth.) Perkins

Species of tree

Hedycarya loxocarya, commonly known as yellow beech is a species of flowering plant in the family Monimiaceae, and is endemic to north-eastern Queensland. It is a small to medium tree with egg-shaped to elliptic leaves, and male and female flowers on separate plants. Male flowers are borne in clusters of 5 to 9 and have 8 tepals and more than 60 stamens and female flowers have 6 tepals and about 30 carpels. The fruit is a bright red, oval drupe.

== Description ==
Hedycarya loxocarya is a small to medium tree that typically grows to a height of 6–25 m (20–82 ft). Its leaves are egg-shaped with the narrower end towards the base, to elliptic, 55–145 mm (2.2–5.7 in) long and 23–65 mm (0.91–2.56 in) wide on a petiole 12–20 mm (0.47–0.79 in) long. The leaves are not toothed and the midvein is prominent on both surfaces. Male and female flowers are borne on separate plants. Male flowers are borne in clusters of 5 to 9, 20–50 mm (0.79–1.97 in) long, each flower more or less flattened cup-shaped, about 8–11 mm (0.31–0.43 in) in diameter on a densely hairy pedicel, mostly 3–8 mm (0.12–0.31 in) long, with 8 tepals in 2 whorls and more than 60 stamens. Female flowers are borne in groups of mostly 5 to 9, more or less cup-shaped, each flower on a pedicel 5–8 mm (0.20–0.31 in) long with 6 broadly triangular tepals and are mostly 5 mm (0.20 in) in diameter and 3 mm (0.12 in) high, on a pedicel 5–8 mm (0.20–0.31 in) long, with about 30 carpels. Flowering occurs from May to September, and the fruit is a bright red oval drupe, about 10 mm (0.39 in) long and 6 mm (0.24 in) wide.

== Taxonomy ==
This species was first formally described in 1870 by George Bentham who gave it the name Mollinedia loxocarya in his Flora Australiensis from specimens collected near Rockingham Bay by John Dallachy. In 1931,William Douglas Francis transferred the species to Hedycarya as H. loxocarya in the Bulletin of Miscellaneous Information, Royal Gardens, Kew.

== Distribution and habitat ==
Hedycarya loxocarya grows in rainforest or the edges of tall open forest, and is endemic to north-eastern Queensland from south of Cooktown to Paluma Range National Park, at altitudes between 350 and 1,150 m (1,150 and 3,770 ft).

== Conservation status ==
Hedycarya loxocarya is listed as of "least concern", by the Queensland Government Nature Conservation Act 1992.
