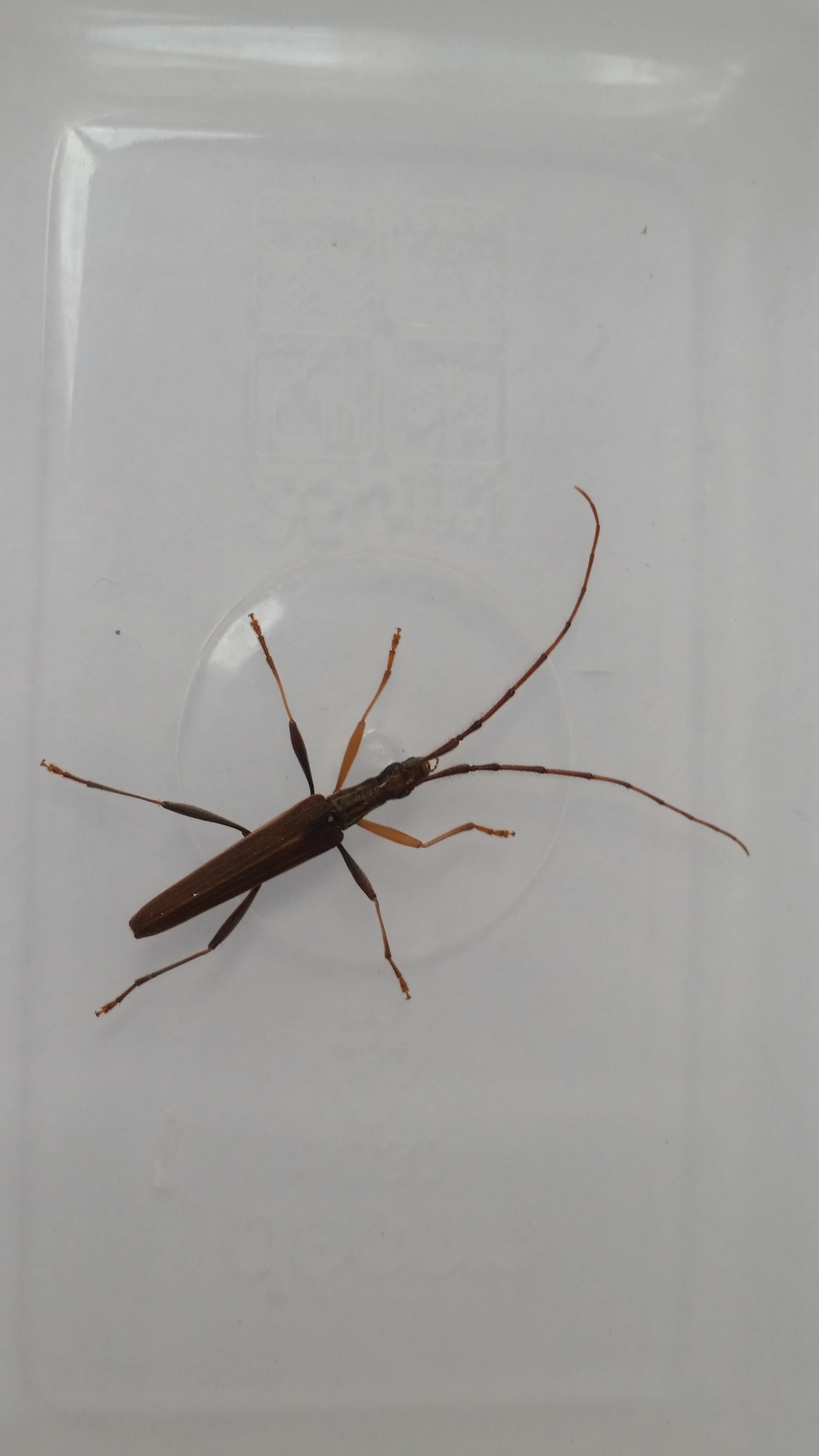
- Calliprason pallidus

Scientific classification
- Kingdom: Animalia
- Phylum: Arthropoda
- Class: Insecta
- Order: Coleoptera
- Suborder: Polyphaga
- Infraorder: Cucujiformia
- Family: Cerambycidae
- Tribe: Stenoderini
- Genus: Calliprason; White in White & Doubleday, 1843

Synonyms
- Stenopotes Pascoe, 1875; Drotus Sharp, 1877; Pseudocalliprason Broun, 1880; Epheus Broun, 1886

= Calliprason =

Genus of beetles

Calliprason is a longhorn beetle genus in the family Cerambycinae.

== Species ==
- Calliprason costifer
- Calliprason elegans
- Calliprason marginatum
- Calliprason pallidum
- Calliprason sinclairi
