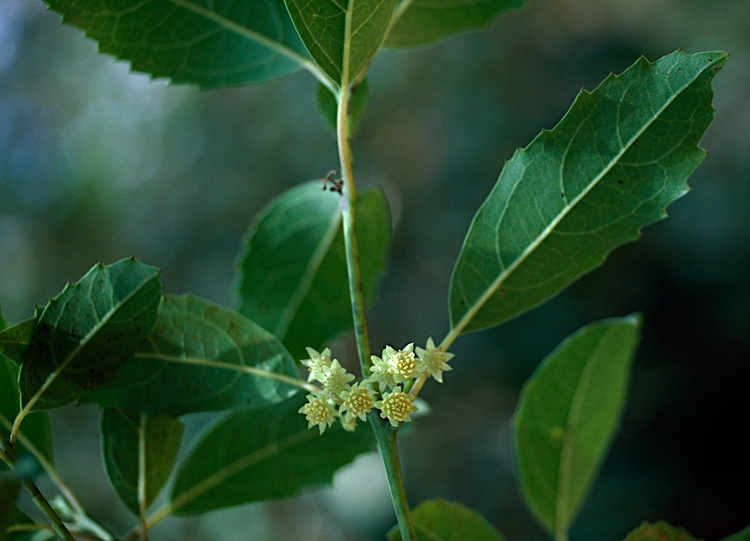
- Female flowers

Scientific classification
- Kingdom: Plantae
- Clade: Tracheophytes
- Clade: Angiosperms
- Clade: Magnoliids
- Order: Laurales
- Family: Monimiaceae
- Genus: Hedycarya
- Species: H. angustifolia

Binomial name
- Hedycarya angustifolia A.Cunn.

= Hedycarya angustifolia =

Species of tree

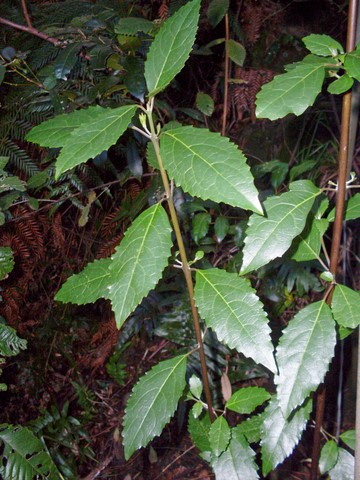
In a moist gully in the Blue Mountains National Park

Hedycarya angustifolia, commonly known as native mulberry, Australian mulberry, or djelwuck is a species of flowering plant in the family Monimiaceae, and is endemic to eastern Australia. It is a shrub or small tree with elliptic or egg-shaped to lance-shaped leaves and male and female flowers on separate plants. Male flowers are borne in branched clusters of 5 to 16 and have 8 tepals and about 50 stamens and female flowers have about 12 tepals and 40 to 50 carpels. The fruit is a more or less spherical, tightly clustered yellow or orange drupes.

== Description ==
Hedycarya angustifolia is a shrub or small tree that typically grows to a height of 2–10 m (6 ft 7 in – 32 ft 10 in). Its leaves are elliptic or egg-shaped to lance-shaped, 40–160 mm (1.6–6.3 in) long and 15–60 mm (0.59–2.36 in) wide on a petiole 15–40 mm (0.59–1.57 in) long. The leaves are coarsely toothed and the midvein is prominent on both surfaces. Male and female flowers are borne on separate plants. Male flowers are borne in clusters of 5 to 16, 15–20 mm (0.59–0.79 in) long, each flower more or less flattened cup-shaped, about 6 mm (0.24 in) in diameter on a pedicel 4–8 mm (0.16–0.31 in) long with 8 tepals and about 50 stamens. Female flowers are borne in groups of 2 to 4, more or less cup-shaped, each flower on a pedicel 8–10 mm (0.31–0.39 in) long with 12 small tepals and mostly about 6 mm (0.24 in) in diameter on a pedicel 8–10 mm (0.31–0.39 in) long, with 40–50 carpels. Flowering occurs from May to November, and the fruit is a spherical drupe in tight clusters that turns yellow or orange, about 3.5 mm (0.14 in) in diameter.

== Taxonomy ==
Hedycarya angustifolia was first formally described in 1838 by Allan Cunningham in the Annals of Natural History from specimens collected "in ravines in the Blue Mountains" in 1834 by his brother Richard. The specific epithet (angustifolia) means "narrow-leaved".

== Distribution and habitat ==
Hedycarya angustifolia grows in and near the margins of rainforest, often in moist mountain gullies, and is widespread from south-east Queensland, through eastern New South Wales and eastern and southern Victoria to King Island in Tasmania.

== Conservation status ==
Hedycarya angustifolia is listed as "rare", under the Tasmanian Government Threatened Species Protection Act 1995.

== Uses ==
Indigenous Australians used the wood for spear tips and to make bow drills.
