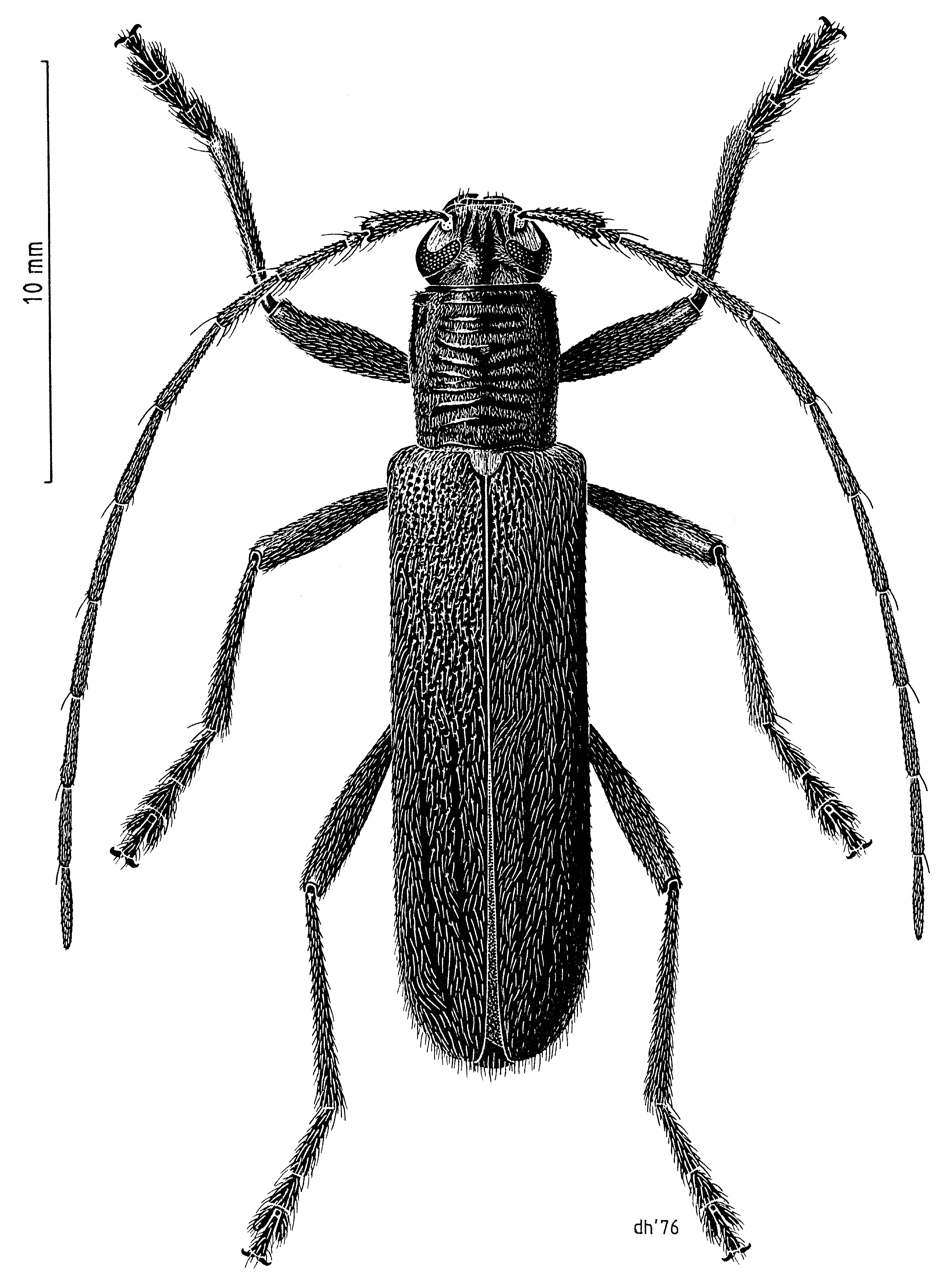
- Oemona hirta by Des Helmore

Scientific classification
- Kingdom: Animalia
- Phylum: Arthropoda
- Clade: Pancrustacea
- Class: Insecta
- Order: Coleoptera
- Suborder: Polyphaga
- Infraorder: Cucujiformia
- Family: Cerambycidae
- Genus: Oemona; Fabricius, 1775
- Species: O. hirta

Binomial name
- Oemona hirta Fabricius, 1775

= Oemona hirta =

Species of beetle

Oemona hirta, the lemon tree borer, also known as the whistling beetle or the singing beetle, is a longhorn beetle endemic to New Zealand. Its larvae are generalist feeders, boring into the wood of a wide variety of trees, native and introduced. When citrus orchards were first established in New Zealand, this beetle started inflicting serious damage, and so gained the name "lemon tree borer". Four species within the genus Oemona have been identified, suggesting that more species could be found. When disturbed by predators or humans, the adult beetle stridulates creating a "rasp" or "squeak" sound by rubbing its thorax and head together against an area of thin ridges. Māori would eat a liquid called "pia manuka", which was produced by manuka trees when its wood was damaged by the larvae. When Captain Cook first arrived in NZ, his naturalists, Banks and Solander, collected a lemon tree borer in their first collection between 1769 and 1771. This oldest collected specimen can be found in the British Museum. A few years after the first collection, the species would be first described by the Danish naturalist Fabricius in 1775.

== Description ==
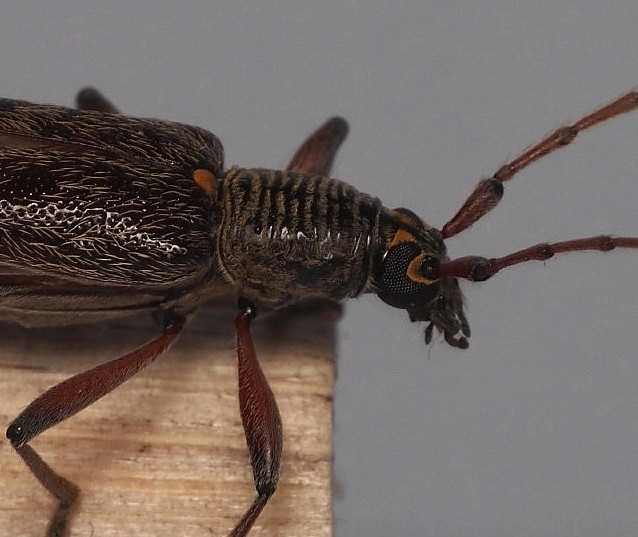
Lemon tree borer, showing the distinctive parallel ridges on the thorax

Adults: The lemon tree borer is a plain looking, medium to large sized beetle, reaching 15 to 25 mm (0.6–1.0 in) long. It has a slender body with elongated antennae. Antennae are usually the same length as or longer than the body, and able to sit in front of, or curve backwards against the body. Adults can vary from red-brown to almost black in colour, with patches of pale yellow hairs on the head and scutellum, which is a small spot on their back where the thorax joins the elytra (hard wing cases). Females are larger and heavier than males, but have proportionally shorter antennae, but the sex can only be reliably determined by looking at the genitalia using a microscope. A distinctive feature of O. hirta is the transverse wrinkling on the dorsal surface of the pronotum; this is especially distinctive on males.

Eggs: White and large (2.0-2.2mm) with a fine waxy surface pattern, they are laid singly in leaf or stem junctions, pruning and cicada scars, damaged bark or dead twigs on the outer edge of trees.

Larvae: Their skin is white to pale cream with orange to brown gut contents, growing 25-40mm long. Body is cylindrical with each thoracic and abdominal segment having a swollen transverse ridge; an enlarged head holds gouge-like mandibles (biting jaws) which are large but short and dark brown to black. Many minute rigid brown hairs line the lateral margins, especially towards the head. When disturbed, larvae are able to move surprisingly fast due to dorsal and ventral muscle ridges gripping its surroundings.

Pupae: Approximately 20-25mm long. Pupa are a pale reddish clay colour with darker shades on the wing cases. The pupa chamber is a short length of larval tunnel with tightly packed wood shaving plugs at each end. The beetle shape is more obvious in the pupal stage, showing long antennae folded adjacent to the body and larger legs bended in. While the individual is pupating, it can twist around the chamber using small black spines on its abdomen.

== Life cycle ==
Lemon tree borers have a long life cycle, averaging around two years, with the majority of their life spent as larvae. Eggs are singly laid between September and January and hatch in as little as a few days to two weeks, with most hatching between 9–13 days. Once hatched larvae immediately start tunnelling into the wood, going first into sapwood and then heartwood to around 10-20mm deep. Larvae occur in low density, with usually only two being present per tree. They eat the wood, creating long tunnels with side galleries and holes for excretion of frass and aeration to discourage fungal growth. They bore longitudinally into the stems, going towards the main stem or branch. Occasionally larvae will bore around a branch, causing girdling. Lemon tree borers can sometimes be found in dead trees, but prefer living trees as they require a certain level of humidity and nutrition to properly pupate to adulthood. The larval stage can last for one to two years, depending on the environment: larvae occurring in milder environments with a shorter winter period will pupate faster. Larvae achieve modest growth over their first summer reaching around 15mm and mine approximately 150mm. The larvae slow in activity over the winter months but increase substantially around October when temperatures become warmer. Increased frass occurs in their second summer as larvae reach full size. The pupal stage lasts between 2–3 weeks but can take up to several weeks, and begins late May to early November with larvae creating a small chamber within their tunnel. Adults emerge early spring to late summer with the majority emerging October to December. Newly emerged adults will remain in their pupal cells until their integument has hardened. Once they emerge, they become sexually mature around four days later (although this varies depending on environmental conditions). Adults feed on pollen and nectar of plants. They are mostly nocturnal, foraging and mating at night. During the day, they hide amongst vegetation. Adults may live for around 2 months but often die after reproduction.

== Mating behaviour ==
Adults reach sexual maturity approximately 3–4 days after emergence, but usually take around 10 days before being able to reproduce. Oemona hirta, like other cerambycid beetles, don't produce sex pheromones to attract a potential mate over long distance; instead they tend to meet at oviposition locations where mating occurs. Mating usually occurs at night with males having been observed to wander in search of a mate and stumble across a female more than actively locate a mate. Pre-mounting courtship displays appear to not occur and males quickly mount the females after coming into contact with them. Lemon tree borer have a comparatively long mating period with potential multiple mating sessions occurring. However, the final mating appears to take the longest, with total mating taking around 50 minutes. Majority of males conduct mate-guarding as post-mating behaviour for approximately 20 minutes after mating by staying on the back of the female or remaining close by to ensure his sperm alone will father their off-spring. Whenever the female is unresponsive, trying to move away from the male's advances, he would nip the female's antennae of lick the front of her thorax or elytra. The female would then calm down and raise her abdomen up again for him to continue. This is falls in the middle of mating behaviours of other longhorn species where the male will either mate with the female for a few hours without post-mating and guarding, or mate for a few minutes then leave to allow other males to mate with her. Once the male withdraws the female has been observed to remain stationary for a short period of time before starting oviposition alone. Females lay eggs in cracks or wounds in bark or on branches including fresh pruning cuts. Females can produce over 50 eggs in their life span and lay only around 66% of eggs produced.

== Habitat and distribution ==
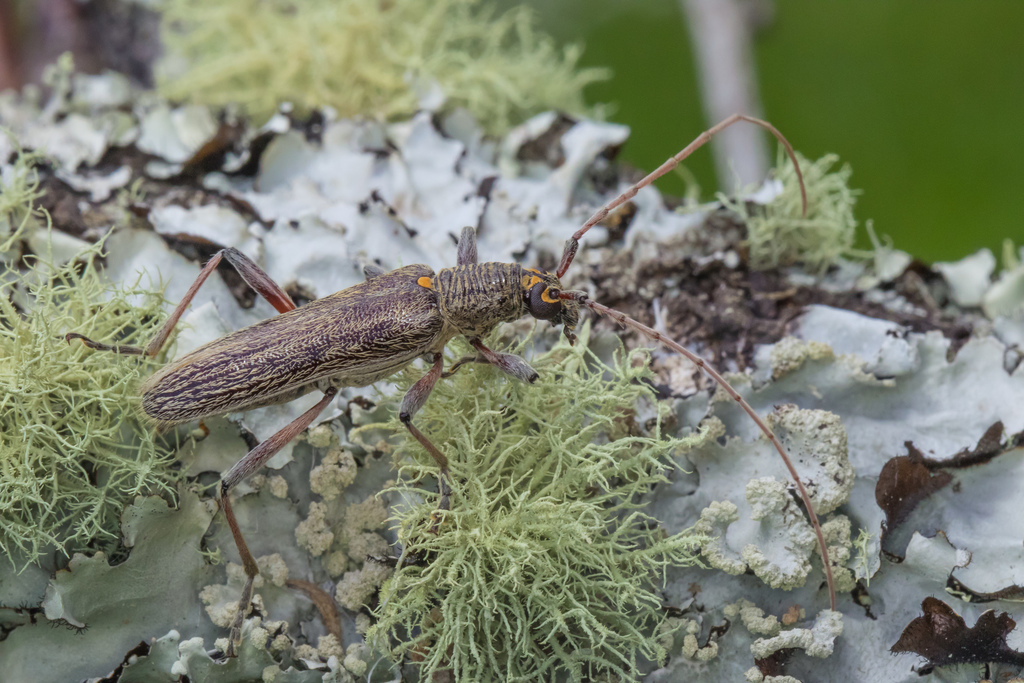
Oemona hirta on lichen

Family distribution -

Oemona hirta belong to a large family of longhorn beetles, called Cerambycidae. Worldwide, the group contains over 33,000 species, within NZ there could be around 200-300 species. The longhorn family have significant impacts to the economy, these impacts are mainly due to the larva's ability to process and damage hard wood with their specialised mandibles. This makes them high on international security threat lists as new introductions from accidental imports would result in devastating loss to timber and horticultural industries.

Global range -

Oemona hirta is endemic to New Zealand (NZ) and has not established overseas, but there have been a few close occasions. This includes individuals being identified in the UK by Food & Environment Research Agency in 1983, and again in 2010. The latest specimen was found in an imported wisteria plant from NZ and classified as a devastating pest for the agricultural industry, if it were to settle.

New Zealand range -

Within NZ, lemon tree borers are native and the most commonly found longhorn beetle in NZ. Until recently, it was assumed that they were widespread throughout New Zealand, but they are mainly located in the North Island, and the North-West Nelson region of the South Island (Crowe, A. 2015; Lindsey & Morris, 2013). It has been collected from sea level up to altitudes of over 1,200 m (3,900 ft), as well as several offshore islands such as Kapiti Island and Mokopuna Island. Like most other longhorn beetles, their good flying ability allows them to colonise favourable habitat, and spread far and wide. The beetles mainly fly in the early morning and evening when most mating occurs.

== Diet ==
Like their name suggests, this species larvae prefer to eat living vascular tissue of citrus trees, but they are not specialised to citrus. Prior to European settlers introducing exotic plants and cultivated trees over 150 years ago, premature specimen lived in native trees. Now they are a highly polyphagous species invading native and introduced host trees and vines totalling over 200 species from 81 families. This shows how adaptable the species can be, indicating that they will be in NZ for many years to come. This creates a nuisance to cultivated orchards and tree nurseries in the North Island who can frequently be invaded. Adults can be found in orchards, and gardens feeding on plants too, but are far less destructive than the larvae, instead consuming pollen and nectar of native and exotic flowers.

=== Common host plants ===
Exotic - Citrus, lemon, orange, tangelos, grape, apple, gooseberry, tamarillo, cherry, fig, peach, pomegranate, plum, blueberry, persimmon, camellia, elm, wisteria, willow, hakea, poplar, tree lucerne, almond, walnut, chestnut, and macadamia. Gorse is also one of the hosts that they're known to target providing one of the few benefits to controlling the weed in NZ.

Native - Kowhai, rangiora, mahoe, tauhinu, tarata, Coprosma rotundifolia, and manuka.

== Agricultural pest ==
This species is of great economic importance and has become an agricultural pest due to the broad host diet and habit of the larvae, which bore into a wide range of host trees, both native and exotic. Some important crop species are lemon (Citrus spp.), apple (Malus spp.), almond (Amygdalus spp.), chestnut (Castanea sativa and C. crenata), persimmon (Diospyros kaki), cherry (Prunus spp.), walnut (Juglans regia), and grape (Vitis vinifera). This has made them a substantial commercial and biosecurity pest as their potential for wide spread crop damage both in New Zealand and overseas is high. As such, quarantine regulations have to be observed when exporting these crops overseas to reduce the risk of O. hirta being accidentally introduced, as they would be able to establish quickly. O. hirta is a threat to the forestry industry, commercial fruit crops, and ornamental garden shrubs. This beetle can be accidentally introduced by movement of plants for planting. It was first intercepted in the United Kingdom in 1983 and again in 2010 on Wisteria plants at two different plant nurseries.

=== Plant symptoms ===
The first symptom of an infestation by larvae is the wilting of foliage and dieback, but this may not always be apparent immediately. Trees will have excretion holes measuring 1–3 mm (0.039–0.118 in), with frass visible on the outside. As the larva tunnels through the living branches of young hardwood trees and vines, the stems weaken, dry and break. This reduces the plants health rapidly, or even killing the tree over time if there is a manifestation. Boring through the stem interrupts the sap flow which results in die-back in the late summer. It can also make the host susceptible to fungal infection from weakened stems and holes created by the larva.

== Control of Oemona hirta ==
Lemon tree borers are notoriously hard to control. Larvae are not easily seen as they live deep in the wood making their natural behaviour hard to observe and creating difficulty for people to control them as a pest. Physical control can be done by removal of infested wood, but this is very labour-intensive. The usual way of dealing with insect pests is to spray chemicals, this may be effective for the adults, however this is time-consuming and ineffective as the larvae are internally hidden. In New Zealand, the best way to control the lemon tree borer is through preventive and curative methods. To reduce infestations, plants affected need to be regularly pruned, with the offcuts removed and burned. However, this shouldn't be done when females are laying eggs as it will create more suitable places for larvae to infect, so painting the ends of trimmed branches can be used to discourage reinfection. Another thing that can make Oemona hirta more difficult to remove it that larvae can continue maturing to adulthood in pruned twigs/branches on the ground. However, the required conditions for survival would be that they were at an old enough stage that they could continue eating before the water and nutrients decay. Ways to enhance biocontrol are being investigated, although it is hard as the stems they live in protect them from most predators. However, their natural predator, the native parasitoid wasps are being investigated.

== Predators and disease ==
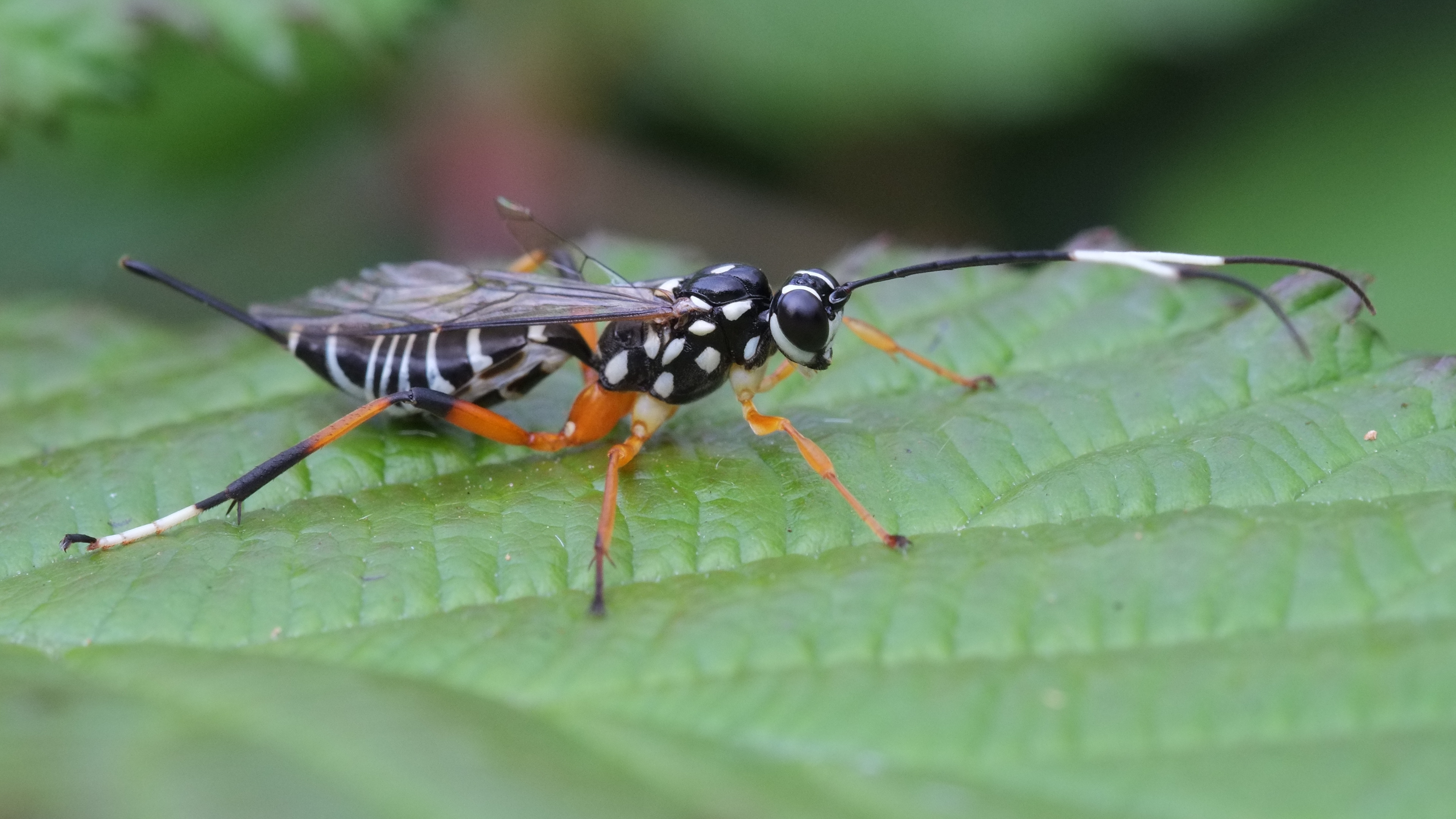
Lemon tree borer parasite (Xanthocryptus novozealandicus)

The main natural predators of lemon tree borers are solitary parasitoid wasps, two ichneumond wasp species (Xanthocryptus novozealandicus and Campoplex sp.) and one braconid wasp species (Apsicolpus hudsoni). The parasitic ichneumonid wasp Xanthocryptus novozealandicus is native to New Zealand and being researched as a potential biological control agent. The female wasps parasitise wood-boring beetles, including lemon tree borer, by injecting an egg into the larvae which then grows and consumes the slowly dying grub. Females do this by piercing through the wood with their ovipositor. X. novozealandicus prefers attacking larvae in their second year of growth. Female wasps appear to assign their offspring according to the size of the larvae, in most cases larger larvae will host female offspring and smaller larvae host male offspring. This is suggested to be due to the larger size of the adult female wasp compared to the male. On examination of the remaining larval galleries it could be seen that upon being parasitised that larvae development halts. Additionally, a parasitic fungi Cordyceps aemonae has been documented to affect larvae.
