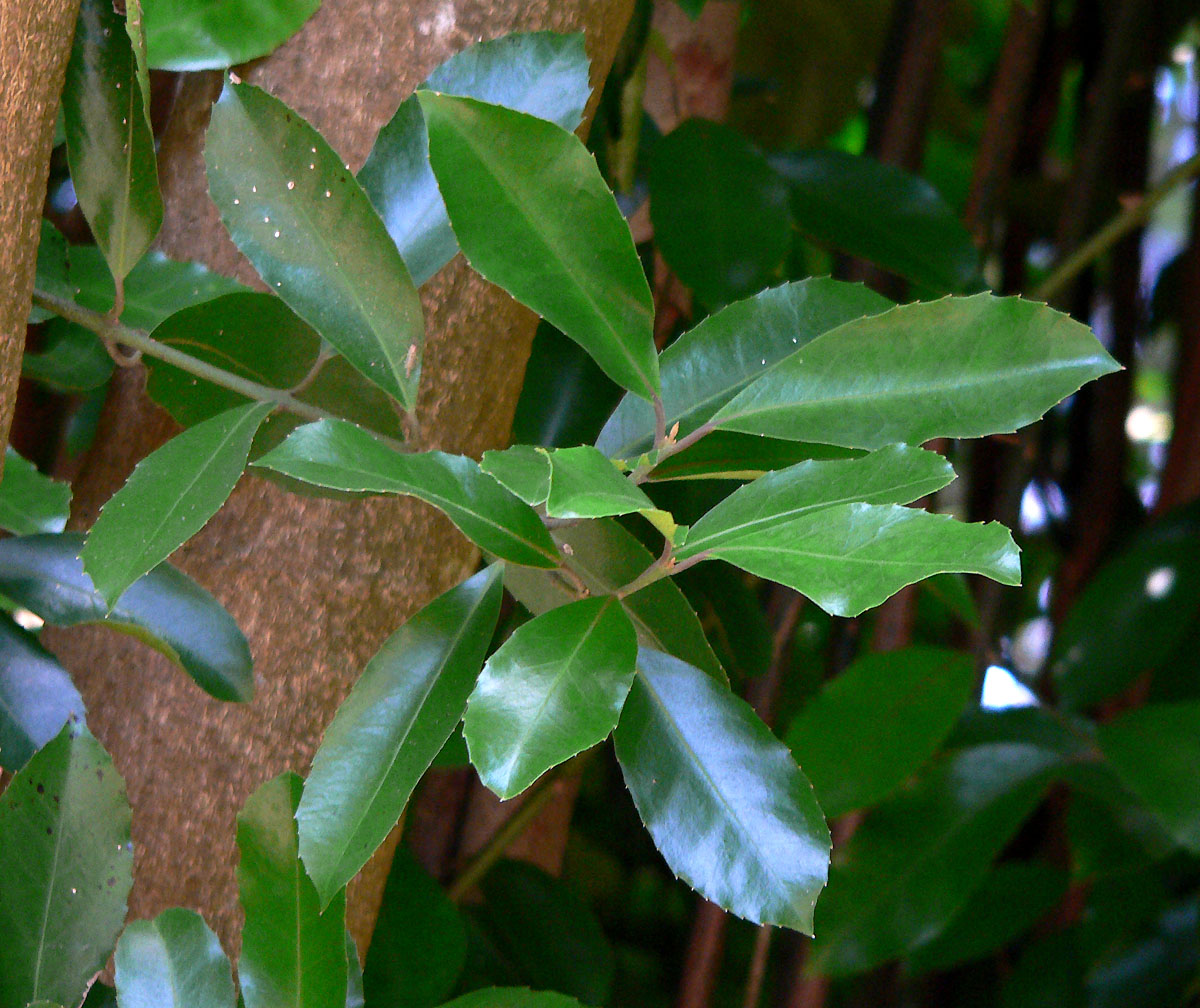
- Hedycarya arborea

Scientific classification
- Kingdom: Plantae
- Clade: Tracheophytes
- Clade: Angiosperms
- Clade: Magnoliids
- Order: Laurales
- Family: Monimiaceae
- Genus: Hedycarya; J.R.Forst. & G.Forst.

Species
- 16; see text

Synonyms
- Carnegiea Perkins (1911), nom. illeg.; Carnegieodoxa Perkins (1914); Monimiopsis Vieill. ex Perkins (1911)

= Hedycarya =

Genus of flowering plants

Hedycarya is a genus of about 16 species of flowering plants in the family Monimiaceae native to eastern Australia, New Zealand, and some Pacific Islands. Plants in the genus Hedycarya are shrubs, or small to medium trees with sometimes toothed leaves. The male and female flowers cup-shaped and are borne on separate plants. Male flowers usually have 8 tepals and many stamens and female flowers have 6 to 12 tepals with many carpels. The fruit is a cluster of drupes.

== Description ==
Plants in the genus Hedycarya are shrubs, or small to medium trees with male and female flowers on separate plants. Its leaves are papery to slightly leathery, sometimes regularly and coarsely toothed. The flowers are borne in more or less cup-shaped, raceme-like cymes or panicles in leaf axils or on the ends of branches, with up to 20 flowers. Male flowers usually have many stamens, the filaments very short to absent and female flowers have many carpels with a short, thick stigma and sometimes staminodes. The fruit is a loose to tight cluster of drupes.

== Taxonomy ==
The genus was Hedycarya was first formerly described in 1776 by botanists Johann and Georg Forster in Characteres Generum Plantarum.

The limit of the genus may require change as it appears paraphyletic in phylogenetic analyses, with the genera Kibaropsis and Levieria nested in it.

== Species ==
The names of 16 species of Hedycara are accepted by the Plants of the World Online as at May 2024.

- Hedycarya alternifolia Hemsl. ('Eua (Tonga))
- Hedycarya angustifolia A.Cunn. – native mulberry, Australian mulberry (southeastern Queensland, New South Wales, Victoria, and Tasmania)
- Hedycarya aragoensis Jérémie (New Caledonia)
- Hedycarya arborea J.R.Forst. & G.Forst. – pigeonwood, porokaiwhiri, poporokaiwhiri (New Zealand)
- Hedycarya baudouinii Baill. (New Caledonia)
- Hedycarya chrysophylla Perkins (New Caledonia)
- Hedycarya cupulata Baill. (New Caledonia)
- Hedycarya denticulata (A.Gray) Perkins & Gilg (Samoan Islands and Tonga)
- Hedycarya dorstenioides A.Gray (Fiji, Tonga, and Vanuatu)
- Hedycarya engleriana S.Moore (New Caledonia)
- Hedycarya erythrocarpa Perkins (New Caledonia)
- Hedycarya loxocarya (Benth.) W.D.Francis (northeastern Queensland)
- Hedycarya parvifolia Perkins & Schltr. (New Caledonia)
- Hedycarya perbracteolata Jérémie (New Caledonia)
- Hedycarya rivularis Guillaumin (New Caledonia)
- Hedycarya symplocoides S.Moore (New Caledonia)
