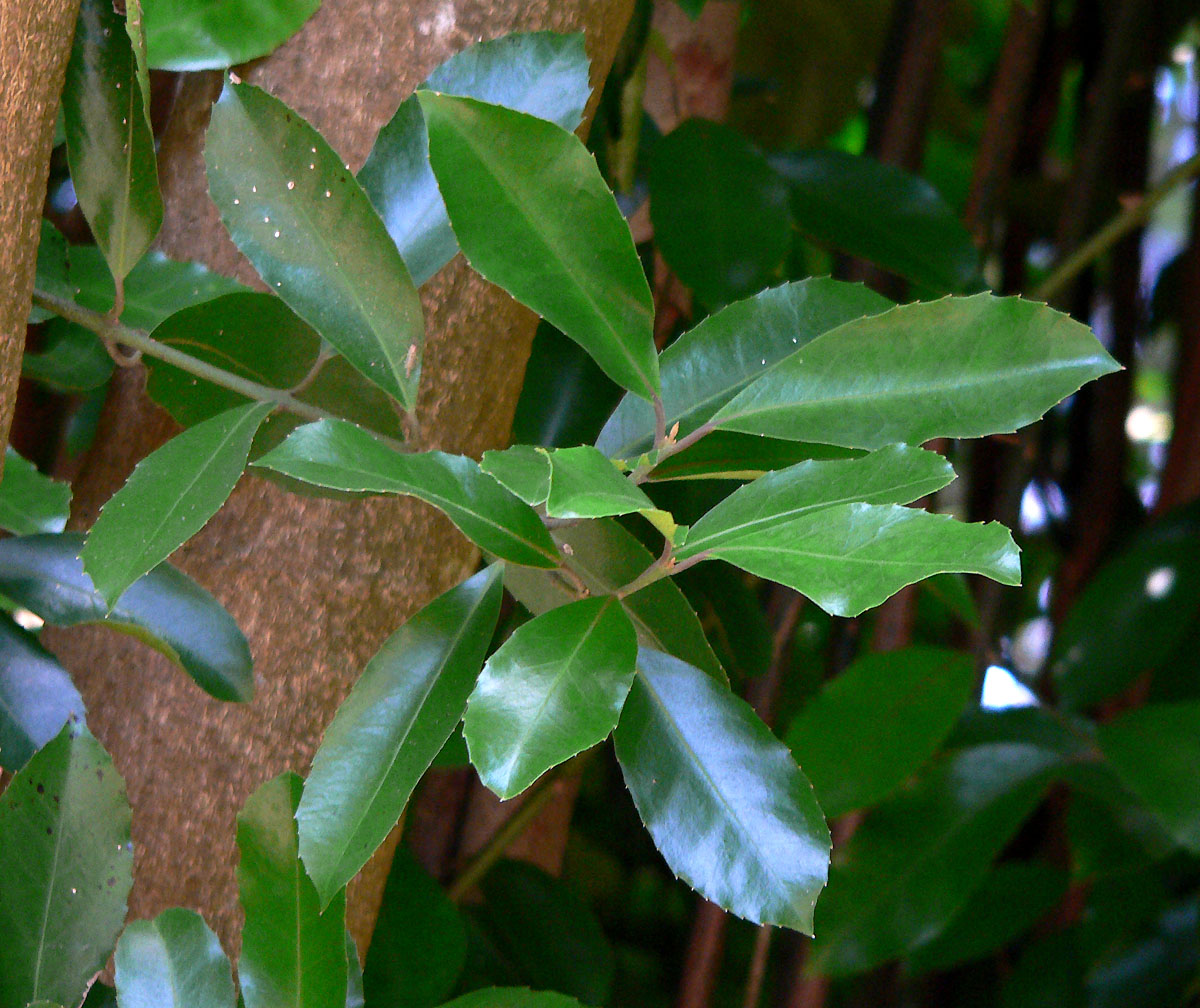
- Foliage of Hedycarya arborea

Conservation status
- Not Threatened (NZ TCS)

Scientific classification
- Kingdom: Plantae
- Clade: Embryophytes
- Clade: Tracheophytes
- Clade: Angiosperms
- Clade: Magnoliids
- Order: Laurales
- Family: Monimiaceae
- Genus: Hedycarya
- Species: H. arborea

Binomial name
- Hedycarya arborea J.R.Forst. & G.Forst.

Synonyms
- Hedycarya dentata G.Forst.; Hedycarya scabra A.Cunn.; Zanthoxylum novae-zelandiae A.Rich.

= Hedycarya arborea =

Species of flowering plant

Hedycarya arborea, commonly known as pigeonwood and porokaiwhiri, is a species of shrub or small tree in the family Monimiaceae. It is endemic to New Zealand; its range covers the North and South Islands. It is also found on the Manawatāwhi / Three Kings Islands. The species is highly shade-tolerant and is commonly found in wet environments. It reaches a height of up to 12 metres (40 feet) and produces bright orange to red fruits.

Hedycarya arborea was first scientifically described in 1776 by the German naturalists Georg and Johann Reinhold Forster. H. arborea is primarily wind-pollinated. The fruits are dispersed by fruit-eating animals (frugivores), such as birds. The fruits are not edible and may be poisonous. The indigenous Māori people did not traditionally eat the fruits, although they did use the tree as a source of timber, and the leaves had some medicinal uses. H. arborea's 2023 conservation status in the New Zealand Threat Classification System was "Not Threatened".

== Description ==
Hedycarya arborea (pigeonwood) is a dioecious species of shrub or small tree that reaches heights of up to 12 metres (40 feet) tall, with a trunk up to 0.5 m (1 ft 8 in) in diameter. Its bark is firm and dark grey to brown-grey in colour. The wood is white and straight-grained. Leaves are dark green in colour and arranged oppositely. They are mostly coriaceous (leather-like) or glabrous (smooth). The underside of the leaves are similar, but they are a paler colour. Its petioles are usually 10–20 mm (0.4–0.8 in) long. Its laminae (leaf blades) are usually 40–120 mm × 25–30 mm (1.6–4.7 in × 1–1.2 in) long, broadly oval to egg-shaped, narrowing to the base, and the margins are partly serrated or toothed. Plants from northernmost populations have larger leaves.

The inflorescences (flower clusters) are branched racemes. The peduncles and pedicels are slender. The male perianths are tiny, about 10 mm (0.4 in) in diameter, and the female perianths are about 6 mm (0.2 in) in diameter. De Lange (2026) states fruiting occurs from March to June; however, Crowe (2009) gives the period as spring to summer. The fruits produce drupes. Each ovoid fruit, 10–15 mm (0.4–0.6 in) long and red or orange-red in colour, contains one seed. Endocarps are 9–14 mm (0.35–0.55 in) long, usually oval to egg-shaped, rarely round, and brown to grey-brown in colour.

== Gallery ==
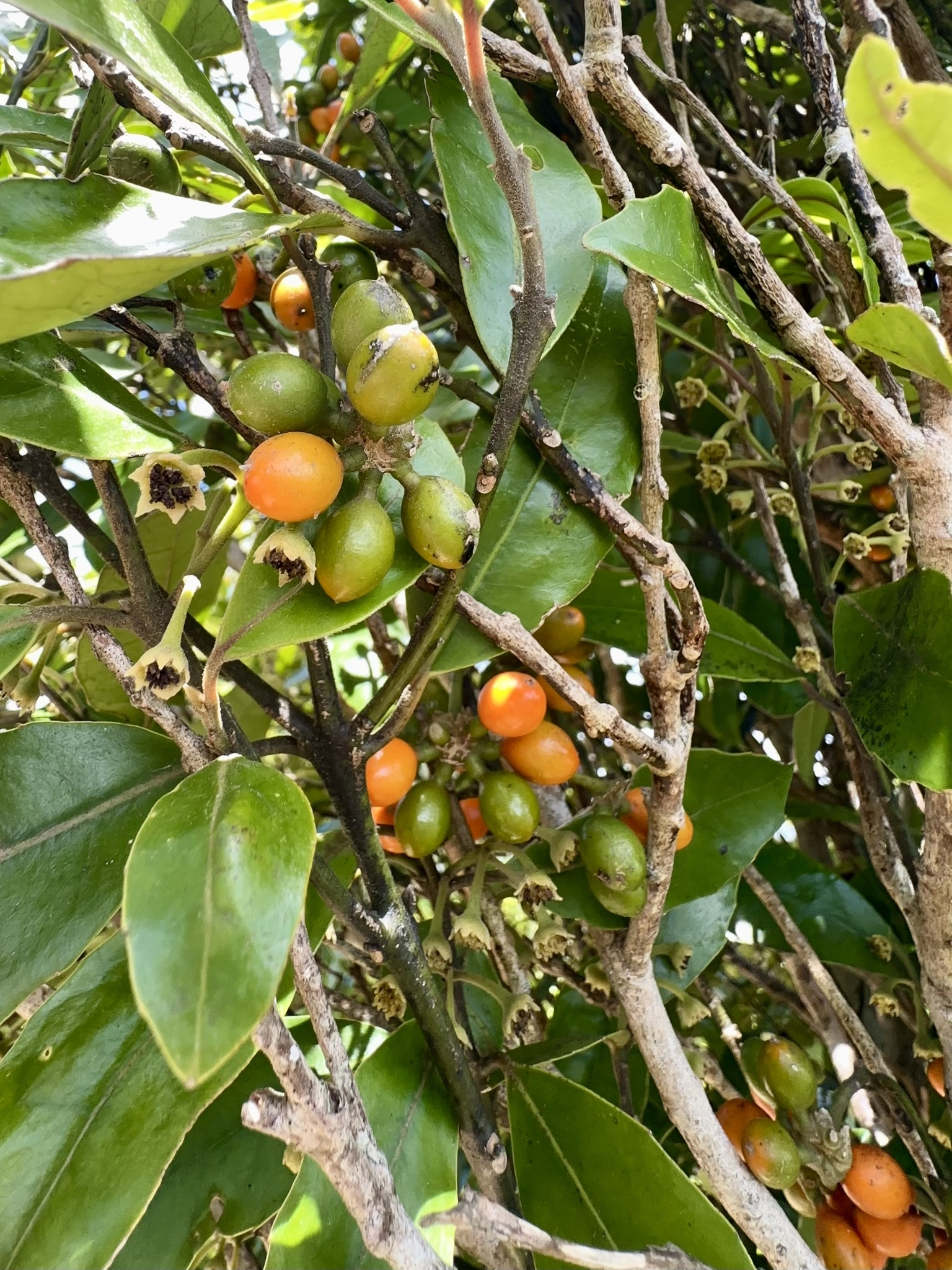
Clusters of fruit

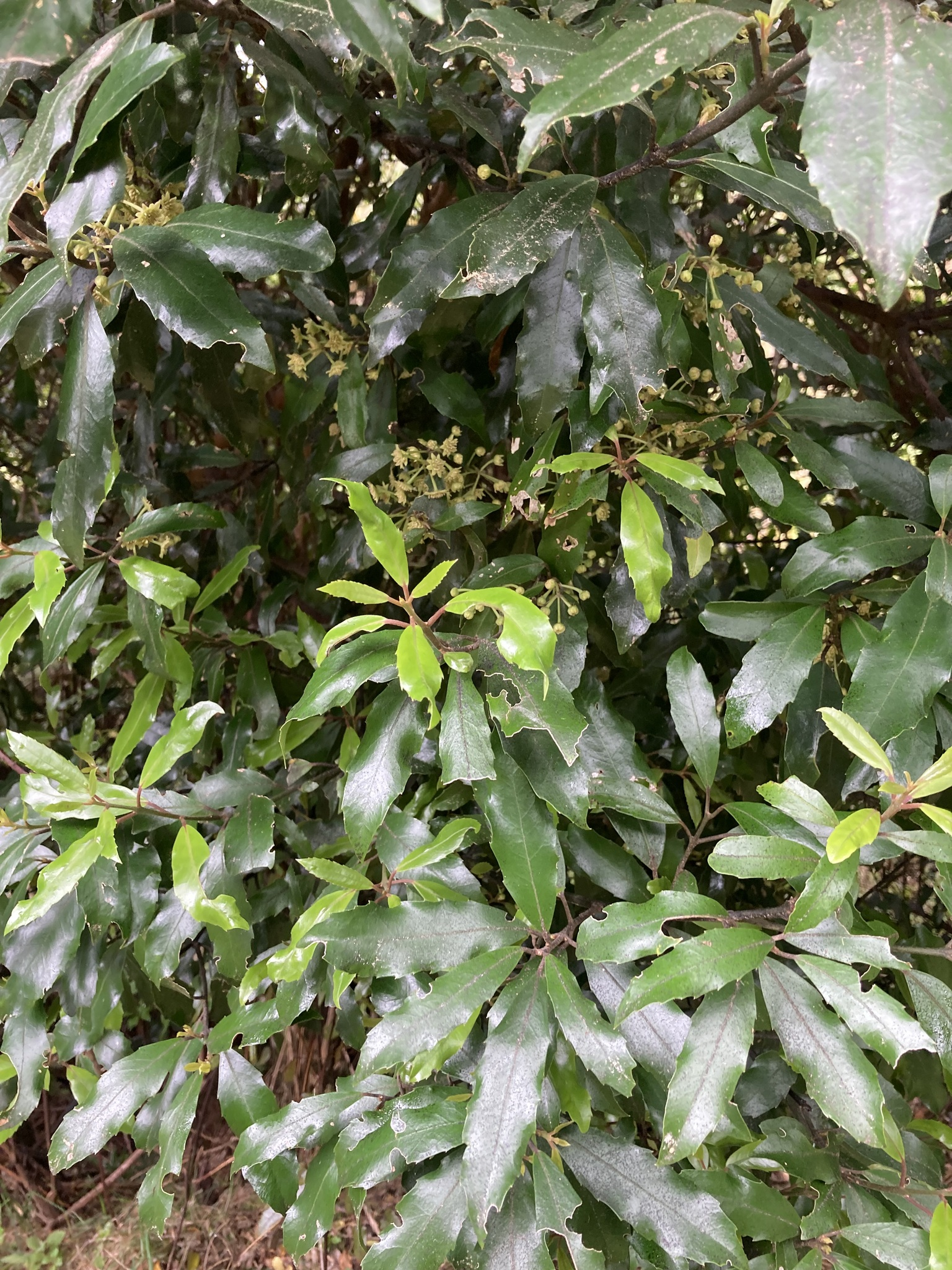
Dark green foliage

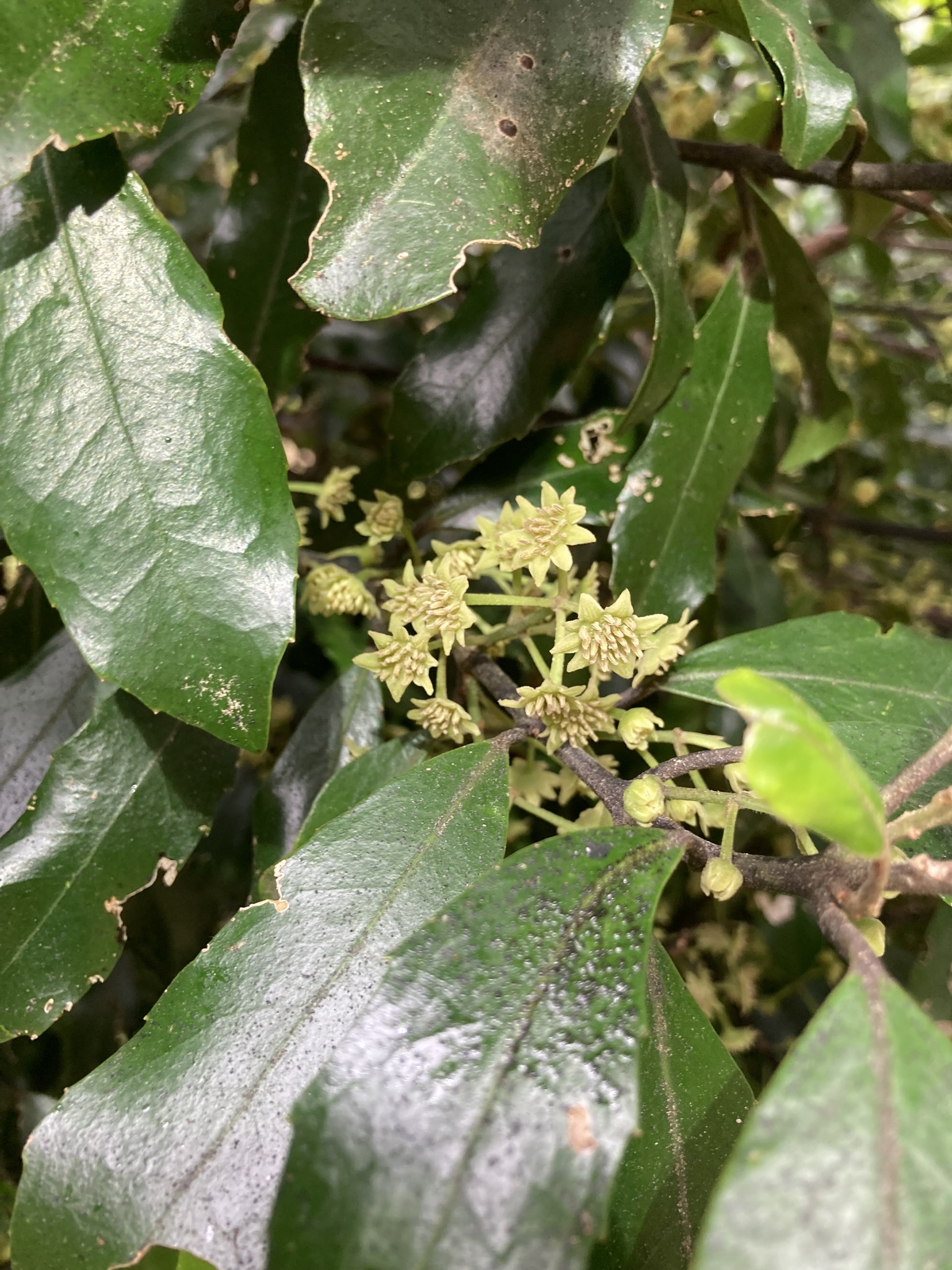
Flowering specimen

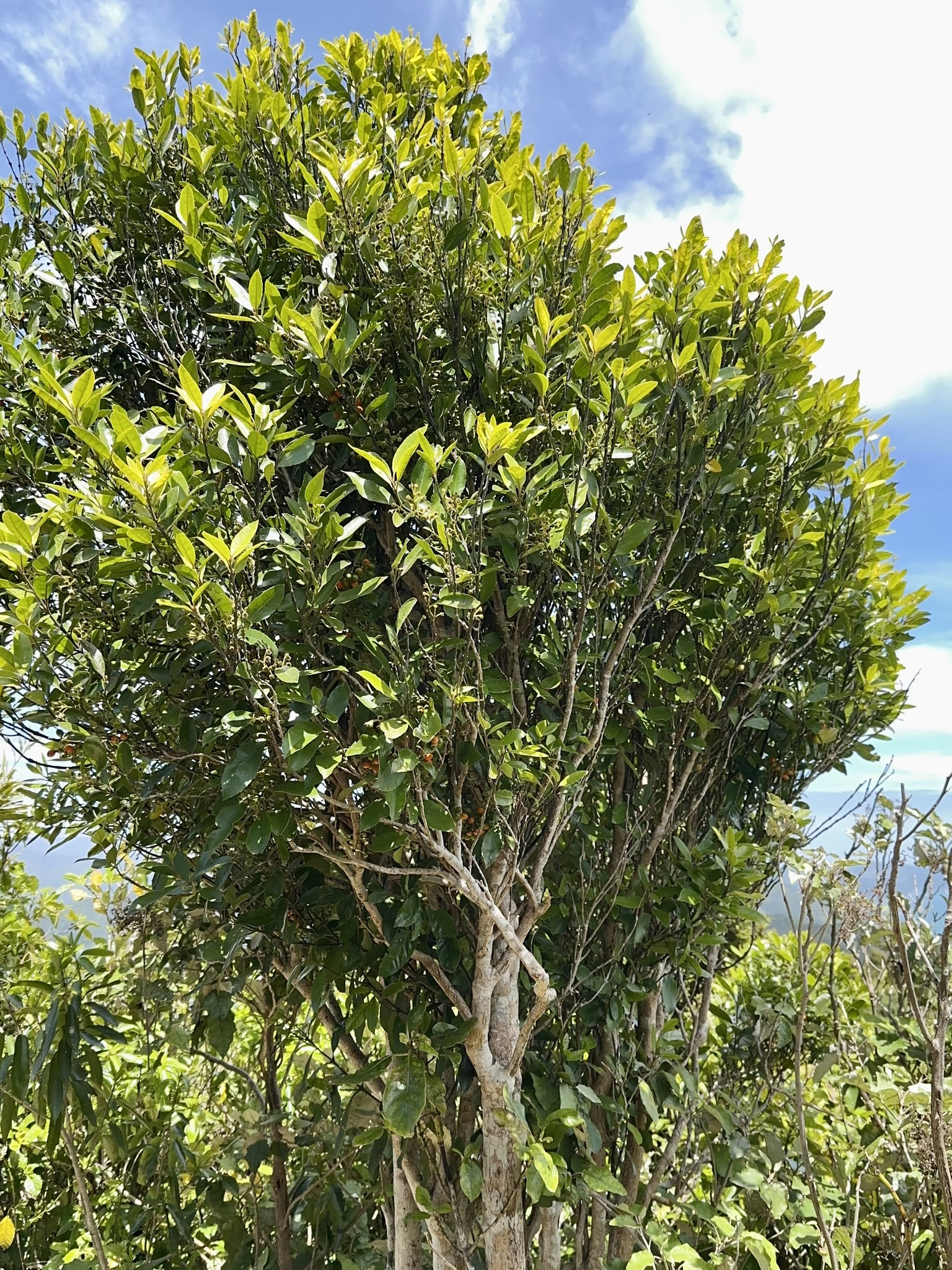
A mature specimen

A preserved specimen

== Taxonomy ==
Hedycarya arborea was first described in 1776 by the German naturalists Georg and Johann Reinhold Forster. The lineage consisting of the genus Hedycarya, according to Conran et al. (2016), possibly dates to the early Eocene. There are three synonyms of H. arborea: H. dentata, H. scabra, and Zanthoxylum novae-zelandiae, described by Georg Forster, Allan Cunningham, and Achille Richard, respectively. There are sixteen species of this genus currently accepted by the Plants of the World Online taxonomic database. These species are native to Oceania, namely Australia, New Zealand, Fiji, Tonga, New Caledonia, Samoa, and Vanuatu.

=== Etymology ===
The etymology of H. arborea's genus name, Hedycarya, derives from the Ancient Greek ηδυ-καρπον (hedys-krayon; "sweet-nut"). The specific epithet arborea means "tree-like", deriving from the Latin arbor ("tree"). The species is commonly known as pigeonwood in English and porokaiwhiri in Māori. The name "pigeonwood" comes from the kererū (wood pigeons) that feed on its fruit. There are many recorded Māori language names for the plant, such as pōporokaiwhiria and kōporokaiwhiri.

== Ecology ==
Hedycarya arborea's seeds are dispersed by fruit-eating animals (frugivores), such as birds. Several birds have been recorded as seed dispersers, such as blackbirds (Turdus merula), kererū (Hemiphaga novaeseelandiae), kōkako (Callaeas), tūī (Prosthemadera novaeseelandiae), song thrushes (Turdus philomelos), and weka (Gallirallus australis). The extinct huia (Heteralocha acutirostris) ate them too. H. arborea is primarily wind-pollinated. Leaves are eaten by introduced deer and goats, while possums instead prefer eating the buds and flowers. Rats also eat the fruits of the tree. H. arborea plays host to the endemic insects Lasiorhynchus barbicornis and Calliprason sinclairi.

== Distribution ==
Hedycarya arborea is endemic to New Zealand; its range primarily covers the North and South Islands. It also occurs on the Manawatāwhi / Three Kings Islands. It appears to be sparse on the eastern side of the South Island and grows south to the Banks Peninsula or Port Chalmers inside the Otago Harbour. H. arborea's range extends further south on the western side of the island, being found throughout the western side of the island. The botanist Thomas Kirk stated in his 1889 book The Forest Flora of New Zealand that the species' southern limit was Jackson Bay. However, more recent revisions of New Zealand flora suggest that the species is found throughout the western coast of the island or that the southern limit is Milford Sound. H. arborea does not naturally occur on the Chatham and Stewart Islands.

The conservation status of H. arborea was assessed by the IUCN Red List in 2024 as "Least Concern", and its population trend was evaluated as "Unknown". H. arborea's assessment in the New Zealand Threat Classification System was evaluated in 2023 as "Not Threatened".

=== Habitat ===
Hedycarya arborea is typically found in lowland and montane ecosystems, reaching 800 m (2,600 ft) at maximum elevation above sea level. It is a fast-growing, highly shade-tolerant species which is commonly found in wet environments. H. arborea commonly associates with akeake (Dodonaea viscosa), māhoe (Melicytus ramiflorus), ngaio (Myoporum laetum), and tītoki (Alectryon excelsus).

== Uses ==
The wood of Hedycarya arborea is soft and not very durable. The indigenous Māori people used the timber to make various musical instruments and digging sticks. H. arborea had some medicinal uses for Māori; it is known they used the leaves in vapour baths. They did not traditionally eat the fruits, and Wardle (2011) notes that The Poisonous Plants in New Zealand classifies the plant as poisonous. The plant has been suspected of poisoning cattle, and a dose of 14 grams (0.5 ounces) of leaves per 1 kilogram (2.2 pounds) of body weight was lethal to sheep.

== Works cited ==
Books

- Buller, Walter Lawry (1888). A History of the Birds of New Zealand (2 ed.). London, United Kingdom: Victoria Chambers – via the Biodiversity Heritage Library.
- Cheeseman, Thomas Frederick (1906). Manual of the New Zealand flora (1 ed.). Wellington, New Zealand: New Zealand Board of Science and Art – via the Internet Archive.
- Connor, Henry Eamonn (1977). The Poisonous Plants in New Zealand. New Zealand Department of Scientific and Industrial Research.
- Crowe, Andrew (2009). Which Native Tree? New Zealand Native Trees: A Simple Guide to their Identification, Ecology and Uses. Auckland, New Zealand: Penguin Books. ISBN 978-0-14-300899-6.
- Dawson, John; Lucas, Rob (2011). Field Guide to New Zealand's Native Trees. Nelson, New Zealand: Potton & Burton. ISBN 978-1-877517-01-3.
- Eagle, Audrey (2006). Eagle's Complete Trees and Shrubs of New Zealand. Vol. 1. Wellington, New Zealand: Te Papa Press. ISBN 0-909010-08-0.
- Garnock-Jones, Philip (2025). He Puāwai. Auckland, New Zealand: Auckland University Press. ISBN 978-1-77671-168-0.
- Gledhill, David (6 March 2008). The Names of Plants (4th ed.). Cambridge, United Kingdom: Cambridge University Press. doi:10.1017/CBO9780511550898. ISBN 978-0-521-68553-5.
- Kirk, Thomas (1889). The Forest Flora of New Zealand. Wellington, New Zealand: George Didsbury – via the Internet Archive.
- Wardle, John A. (2011). Wardle's Native Plants of New Zealand and Their Story. Bateson Publishing Limited. ISBN 978-1-877520-06-8.

Journals

- Burrows, Colin J. (1995). "Germination Behaviour of the Seeds of Six New Zealand Woody Plant Species". New Zealand Journal of Botany. 33 (3): 365–377. doi:10.1080/0028825X.1995.10412963. ISSN 0028-825X.
- Clout, Michael Norman; Hay, J. Rod (1989). "The Importance of Birds as Browsers, Pollinators and Seed Dispersers in New Zealand Forests". New Zealand Journal of Ecology. 12. New Zealand Ecological Society: 27–33. ISSN 0110-6465. JSTOR 24053245.
- Conran, John G.; Bannister, Jennifer M.; Mildenhall, Dallas C.; Lee, Daphne E. (2016). "Hedycarya Macrofossils and Associated Planarpollenites Pollen from the Early Miocene of New Zealand". American Journal of Botany. 103 (5): 938–956. doi:10.3732/ajb.1600047. ISSN 0002-9122.
- Daniel, Michael John (1973). "Seasonal Diet of the Ship Rat (Rattus r. rattus) in Lowland Forest in New Zealand". Proceedings (New Zealand Ecological Society). 20. New Zealand Ecological Society: 21–30. ISSN 0077-9946. JSTOR 24061506.

Websites

- De Lange, Peter (2026). "Hedycarya arborea". New Zealand Plant Conservation Network. Archived from the original on 4 November 2025.
- Svensson, Magdalena S. (2025). "Hedycarya arborea". IUCN Red List of Threatened Species. 2025 e.T254426990A254426992. doi:10.2305/IUCN.UK.2025-1.RLTS.T254426990A254426992.en.
- "Hedycarya arborea J.R.Forst. & G.Forst". The Royal Botanic Gardens, Kew, Harvard University Herbaria & Libraries and Australian National Herbarium. Archived from the original on 19 February 2024 – via International Plant Names Index.
- "Ngā Rauropi Whakaoranga — Hedycarya arborea. Pigeonwood. Porokaiwhiri". Manaaki Whenua – Landcare Research. 2023. Archived from the original on 24 February 2025.
- "Hedycarya J.R.Forst. & G.Forst". Plants of the World Online. Archived from the original on 11 September 2024 – via Royal Botanic Gardens, Kew.
