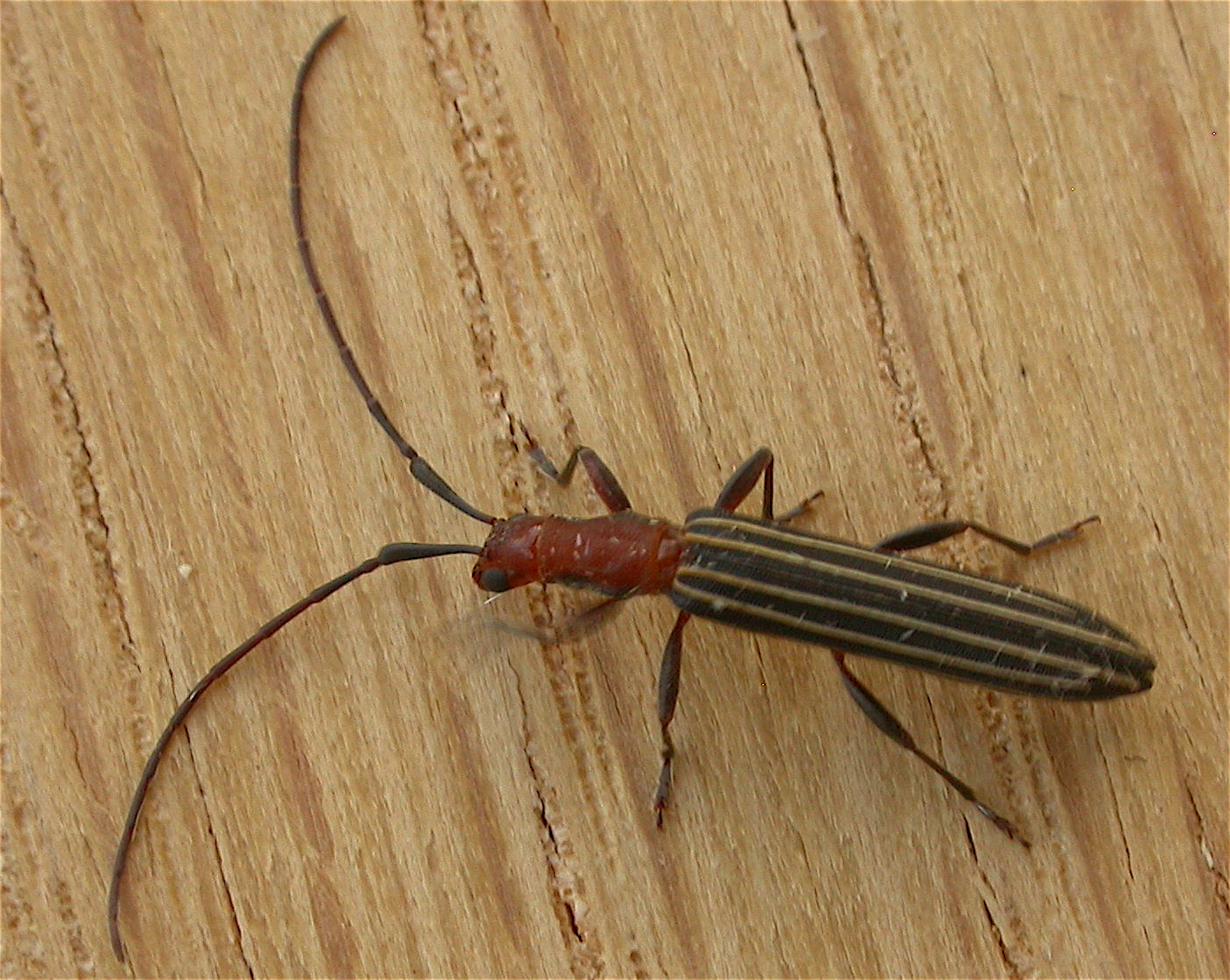
- Syllitus rectus

Scientific classification
- Kingdom: Animalia
- Phylum: Arthropoda
- Class: Insecta
- Order: Coleoptera
- Suborder: Polyphaga
- Infraorder: Cucujiformia
- Family: Cerambycidae
- Subfamily: Cerambycinae
- Tribe: Stenoderini
- Genus: Syllitus; Pascoe, 1859

= Syllitus =

Genus of beetles

Syllitus is a genus of long-horned beetles in the family Cerambycidae. There are more than 40 described species in Syllitus.

== Species ==
These 47 species belong to the genus Syllitus:

- Syllitus acanthias McKeown, 1937
- Syllitus adonarensis Jordan, 1894
- Syllitus albipennis Pascoe, 1869
- Syllitus araucariae McKeown, 1938
- Syllitus argillaceus McKeown, 1937
- Syllitus bellulus McKeown, 1942
- Syllitus beltrani Cerda, 1968
- Syllitus bicolor (Schwarzer, 1924)
- Syllitus bipunctatus Waterhouse, 1877
- Syllitus brimblecombei McKeown, 1938
- Syllitus buloloensis Gressitt, 1959
- Syllitus cassiniae McKeown, 1938
- Syllitus centocrus McKeown, 1938
- Syllitus cylindricus Germain, 1899
- Syllitus deustus (Newman, 1841)
- Syllitus divergens McKeown, 1937
- Syllitus dubius McKeown, 1938
- Syllitus elguetai Cerda, 1991
- Syllitus froggatti McKeown, 1937
- Syllitus fulvipennis Gahan, 1893
- Syllitus grammicus (Newman, 1840)
- Syllitus heros Blackburn, 1900
- Syllitus insularis Gressitt, 1959
- Syllitus leoensis Gilmour, 1961
- Syllitus microps Blackburn, 1900
- Syllitus minor Gressitt, 1959
- Syllitus minutus McKeown, 1937
- Syllitus niger Gressitt, 1959
- Syllitus papuanus Gestro, 1875
- Syllitus parryi Pascoe, 1862
- Syllitus pseudocupes (Fairmaire & Germain, 1864)
- Syllitus rectus (Newman, 1841)
- Syllitus schajovskoii Bosq, 1953
- Syllitus sexlineatus Gressitt, 1951
- Syllitus sinuaticosta McKeown, 1938
- Syllitus sinuatus McKeown, 1937
- Syllitus spinosus Gahan, 1915
- Syllitus stellamontis Gressitt, 1959
- Syllitus sumbae Franz, 1972
- Syllitus sutteri Franz, 1972
- Syllitus tabidus Pascoe, 1871
- Syllitus terminatus Pascoe, 1871
- Syllitus timorensis Gilmour, 1961
- Syllitus tuberculatus McKeown, 1938
- Syllitus undulatus Heller, 1914
- Syllitus uniformis Blackburn, 1893
- Syllitus unistriatus McKeown, 1942
