= Syllitus bicolor =

Scientific classification
- Kingdom: Animalia
- Phylum: Arthropoda
- Clade: Pancrustacea
- Class: Insecta
- Order: Coleoptera
- Suborder: Polyphaga
- Infraorder: Cucujiformia
- Family: Cerambycidae
- Genus: Syllitus
- Species: S. bicolor

Binomial name
- Syllitus bicolor (Schwarzer, 1924)

Species of beetle

Syllitus bicolor is a species of beetle in the family Cerambycidae. It was described by Schwarzer in 1924.
