= Syllitus terminatus =

Scientific classification
- Kingdom: Animalia
- Phylum: Arthropoda
- Clade: Pancrustacea
- Class: Insecta
- Order: Coleoptera
- Suborder: Polyphaga
- Infraorder: Cucujiformia
- Family: Cerambycidae
- Genus: Syllitus
- Species: S. terminatus

Binomial name
- Syllitus terminatus Pascoe, 1871

Species of beetle

Syllitus terminatus is a species of beetle in the family Cerambycidae. It was described by Pascoe in 1871.
