= Syllitus stellamontis =

Scientific classification
- Kingdom: Animalia
- Phylum: Arthropoda
- Clade: Pancrustacea
- Class: Insecta
- Order: Coleoptera
- Suborder: Polyphaga
- Infraorder: Cucujiformia
- Family: Cerambycidae
- Genus: Syllitus
- Species: S. stellamontis

Binomial name
- Syllitus stellamontis Gressitt, 1959

Species of beetle

Syllitus stellamontis is a species of beetle in the family Cerambycidae. It was described by Gressitt in 1959.
