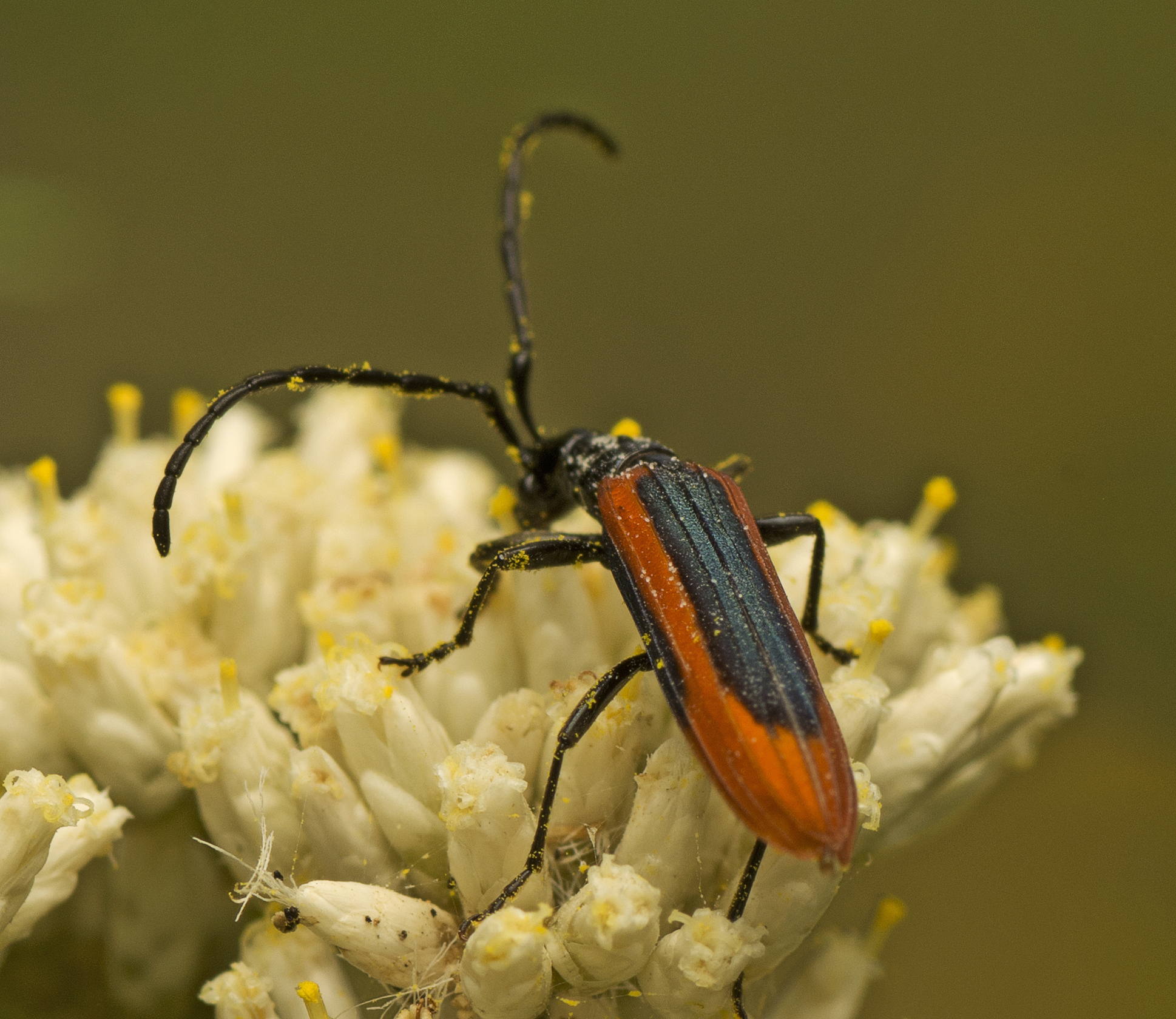

Scientific classification
- Kingdom: Animalia
- Phylum: Arthropoda
- Clade: Pancrustacea
- Class: Insecta
- Order: Coleoptera
- Suborder: Polyphaga
- Infraorder: Cucujiformia
- Family: Cerambycidae
- Genus: Stenoderus
- Species: S. suturalis

Binomial name
- Stenoderus suturalis (Oliver, 1795)

= Stenoderus suturalis =

Species of longhorn beetle

Stenoderus suturalis, commonly known as the stinking longicorn, is a species of longhorn beetle found in southern parts of Australia, including Western Australia. Growing to about 20 mm, the legs, head and thorax are glossy black. The elytra is a coloured orange.

When threatened, the stinking longicorn will release a stinking fluid from glands near the eyes, located laterally near the mandibular articulations.
