= Syllitus microps =

Scientific classification
- Kingdom: Animalia
- Phylum: Arthropoda
- Clade: Pancrustacea
- Class: Insecta
- Order: Coleoptera
- Suborder: Polyphaga
- Infraorder: Cucujiformia
- Family: Cerambycidae
- Genus: Syllitus
- Species: S. microps

Binomial name
- Syllitus microps Blackburn, 1900

Species of beetle

Syllitus microps is a species of beetle in the family Cerambycidae. It was described by Blackburn in 1900.
