= Stenoderus =

Scientific classification
- Kingdom: Animalia
- Phylum: Arthropoda
- Clade: Pancrustacea
- Class: Insecta
- Order: Coleoptera
- Suborder: Polyphaga
- Infraorder: Cucujiformia
- Family: Cerambycidae
- Genus: Stenoderus; Dejean, 1821

Genus of beetles

Stenoderus is a genus of longhorn beetles in the family Cerambycidae.

Stenoderus contains the following species:

- Stenoderus ostricilla
- Stenoderus quietus
- Stenoderus concolor
- Stenoderus opacicollis
- Stenoderus suturalis
