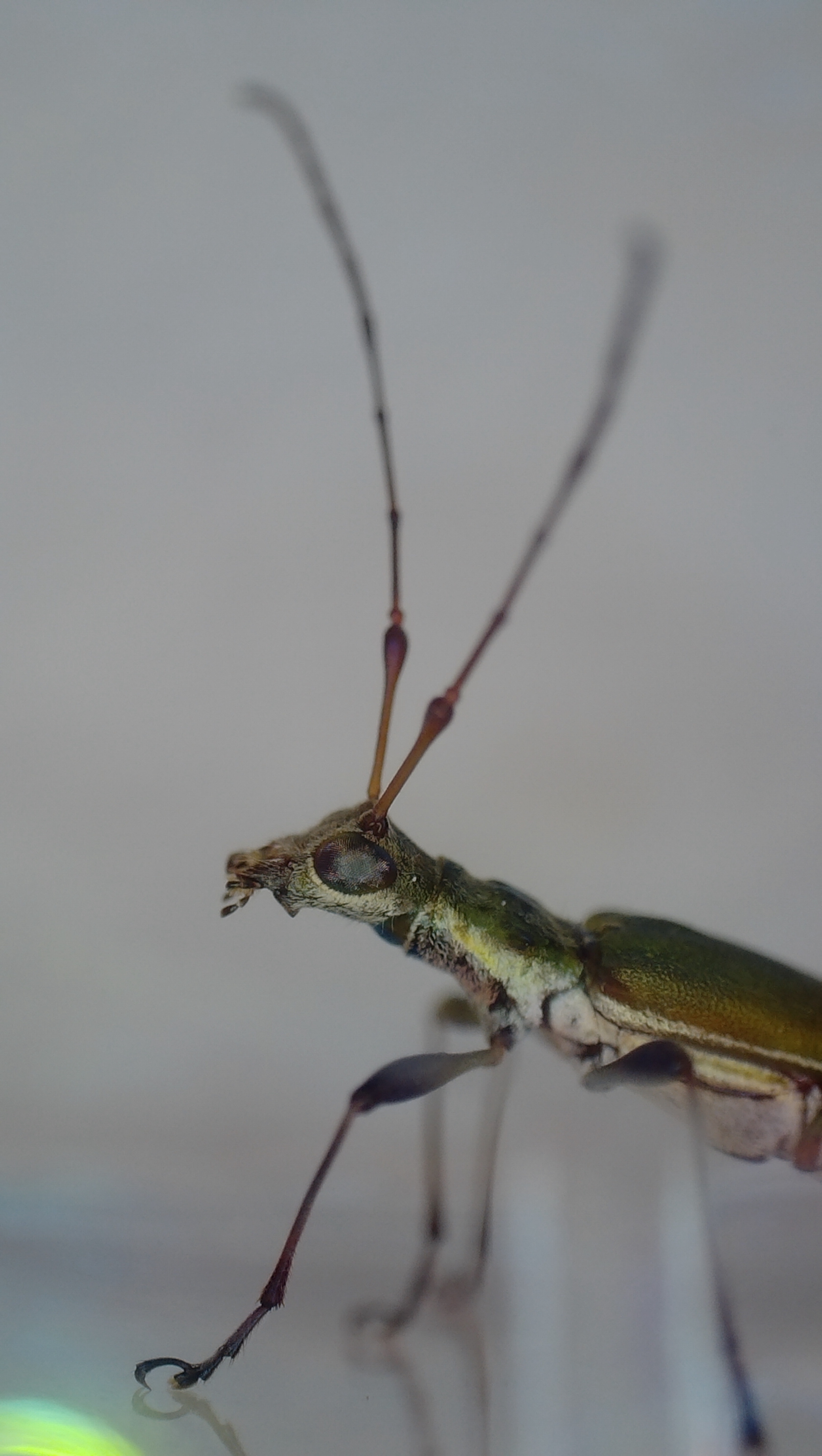

Scientific classification
- Kingdom: Animalia
- Phylum: Arthropoda
- Class: Insecta
- Order: Coleoptera
- Suborder: Polyphaga
- Infraorder: Cucujiformia
- Family: Cerambycidae
- Genus: Calliprason
- Species: C. sinclairi

Binomial name
- Calliprason sinclairi White, 1843

Synonyms
- Stenoderus sinclairi

= Calliprason sinclairi =

Species of beetle

Calliprason sinclairi, Sinclair's longhorn, is a longhorn beetle species in the genus Calliprason. It is endemic to New Zealand. Sinclair's longhorn was named for Dr. Andrew Sinclair who found the insect in New Zealand, and presented it, with many other New Zealand insects, to the British Museum.

== Description ==
Sinclair's longhorn is a small beetle, with distinctive green iridescent elytra. Males measure 8.5–10.4 mm, and females measure 9.7–12.9 mm.

== Distribution and habitat ==
Calliprason sinclairi is widely distributed throughout the North Island, and has been documented in Northland, Auckland, Coromandel, Bay of Plenty, Taupō and Wellington. It is also found in the northern part of the South Island, specifically Nelson, Marlborough Sounds, and Mid Canterbury. The grubs burrow into dead and decaying wood, especially branches of pigeonwood (Hedycarya arborea) and miro (Pectinopitys ferruginea). They are common around forests from December, January, and into February.
