= Syllitus elguetai =

Scientific classification
- Kingdom: Animalia
- Phylum: Arthropoda
- Clade: Pancrustacea
- Class: Insecta
- Order: Coleoptera
- Suborder: Polyphaga
- Infraorder: Cucujiformia
- Family: Cerambycidae
- Genus: Syllitus
- Species: S. elguetai

Binomial name
- Syllitus elguetai Cerda, 1991

Species of beetle

Syllitus elguetai is a species of beetle in the family Cerambycidae. It was described by Cerda in 1991.
