= Syllitus bellulus =

Scientific classification
- Kingdom: Animalia
- Phylum: Arthropoda
- Clade: Pancrustacea
- Class: Insecta
- Order: Coleoptera
- Suborder: Polyphaga
- Infraorder: Cucujiformia
- Family: Cerambycidae
- Genus: Syllitus
- Species: S. bellulus

Binomial name
- Syllitus bellulus McKeown, 1942

Species of beetle

Syllitus bellulus is a species of beetle in the family Cerambycidae. It was described by McKeown in 1942.
