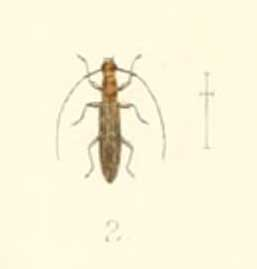

Scientific classification
- Kingdom: Animalia
- Phylum: Arthropoda
- Clade: Pancrustacea
- Class: Insecta
- Order: Coleoptera
- Suborder: Polyphaga
- Infraorder: Cucujiformia
- Family: Cerambycidae
- Genus: Syllitus
- Species: S. adonarensis

Binomial name
- Syllitus adonarensis Jordan, 1894

= Syllitus adonarensis =

Species of beetle

Syllitus adonarensis is a species of beetle in the family Cerambycidae. It was described by Jordan in 1894.
