= Syllitus cylindricus =

Scientific classification
- Kingdom: Animalia
- Phylum: Arthropoda
- Clade: Pancrustacea
- Class: Insecta
- Order: Coleoptera
- Suborder: Polyphaga
- Infraorder: Cucujiformia
- Family: Cerambycidae
- Genus: Syllitus
- Species: S. cylindricus

Binomial name
- Syllitus cylindricus Germain, 1899

Species of beetle

Syllitus cylindricus is a species of beetle in the family Cerambycidae. It was described by Germain in 1899.
