= Syllitus schajovskoii =

Scientific classification
- Kingdom: Animalia
- Phylum: Arthropoda
- Clade: Pancrustacea
- Class: Insecta
- Order: Coleoptera
- Suborder: Polyphaga
- Infraorder: Cucujiformia
- Family: Cerambycidae
- Genus: Syllitus
- Species: S. schajovskoii

Binomial name
- Syllitus schajovskoii Bosq, 1953

Synonyms
- Syllitus chilensis Cerda, 1953

Species of beetle

Syllitus schajovskoii is a species of beetle in the family Cerambycidae. It was described by Bosq in 1953.
