= Syllitus divergens =

Scientific classification
- Kingdom: Animalia
- Phylum: Arthropoda
- Clade: Pancrustacea
- Class: Insecta
- Order: Coleoptera
- Suborder: Polyphaga
- Infraorder: Cucujiformia
- Family: Cerambycidae
- Genus: Syllitus
- Species: S. divergens

Binomial name
- Syllitus divergens McKeown, 1937

Species of beetle

Syllitus divergens is a species of beetle in the family Cerambycidae. It was described by McKeown in 1937.
