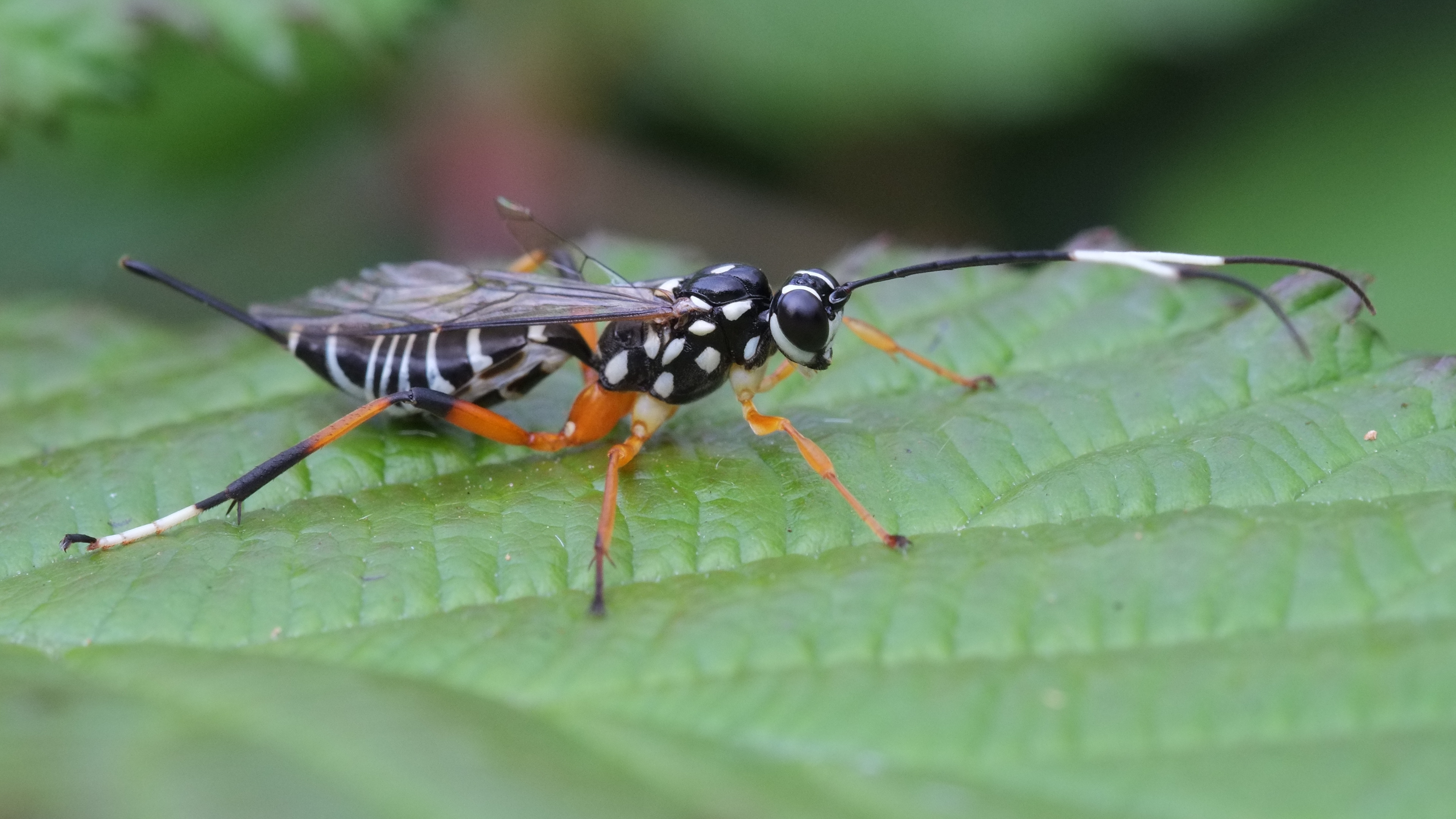
- Lemon tree borer parasite on blackberry leaf

Scientific classification
- Kingdom: Animalia
- Phylum: Arthropoda
- Class: Insecta
- Order: Hymenoptera
- Family: Ichneumonidae
- Genus: Xanthocryptus
- Species: X. novozealandicus

Binomial name
- Xanthocryptus novozealandicus (Dalla Torre, 1902)

= Xanthocryptus novozealandicus =

Species of wasp

Xanthocryptus novozealandicus, the lemon tree borer parasite, is a wasp in the family Ichneumonidae. It is a native insect of New Zealand. It is also found in Australia and New Guinea. Females hunt for larvae of wood-boring beetles around March, including the lemon tree borer (Oemona hirta), a native cerambycid that tunnels into citrus trees, grapes and many native species. When a suitable host is found, the female pushes her ovipositor through the wood and injects her eggs into the grub. This has the incidental benefit of helping to control some pests. X. novozealandicus prefers to prey on second year lemon tree borer larvae. This specific parasite prefers to prey on larger second year larvae due to its larger size.

== Description ==
The female X. novozealandicus is larger than the male of the species, with the female reaching between 9 and 15mm long, while the males are between 5 and 11mm long. They exhibit primarily black coloration with white spots covering their thorax and white stripes along their abdomen and head. Their front legs tend to be short and their back four legs much longer with primarily reddish-brown coloration and black tips. The back two legs have a single set of white bands each. They display very long black antennae with a single distinct band of white near the tip, although the tip itself is also black. The wasp uses the white part of the antenna to palpate damaged wood and identify a suitable host. The beetle Drototelus elegans, attacked by X. novozealandicus, mimics the wasp's coloration, thought to be an example of aposematism helping to protect them from birds. The beetle has been known to mimic its parasitoid through both coloration and flight pattern.

Xanthocryptus novozealandicus
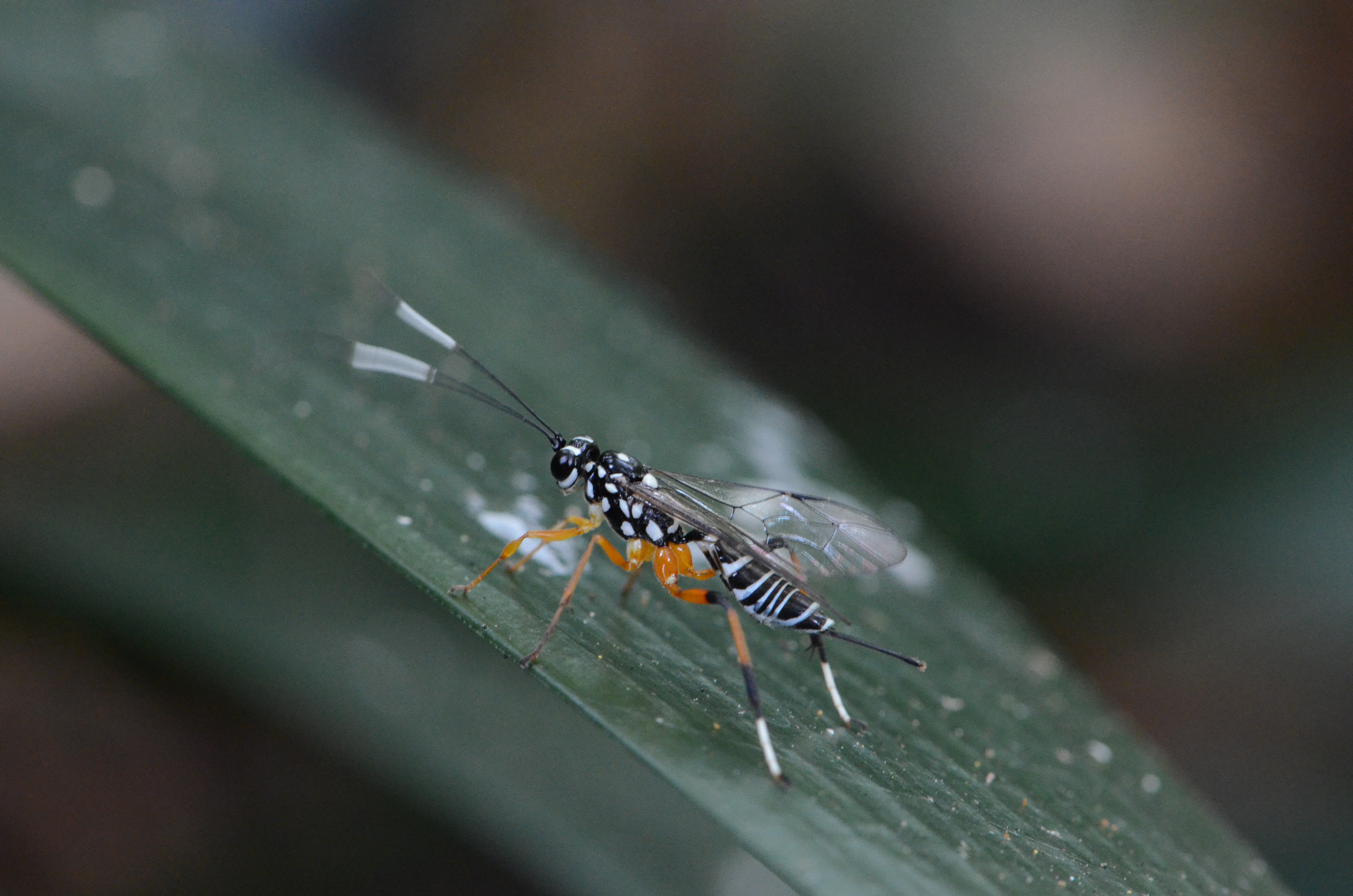
Xanthocryptus novozealandicus.

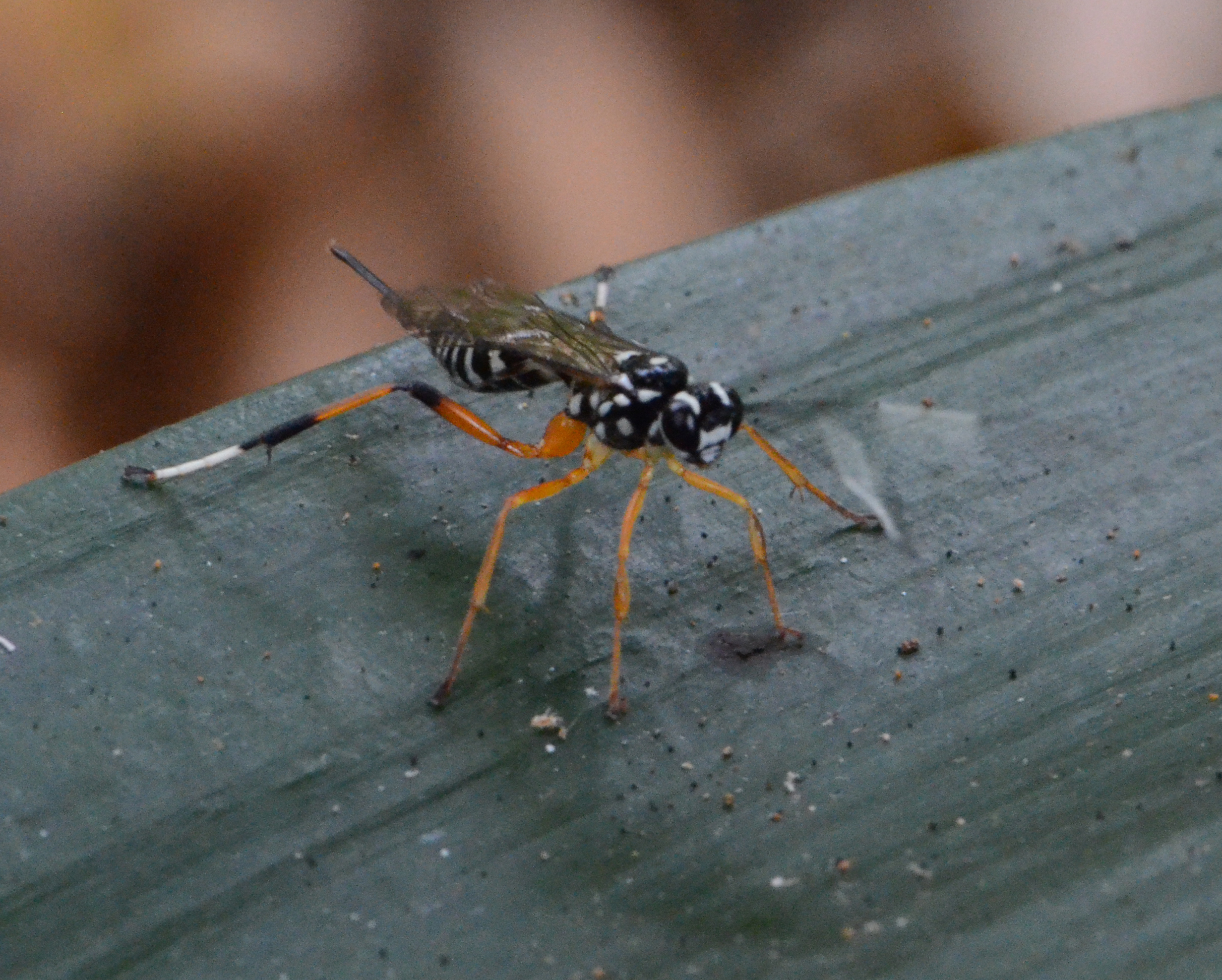
Xanthocryptus novozealandicus in Titirangi Auckland.

== Life cycle and phenology ==
The life cycle of X. novozealandicus consists of four distinct stages: egg, larvae, pupae/cocoon, and adult. It is not currently known how long it takes for the wasp to fully develop. The Lemon Tree Borer Parasite relies on the bodies of beetle larva to house their offspring. During March, the female of X. novozealandicus searches for hosts to lay their eggs. They are able to visually identify damage to tree bark done specifically by wood boring beetles. The wasp receives its name from its common host, the Lemon Tree Borer. Researchers theorize that their long antennae allows them to sense the beetle larvae through the bark, even if they are deep in the wood. The females utilise a specialized tube-like spike called an ovipositor to penetrate the bodies of their victims. The ovipositor is sharp enough to penetrate not only the grub's body but the wood of the tree as well. Once inserted the parasite quickly deposits its eggs into its victim. As the X. novozealandicus larvae develop they are purposely selective with their feeding to not kill their host.

== Geographic distribution and habitat ==
Natural global range

Xanthocryptus novozealandicus is native to New Zealand, New Guinea and Australia.

New Zealand range

The species can be found across both the North and South Island as well as Three Kings Islands. On the North Island populations can be found in Northland, Auckland, The Bay of Plenty, Manawatū-Whanganui, Waikato, Hawke's Bay, and Wellington. For the South Island they can be seen in Tasman, Nelson, the West Coast, as well as parts of Canterbury and Otago. They have been seen occupying natural forests within New Zealand as well as in small clearings.

Habitat

Not much research exists into the habitat preferences of X. novozealandicus specifically, but the Ichneumonidae family it belongs to have been observed to exist in most terrestrial environments as long as their host species is present.

== Diet, prey and predators ==
Diet and parasitism

Wood boring beetles are their main food source from their larvae stage till they are fully grown Not much research exists into the diet of X. novozealandicus after emerging from its host, but adult parasitic wasps in general tend to feed upon nectar, pollen, and honeydew. X. novozealandicus, like all Ichneumon wasps are extremely beneficial to agriculture since they parasitize mostly pest species. These are some of few species of parasites that benefit humans through their parasitism. The Lemon Tree Borer, Oemona hirta, is a common agricultural pest that damages grape vines in vineyards and citrus trees. Thus it serves a vital horticultural purpose and is responsible for keeping the Lemon Tree Borer populations contained. In Auckland alone nearly 10–20% of the Lemon Tree Borer's have been found to host the wasp's larvae.

Predators

Little is known about specific predators that hunt X. novozealandicus but like most wasps they must contend with avian predation.

Disease

There are currently no known diseases for X. novozealandicus.

== Other ==
Xanthocryptus novozealandicus has two other similar competitors which have been spotted in the same regions of New Zealand, the Campoplex sp. and Apsicolpus hudsoni. It was thought that these three parasitic wasps would compete for the same hosts but Campoplex sp. and Apsicolpus hudsoni prefer smaller larvae. The other two wasps have longer ovipositors which allows them to reach hosts deeper in the bark than X. novozealandicus.

It has been found that the female will lay a female egg into a larger host and a male egg into a smaller host. This is most likely due to the fact that the female is larger and will demand more nutrients than the male.
