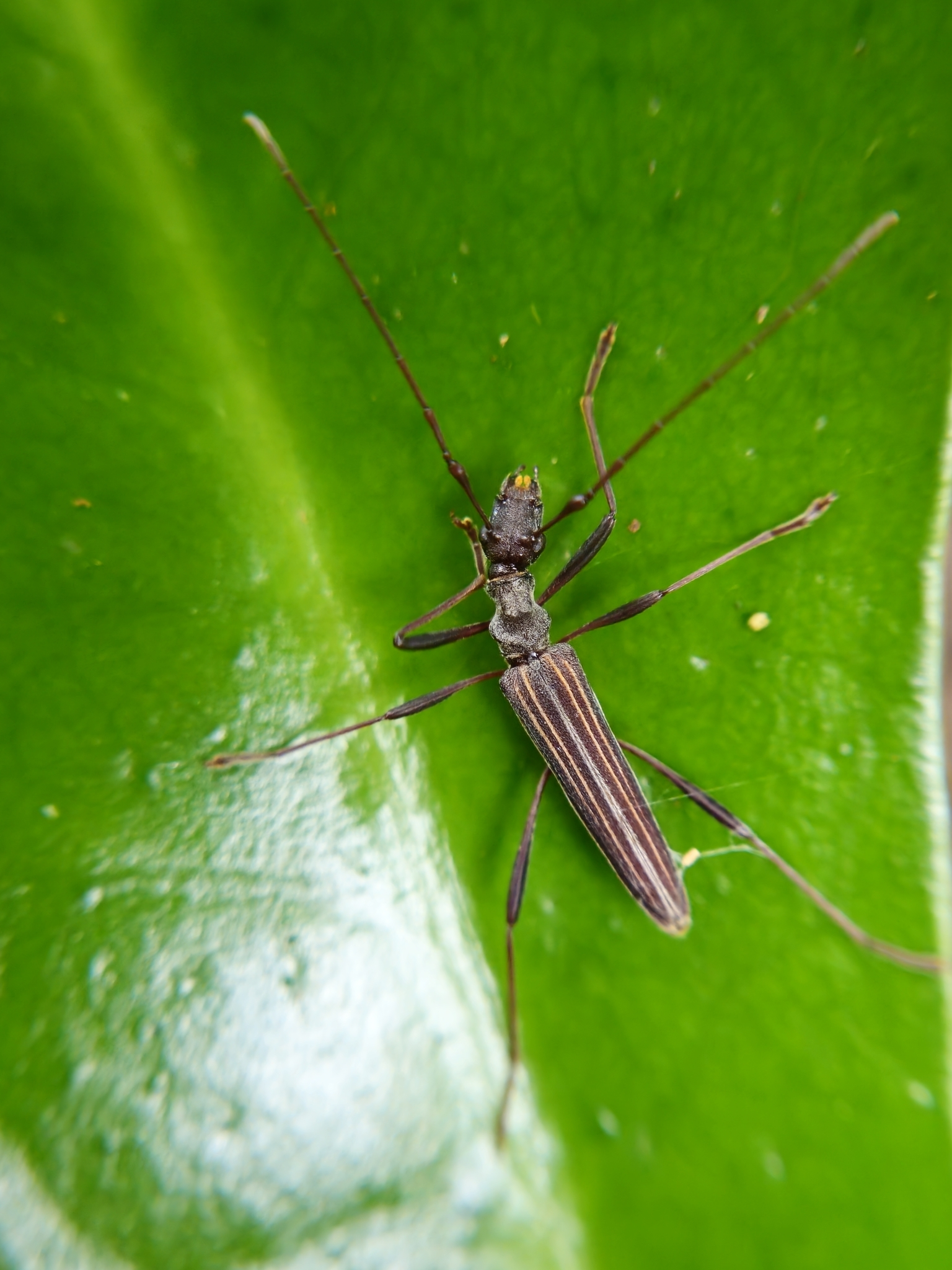

Scientific classification
- Kingdom: Animalia
- Phylum: Arthropoda
- Class: Insecta
- Order: Coleoptera
- Suborder: Polyphaga
- Infraorder: Cucujiformia
- Family: Cerambycidae
- Genus: Calliprason
- Species: C. elegans

Binomial name
- Calliprason elegans (Sharp, 1877)

Synonyms
- Drotus elegans

= Calliprason elegans =

Species of beetle

Calliprason elegans is a longhorn beetle species in the genus Calliprason.

The type locality is near Tairua, New Zealand.
