= Syllitus grammicus =

Scientific classification
- Kingdom: Animalia
- Phylum: Arthropoda
- Clade: Pancrustacea
- Class: Insecta
- Order: Coleoptera
- Suborder: Polyphaga
- Infraorder: Cucujiformia
- Family: Cerambycidae
- Genus: Syllitus
- Species: S. grammicus

Binomial name
- Syllitus grammicus (Newman, 1840)

Species of beetle

Syllitus grammicus is a species of beetle in the family Cerambycidae. It was described by Newman in 1840.
