= Syllitus argillaceus =

Scientific classification
- Kingdom: Animalia
- Phylum: Arthropoda
- Clade: Pancrustacea
- Class: Insecta
- Order: Coleoptera
- Suborder: Polyphaga
- Infraorder: Cucujiformia
- Family: Cerambycidae
- Genus: Syllitus
- Species: S. argillaceus

Binomial name
- Syllitus argillaceus McKeown, 1937

Species of beetle

Syllitus argillaceus is a species of beetle in the family Cerambycidae. It was described by Keith Collingwood McKeown in 1937. It is endemic to New South Wales, Australia.

Syllitus argillaceus measure 12 mm (0.47 in) in length.
