= Rectus muscle =

Rectus muscle (Latin: mūsculus rēctus, "straight muscle") may refer to:

In the trunk:

- Rectus abdominis muscle

In the eye:

- Inferior rectus muscle
- Lateral rectus muscle
- Medial rectus muscle
- Superior rectus muscle

In the leg:

- Rectus femoris muscle

In the neck:

- Rectus capitis anterior muscle
- Rectus capitis lateralis muscle
- Rectus capitis posterior major muscle
- Rectus capitis posterior minor
