= Syllitus pseudocupes =

Scientific classification
- Kingdom: Animalia
- Phylum: Arthropoda
- Clade: Pancrustacea
- Class: Insecta
- Order: Coleoptera
- Suborder: Polyphaga
- Infraorder: Cucujiformia
- Family: Cerambycidae
- Genus: Syllitus
- Species: S. pseudocupes

Binomial name
- Syllitus pseudocupes (Fairmaire & Germain, 1864)

Species of beetle

Syllitus pseudocupes is a species of beetle in the family Cerambycidae. It was described by Fairmaire and Germain in 1864.
