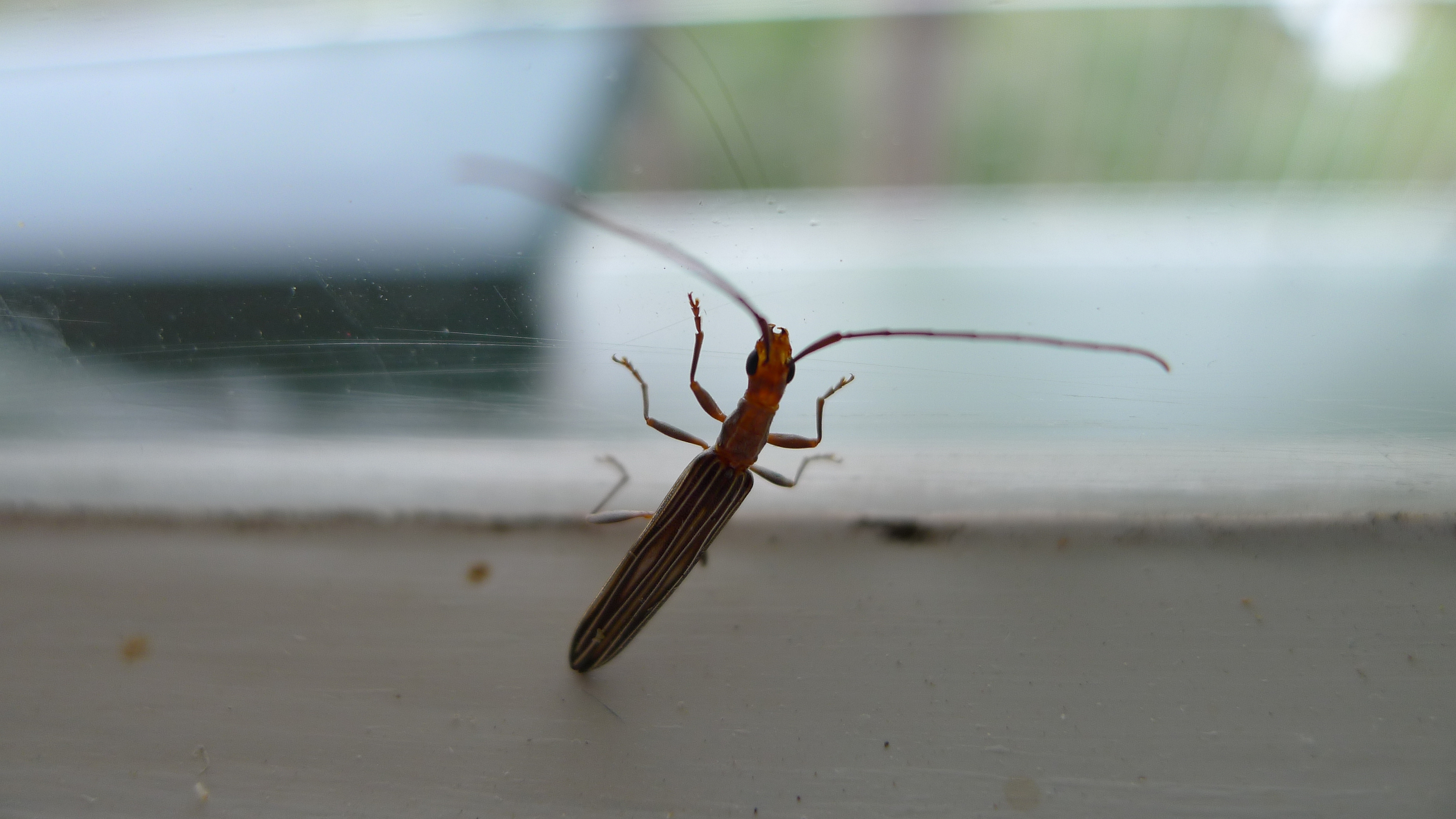
- Syllitus bipunctatus

Scientific classification
- Kingdom: Animalia
- Phylum: Arthropoda
- Clade: Pancrustacea
- Class: Insecta
- Order: Coleoptera
- Suborder: Polyphaga
- Infraorder: Cucujiformia
- Family: Cerambycidae
- Genus: Syllitus
- Species: S. bipunctatus

Binomial name
- Syllitus bipunctatus Waterhouse, 1877

= Syllitus bipunctatus =

Species of beetle

Syllitus bipunctatus is a species of beetle in the family Cerambycidae. It was described by Waterhouse in 1877.
