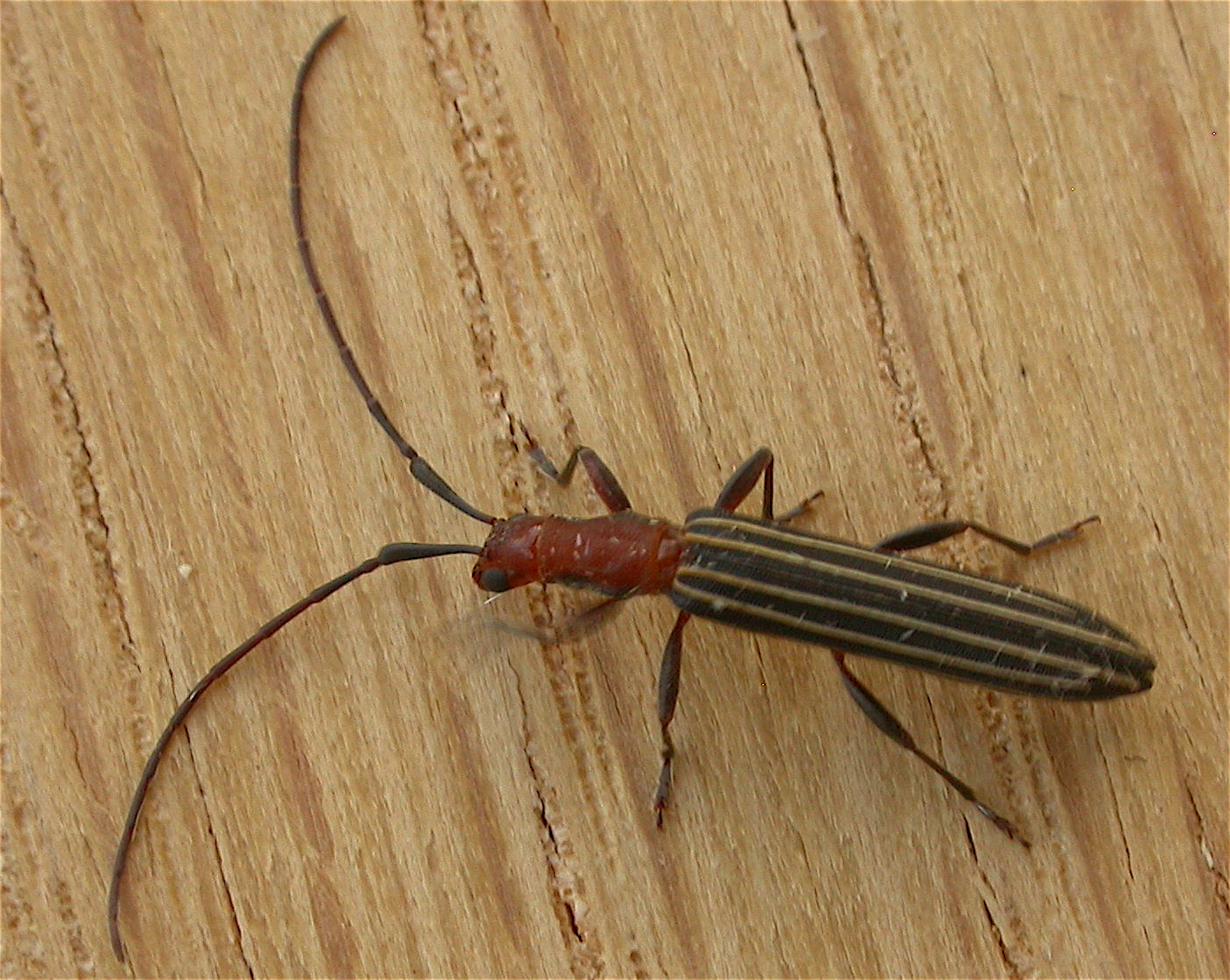

Scientific classification
- Kingdom: Animalia
- Phylum: Arthropoda
- Clade: Pancrustacea
- Class: Insecta
- Order: Coleoptera
- Suborder: Polyphaga
- Infraorder: Cucujiformia
- Family: Cerambycidae
- Genus: Syllitus
- Species: S. rectus

Binomial name
- Syllitus rectus (Newman, 1841)

= Syllitus rectus =

Species of beetle

Syllitus rectus is a species of Cerambycidae that occurs in Australia.
