= Kibara =

Kibara may refer to:

- Kibara (plant), a genus of plants in the family Monimiaceae
- Kibara coriacea, a species of plant in the family Monimiaceae
- Kibara Mountains, a range in the Katanga Province of the Democratic Republic of the Congo
- Kibaran orogeny, a series of orogenic events in what is now Africa
