= Mollinedia marquetiana =

Conservation status
- Vulnerable (IUCN 2.3)

Scientific classification
- Kingdom: Plantae
- Clade: Tracheophytes
- Clade: Angiosperms
- Clade: Magnoliids
- Order: Laurales
- Family: Monimiaceae
- Genus: Mollinedia
- Species: M. marquetiana

Binomial name
- Mollinedia marquetiana Peixoto

Species of flowering plant

Mollinedia marquetiana is a species of plant in the Monimiaceae family. It is endemic to Brazil. It is threatened by habitat loss.
