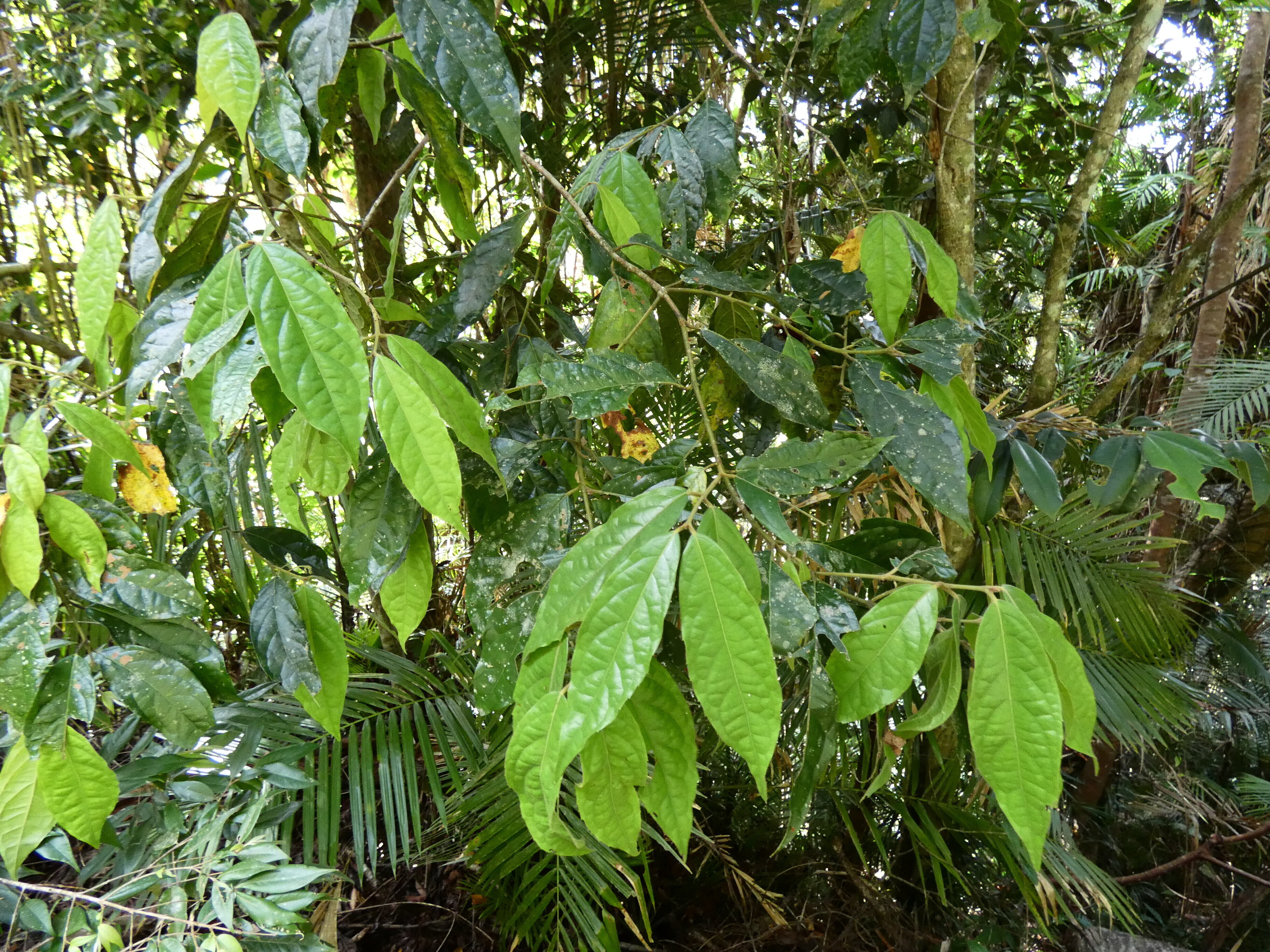
- In rainforest near Cairns, Queensland

Conservation status
- Least Concern (IUCN 3.1)

Scientific classification
- Kingdom: Plantae
- Clade: Embryophytes
- Clade: Tracheophytes
- Clade: Spermatophytes
- Clade: Angiosperms
- Clade: Magnoliids
- Order: Laurales
- Family: Monimiaceae
- Genus: Steganthera
- Species: S. laxiflora

Binomial name
- Steganthera laxiflora (Benth.) Whiffin & Foreman

Synonyms
- Kibara laxiflora Benth.; Mollinedia laxiflora (Benth.) F.Muell.; Tetrasynandra laxiflora (Benth.) Perkins

= Steganthera laxiflora =

Species of flowering plant

Steganthera laxiflora, commonly known as tetra beech, is a species of plant in the family Monimiaceae. It is native to eastern tropical Queensland, Australia.

== Description ==
Steganthera laxiflora is a tree that can grow up to 20 m (66 ft) tall. Leaves are arranged in opposite pairs on the twigs and are finely hairy on both sides. They measure up to 20 cm (7.9 in) long and 8 cm (3.1 in) wide, and are generally elliptic to oblong-elliptic.

This species is monoecious, meaning that flowers are either male or female, and both types are present on each plant. Male inflorescences grow up to 9 cm (3.5 in) long with between 5 and 60 globular flowers, each about 3 mm (0.12 in) wide; female inflorescences are similar.

The fruit is a black ellipsoid drupe up to 18 mm (0.7 in) long and 13 mm (0.5 in) wide containing a single seed.

== Taxonomy ==
The species was first described by George Bentham as Kibara laxiflora. It was transferred to its current name in Flora of Australia in 2007.

Two subspecies are recognised, Steganthera laxiflora subsp. lewisensis and the autonym Steganthera laxiflora subsp. laxiflora.

== Conservation ==
As of June 2026, this species has been assessed to be of least concern by the International Union for Conservation of Nature (IUCN) and by the Queensland Government under its Nature Conservation Act.

== Ecology ==
The fruit are eaten by fruit doves, including the wompoo fruit dove and superb fruit dove, and by cassowaries.

== Gallery ==
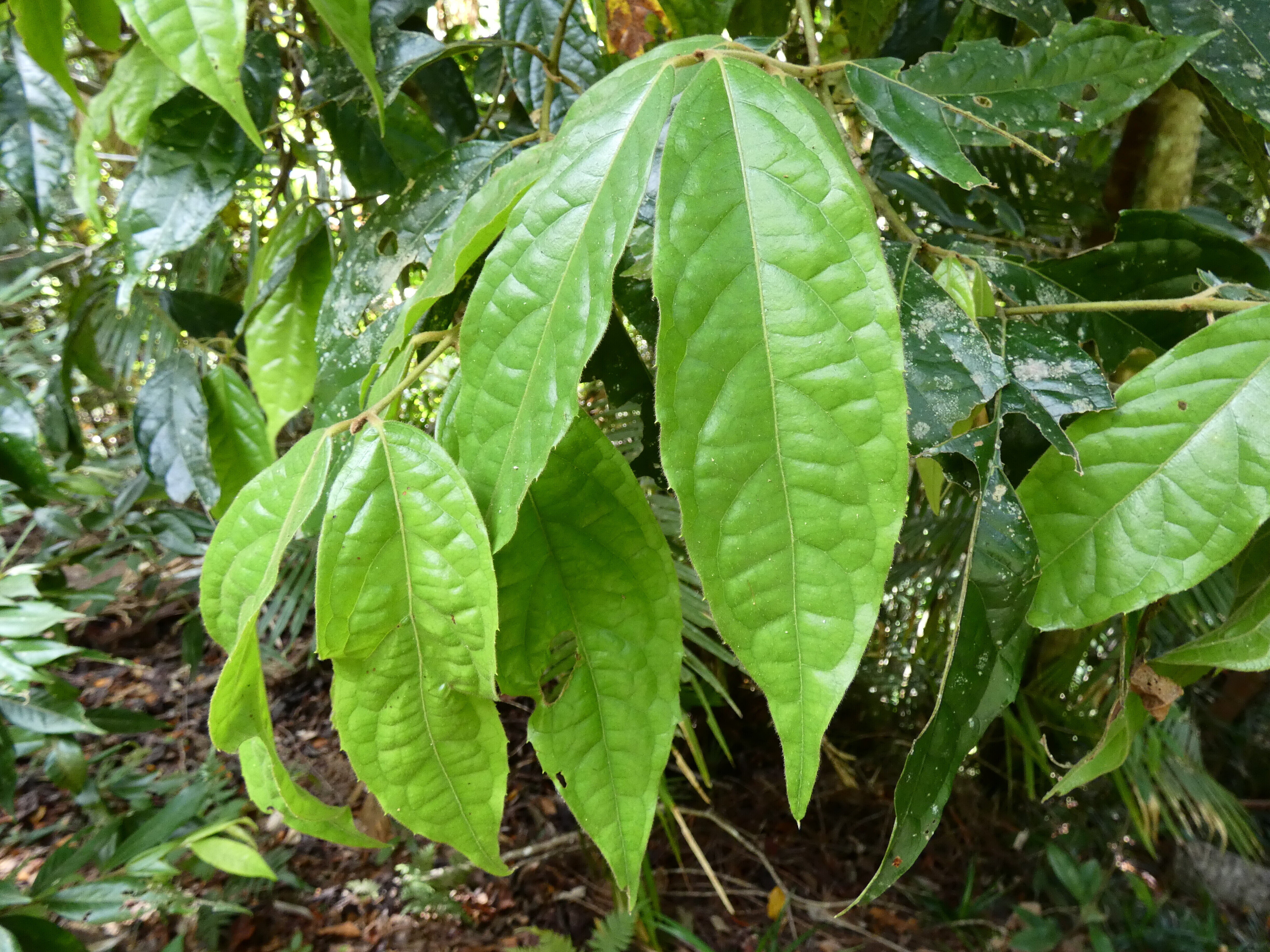
Leaves

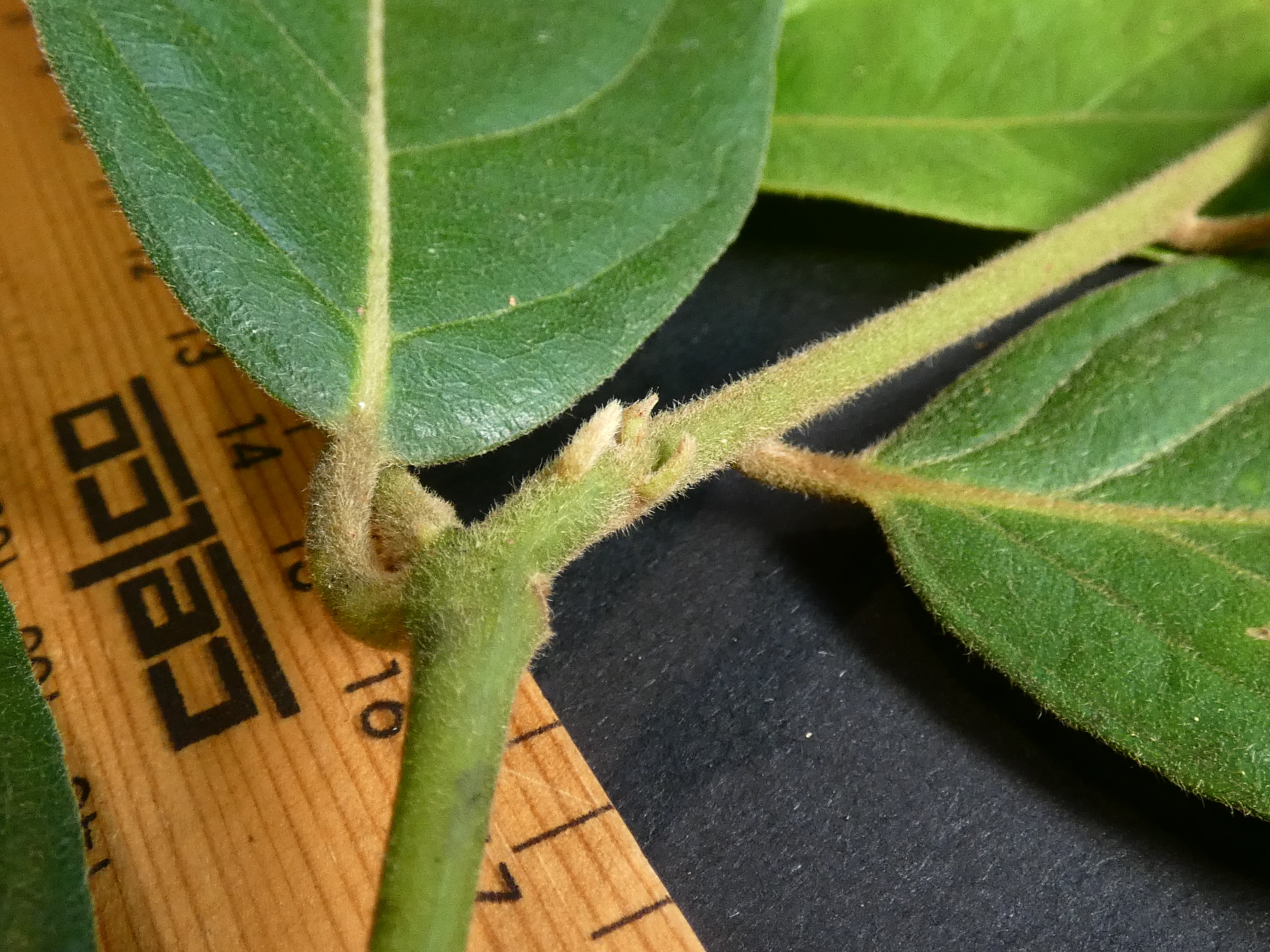
Hairy stem

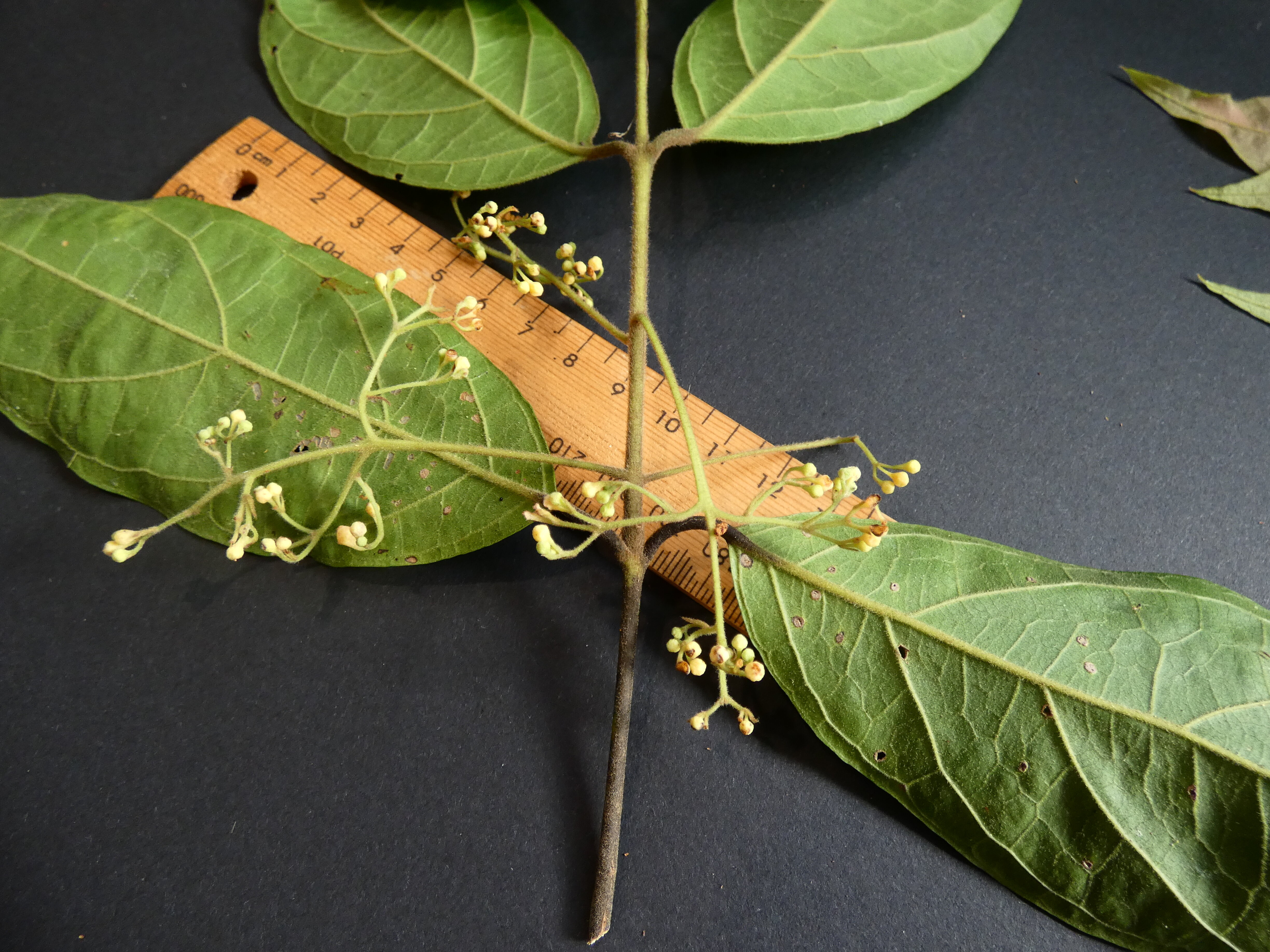
Inflorescences

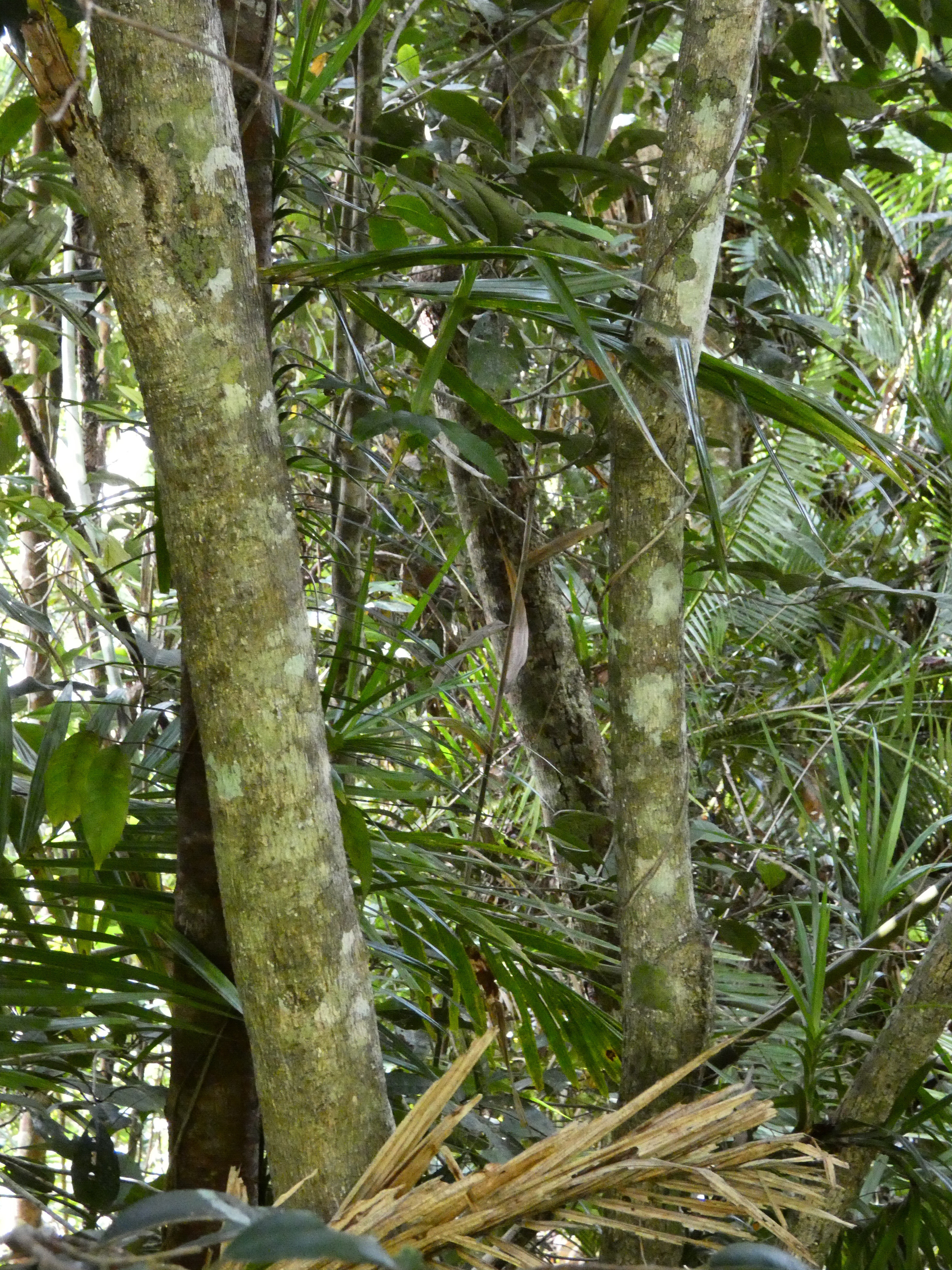
Trunk
