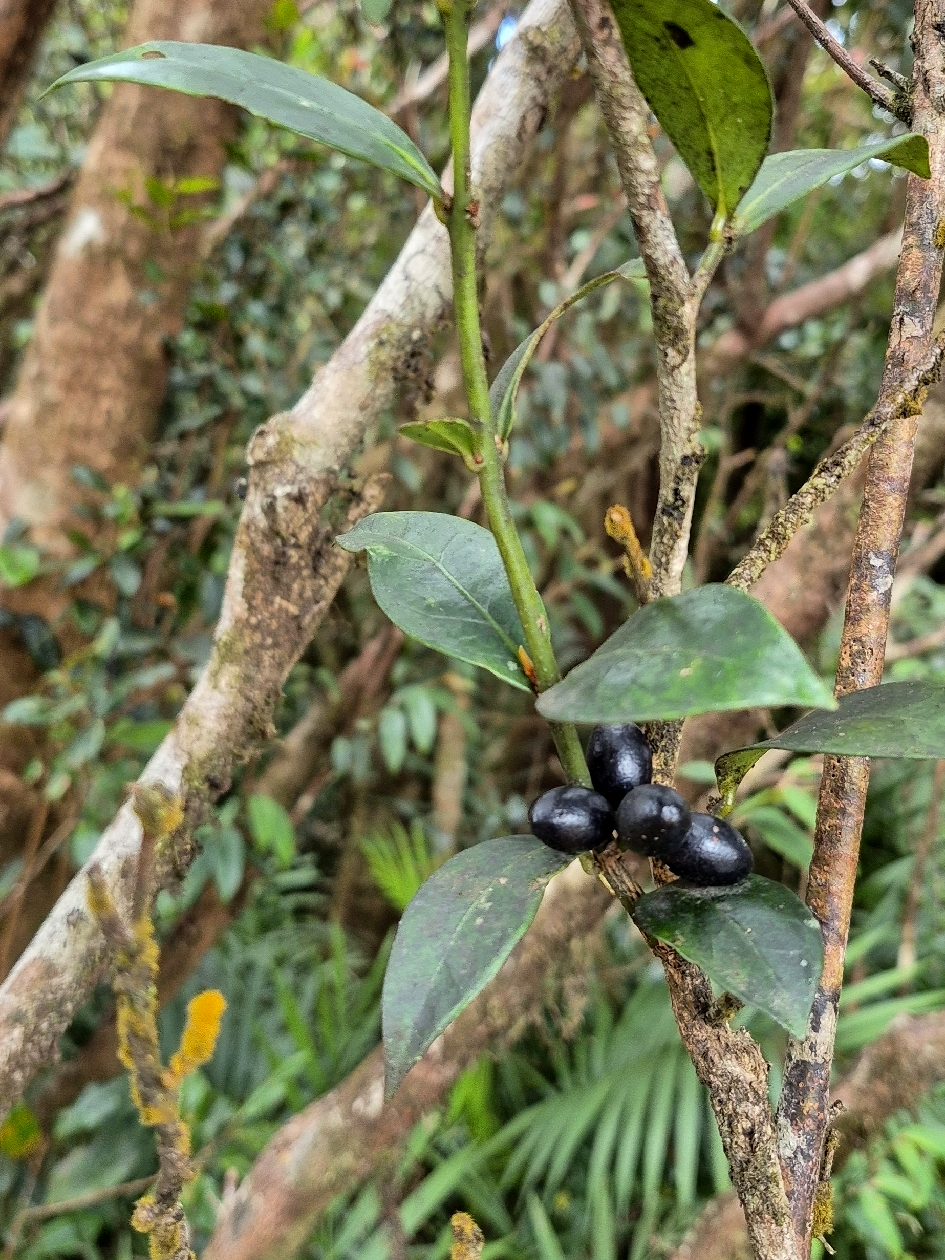
- On Mount Bellenden Ker

Conservation status
- Least Concern (IUCN 3.1)
- Least Concern (NCA)

Scientific classification
- Kingdom: Plantae
- Clade: Embryophytes
- Clade: Tracheophytes
- Clade: Spermatophytes
- Clade: Angiosperms
- Clade: Magnoliids
- Order: Laurales
- Family: Monimiaceae
- Genus: Steganthera
- Species: S. macooraia

Binomial name
- Steganthera macooraia (F.M.Bailey) P.K.Endress

Synonyms
- Mollinedia macooraia F.M.Bailey; Wilkiea macooraia (F.M.Bailey) Perkins

= Steganthera macooraia =

Species of flowering plant

Steganthera macooraia, commonly known as beech sassafras, is a species of plant in the family Monimiaceae. It is native to the Wet Tropics bioregion of Queensland, Australia.

== Description ==
Steganthera macooraia is a small tree growing to about 12 m (39 ft) tall. The leaves are simple (without divisions or lobes) and arranged in opposite pairs on the twigs. Male and female flowers appear on separate inflorescences. Both male and female flowers are about 3 mm (0.12 in) diameter. The fruit is a dark red to black ellipsoid drupe containing a single seed.

== Distribution and habitat ==
The species grows in rainforest as an understory tree in the area from about Ravenshoe to about Rossville. It occurs on the higher peaks of the region at altitudes between 650 and 1,600 m (2,130 and 5,250 ft).

== Conservation ==
As of June 2026, this species has been assessed to be of least concern by the International Union for Conservation of Nature (IUCN) and by the Queensland Government under its Nature Conservation Act.

== Gallery ==
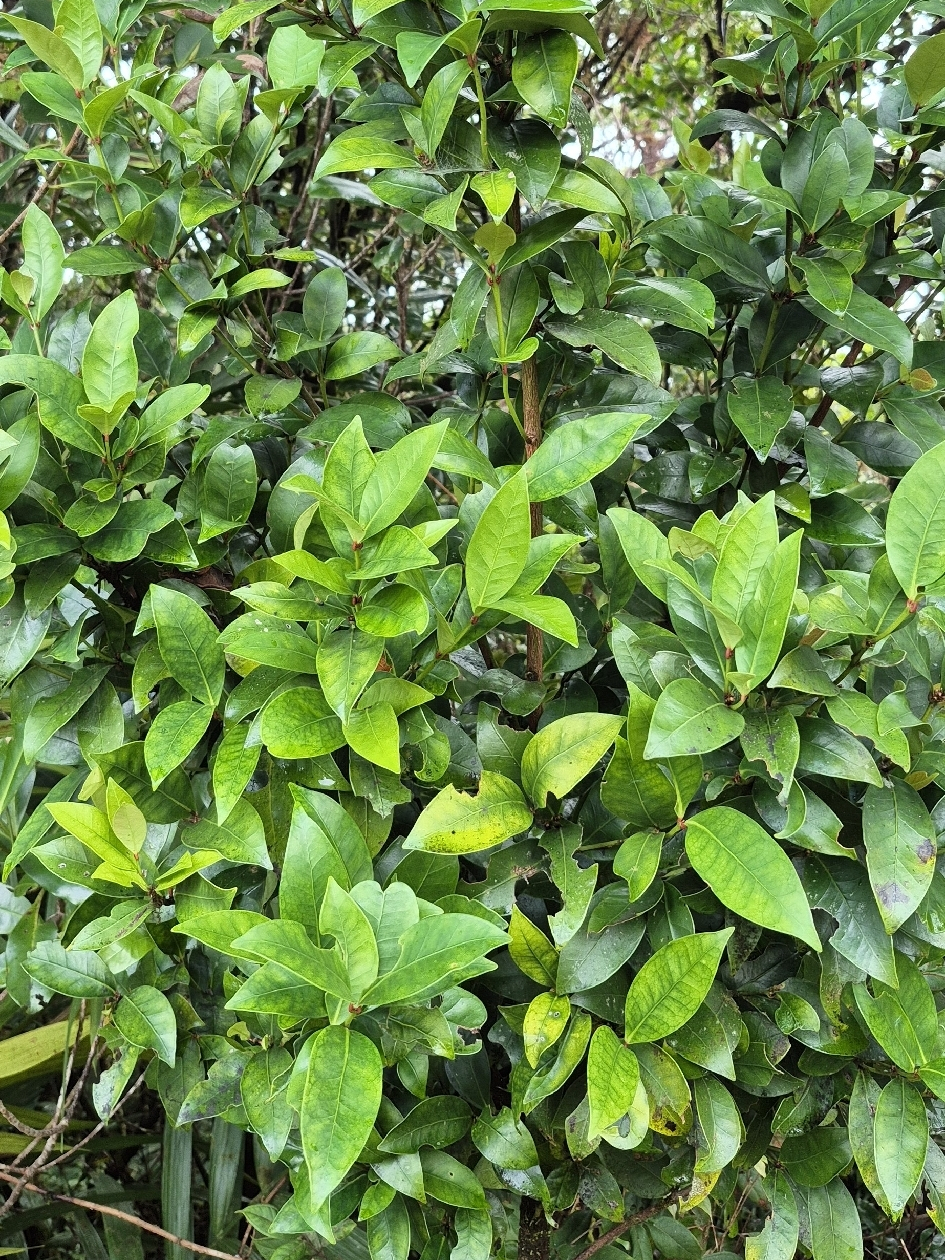
Habit

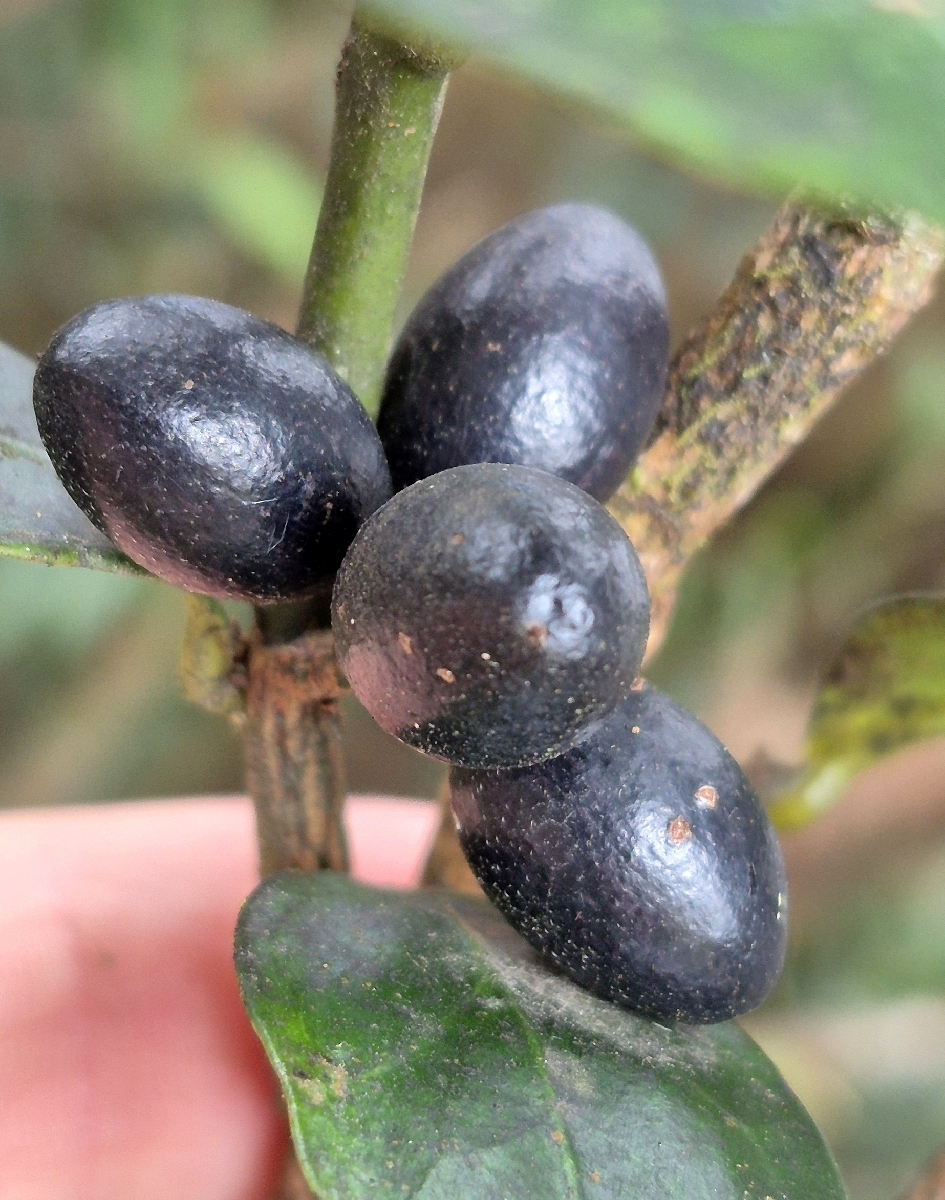
Ripe fruit

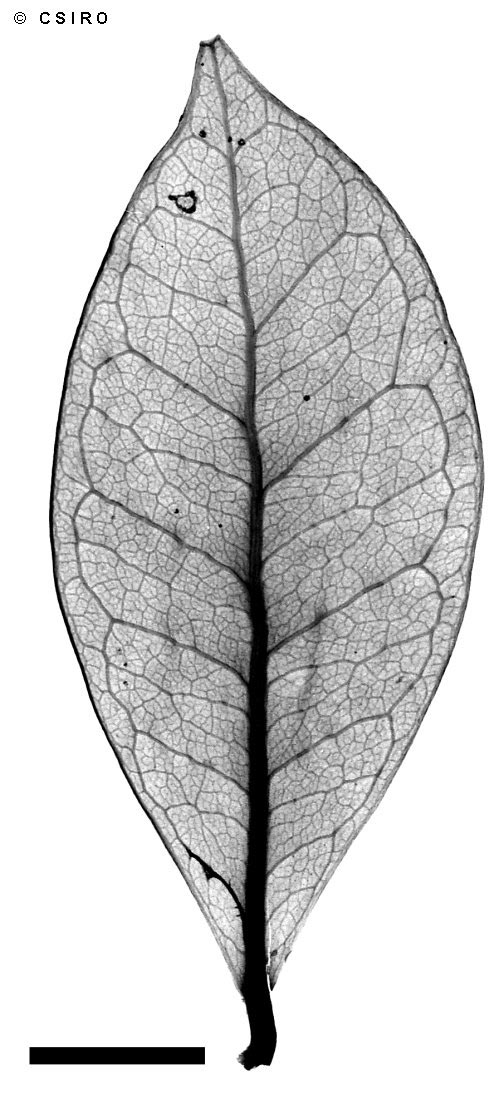
X-ray of a leaf
