= Albert Cleuter =

Belgian botanical artist

Xymalos monospora by Cleuter

Albert Henri Victor Cleuter (10 August 1901, in Saint-Josse-ten-Noode – 1996) was a Belgian botanical artist. He was the only child of Francois Ernest Cleuter and Henriette Marie Catherine Denys of Brussels. The father loved to draw and produced ink and watercolour sketches admired by his son.

Albert enrolled at the Académie Royale des Beaux-Arts in Brussels in August 1917 where he successfully completed a year of design study and 4 years of architecture and related courses, and two years of ornamental composition. He also produced sketches and designs for ladies' fashion.

At the Botanical Garden of Belgium he succeeded Hélène Durand, a prolific illustrator of conifers. A master at developing his own style, Albert Cleuter, was active as botanical illustrator at the Jardin Botanique National de Belgique from 1936 to 1966, his style becoming an accepted standard there. An architect by training, he discovered a new vocation in botanical illustration and produced hundreds of plates, proving himself to be a great observer, and creating virtuoso work with his pen. He occasionally used the time-consuming stipple technique for shading when he felt that a line drawing was not adequate.

During the war years he worked as illustrator for the underground paper La Libre Belgique and forged identity documents for fugitives such as downed pilots.

Cleuter illustrated works for W Robyns: "Flore du Congo Belge et Ruanda-Urundi" 1948+; André Lawalrée: "Flore gén Belgique" 1950-9; J Fouarge/J Louis: "Essences forestières d'Afrique"; F White: "Forest Flora N Rhodesia" 1962.
