= Mollinedia butleriana =

Conservation status
- Least Concern (IUCN 3.1)

Scientific classification
- Kingdom: Plantae
- Clade: Tracheophytes
- Clade: Angiosperms
- Clade: Magnoliids
- Order: Laurales
- Family: Monimiaceae
- Genus: Mollinedia
- Species: M. butleriana

Binomial name
- Mollinedia butleriana Standl.

Synonyms
- Mollinedia gentryi Peixoto

Species of flowering plant

Mollinedia butleriana is a species of flowering plant in the Monimiaceae family. It is a shrub or small tree, which grows two to six meters tall, that is native to Honduras and the Mexican states of Oaxaca and Veracruz. It grows in forest understory and near watercourses in evergreen rain forests, and montane moist forests with Quercus and Liquidambar, from 500 to 1200 meters elevation.
