= Matthaea sancta =

Conservation status
- Least Concern (IUCN 3.1)

Scientific classification
- Kingdom: Plantae
- Clade: Embryophytes
- Clade: Tracheophytes
- Clade: Spermatophytes
- Clade: Angiosperms
- Clade: Magnoliids
- Order: Laurales
- Family: Monimiaceae
- Genus: Matthaea
- Species: M. sancta

Binomial name
- Matthaea sancta Blume

Synonyms
- Matthaea calophylla Perkins; Matthaea latifolia Perkins; Matthaea sancta var. mindanaoensis Perkins; Matthaea sancta var. venulosa Perkins; Mollinedia sancta (Blume) Baill.

Species of flowering plant

Matthaea sancta is a species of flowering plant in the Monimiaceae family. It is a shrub or tree native to Borneo, Peninsular Malaysia and Singapore, the Philippines, Sulawesi, and Sumatra.
