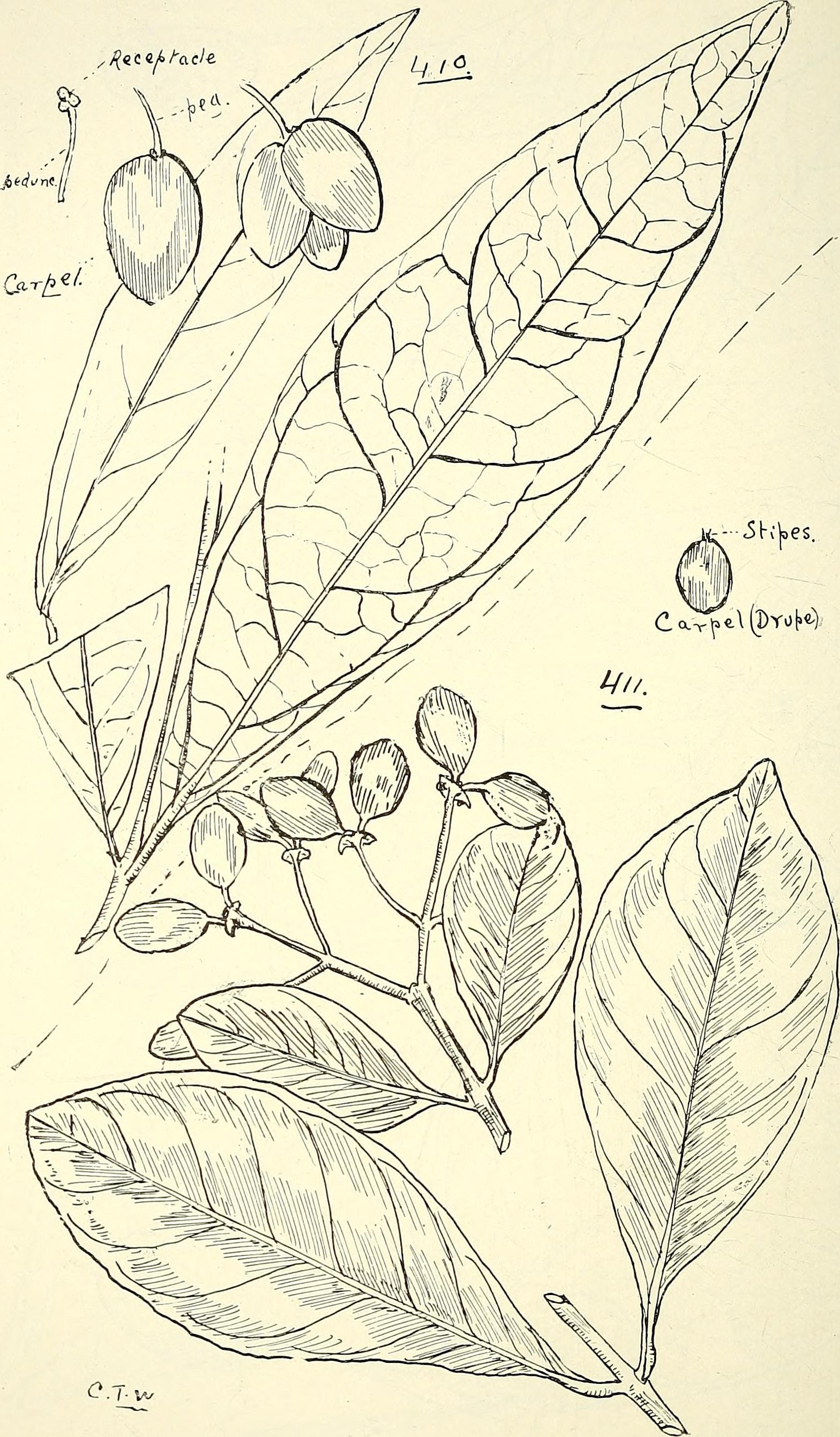
- Illustration of Pendressia wardellii (as Mollinedia wardellii – bottom), with Wilkiea angustifolia (as Mollinedia angustifolia - top)

Scientific classification
- Kingdom: Plantae
- Clade: Tracheophytes
- Clade: Angiosperms
- Clade: Magnoliids
- Order: Laurales
- Family: Monimiaceae
- Genus: Pendressia; Whiffin
- Species: P. wardellii

Binomial name
- Pendressia wardellii (F.Muell.) Whiffin

Synonyms
- Endressia wardellii (F.Muell.) Whiffin; Mollinedia wardellii F.Muell.; Wilkiea wardellii (F.Muell.) Perkins

= Pendressia =

Genus of flowering plants

Pendressia wardellii is a species of flowering plant in the family Monimiaceae, and is the sole species in the genus Pendressia. It is a tall shrub to small tree endemic to north-eastern Queensland. It has egg-shaped to elliptic leaves, male flowers and female flowers on separate plants, male flowers with 10 to 15 stamens and female flowers with 8 to 10 carpels, and red drupes.

== Description ==
Pendressia wardellii is a tall shrub or small tree that typically grows to a height of 4–20 m (13–66 ft). Its leaves are egg-shaped to elliptic, 40–130 mm (1.6–5.1 in) long and 20–60 mm (0.79–2.36 in) wide on a red petiole 8–13 mm (0.31–0.51 in) long. The midvein is prominent on both surfaces of the leaves. Male and female flowers are borne on separate plants. Male flowers are borne in large, highly branched clusters 30–70 mm (1.2–2.8 in) long, each flower more or less spherical to club-shaped, about 3 mm (0.12 in) in diameter with 2 pairs of tepals and usually 10–15 stamens. Female flowers are borne in small clusters 10–40 mm (0.39–1.57 in) long, each flower more or less spherical with 8 to 10 carpels. Flowering occurs from September to December, and the fruit is a red, more or less spherical drupe, 10–15 mm (0.39–0.59 in) long and 10–12 mm (0.39–0.47 in) wide.

== Taxonomy ==
This species was first formally described in 1866 by Ferdinand von Mueller who gave it the name Mollinedia wardellii in his Fragmenta Phytographiae Australiae from specimens collected near Rockingham Bay by John Dallachy. In 1898, Janet Russell Perkins transferred the species to Wilkiea as W. wardellii and in 2018 Trevor Paul Whiffin placed it in the new monotypic genus Pendressia as P. wardellii. The specific epithet (wardellii) honours von Mueller's friend, William Wardell.

== Distribution and habitat ==
Pendressia wardellii grows in rainforest at altitudes between 1,000 and 1,260 m (3,280 and 4,130 ft) on the Windsor, Mount Carbine and northern Atherton Tablelands in north-east Queensland.
