= Mollinedia glabra =

Conservation status
- Vulnerable (IUCN 2.3)

Scientific classification
- Kingdom: Plantae
- Clade: Embryophytes
- Clade: Tracheophytes
- Clade: Spermatophytes
- Clade: Angiosperms
- Clade: Magnoliids
- Order: Laurales
- Family: Monimiaceae
- Genus: Mollinedia
- Species: M. glabra

Binomial name
- Mollinedia glabra Perkins

Synonyms
- Mollinedia pellucens Tul.; Mollinedia sphaerantha Perkins; Mollinedia undulata Perkins; Citrosma glabra Spreng.; Siparuna glabra A.DC.

Species of flowering plant

Mollinedia glabra is a species of plant in the Monimiaceae family. It is a tree endemic to eastern Brazil. It is threatened by habitat loss.
