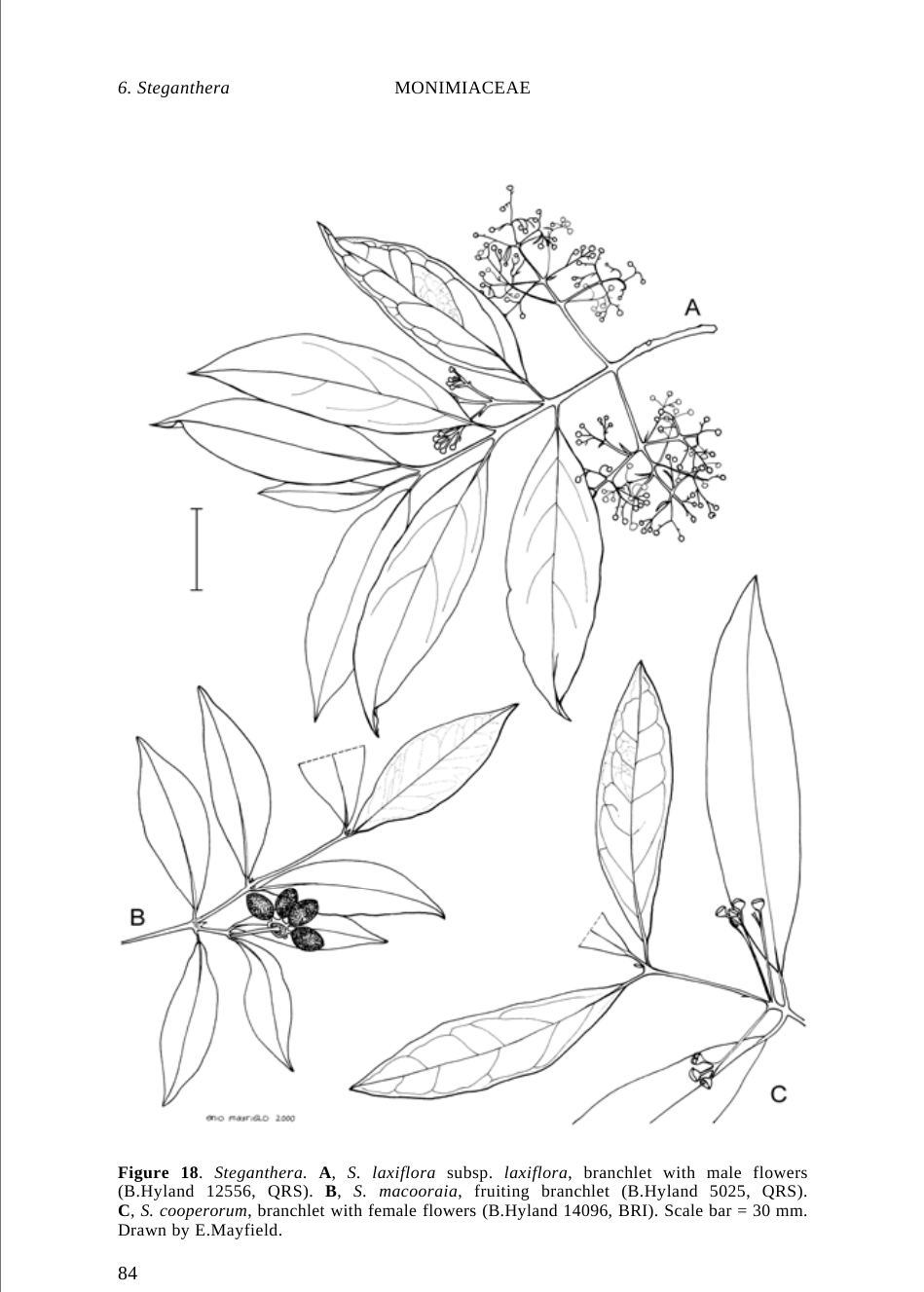
- Botanical sketch of S. laxiflora, S. macooraia and S. cooperorum

Scientific classification
- Kingdom: Plantae
- Clade: Tracheophytes
- Clade: Angiosperms
- Clade: Magnoliids
- Order: Laurales
- Family: Monimiaceae
- Genus: Steganthera; Perkins

Synonyms
- Anthobembix Perkins; Tetrasynandra Perkins

= Steganthera =

Genus of plants

Steganthera is a genus of flowering plants belonging to the family Monimiaceae. Its native range is from Sulawesi through Maluku Islands, New Guinea, the Bismarck Archipelago, and Solomon Islands to Queensland.

== Species ==
As of January 2026, Plants of the World Online accepts the following 28 species:

- Steganthera alpina Perkins
- Steganthera atepala Perkins
- Steganthera australiana C.T.White
- Steganthera chimbuensis Philipson
- Steganthera cooperorum Whiffin
- Steganthera cyclopensis Philipson
- Steganthera dentata (Valeton) Kaneh. & Hatus.
- Steganthera fasciculata Philipson
- Steganthera hentyi Philipson
- Steganthera hirsuta Perkins
- Steganthera hospitans (Becc.) Kaneh. & Hatus.
- Steganthera ilicifolia A.C.Sm.
- Steganthera insculpta Perkins
- Steganthera laxiflora (Benth.) Whiffin & Foreman
- Steganthera ledermannii (Perkins) Kaneh. & Hatus.
- Steganthera macooraia (F.M.Bailey) P.K.Endress
- Steganthera moszkowskii (Perkins) Kaneh. & Hatus.
- Steganthera myrtifolia (A.C.Sm.) Philipson
- Steganthera odontophylla Perkins
- Steganthera oligantha (Perkins) Kaneh. & Hatus.
- Steganthera parvifolia (Perkins) Kaneh. & Hatus.
- Steganthera psychotrioides Perkins
- Steganthera pycnoneura Perkins
- Steganthera royenii Philipson
- Steganthera salomonensis (Hemsl.) Philipson
- Steganthera stevensii W.N.Takeuchi
- Steganthera suberosoalata Kosterm.
- Steganthera symplocoides Perkins
