= Mollinedia lamprophylla =

Conservation status
- Near Threatened (IUCN 3.1)

Scientific classification
- Kingdom: Plantae
- Clade: Tracheophytes
- Clade: Angiosperms
- Clade: Magnoliids
- Order: Laurales
- Family: Monimiaceae
- Genus: Mollinedia
- Species: M. lamprophylla

Binomial name
- Mollinedia lamprophylla Perkins

Species of plant

Mollinedia lamprophylla is a species of flowering plant in the Monimiaceae family of the Laurales oeder. It is a tree endemic Rio de Janeiro state in southeastern Brazil.

Mollinedia lamprophylla is an understorey species, (formerly) found along stream sides of Atlantic Forest habitats in the Corcovado area.

The IUCN Red List assesses the species as Near threatened.
