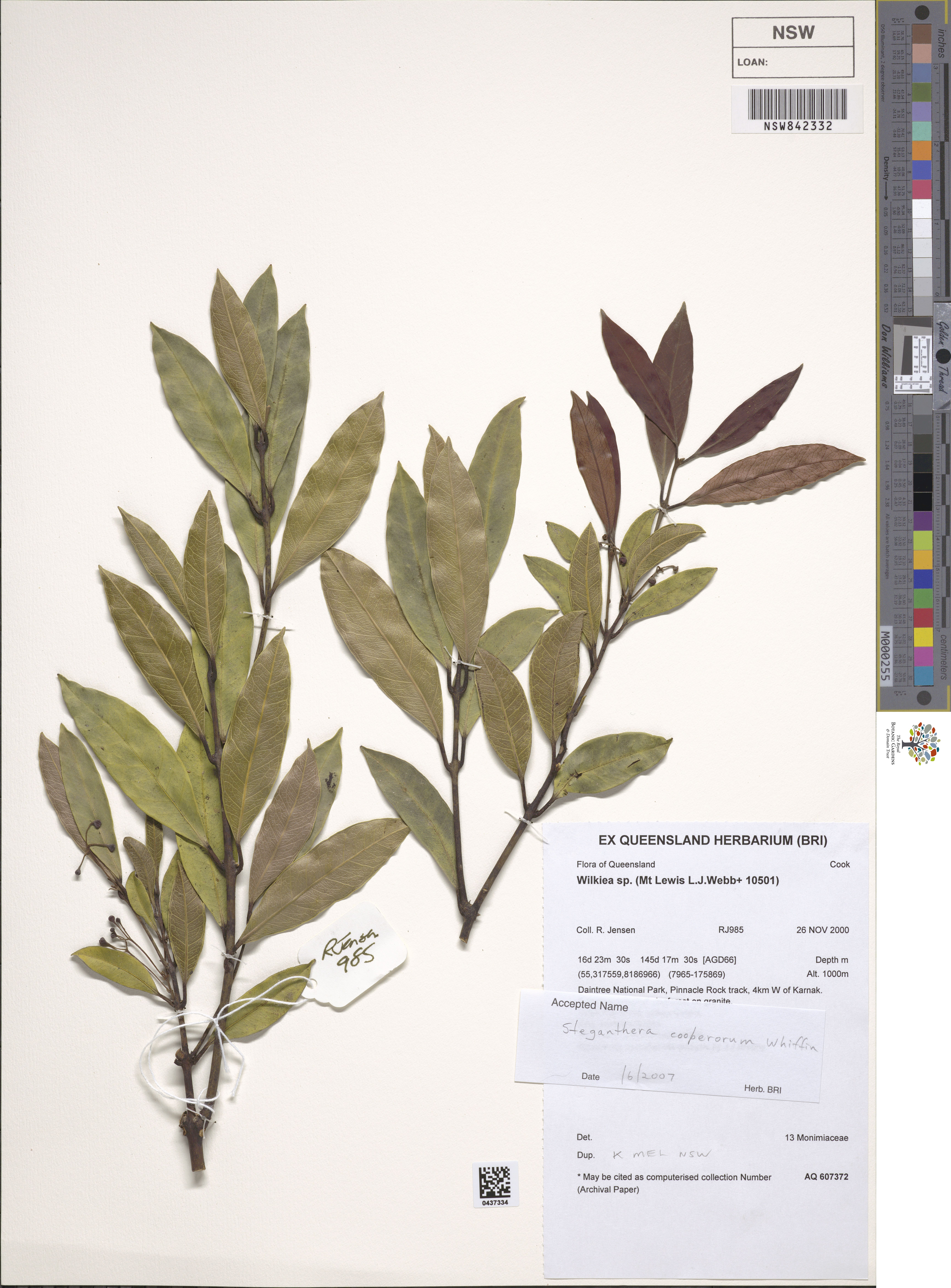
- Herbarium specimen

Conservation status
- Least Concern (NCA)

Scientific classification
- Kingdom: Plantae
- Clade: Tracheophytes
- Clade: Angiosperms
- Clade: Magnoliids
- Order: Laurales
- Family: Monimiaceae
- Genus: Steganthera
- Species: S. cooperorum

Binomial name
- Steganthera cooperorum Whiffin

= Steganthera cooperorum =

Species of flowering plant

Steganthera cooperorum is a species of plant in the family Monimiaceae endemic to the Wet Tropics bioregion of Queensland, Australia. It is a shrub or small tree up to 10 m (33 ft) tall that grows as an understory plant in rainforest, at altitudes from 400 to 1,200 m (1,300 to 3,900 ft).

== Taxonomy ==
The plant was first described in 2007 by Australian botanist Trevor Paul Whiffin, and published in Flora of Australia. Prior to publication the species was known by the phrase name "Wilkiea sp. (Mt Lewis L.J.Webb+ 10501)".

=== Etymology ===
The genus name Steganthera is derived from the Greek words στέγος (stegos), meaning 'cover' or 'roof', and ἀνθηρός (anthera), flower. The species epithet cooperorum was chosen by Whiffen to honour Bill and Wendy Cooper.

== Conservation ==
This species is listed as least concern under the Queensland Government's Nature Conservation Act. As of 14 November 2025, it has not been assessed by the International Union for Conservation of Nature (IUCN).
