= Mollinedia viridiflora =

Conservation status
- Least Concern (IUCN 3.1)

Scientific classification
- Kingdom: Plantae
- Clade: Embryophytes
- Clade: Tracheophytes
- Clade: Spermatophytes
- Clade: Angiosperms
- Clade: Magnoliids
- Order: Laurales
- Family: Monimiaceae
- Genus: Mollinedia
- Species: M. viridiflora

Binomial name
- Mollinedia viridiflora Tul.

Synonyms
- Mollinedia darienensis Standl.; Mollinedia flavida Lundell; Mollinedia guatemalensis Perkins; Mollinedia mexicana Perkins; Mollinedia minutiflora Standl. & L.O.Williams; Mollinedia nigrescens Tul.; Mollinedia orizabae Perkins; Mollinedia pauciflora Lundell; Mollinedia pinchotiana Perkins; Mollinedia ruae L.O.Williams & Ant.Molina; Mollinedia stipitata J.A.Duke; Mollinedia viridiflora var. glabra A.DC.

Species of flowering plant

Mollinedia viridiflora is a species of flowering plant in the Monimiaceae family. It is a tree native to the tropical Americas, ranging from central Mexico through southern Mexico and Central America to Colombia. It grows in lowland and montane tropical moist forests up to 3,081 metres elevation.

The species was described by Edmond Tulasne in 1855.
