= Carnegieodoxa =

Scientific classification
- Kingdom: Plantae
- Clade: Tracheophytes
- Clade: Angiosperms
- Clade: Magnoliids
- Order: Laurales
- Family: Monimiaceae
- Genus: Carnegieodoxa; Perkins

Genus of flowering plants

Carnegieodoxa is a genus of flowering plants belonging to the family Monimiaceae.

Its native range is New Caledonia.

Species:

- Carnegieodoxa eximia (Perkins) Perkins
