= Mollinedia gilgiana =

Conservation status
- Critically Endangered (IUCN 2.3)

Scientific classification
- Kingdom: Plantae
- Clade: Tracheophytes
- Clade: Angiosperms
- Clade: Magnoliids
- Order: Laurales
- Family: Monimiaceae
- Genus: Mollinedia
- Species: M. gilgiana

Binomial name
- Mollinedia gilgiana Perkins

Species of flowering plant

Mollinedia gilgiana is a species of plant in the Monimiaceae family. The plant is endemic to the Atlantic Forest ecoregion in southeastern Brazil. It is a Critically endangered species, threatened by habitat loss.
