= Macropeplus =

Macropeplus may refer to:

- Macropeplus (bug), a genus of true bugs in the family Miridae
- Macropeplus (plant), a genus of plants in the family Monimiaceae
