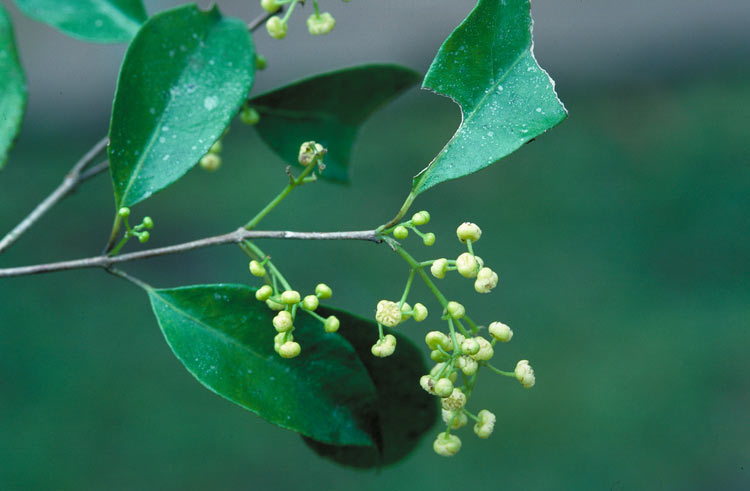
- Leaves and flowers

Conservation status
- Least Concern (IUCN 3.1)

Scientific classification
- Kingdom: Plantae
- Clade: Embryophytes
- Clade: Tracheophytes
- Clade: Spermatophytes
- Clade: Angiosperms
- Clade: Magnoliids
- Order: Laurales
- Family: Monimiaceae
- Genus: Levieria
- Species: L. acuminata

Binomial name
- Levieria acuminata Perkins

Synonyms
- Mollinedia acuminata F.Muell.

= Levieria acuminata =

Species of flowering plant

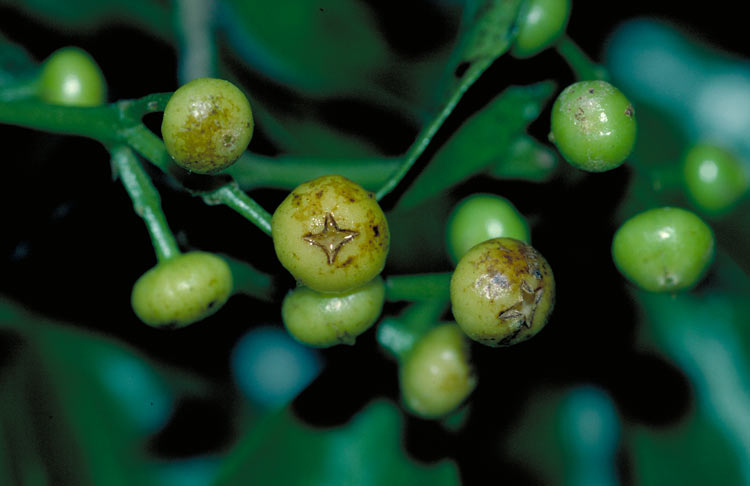
Female flowers

Levieria acuminata, commonly known as straw beech, is a species of plant in the family Monimiaceae. It is native to Papua New Guinea and the Australian state of Queensland.

== Description ==
Levieria acuminata is a tree which may reach a height of 20 m (66 ft). The leaves are arranged in opposite pairs on the twigs and are usually glabrous (hairless). They are ovate in outline (broad at the base and narrowing towards the tip) or elliptic. The inflorescences carry flowers that are either male only or female only. Male inflorescences grow to about 5 cm (2.0 in) long, female ones to about 3 cm (1.2 in) long. Both flower types are globose and 5 mm (0.20 in) diameter. The fruit is a reddish black ovoid drupe about 8 mm (0.31 in) long containing a single seed.

== Taxonomy ==
This species was originally described as Mollinedia acuminata by Ferdinand von Mueller in 1866, and was transferred to its current name in 1901 by Janet Russell Perkins.

== Conservation ==
As of June 2026, this species has been assessed to be of least concern by the International Union for Conservation of Nature (IUCN) and by the Queensland Government under its Nature Conservation Act.
