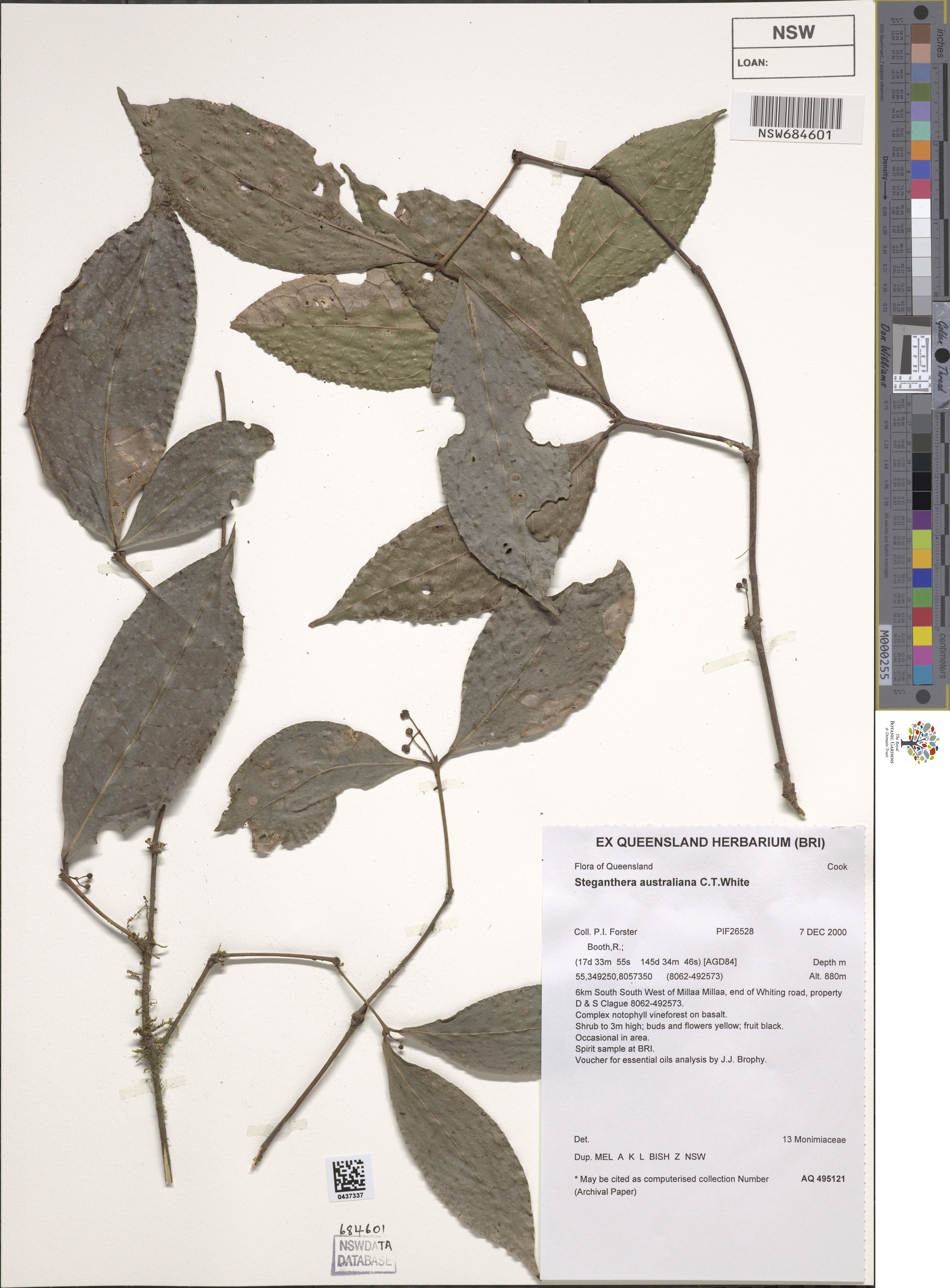
- Herbarium specimen

Conservation status
- Near Threatened (NCA)

Scientific classification
- Kingdom: Plantae
- Clade: Tracheophytes
- Clade: Angiosperms
- Clade: Magnoliids
- Order: Laurales
- Family: Monimiaceae
- Genus: Steganthera
- Species: S. australiana

Binomial name
- Steganthera australiana C.T.White
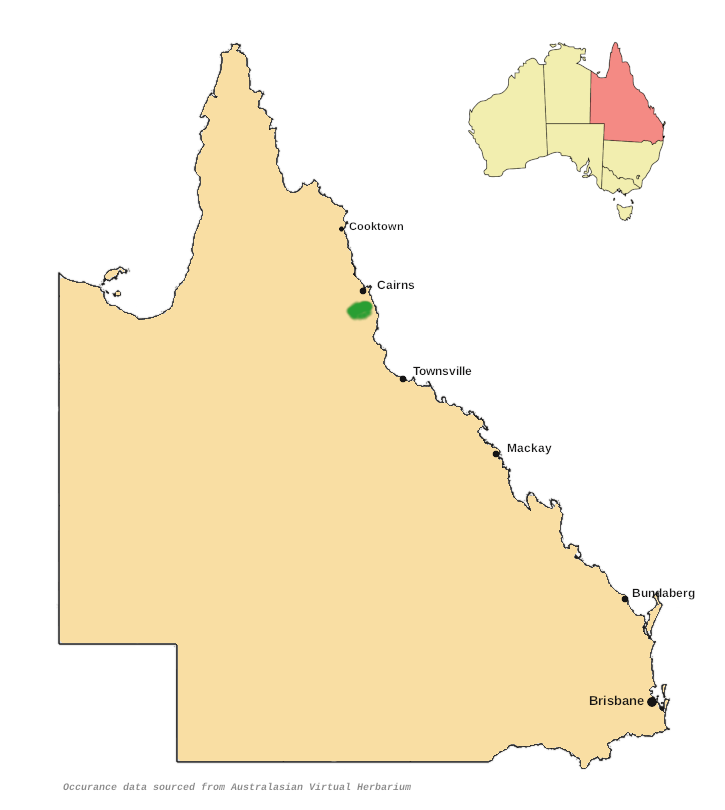

= Steganthera australiana =

Species of flowering plant

Steganthera australiana is a species of plant in the family Monimiaceae. It is native to New Guinea and the Wet Tropics bioregion of Queensland, Australia, where it is restricted to a small area near Cairns. It is a shrub or small tree reaching up to 5 m (16 ft) in height. It was first described in 1944, and in Queensland it has the conservation status of near threatened.

== Taxonomy ==
The plant was first described in 1944 by Australian botanist Cyril Tenison White. The type specimen was collected by White in 1941 at Garradunga, a rural area just north of Innisfail.

=== Etymology ===
The genus name Steganthera is derived from the Greek words στέγος (stegos), meaning 'cover' or 'roof', and ἀνθηρός (anthera), flower. The species epithet australiana means 'from Australia'.

== Distribution and habitat ==
Steganthera australiana occurs in rainforest on the Atherton Tableland southwest of Cairns, as well as the coastal lowlands south of Cairns. The altitudinal range is from sea level to about 1,000 m (3,300 ft). It also occurs in New Guinea.

== Conservation ==
This species is listed as near threatened under the Queensland Government's Nature Conservation Act. As of November 2025, it has not been assessed by the International Union for Conservation of Nature (IUCN).
