= Macrotorus utriculatus =

Conservation status
- Least Concern (IUCN 3.1)

Scientific classification
- Kingdom: Plantae
- Clade: Embryophytes
- Clade: Tracheophytes
- Clade: Spermatophytes
- Clade: Angiosperms
- Clade: Magnoliids
- Order: Laurales
- Family: Monimiaceae
- Genus: Macrotorus
- Species: M. utriculatus

Binomial name
- Macrotorus utriculatus (Mart. ex Tul.) Perkins

Synonyms
- Mollinedia utriculata Mart. ex Tul.

Genus of plants

Macrotorus utriculatus is a species of flowering plant belonging to the family Monimiaceae. It is a shrub or tree native to southeastern Brazil.
