= Kibara obtusa =

Conservation status
- Vulnerable (IUCN 3.1)

Scientific classification
- Kingdom: Plantae
- Clade: Embryophytes
- Clade: Tracheophytes
- Clade: Spermatophytes
- Clade: Angiosperms
- Clade: Magnoliids
- Order: Laurales
- Family: Monimiaceae
- Genus: Kibara
- Species: K. obtusa

Binomial name
- Kibara obtusa Blume

Synonyms
- Kibara depauperata Merr.

Species of tree

Kibara obtusa is a tree in the family Monimiaceae. The specific epithet obtusa means 'rounded', referring to the apex of the leaf.

== Description ==
Kibara obtusa grows up to 20 m (70 ft) tall, with a trunk diameter of up to 20 cm (8 in). The yellow bark is fissured or scaly. The leaves are elliptic and measure up to 16.5 cm (6 in) long. The inflorescences are in cymes. The ovoid fruits ripen black and measure up to 2.4 cm (1 in) in diameter.

== Distribution and habitat ==
Kibara obtusa is native to Borneo, Sulawesi, the Philippines and New Guinea. Its habitat is rainforest, to elevations of 700 m (2,300 ft).
