= Lauterbachia =

Scientific classification
- Kingdom: Plantae
- Clade: Tracheophytes
- Clade: Angiosperms
- Clade: Magnoliids
- Order: Laurales
- Family: Monimiaceae
- Genus: Lauterbachia; Perkins
- Species: L. novoguineensis

Binomial name
- Lauterbachia novoguineensis Perkins

Species of flowering plants

Lauterbachia is a monotypic genus of flowering plants belonging to the family Monimiaceae. The only species is Lauterbachia novoguineensis Perkins.

It is native to New Guinea.

The genus name of Lauterbachia is in honour of Carl Adolf Georg Lauterbach (1864–1937), a German explorer and botanist. The Latin specific epithet of novoguineensis means from New Guinea (where the plant was found). Both genus and species were first described and published in K.M.Schumann & C.A.G.Lauterbach, Fl. Schutzgeb. Südsee on pages 330-331 in 1900.
