= Mollinedia engleriana =

Conservation status
- Least Concern (IUCN 3.1)

Scientific classification
- Kingdom: Plantae
- Clade: Tracheophytes
- Clade: Angiosperms
- Clade: Magnoliids
- Order: Laurales
- Family: Monimiaceae
- Genus: Mollinedia
- Species: M. engleriana

Binomial name
- Mollinedia engleriana Perkins

Synonyms
- Mollinedia pachypoda Perkins

Species of flowering plant

Mollinedia engleriana is a species of flowering plant in the Monimiaceae family. It is a tree endemic to southeastern Brazil. The species name "engleriana" honors Adolf Engler, a prominent German botanist. It is a tree and grows primarily in a wet and tropical biome.
