= Matthaea =

Scientific classification
- Kingdom: Plantae
- Clade: Tracheophytes
- Clade: Angiosperms
- Clade: Magnoliids
- Order: Laurales
- Family: Monimiaceae
- Genus: Matthaea; Blume

Genus of flowering plants

Matthaea is a genus of plant in family Monimiaceae. Its native range is Malesia. It contains the following accepted species:

- Matthaea chartacea Merr.
- Matthaea heterophylla Quisumb. & Merr.
- Matthaea intermedia Merr.
- Matthaea pubescens Merr. ex Perkins
- Matthaea sancta Blume
- Matthaea vidalii Perkins
