= Parakibara =

Scientific classification
- Kingdom: Plantae
- Clade: Tracheophytes
- Clade: Angiosperms
- Clade: Magnoliids
- Order: Laurales
- Family: Monimiaceae
- Genus: Parakibara; Philipson
- Species: P. clavigera

Binomial name
- Parakibara clavigera Philipson

Genus of plants

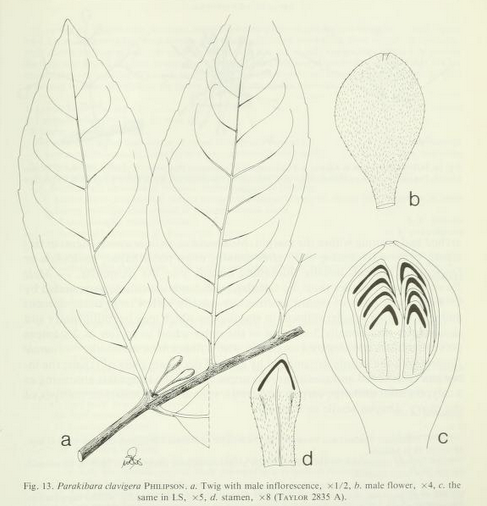
Parakibara clavigera illustration.

Parakibara is a monotypic genus of flowering plants belonging to the family Monimiaceae. The only species is Parakibara clavigera.

It is endemic to the Maluku Islands.
