= Kibaropsis =

Conservation status
- Least Concern (IUCN 3.1)

Scientific classification
- Kingdom: Plantae
- Clade: Embryophytes
- Clade: Tracheophytes
- Clade: Spermatophytes
- Clade: Angiosperms
- Clade: Magnoliids
- Order: Laurales
- Family: Monimiaceae
- Genus: Kibaropsis; Vieillard ex Jérémie
- Species: K. caledonica

Binomial name
- Kibaropsis caledonica (Guillaumin) Jérémie

Synonyms
- Hedycarya caledonica Guillaumin

Genus of flowering plants

Kibaropsis is a monotypic genus of plant in the Monimiaceae family. It is endemic to New Caledonia. Its only species is Kibaropsis caledonica. Phylogenetic studies suggest that it is nested in the more widespread genus Hedycarya, where it has once been placed.
