= Levieria =

Scientific classification
- Kingdom: Plantae
- Clade: Tracheophytes
- Clade: Angiosperms
- Clade: Magnoliids
- Order: Laurales
- Family: Monimiaceae
- Genus: Levieria; Becc.

Genus of plants

Levieria is a genus of flowering plants belonging to the family Monimiaceae. They are dioecious trees or shrubs.

It is native to Sulawesi, the Maluku Islands, New Guinea and Queensland (north-eastern Australia).

The genus name of Levieria is in honour of Emilio Levier (1839–1911), a Swiss-born Italian botanist, mycologist and plant collector in Florence. It was first described and published in Malesia Vol.1 on page 192 in 1877.

== Known species ==
According to Kew:

- Levieria acuminata (F.Muell.) Perkins – eastern New Guinea and northeastern Queensland
- Levieria beccariana Perkins – eastern New Guinea
- Levieria montana Becc. – Sulawesi, Maluku Islands, and New Guinea
- Levieria nitens Perkins – New Guinea
- Levieria orientalis Philipson – eastern New Guinea
- Levieria scandens Philipson – eastern New Guinea
- Levieria squarrosa Perkins – New Guinea
