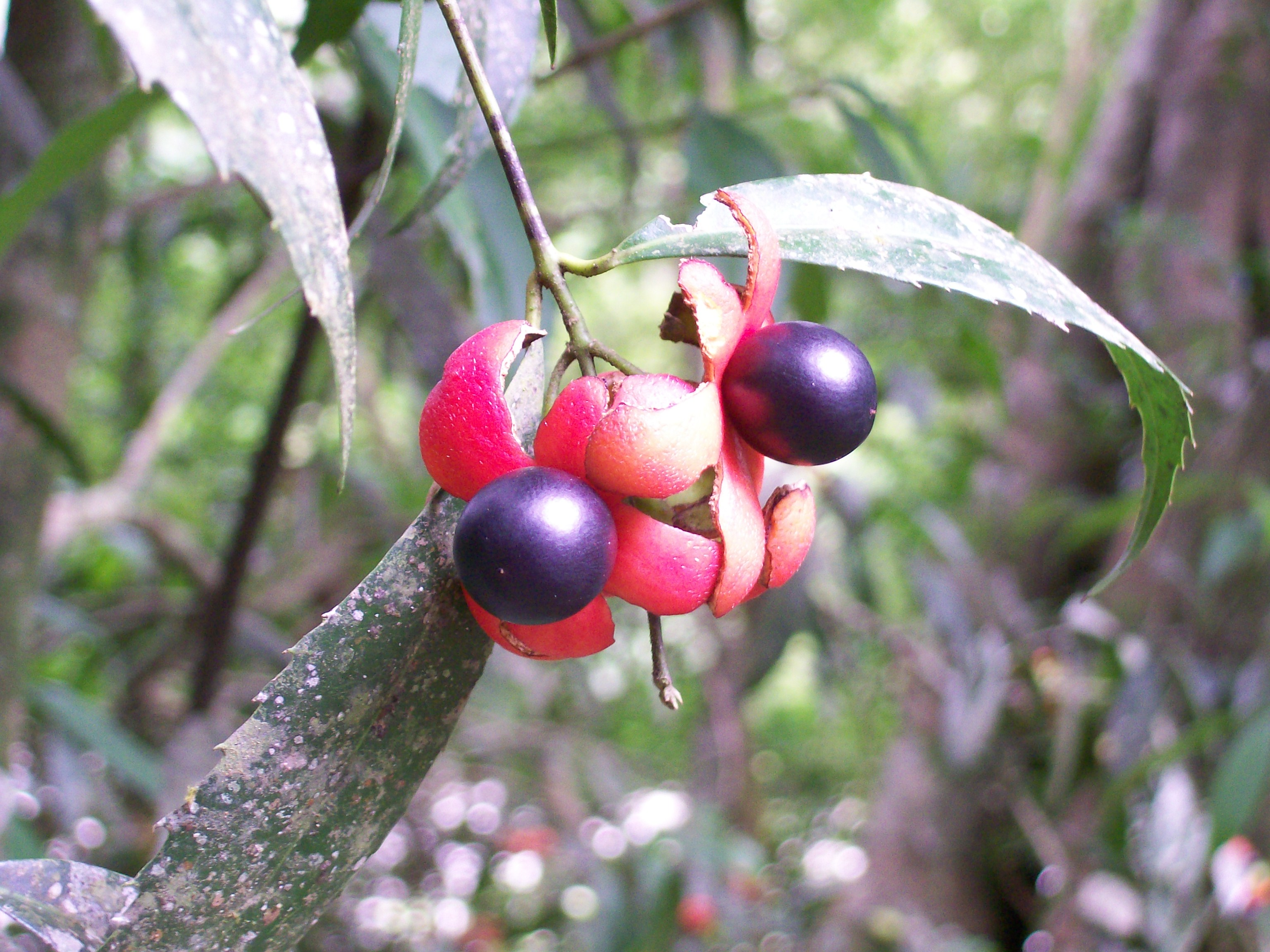
- Hennecartia omphalandra

Scientific classification
- Kingdom: Plantae
- Clade: Tracheophytes
- Clade: Angiosperms
- Clade: Magnoliids
- Order: Laurales
- Family: Monimiaceae
- Genus: Hennecartia; J.Poiss.
- Species: H. omphalandra

Binomial name
- Hennecartia omphalandra J.Poiss.

= Hennecartia =

Genus of plants

Hennecartia is a monotypic genus of flowering plants belonging to the family Monimiaceae. The only species is Hennecartia omphalandra.

It is native to southern Brazil, north-eastern Argentina and Paraguay.

The genus name of Hennecartia is in honour of Jules-François Hennecart (1797–1888), French politician and banker who acquired Victor Jacquemont's herbarium. The Latin specific epithet of omphalandra refers to the Ancient Greek word ὀμφᾰλός (omphalós) which means "navel". Hennecartia omphalandra was first described and published in Bull. Soc. Bot. France Vol.32 on page 41 in 1885.

It is a semi-deciduous tree with a narrow, dense, elongated crown and it can grow to 4–10 m (13–33 ft) tall.

It can be found in semi-deciduous forests, favouring alluvial soils but can tolerate a wide range of soils and moisture levels.
