= Grazielanthus =

Scientific classification
- Kingdom: Plantae
- Clade: Tracheophytes
- Clade: Angiosperms
- Clade: Magnoliids
- Order: Laurales
- Family: Monimiaceae
- Genus: Grazielanthus; Peixoto & Per.-Moura
- Species: G. arkeocarpus

Binomial name
- Grazielanthus arkeocarpus Peixoto & Per.-Moura

Genus of plants

Grazielanthus is a monotypic genus of flowering plants belonging to the family Monimiaceae. The only species is Grazielanthus arkeocarpus.

It is native to south-eastern Brazil.

The genus name of Grazielanthus is in honour of Graziela Maciel Barroso (1912–2003), a Brazilian botanist. The Latin specific epithet of arkeocarpus refers to arkeo meaning the ark-like structure and "carpus" = fruit or carpel, which comes from the protection of the fruitlets by the hypanthium (tube or cup-like structure in a flower that includes the bases of sepals, petals, and stamens. It was first described and published in Kew Bull. 63: 138 (2008).
