= Hemmantia =

Scientific classification
- Kingdom: Plantae
- Clade: Tracheophytes
- Clade: Angiosperms
- Clade: Magnoliids
- Order: Laurales
- Family: Monimiaceae
- Genus: Hemmantia; Whiffin
- Species: H. webbii

Binomial name
- Hemmantia webbii Whiffin

Genus of flowering plants

Hemmantia is a monotypic genus of flowering plants belonging to the family Monimiaceae. The only species is Hemmantia webbii.

Its native range is northeastern Queensland.
