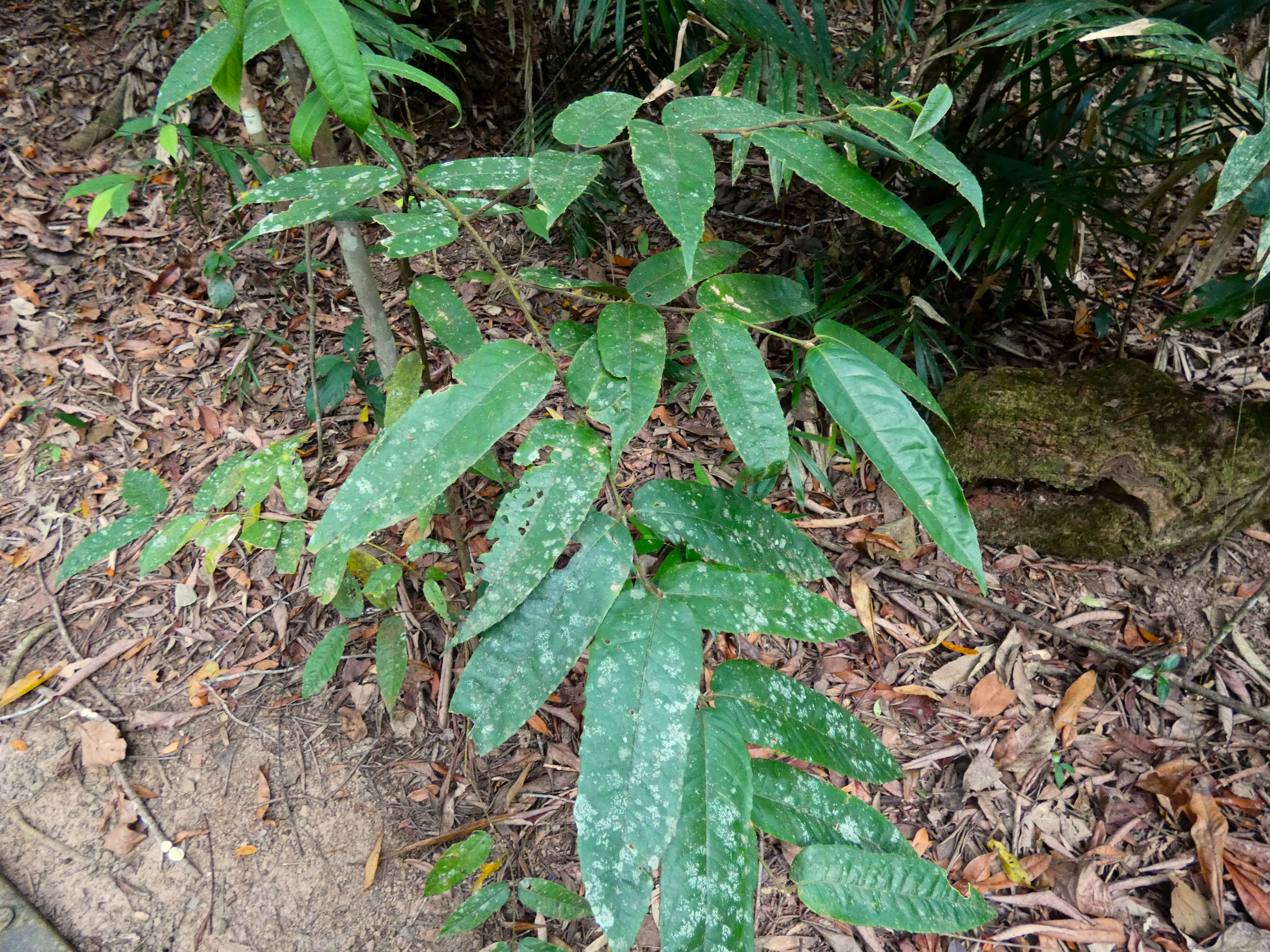
- In rainforest at Kuranda

Scientific classification
- Kingdom: Plantae
- Clade: Embryophytes
- Clade: Tracheophytes
- Clade: Spermatophytes
- Clade: Angiosperms
- Clade: Magnoliids
- Order: Laurales
- Family: Monimiaceae
- Genus: Austromatthaea; L.S.Sm.
- Species: A. elegans

Binomial name
- Austromatthaea elegans L.S.Sm.

= Austromatthaea =

Genus of flowering plants

Austromatthaea is a genus of plants in the family Monimiaceae. As of 2010, it is considered monospecific. The sole species, Austromatthaea elegans, is found in Queensland.
