= Kibara coriacea =

Conservation status
- Least Concern (IUCN 3.1)

Scientific classification
- Kingdom: Plantae
- Clade: Embryophytes
- Clade: Tracheophytes
- Clade: Spermatophytes
- Clade: Angiosperms
- Clade: Magnoliids
- Order: Laurales
- Family: Monimiaceae
- Genus: Kibara
- Species: K. coriacea

Binomial name
- Kibara coriacea (Blume) Hook.f. & Thomson

Synonyms
- Synonymy: Brongniartia coriacea Blume; Kibara angustifolia Perkins; Kibara blumei Steud.; Kibara chartacea Blume; Kibara clemensiae Perkins; Kibara cuspidata Blume; Kibara dichasialis Suess. & Heine; Kibara ellipsoidea Merr.; Kibara grandifolia Merr.; Kibara inamoena Perkins; Kibara longipes Perkins; Kibara macrocarpa Perkins; Kibara macrophylla Perkins; Kibara merrilliana Perkins; Kibara mollis Merr.; Kibara motleyi Perkins; Kibara schlechteri Perkins; Kibara serrulata Perkins; Kibara stapfiana Perkins; Kibara tomentosa Perkins; Kibara trichantha Perkins; Kibara vidalii Perkins; Kibara warburgii Perkins; Matthaea ellipsoidea (Merr.) Merr. ex Perkins; Mollinedia coriacea (Blume) Baill.; Sarcodiscus chloranthiformis Griff.; Sciadicarpus brongniartii Hassk.

Species of flowering plant

Kibara coriacea is a plant in the family Monimiaceae. The specific epithet coriacea is from the Latin meaning "leathery", referring to the leaves.

== Description ==
Kibara coriacea grows as a shrub or tree measuring up to 15 metres (50 ft) tall with a diameter of up to 15 centimetres (6 in). The smooth bark is pale grey. The ovoid fruits are drupes (pitted), ripen to deep blue, purple or black, and measure up to 2 cm (1 in) long. The fruits are considered edible.

== Distribution and habitat ==
Kibara coriacea is native to Myanmar, Thailand, Malesia (Malaysia, Singapore, and Indonesia), and New Guinea. Its habitat is lowland rain forests and lower montane forests from sea-level to 1,600 metres (5,200 ft) elevation.
