= Decarydendron =

Scientific classification
- Kingdom: Plantae
- Clade: Tracheophytes
- Clade: Angiosperms
- Clade: Magnoliids
- Order: Laurales
- Family: Monimiaceae
- Genus: Decarydendron; Danguy

Genus of plants

Decarydendron is a genus of flowering plants belonging to the family Monimiaceae.

Its native range is Madagascar.

The genus name of Decarydendron was named after Raymond Decary (1891–1973), French botanist, ethnologist and colonial administrator who conducted research in Madagascar and collected for the National Museum of Natural History, France.

Known species:

- Decarydendron helenae Danguy
- Decarydendron lamii Cavaco
- Decarydendron perrieri Cavaco
- Decarydendron ranomafanensis Lorence & Razafim.
