= Macrotorus =

Scientific classification
- Kingdom: Plantae
- Clade: Tracheophytes
- Clade: Angiosperms
- Clade: Magnoliids
- Order: Laurales
- Family: Monimiaceae
- Genus: Macrotorus; Perkins

Species
- Macrotorus genuflexus Lírio & Peixoto; Macrotorus utriculatus (Mart. ex Tul.) Perkins

Genus of flowering plants

Macrotorus is a genus of flowering plants in the family Monimiaceae. It includes two species native to southeastern Brazil:

- Macrotorus genuflexus Lírio & Peixoto
- Macrotorus utriculatus (Mart. ex Tul.) Perkins
