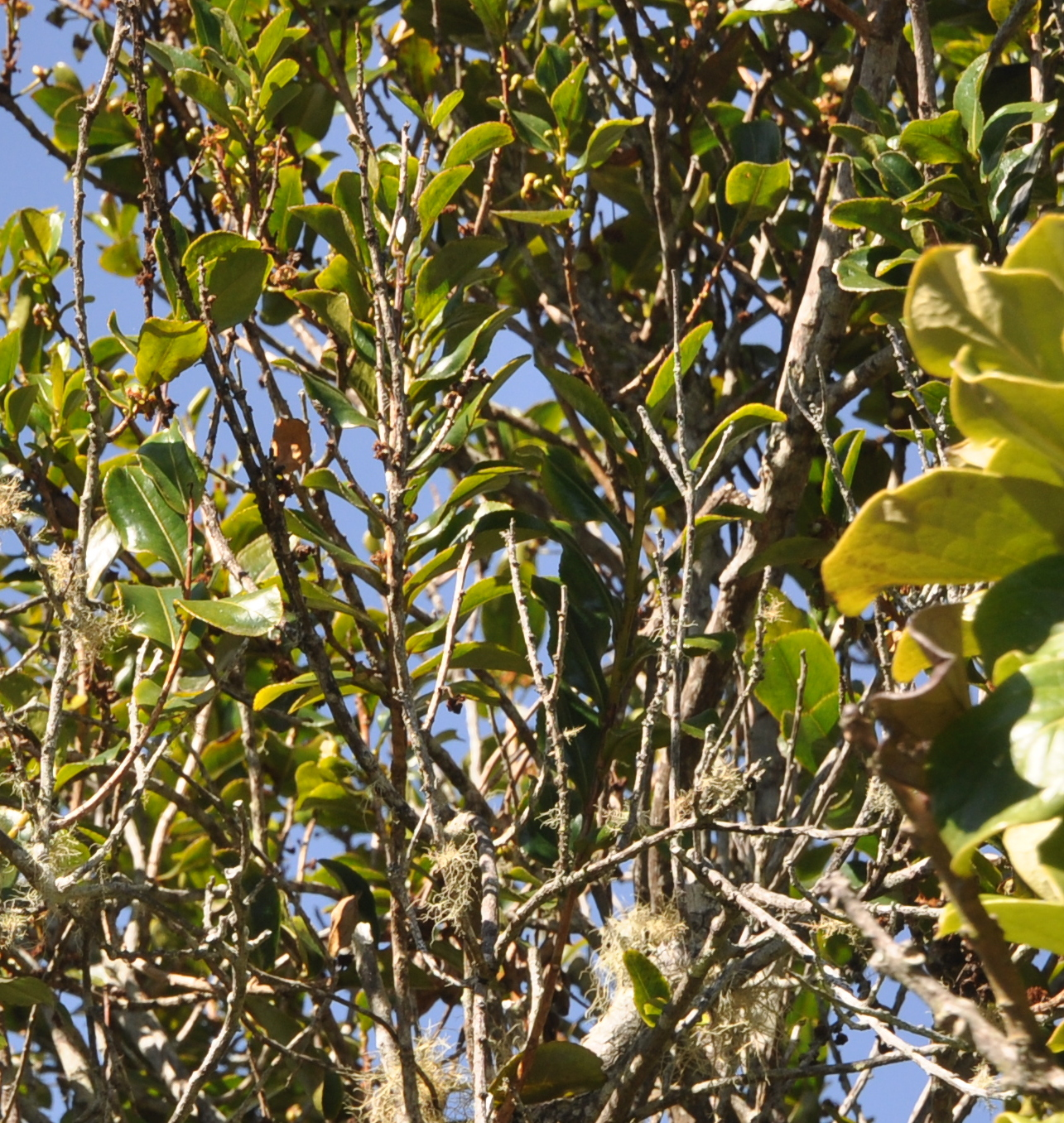

Scientific classification
- Kingdom: Plantae
- Clade: Tracheophytes
- Clade: Angiosperms
- Clade: Magnoliids
- Order: Laurales
- Family: Monimiaceae
- Genus: Monimia; Thouars (1804)

= Monimia =

Genus of flowering plants

Monimia is a genus of flowering plants of the family Monimiaceae. It includes three species of trees endemic to the Mascarene Islands.

== Species ==
- Monimia amplexicaulis Lorence – Réunion
- Monimia ovalifolia Thouars – Mauritius and Réunion
- Monimia rotundifolia Thouars – Réunion
