= Kairoa =

Scientific classification
- Kingdom: Plantae
- Clade: Tracheophytes
- Clade: Angiosperms
- Clade: Magnoliids
- Order: Laurales
- Family: Monimiaceae
- Genus: Kairoa; Philipson (1980)

Synonyms
- Faika Philipson (1985)

Genus of plants

Kairoa is a genus of flowering plants belonging to the family Monimiaceae.

Its native range is New Guinea.

Species:

- Kairoa cromeana W.N.Takeuchi
- Kairoa endressiana W.N.Takeuchi & S.S.Renner
- Kairoa suberosa Philipson
- Kairoa villosa (Kaneh. & Hatus.) S.S.Renner & W.N.Takeuchi
