= Macropeplus (plant) =

Scientific classification
- Kingdom: Plantae
- Clade: Tracheophytes
- Clade: Angiosperms
- Clade: Magnoliids
- Order: Laurales
- Family: Monimiaceae
- Genus: Macropeplus; Perkins

Genus of plants

Macropeplus is a genus of flowering plants belonging to the family Monimiaceae.

Its native range is Brazil.

== Species ==
Species:

- Macropeplus dentatus (Perkins) I.Santos & Peixoto
- Macropeplus friburgensis (Perkins) I.Santos & Peixoto
- Macropeplus ligustrinus (Tul.) Perkins
- Macropeplus schwackeanus (Perkins) I.Santos & Peixoto
