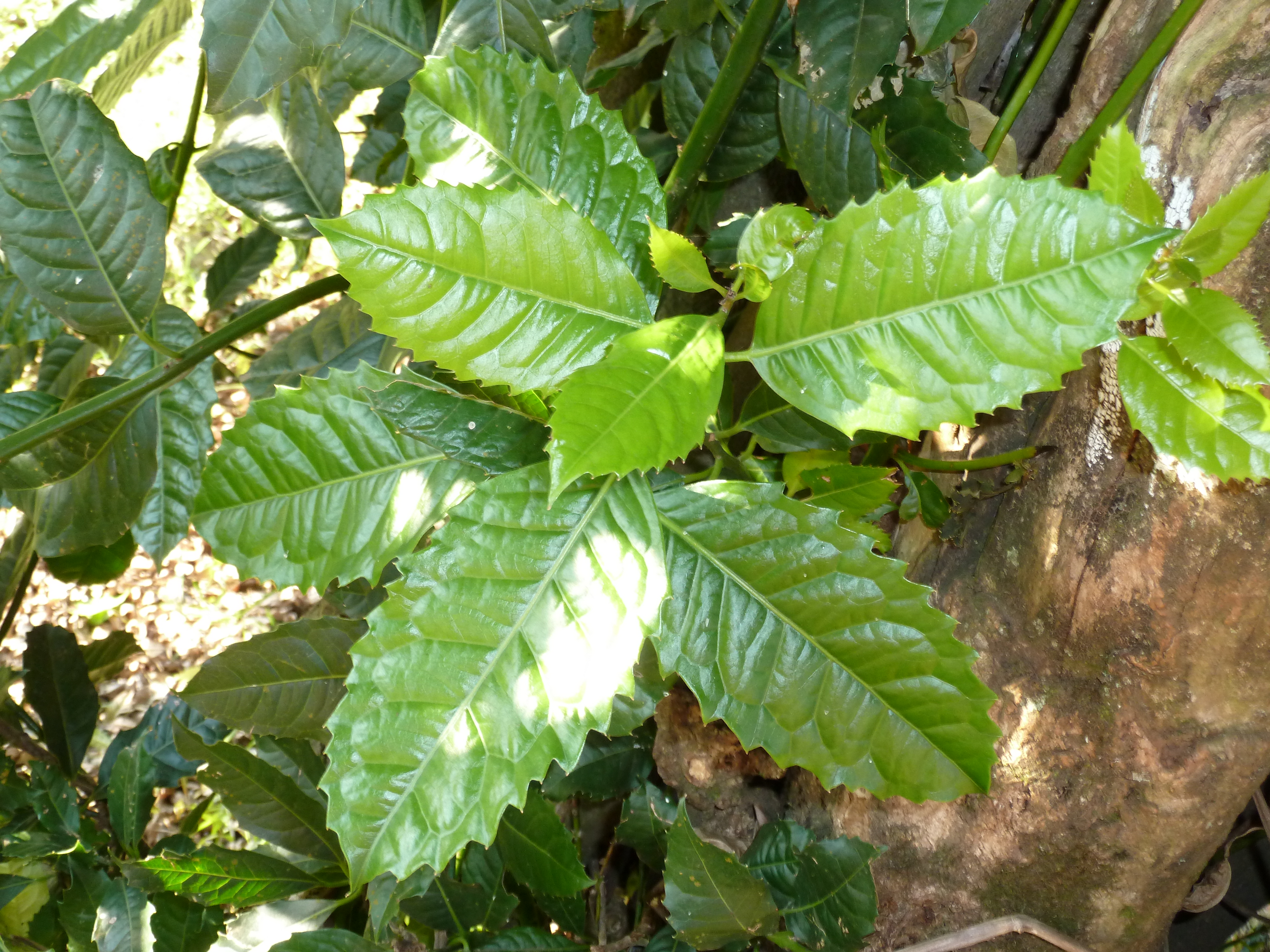
- New foliage of a tree in South Africa

Conservation status
- Least Concern (IUCN 3.1)

Scientific classification
- Kingdom: Plantae
- Clade: Embryophytes
- Clade: Tracheophytes
- Clade: Spermatophytes
- Clade: Angiosperms
- Clade: Magnoliids
- Order: Laurales
- Family: Monimiaceae
- Genus: Xymalos; Baill.
- Species: X. monospora

Binomial name
- Xymalos monospora (Harv.) Baill.

Synonyms
- Toxicodendron acutifolium Benth. Paxiodendron ulugurense Engl. Paxiodendron usambarense Engl. Xymalos mossambicensis Cavaco; Xymalos ulugurensis (Engl.) Engl. Xymalos usambarensis (Engl.) Engl. Xylosma monospora Harv.

= Xymalos =

Genus of plant in the family Monimiaceae

Xymalos monospora (plant family Monimiaceae), commonly known as lemonwood, is a species of evergreen tree native to Africa, the only species in the genus Xymalos. It is an Afromontane endemic, and can be found from 900 to 2700 meters elevation in the highlands of Eastern Africa from Sudan to South Africa, as well as on Mount Cameroon and Bioko in west-central Africa.

Lemonwood is commonly found in escarpment forest and regenerated scrub. Its leaves have a strong lemon scent when crushed. Fragrant yellow flowers appear in spring and are followed by small green capsules that take about a year to ripen.

== Gallery ==
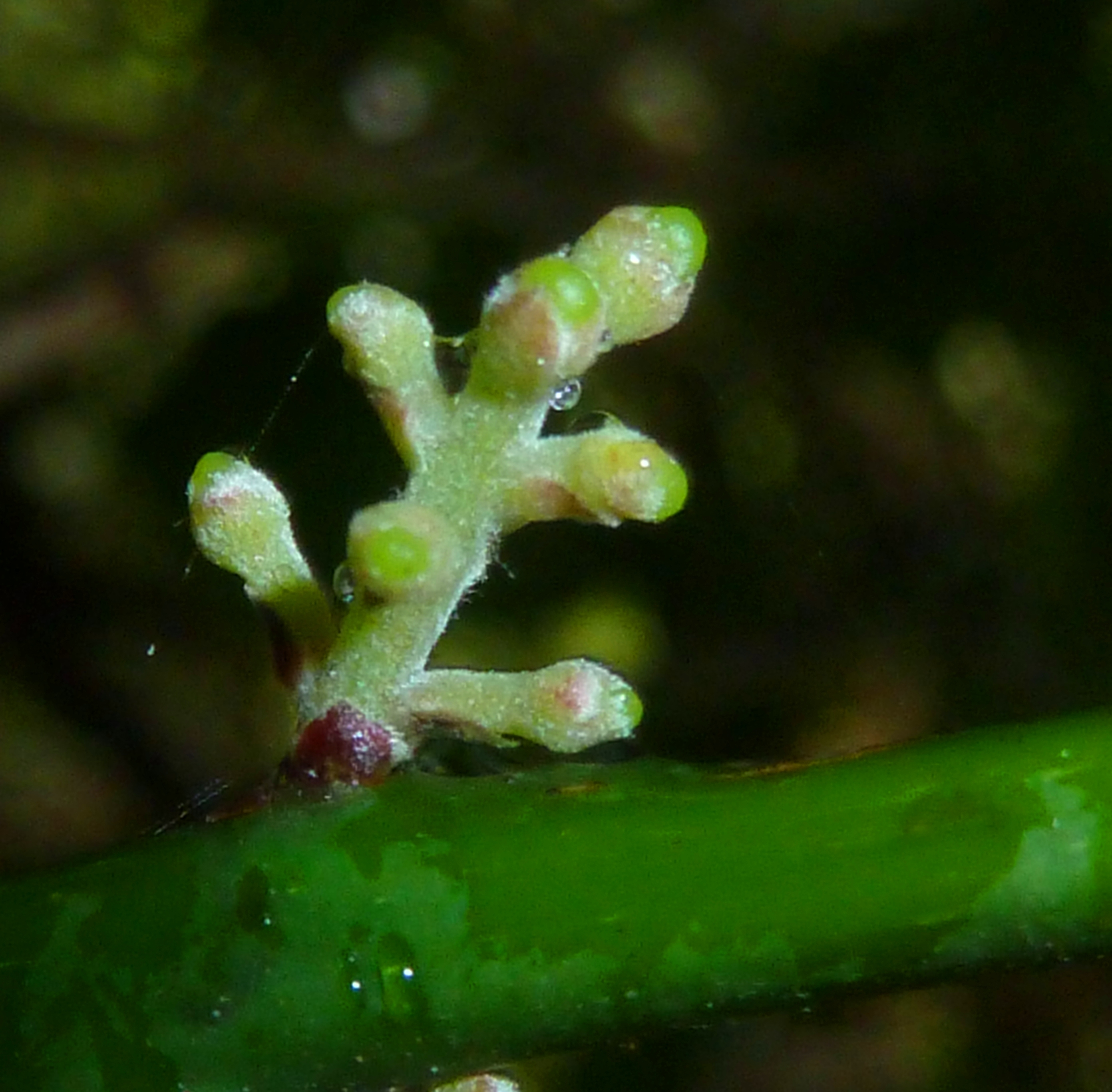
inflorescence

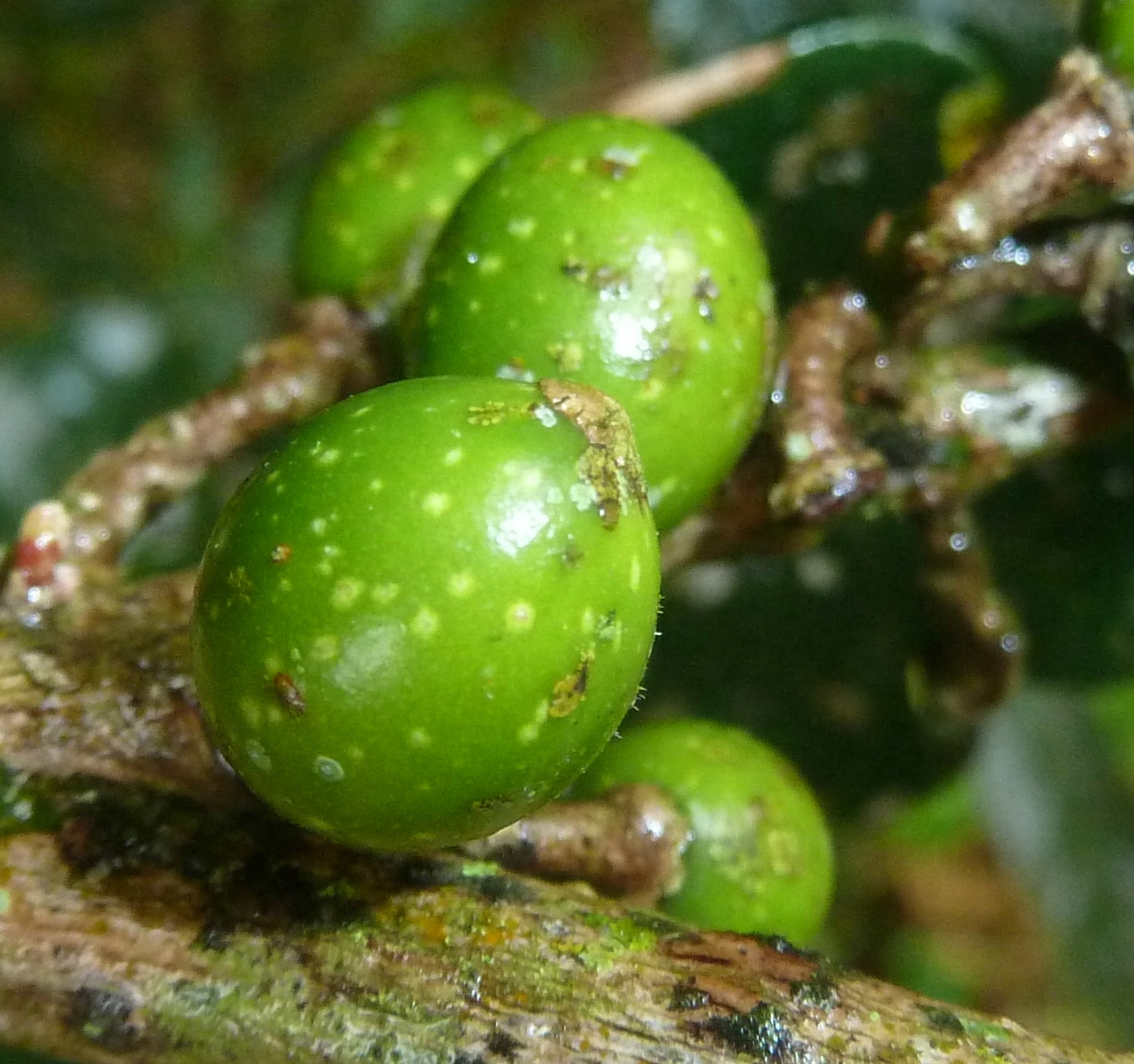
fruit
