= Endressia =

Scientific classification
- Kingdom: Plantae
- Clade: Tracheophytes
- Clade: Angiosperms
- Clade: Eudicots
- Clade: Asterids
- Order: Apiales
- Family: Apiaceae
- Subfamily: Apioideae
- Tribe: Selineae
- Genus: Endressia; J.Gay

Synonyms
- Leuceres Calest.

Genus of flowering plants

Endressia is a genus of flowering plants belonging to the family Apiaceae.

Its native range is eastern Pyrenees in France, to northern Spain.

Known species:

- Endressia castellana Coincy
- Endressia pyrenaica (J.Gay ex DC.) J.Gay

The genus name of Endressia is in honour of Philipp Anton Christoph Endress (1806–1831), a German botanist and plant collector, and it was published in Ann. Sci. Nat. (published in Paris) Vol.26 on page 223 in 1832.
