= Kibara (plant) =

Scientific classification
- Kingdom: Plantae
- Clade: Tracheophytes
- Clade: Angiosperms
- Clade: Magnoliids
- Order: Laurales
- Family: Monimiaceae
- Genus: Kibara; Endl. (1837)

Synonyms
- Brongniartia Blume (1825), nom. illeg.; Sarcodiscus Griff. (1854); Sciadicarpus Hassk. (1842)

Genus of flowering plants

Kibara is a genus of plants in the family Monimiaceae. It includes 47 species native to Indochina, Malesia, and Papuasia.

As of February 2024, Plants of the World Online recognises the following species:

- Kibara archboldiana A.C.Sm.
- Kibara aruensis Becc.
- Kibara buergersiana Perkins
- Kibara bullata Philipson
- Kibara carrii Philipson
- Kibara chimbuensis Philipson
- Kibara coriacea (Blume) Hook.f. & Thomson
- Kibara elmeri Perkins
- Kibara elongata A.C.Sm.
- Kibara ferox Philipson
- Kibara flagelliformis Philipson
- Kibara formicarum Becc.
- Kibara fragrans Philipson
- Kibara fugax Philipson
- Kibara hartleyi Philipson
- Kibara karengana Philipson
- Kibara katikii Philipson
- Kibara kostermansii Philipson
- Kibara latifolia Philipson
- Kibara laurifolia A.C.Sm.
- Kibara leachii Philipson
- Kibara macrantha Philipson
- Kibara microphylla Perkins
- Kibara moluccana Boerl. ex Perkins
- Kibara monticola Perkins
- Kibara myrtoides Perkins
- Kibara neriifolia Perkins
- Kibara nitens Philipson
- Kibara novobritanica Philipson
- Kibara oblongata Philipson
- Kibara obtusa Blume
- Kibara oligocarpella (Kaneh. & Hatus.) Philipson
- Kibara oliviformis Becc.
- Kibara papuana A.C.Sm.
- Kibara perkinsiae K.Schum. & Lauterb.
- Kibara polyantha Perkins
- Kibara rennerae W.N.Takeuchi
- Kibara roemeri (Perkins) Perkins
- Kibara rosselensis Philipson
- Kibara royenii Philipson
- Kibara shungolensis Philipson
- Kibara sleumeri Philipson
- Kibara streimannii Philipson
- Kibara sudestensis Philipson
- Kibara symplocoides Perkins
- Kibara versteeghii Philipson
- Kibara warenensis Kaneh. & Hatus.
