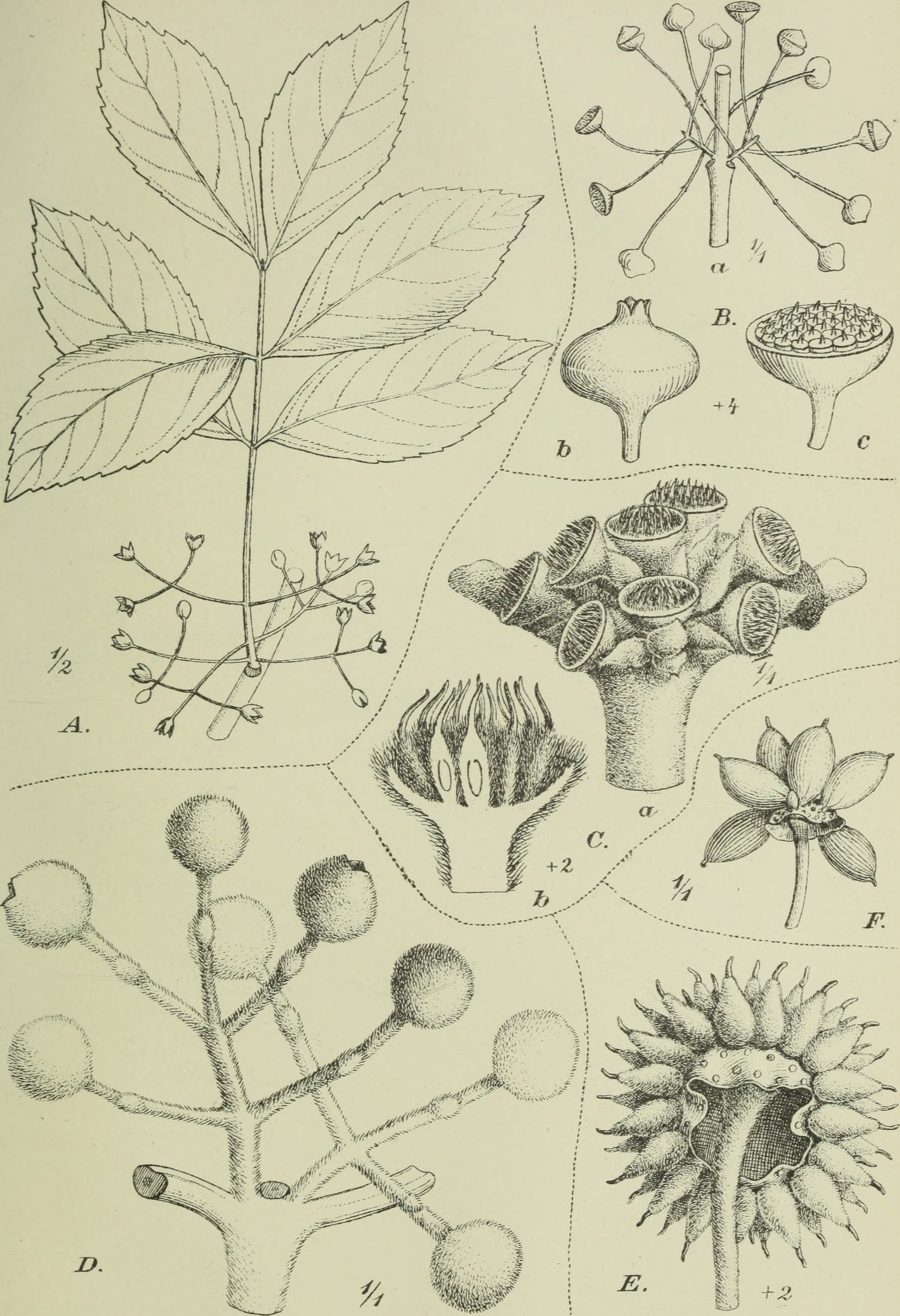
- several Mollinedia species

Scientific classification
- Kingdom: Plantae
- Clade: Tracheophytes
- Clade: Angiosperms
- Clade: Magnoliids
- Order: Laurales
- Family: Monimiaceae
- Genus: Mollinedia; Ruiz & Pav.

Synonyms
- Paracelsia Mart. ex Tul.; Tetratome Poepp. & Endl.

= Mollinedia =

Genus of flowering plants

Mollinedia is a genus of flowering plants in the family Monimiaceae. There are 64 species distributed in the forests of the neotropics, ranging from central Mexico to southern Brazil. They are mainly shrubs and trees.

== Species ==
As of November 2025, Plants of the World Online (POWO) accepts the following 64 species:

- Mollinedia angustata Lundell
- Mollinedia argyrogyna Perkins
- Mollinedia arianeae Lírio & M.Pignal
- Mollinedia boliviensis A.DC.
- Mollinedia boracensis Peixoto
- Mollinedia butleriana Standl.
- Mollinedia calodonta Perkins
- Mollinedia chrysolaena Perkins
- Mollinedia clavigera Tul.
- Mollinedia corcovadensis Perkins
- Mollinedia costaricensis Donn.Sm.
- Mollinedia dolichotricha Lírio & Peixoto
- Mollinedia elegans Tul.
- Mollinedia elliptica A.DC.
- Mollinedia engleriana Perkins
- Mollinedia eugeniifolia Perkins
- Mollinedia fatimae Zavatin & Lírio
- Mollinedia floribunda Tul.
- Mollinedia fruticulosa Perkins
- Mollinedia gilgiana Perkins
- Mollinedia glabra Perkins
- Mollinedia glaziovii Perkins
- Mollinedia grazielae Peixoto
- Mollinedia hatschbachii Peixoto
- Mollinedia heteranthera Perkins
- Mollinedia howeana Perkins
- Mollinedia humboldtiana Aymard
- Mollinedia jorgeorum Peixoto
- Mollinedia killipii J.F.Macbr.
- Mollinedia lamprophylla Perkins
- Mollinedia lanceolata Ruiz & Pav.
- Mollinedia leucantha Molz & D.Silveira
- Mollinedia longicuspidata Perkins
- Mollinedia longifolia Tul.
- Mollinedia lorencei Borges-Lima, Zavatin & Lírio
- Mollinedia lowtheriana Perkins
- Mollinedia luizae Peixoto
- Mollinedia marliae Peixoto & M.Pereira
- Mollinedia maxima J.F.Morales & Grayum
- Mollinedia myriantha Perkins
- Mollinedia oaxacana Lorence
- Mollinedia oligantha Perkins
- Mollinedia organensis Zavatin, Peixoto & Lírio
- Mollinedia ovata Ruiz & Pav.
- Mollinedia pachysandra Perkins
- Mollinedia pallida Lundell
- Mollinedia pfitzeriana Perkins
- Mollinedia pignalii Lírio & M.Pauli
- Mollinedia puberula Perkins
- Mollinedia repanda Ruiz & Pav.
- Mollinedia ruschii Lírio & Peixoto
- Mollinedia salicifolia Perkins
- Mollinedia simulans J.F.Macbr.
- Mollinedia steinbachiana Perkins
- Mollinedia stenophylla Perkins
- Mollinedia tomentosa (Benth.) Tul.
- Mollinedia torresiorum Lorence
- Mollinedia triflora (Spreng.) Tul.
- Mollinedia uleana Perkins
- Mollinedia umbellata (Spreng.) Tul.
- Mollinedia viridiflora Tul.
- Mollinedia widgrenii A.DC.

The Catalogue of Life does not accept the name M. puberula, but does accept the following species in addition to the above list:

- Mollinedia aphanantha Perkins – unplaced by POWO
- Mollinedia dentata Glaziou – not listed by POWO
- Mollinedia estrellensis Tolm. – unplaced by POWO
- Mollinedia marqueteana Peixoto – unplaced by POWO
