= Janet Russell Perkins =

American botanist and explorer (1853–1933)

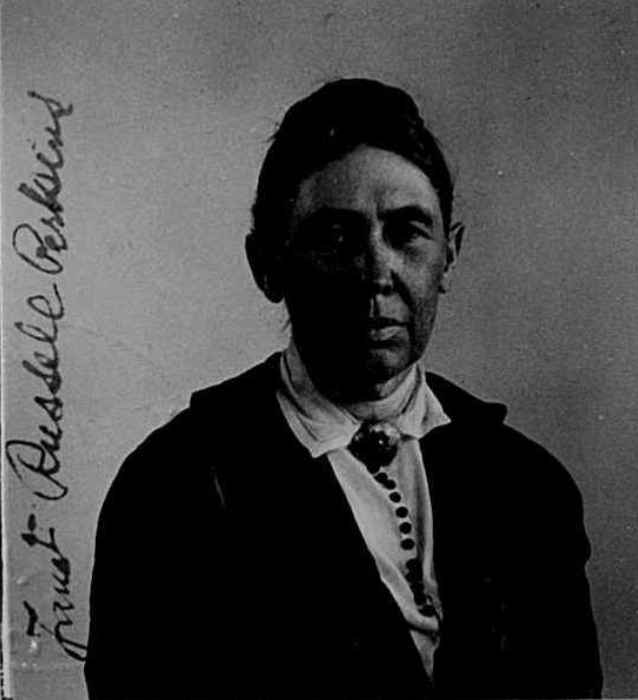
- Born: March 20, 1853; Lafayette, Indiana
- Died: 1933 (aged 79–80); Hinsdale, Illinois
- Education: Ph.D.
- Alma mater: University of Wisconsin; Heidelberg University
- Occupation(s): Botanist, teacher
- Parent(s): Cyrus Grovenor Perkins; Jane Rose Houghteling

Janet Russell Perkins (March 20, 1853 – 1933) was an American-born botanist. Perkins authored 191 land plant species names, the tenth highest number of such names authored by any female scientist.

Born in Lafayette, Indiana, Janet was the daughter of Cyrus Grovenor Perkins and Jane Rose Houghteling. After an early education in private schools, Janet attended the University of Wisconsin, graduating with a B.S. degree in 1872. Travelling to Europe, she was employed as a private tutor in Hildesheim, Germany, and undertook the study of languages and music in Paris, France. In 1875, she returned to the United States, where she was employed as a teacher in Chicago, Illinois for the next twenty years. During this period, she took time off to travel to the Azores, California, and Hawaii.

In 1895 she returned to Germany to study botany. She spent eight semesters studying in Berlin under Adolf Engler and his associates, then transferred to the Heidelberg University where she was awarded a Ph.D. in 1900. Her thesis was titled Eine Monographie der Gattung Mollinedea—a monograph on the genus Mollinedia of flowering plants. Following her graduation, she went back to Berlin and joined the staff of the Royal Botanic Museum, now the Berlin-Dahlem Botanical Garden and Botanical Museum.

Among her published works were various papers on tropical plants. During 1901–1902, she served as a scientific aid to the United States Department of Agriculture in Berlin, where she was engaged in a revision of the Leguminosae of Porto Rico. She spent time in Puerto Rico studying various legume flora. In particular, she discovered many varieties of Phaseolus vulgaris (string bean), just some of which were being cultivated. She also noted that Vigna unguiculata (Cowpea), a bean introduced from Africa, was being cultivated near Yabucoa and Mayagüez. During 1914–1917, she spent time in Jamaica collecting plants, which were presented at the Royal Botanic Gardens, Kew.

== Bibliography ==
The standard author abbreviation Perkins is used to indicate this person as the author when citing a botanical name.

- Beiträge zur Kenntnis der Styracaceae. W. Engelmann, 1902.
- Fragmenta florae philippinae: contributions to the flora of the Philippine Islands. Gebrüder Borntraeger, 1904.
- The Leguminosae of Porto Rico. Contributions from the United States National Herbarium (1907): 133–220.
- Beiträge zur Flora von Bolivia, W. Engelmann, 1912.
- Übersicht über die gattungen der 'Styracaeae'. 1928.
