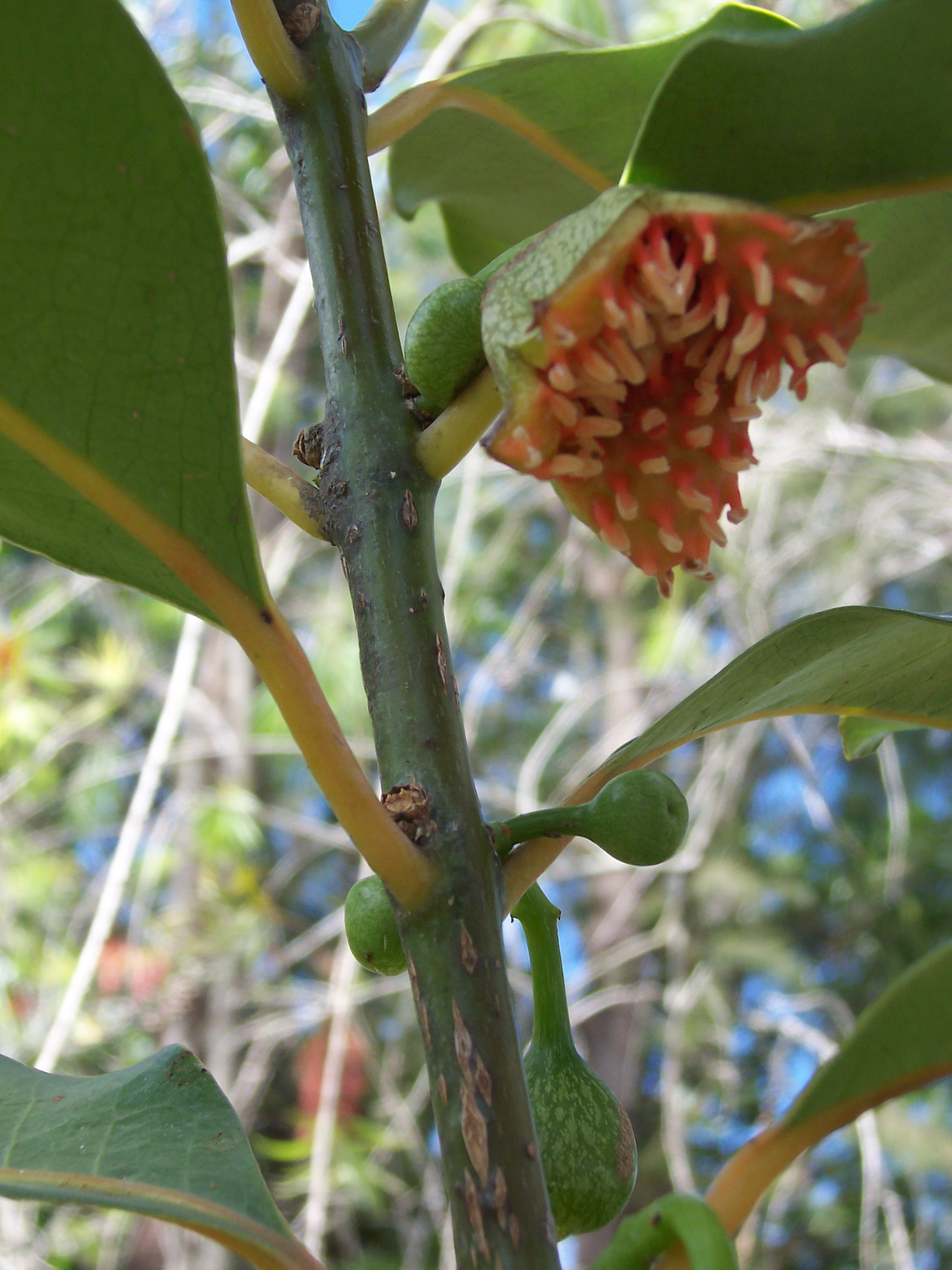
- Male flowers of Tambourissa elliptica

Scientific classification
- Kingdom: Plantae
- Clade: Tracheophytes
- Clade: Angiosperms
- Clade: Magnoliids
- Order: Laurales
- Family: Monimiaceae; Juss.

Genera
- 26 extant, 1 extinct (see text)

= Monimiaceae =

Monimiaceae Temporal range: Santonian - recent

Family of flowering plants

The Monimiaceae is a family of flowering plants in the magnoliid order Laurales. It is closely related to the families Hernandiaceae and Lauraceae. It consists of shrubs, small trees, and a few lianas of the tropics and subtropics, mostly in the southern hemisphere. The largest center of diversity is New Guinea, with about 75 species. Lesser centres of diversity are Madagascar, Australia, and the neotropics. Africa has one species, Xymalos monospora, as does Southern Chile (Peumus boldus). Several species are distributed through Malesia and the southwest Pacific.

The Monimiaceae are underrepresented in herbaria and other plant collections. Variation within the family has not been understood, resulting in an unusual proportion of monospecific genera. As of 2010, these 11 genera were considered monospecific: Peumus, Xymalos, Kibaropsis, Austromatthaea, Hemmantia, Pendressia, Hennecartia, Macrotorus, Macropeplus, Grazielanthus, and Faika. Kairoa was thought to be monospecific until 2009.

The Monimiaceae include 24 genera with a total of about 217 known species. The largest genera and the number of their constituent species is: Tambourissa (50), Mollinedia (20-90), Kibara (43), Steganthera (17), Palmeria (14), and Hedycarya (11). The type genus, Monimia, is endemic to the Mascarenes.

The number of species in the Monimiaceae has been variously estimated from about 200 to about 270. Most of this difference results from uncertainty over species limits in the tropical American genus Mollinedia. Estimates of the number of species in Mollinedia have ranged from 20 to 90. Janet Russell Perkins and Ernest Friedrich Gilg described 71 species of Mollinedia in Das Pflanzenreich in 1901, but many authors today regard this as an example of overdescription.

The wood of Peumus boldus and Hedycarya arborea is used locally, in Chile and New Zealand, respectively, but is of no commercial importance. Both of these species are grown in their native regions as ornamentals. An herbal tea is made from Peumus.

The phytochemistry of a few of the genera has been studied.

Fossil wood attributed to the Monimiaceae has been found in the Eastern Cape Province of South Africa and on James Ross Island, Antarctica. Both of these fossil sites are roughly 83 million years old, from the Campanian stage of the Cretaceous period. Fossil leaves of the Monimiaceae are known from the Paleocene of King George Island of the South Shetland Islands, near the Antarctic Peninsula and from the Eocene of Patagonia.

Divergence of different groups within Monimiaceae was long believed to be explained by the separation of East Gondwana (India, Sri Lanka, Madagascar, the Seychelles, Australia, Antarctica, and New Caledonia) from West Gondwana (Africa and South America), and by the later separation of Africa and South America. The family Monimiaceae was long considered to be one of the best examples of vicariance, but the dating of clades by molecular clock methods has shown that the presence of the Monimiaceae in Africa and South America can be explained only by long-distance dispersal. Antarctica had coastal forests as recently as the mid-Miocene, and these could have provided an intermediate phase in dispersal between Australia and South America.

== Genera ==
The information on genera is from Renner et al. (2010) or, when not available there, from Philipson (1993).

- Monimiaceae
  - Monimioideae
  - - Hortonioideae
    - Mollinedioideae

- Subfamily Monimioideae
    - Genus Monimia Thouars, 1804 – 3 species; Mauritius and Réunion.
    - Genus Palmeria F.Muell., 1864 – 17 species; New Guinea to Sulawesi and eastern Australia.
    - Genus Peumus Molina, 1782 – 1 species; southern Chile.
- Subfamily Hortonioideae
    - Genus Hortonia Wight ex Arn., 1838 – 3 species; Sri Lanka.
- Subfamily Mollinedioideae
  - Tribe Hedycaryeae
    - Genus Decarydendron Danguy, 1928 – 4 species; Madagascar.
    - Genus Ephippiandra Decaisne, 1858 – 7 species; Madagascar.
    - Genus Hedycarya J.R.Forst. & G.Forst., 1776 – 16 species; mostly of New Caledonia, also New Zealand, and Australia to Fiji.
    - Genus †Hedycaryoxylon – 1 species
    - Genus Kibaropsis Vieill. ex Jérémie, 1977 – 1 species; New Caledonia.
    - Genus Levieria Becc., 1877 – 7 species; Queensland, New Guinea to Sulawesi.
    - Genus Tambourissa Sonn., 1782 – approximately 50 species; Madagascar and the Mascarene Islands.
  - Tribe Mollinedieae
    - Genus Austromatthaea L.S.Smith, 1969 – 1 species; Queensland.
    - Genus Grazielanthus Peixoto & Per.-Moura, 2008 – 1 species; southeast Brazil.
    - Genus Hemmantia Whiffin, 2007 – 1 species; Queensland.
    - Genus Hennecartia Poiss., 1885 – 1 species; Paraguay, southern Brazil, northeast Argentina.
    - Genus Kairoa Philipson, 1980 – 4 species; New Guinea.
    - Genus Kibara Endl., 1837 – 47 species; mostly New Guinea, but extending from the Nicobar Islands and Thailand to the Philippines and Queensland.
    - Genus Lauterbachia Perkins, 1900 – 1 species; Papua New Guinea.
    - Genus Macropeplus Perkins, 1898 – 4 species; Brazil.
    - Genus Macrotorus Perkins, 1898 – 2 species; Brazil.
    - Genus Matthaea Blume, 1856 – 6 species; Philippines, Talaud Islands, Malaysia, and Sumatra.
    - Genus Mollinedia Ruiz & Pav., 1794 – 62 species; Central and South America
    - Genus Parakibara Philipson, 1985 – 1 species; Halmahera.
    - Genus Pendressia Whiffin, 2018 – 1 species; Queensland.
    - Genus Steganthera Perkins, 1898 – 28 species; Sulawesi to Solomon Islands and Queensland.
    - Genus Wilkiea F.Muell., 1858 – 12 species; New South Wales, Queensland, New Guinea.
    - Genus Xymalos Baill., 1887 – 1 species; Africa

== History ==
The family Monimiaceae was erected in 1809 by Antoine Laurent de Jussieu. He called it "[the] order Monimieae", but the orders of that time were equivalent to what are now called families. He defined the family broadly, to include what are now called the Siparunaceae and Atherospermataceae, as well as the modern Monimiaceae. This circumscription of the family prevailed until the 1990s, but some, such as Robert Brown and John Lindley, recognized the Atherospermataceae as a separate family.

Jussieu used the now-obsolete genus names Ruizia, Ambora, Citrosma, and Pavonia (sensu Ruiz & Pavón). These are now known as Peumus, Tambourissa, Siparuna, and Laurelia, respectively. Jussieu was apparently unaware that Antonio José Cavanilles had published the name Pavonia in 1786 for a genus in the Malvaceae. Later authors replaced the name Ruizia with Boldea, until it was eventually determined that Peumus is the correct name for this genus.

In 1855, Louis-René Tulasne wrote two landmark papers on the Monimiaceae. Using current names, the genera that he recognized were: Peumus, Monimia, Tambourissa, Hedycarya, Mollinedia, Kibara, Siparuna, Atherosperma, Laurelia, and Doryphora.

In 1898, Janet Russell Perkins began a series of articles on the Monimiaceae, but only two were ever completed. The second of these was mistitled as part III on its first page (compare to table of contents therein) and covers the genus Siparuna, which is now grouped with Glossocalyx in the family Siparunaceae.

The first in this series covers the tribe Mollinedieae, but begins with an extensive discussion of the family. Perkins defined the family very broadly, to include Amborella, Trimenia, and Piptocalyx. These are now regarded as basal angiosperms, and Piptocalyx is a segregate of Trimenia. Perkins also included the genus Conuleum, but it is now usually treated in Siparuna because it is monospecific and sister to Siparuna.

In this paper, Perkins named five new genera: Macropeplus, Macrotorus, Steganthera, Tetrasynandra, and Anthobembix. The genus Anthobembix consisted of two species that Perkins had transferred from Kibara. In 1942, these were transferred to Steganthera. The genus Lauterbachia was named by Perkins in a flora published in 1901.

A comprehensive treatment of the Monimiaceae was published by Perkins and Ernest Friedrich Gilg in Das Pflanzenreich in 1901. In the part of their family that is still in the Monimiaceae, 20 genera were recognized, including Anthobembix. They placed Conuleum in synonymy under Siparuna and added four genera to those listed by Perkins in 1898. The new genera were Xymalos, Wilkiea, Lauterbachia, and Chloropatane.

The genus Chloropatane had been described by H.G. Adolf Engler in 1899. It was based on a specimen that was eventually shown to be a species of Erythrococca (Euphorbiaceae), but it is too fragmentary to be more precisely identified.

The family was reviewed again by Lillian L. Money et al. in 1950.

The most recent monograph of the Monimiaceae was written by William Raymond Philipson in 1993 in a series entitled The Families and Genera of Vascular Plants. Philipson divided the Monimiaceae into six subfamilies: Glossocalycoideae, Siparunoideae, Atherospermatoideae, Monimioideae, Hortonioideae, and Mollinedioideae. The latter three constitute the Monimiaceae as defined in the APG III system, which was published in 2009. In these three subfamilies, Philipson recognized a total of 25 genera. He did not accept Anthobembix, but he did include the other 19 genera from the 1901 monograph by Perkins and Gilg. He also included six genera that had been published after Perkins and Gilg (1901): Decarydendron, Kibaropsis, Austromatthaea, Kairoa, Faika, and Parakibara. The latter three had been named by Philipson in the 1980s.

After Philipson's treatment of the Monimiaceae, the genera Hemmantia and "Endressia" were published in 2007 in Flora of Australia. Grazielanthus was published in 2008 in Kew Bulletin. The name "Endressia" (sensu Whiffin) is now known to be illegitimate because Jaques Étienne Gay had published the name Endressia for a genus in the Apiaceae in 1832. Endressia is related to Angelica and Selinum in the tribe Selineae.

Molecular phylogenetic studies of the angiosperms and of Laurales had only sparsely sampled the Monimiaceae until 2010. In that year, and in 2014, phylogenies were produced that were based on much denser sampling. These have shown that the next revision of the family must make substantial changes to the genera.

== Classification ==
From the time that the family Monimiaceae was established by Jussieu in 1809, until it was monographed by Philipson in 1993, it was usually circumscribed to include three distinct groups in the Laurales, which are recognized in the APG III system as the separate families Siparunaceae, Atherospermataceae, and Monimiaceae sensu stricto. The inclusion of Amborella and Trimenia was always doubtful and was rejected by many. Their exclusion from the Monimiaceae was well established by the time Philipson wrote his treatise on the family.

Beginning with the ground-breaking paper by Mark W. Chase and many coauthors in 1993, the cladistic analysis of DNA sequences has contributed much to the knowledge of angiosperm phylogeny. By the end of the 1990s, it was evident that the traditional circumscription of Monimiaceae was paraphyletic over the monotypic family Gomortegaceae, and possibly polyphyletic, as well, because the major part of it formed a clade with the Hernandiaceae and Lauraceae.

Among the Hernandiaceae, Monimiaceae, and Lauraceae, the question of which two are most closely related has been remarkably difficult to answer. Different studies have yielded different results, but none with strong statistical support. This is surprising, as the Hernandiaceae and Lauraceae are much closer to each other morphologically than either of them is to the Monimiaceae.

== Systematics ==
In 1993, Philipson divided the subfamily Mollinedioideae into three tribes: Hedycaryeae, Mollinedieae, and Hennecartieae. The Hennecartieae consisted of a single species: Hennecartia omphalandra. It is now known that Hennecartia is nested within the Mollinedieae and is sister to a clade consisting of the rest of the neotropical Monimiaceae. The family Mollinedieae is strongly supported as monophyletic if Hennecartia is included.

The monophyly of the Hedycaryeae is not supported or rejected by either of the recent molecular phylogenetic studies. One study resolved Xymalos as sister to the rest of the Mollinedioideae, but this result had only weak maximum likelihood bootstrap support.

In the next revision of the Monimiaceae, several genera will need to be recircumscribed or placed in synonymy with others. Tetrasynandra and Grazielanthus are embedded within Steganthera and Mollinedia, respectively. Kibaropsis forms a clade with Hedycarya arborea, the type species of Hedycarya. The monophyly of Levieria is questionable, but only one species has been sampled for DNA. Levieria acuminata is nested within Hedycarya. Wilkiea, meanwhile, is polyphyletic and should be divided into at least three genera. The type species, W. calyptrocalyx, is now regarded as a synonym of Wilkiea huegeliana, and the latter is placed by some authors in synonymy with Wilkiea macrophylla.

== Sources ==
- Philipson, W. R., 1987. A classification of the Monimiaceae. Nordic Journal of Botany 7: 25–29.
