= Siparuna lozaniana =

Conservation status
- Vulnerable (IUCN 3.1)

Scientific classification
- Kingdom: Plantae
- Clade: Tracheophytes
- Clade: Angiosperms
- Clade: Magnoliids
- Order: Laurales
- Family: Siparunaceae
- Genus: Siparuna
- Species: S. lozaniana

Binomial name
- Siparuna lozaniana S.S.Renner & Hausner (2000)

Species of tree

Siparuna lozaniana is an evergreen dioecious shrub which usually grows to 8 m in height (exceptionally to 16 m). It is native to the Andes of central Colombia, where it grows in montane rain forest from 900 to 3,000 metres elevation. It can be distinguished from Colombian congeners such as Siparuna calantha and Siparuna petiolaris by the combination of leathery oblanceolate or obovate leaves and smooth rather than spiny fruits.
