= Siparuna multiflora =

Conservation status
- Near Threatened (IUCN 3.1)

Scientific classification
- Kingdom: Plantae
- Clade: Tracheophytes
- Clade: Angiosperms
- Clade: Magnoliids
- Order: Laurales
- Family: Siparunaceae
- Genus: Siparuna
- Species: S. multiflora

Binomial name
- Siparuna multiflora S.S.Renner & Hausner

Species of flowering plant

Siparuna multiflora is a species of flowering plant in the Siparunaceae family. It is a tree endemic to Ecuador, where it grows in lowland and montane rain forest up to 1,500 metres elevation.
