= Siparuna vasqueziana =

Conservation status
- Vulnerable (IUCN 3.1)

Scientific classification
- Kingdom: Plantae
- Clade: Tracheophytes
- Clade: Angiosperms
- Clade: Magnoliids
- Order: Laurales
- Family: Siparunaceae
- Genus: Siparuna
- Species: S. vasqueziana

Binomial name
- Siparuna vasqueziana S.S.Renner & Hausner 2000

Species of shrub

Siparuna vasqueziana is an evergreen dioecious shrub which grows to 5 m in height. It is found in lowland and premontane primary rain forest in Amazonian Peru. It can be distinguished from all other Siparuna species by its yellow flowers with exceptionally long tepals.
