= Siparuna gentryana =

Conservation status
- Least Concern (IUCN 3.1)

Scientific classification
- Kingdom: Plantae
- Clade: Tracheophytes
- Clade: Angiosperms
- Clade: Magnoliids
- Order: Laurales
- Family: Siparunaceae
- Genus: Siparuna
- Species: S. gentryana

Binomial name
- Siparuna gentryana S.S.Renner 2000

Species of tree

Siparuna gentryana is an evergreen monoecious tree which grows to 20 m in height. It is native to the Pacific lowlands and western slopes of the Andes in western Ecuador and western Colombia, where it grows in primary lowland and montane rain forests up to 1,200 metres elevation. It is similar to the more widespread Siparuna cristata but can be distinguished by its much smaller fruits which are spiny rather than smooth.
