= Siparuna guajalitensis =

Conservation status
- Least Concern (IUCN 3.1)

Scientific classification
- Kingdom: Plantae
- Clade: Tracheophytes
- Clade: Angiosperms
- Clade: Magnoliids
- Order: Laurales
- Family: Siparunaceae
- Genus: Siparuna
- Species: S. guajalitensis

Binomial name
- Siparuna guajalitensis S.S.Renner & Hausner

Species of flowering plant

Siparuna guajalitensis is a species of flowering plant in the Siparunaceae family. It is a shrub native to the Pacific lowlands and western slopes of the Andes in western Colombia and western Ecuador, where it grows in lowland and montane rain forests from 200 to 2,400 metres elevation.
