= A. germanus =

A. germanus may refer to:

- Abacetus germanus, a ground beetle
- Adhemarius germanus or Amplypterus germanus, synonyms of Adhemarius gannascus, a moth found in the Americas
- Amblyornis germanus, the Huon bowerbird, found in New Guinea
- Aviculopecten germanus, a prehistoric mollusc
