= Siparuna cascada =

Conservation status
- Vulnerable (IUCN 3.1)

Scientific classification
- Kingdom: Plantae
- Clade: Tracheophytes
- Clade: Angiosperms
- Clade: Magnoliids
- Order: Laurales
- Family: Siparunaceae
- Genus: Siparuna
- Species: S. cascada

Binomial name
- Siparuna cascada S.S.Renner & Hausner

Species of flowering plant

Siparuna cascada is a species of plant in the Siparunaceae family. It is endemic to Ecuador.
