= Siparuna campii =

Conservation status
- Endangered (IUCN 3.1)

Scientific classification
- Kingdom: Plantae
- Clade: Embryophytes
- Clade: Tracheophytes
- Clade: Spermatophytes
- Clade: Angiosperms
- Clade: Magnoliids
- Order: Laurales
- Family: Siparunaceae
- Genus: Siparuna
- Species: S. campii

Binomial name
- Siparuna campii S.S.Renner & Hausner

Species of flowering plant

Siparuna campii is a species of flowering plant in the Siparunaceae family. It is a tree endemic to Ecuador.
