= Aiouea lehmannii =

Conservation status
- Endangered (IUCN 3.1)

Scientific classification
- Kingdom: Plantae
- Clade: Tracheophytes
- Clade: Angiosperms
- Clade: Magnoliids
- Order: Laurales
- Family: Lauraceae
- Genus: Aiouea
- Species: A. lehmannii

Binomial name
- Aiouea lehmannii (O.C.Schmidt) Renner

Synonyms
- Aniba granatensis (Mez) Kosterm.; Aniba lehmannii O.C.Schmidt; Nectandra granatensis Mez

Species of flowering plant

Aiouea lehmannii is a species of flowering plant in the family Lauraceae. It is native to western Colombia and possibly northeastern Brazil.
