= Siparuna eggersii =

Conservation status
- Endangered (IUCN 3.1)

Scientific classification
- Kingdom: Plantae
- Clade: Tracheophytes
- Clade: Angiosperms
- Clade: Magnoliids
- Order: Laurales
- Family: Siparunaceae
- Genus: Siparuna
- Species: S. eggersii

Binomial name
- Siparuna eggersii Hieron.

Synonyms
- Siparuna fuchsiifolia Standl.; Siparuna mexiae Sleumer

Species of shrub

Siparuna eggersii is a scrambling, large shrub in the Siparunaceae family. It is endemic to Ecuador, where it is endangered due to habitat destruction. It has glabrous leaves and fig-like, red fruit with a lemon scent.
