= Aiouea alainii =

Conservation status
- Endangered (IUCN 3.1)

Scientific classification
- Kingdom: Plantae
- Clade: Tracheophytes
- Clade: Angiosperms
- Clade: Magnoliids
- Order: Laurales
- Family: Lauraceae
- Genus: Aiouea
- Species: A. alainii

Binomial name
- Aiouea alainii (C.K.Allen) R.Rohde (2017)

Synonyms
- Cinnamomum alainii (C.K.Allen) Alain (1982); Phoebe alainii C.K.Allen (1971)

Genus of flowering plants

Aiouea alainii is a species of tree in the laurel family (Lauraceae). It is endemic to the Dominican Republic.
