= Amaro Macedo =

Brazilian botanist

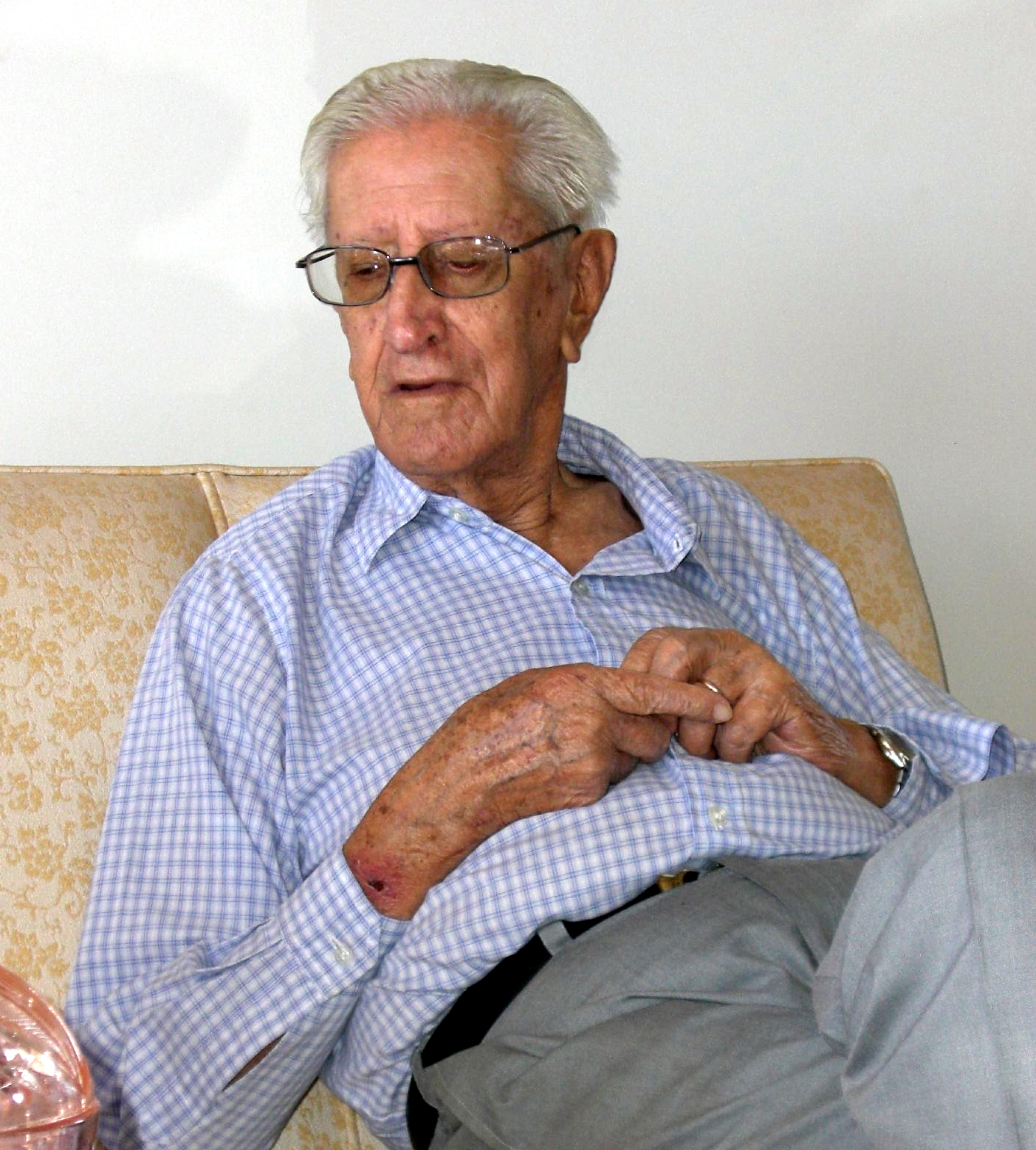
- Amaro Macedo (2007)
- Born: 10 May 1914; Campina Verde, Brazil
- Died: 27 June 2014 (aged 100)
- Known for: Collector of the Brazilian Cerrado plant species
- Scientific career
- Fields: Botany
- Author abbrev. (botany): A.Macedo

Amaro Macedo (10 May 1914 – 27 June 2014) was a Brazilian botanist who was the best-known collector of the Brazilian Cerrado plant species of the 20th century. He lived in Ituiutaba, in the state of Minas Gerais, Brazil. He started his collection in 1943 when he was a teacher of natural sciences in the Instituto Marden, Ituiutaba. He collected most of his plant material in the Cerrado vegetation of the states of Minas Gerais, Goiás, Maranhão and Pará. He collected also in the regions of the villages of Natividade, Porto Nacional and Filadelfia, at the time part of the state of Goiás, although now part of the state of Tocantins. Plant specimens from his collection are in several herbaria in Brazil and outside. Between 1943 and 2007 he collected 6,008 plant specimens, several of them are considered new species and some were named for him by fellow botanists.

== Biography ==
Macedo, the son of Otavio Macedo, a farmer from the Triângulo Mineiro in the State of Minas Gerais (MG), and Maria da Gloria Chaves Macedo, was married to Celia Duarte Macedo. The couple had four daughters: Regina, Marilia, Beatriz and Maria do Carmo. He was born Campina Verde, Brazil and attended primary school in Ituiutaba and secondary school in Campanha, Minas Gerais. Afterwards he was a student at the Escola Superior de Viçosa, now known as the Universidade Federal de Viçosa (Federal University of Viçosa) - UFV, Minas Gerais, as a technician in agriculture. In 1935 he moved to Ituiutaba, MG, to teach primary school classes at the new Instituto Marden. Soon he was teaching mathematics, sciences and technical design in the secondary classes of the same Institute. He was a teacher of statistics at the Commerce School and was responsible for the administration of the Instituto Marden when his brother-in-law was on leave. At the time he was also responsible for the classes of mathematics and sciences at the Colegio Santa Tereza, a Roman Catholic school run by nuns in Ituiutaba. As a teacher of Natural Sciences he had to teach the scientific names of common plant species; since his pupils were for the most part sons of farmers from the region and they were particularly interested to know the Latin names of the plants that were growing on their farms. He had to study to learn this subject and decided also to have field classes with his students.

He wrote to well-known botanists in Brazil asking for help in how to collect and prepare plant specimens. He collected most of his plant material in the cerrado vegetation of the States of Minas Gerais, Goiás, Maranhão and Pará. He collected also in the regions of the villages of Natividade, Porto Nacional and Filadelfia, at the time part of the State of Goiás, although now part of the state of Tocantins. His first plant specimen was collected on May 3, 1943, in Ituiutaba – Roupala tomentosa Pohl. He travelled all over the cerrado region and wrote diaries of his trips in which he describes the plants, the environment, the villages, the customs of the people, the food, the transport, the rivers and so on. When he retired from teaching, he started a new life as a farmer, but continued collecting plant material. One day collecting material in the farm he was struck by a branch of Bauhinia bongardi Steud. which left him totally blind of his left eye.

== Tributes ==
He has a mention from the British Museum of Natural History for his work with the Brazilian flora. In 1958 he received a medal, Medalha de Mérito Dom João VI, from the Brazilian government for his services to the Rio de Janeiro Botanical Garden.

== Exchanges with well-known botanists ==
He learned from and kept an exchange of correspondence with Brazilian botanists, such as Joaquim Franco de Toledo, Oswaldo Handro, Frederico Carlos Hoehne, Graziela Maciel Barroso, Carlos de Toledo Rizzini, Alexandre Curt Brade, Guido Frederico João Pabst, Gil Martins Felippe, and Lúcia Rossi e João Aguiar Nogueira Batista. He also was in frequent touch with botanists outside Brazil, such as Carlos M.D.E. Legrand, from Uruguay, Lorenzo R. Parodi and Arturo E. Burkart, from Argentina, Harold N. Moldenke, Richard Sumner Cowan, Robert E. Woodson Jr., Conrad V. Morton, Jason R. Swallen, and Lyman B. Smith, from the United States, Noel Y. Sandwith, from England, Joseph V. Monachino, an Italian working in the United States, and Erik Asplund, from Sweden.

== Plant specimens ==
Plant specimens from his collection are all over herbaria of Brazil and outside. In 1963 he donated a herbarium of 1,723 plant specimens to the Instituto de Botânica de São Paulo. Between 1943 and 2007 he collected 6,008 plant specimens, several of them are considered new species and some were named after him by fellow botanists.

== New species collected by Macedo ==
Acanthaceae

- Amphiscopia grandis Rizzini
- Chaetothylax erenthemanthus Rizzini
- Chaetothylax tocantinus var longispicus Rizzini
- Hygrophila humistrata Rizzini
- Lophothecium paniculatum Rizzini
- Ruellia capitata Rizzini
- Ruellia rufipila Rizzini

Amaryllidaceae

- Amaryllis minasgerais H.P. Traub

Asclepiadaceae

- Ditassa maranhensis Fontella & C. Valente

Bignoniaceae

- Distictella dasytricha Sandwith

Bromeliaceae

- Bromelia interior L.B. Smith

Compositae

- Gochnatia barrosii Cabrera
- Tricogonia atenuata G.M.Barroso

Connaraceae

- Rourea psammophila E. Forero

Gramineae

- Luziola divergens J.R. Swallen
- Olyra taquara Swallen
- Panicum pirineosense Swallen
- Paspalum crispulum Swallen
- Paspalum fessum Swallen
- Paspalum formosum Swallen
- Paspalum latipes Swallen
- Paspalum pallens Swallen
- Sporobolus hians van Schaack

Labiatae

- Hyptis argentea Epling & Mathias
- Salvia expansa Epling

Liliaceae

- Herreria latifolia Woodson

Melastomataceae

- Rhynchanthera philadelphensis Brade

Velloziaceae

- Vellozia hypoxoides L.B. Smith

== New species dedicated to Amaro Macedo ==
Acanthaceae

- Sericographis macedoana Rizzini — Arch. Jard. Bot. Rio de Janeiro 8; 357, 1948

Aspidiaceae

- Polybotrya macedoi Brade — Bradea l: 24, 1969

Bromeliaceae

- Bromelia macedoi L.B.Sm. — Buli. Bromeliad Soe. 8: 12, 1958
- Dyckia macedoi L.B.Sm. — Arch. Bot. São Paulo n. ser. 2: 195, 1952

Compositae

- Mikania macedoi G.M.Barroso — Arch. Jard. Bot. Rio de Janeiro 16: 247, 1959
- Vernonia macedoi G.M.Barroso — Arch. Jard. Bot. Rio de Janeiro 13: 9, 1954
- Wedelia macedoi H.Rob. — Phytologia 55:396, 1984

Convolvulaceae

- Ipomoea macedoi Hoehne — Arq. Bot. Estado São Paulo n s. 2: 110, 1950

Dryopteridaceae

- Polybotrya macedoi Brade — Bradea 1: 24, 1969

Gramineae

- Paspatum macedoi Swallen — Phytologia 14: 377, 1967

Lauraceae

- Aiouea macedoana Vattimo-Gil — Anais 15 Congr. Soc. Bot. Brasil 168, 1967

Leguminosae–Caesalpinioideae

- Cassia macedoi H.S.Irwin &. Barneby — Mem. New York Bot. Gard, 30; 136,1978
- Chamaecrista macedoi (H.S.Irwin & Barneby) H.S.Irwin & Barneby — Mem. New York Bot. Gard. 35: 654,1982

Leguminosae–Mimosoideae

- Mimosa macedoana Burkart — Darwiniana 13: 389,1964

Leguminosae–Papilionoideae

- Arachis macedoi Krapov. & W.C.Greg. — Bonplandia (Corrientes) 8: 55, 1994
- Harpalyce macedoi R.S.Cowan — Brittonia 10: 31,1958

Malpighiaceae

- Banisteriopsis macedoana L.B.Sm. — J. Wash. Acad. Sci. 45: 198, 1955
- Stigmaphyllon macedoanum C. E. Anderson — Contr. Univ. Michigan Herb. 17: 10, 1990

Malvaceae

- Peltaea macedoi Krapov. & Cristobal —Kurtziana 2:196, 1965

Melastomataceae

- Macairea macedoi Brade — Arch. Jard. Bot. Rio de Janeiro 16: 31, 1959
- Microlicía amaroi Brade — Arch. Jard. Bot. Rio de Janeiro 16:29, 1959
- Microlicia macedoi L.B.Sm. & Wurdack — J. Wash. Acad. Sci. 45: 200, 1955
- Tococa macedoi Brade — Arch. Jard. Bot. Rio de Janeiro 16: 32, 1959

Myrtaceae

- Eugenia macedoi Mattos & D.Legrand — Loefgrenia 67: 24,1975
- Hexachlamys macedoi D.Legrand — Loefgrenia 55: 1, 1972
- Marlierea macedoi D.Legrand —Bot. Mus. Hist. Nat. Montevideo, 3: 27, 1962
- Psidium macedoi Kausel — Lilloa 33: 108, 1971 (publ.1972)

Ochnaceae

- Luxemburgia macedoi Dwyer — J. Wash. Acad. Sci. 45: 198, 1955

Onagraceae

- Pelozia macedoi Krapov. & Cristóbal — Kurtziana 2: 196, 1965

Opiliaceae

- Agonandra macedoi Toledo — Arch. Bot. São Paulo n.s. 3:13, 1952

Orchidaceae

- Cyrtopodium macedoi J.A.N.Bat. & Bianch. — Novon 16: 17, 2006

Piperaceae

- Peperomia macedoana Yunck. — Bol. Inst. Bot. (São Paulo) 3:189, 1966
- Piper macedoi Yunck. — Boi. Inst. Bot. (São Paulo) 3: 51, 1966

Polypodiaceae

- Pecluma macedoi (Brade) M.KessIer &. A.R.Sm. — Candollea 60: 281, 2005
- Polypodium macedoi Brade — Arch. Jard. Bot. Rio de Janeiro 11: 30, 1951

Rubiaceae

- Galianthe macedoi E.L.Cabral — Bonplandia (Corrientes) 10:121, 2000

Rutaceae

- Teclea macedoi Exell & Mendonça — Garcia de Orta. Ser. Bot. 1: 93, 1973
- Vepris macedoi (Exell &. Mendonça) W.Mziray —Symb. Bot. Upsal. 30: 73, 1992

Velloziaceae

- Vellozia macedonis Woodson— Ann. Missouri Bot. Gard. 37: 398, 1950

Verbenaceae

- Lippia macedoi Moldenke — Phytologia 6: 327, 1958
- Stachytarpheta macedoi Moldenke — Phytologia 3: 276, 1950

Viscaceae

- Phoradendron macedonis Rizzini — Rodriguesia 18-19: 163, 1956
