= Damburneya rudis =

Conservation status
- Vulnerable (IUCN 3.1)

Scientific classification
- Kingdom: Plantae
- Clade: Tracheophytes
- Clade: Angiosperms
- Clade: Magnoliids
- Order: Laurales
- Family: Lauraceae
- Genus: Damburneya
- Species: D. rudis

Binomial name
- Damburneya rudis (C.K.Allen) Trofimov & Rohwer

Synonyms
- Nectandra rudis C.K.Allen

Species of plant

Damburneya rudis is a species of flowering plant in the family Lauraceae. It is a tree native to El Salvador, Guatemala, Honduras, and the Mexican state of Chiapas. It is native to montane rain forest from 1,600 to 2,500 metres elevation.
