= Siparuna calantha =

Conservation status
- Least Concern (IUCN 3.1)

Scientific classification
- Kingdom: Plantae
- Clade: Tracheophytes
- Clade: Angiosperms
- Clade: Magnoliids
- Order: Laurales
- Family: Siparunaceae
- Genus: Siparuna
- Species: S. calantha

Binomial name
- Siparuna calantha (Perkins) S.S.Renner & Hausner (2000)

Synonyms
- Siparuna riparia var. calantha Perkins (1927)

Species of shrub

Siparuna calantha is an evergreen dioecious shrub which grows to around 10 m in height. It is found only in the Sierra Nevada de Santa Marta in Colombia. It is similar to Siparuna petiolaris but differs in having much broader leaves.
