= Damburneya parvissima =

Conservation status
- Endangered (IUCN 3.1)

Scientific classification
- Kingdom: Plantae
- Clade: Tracheophytes
- Clade: Angiosperms
- Clade: Magnoliids
- Order: Laurales
- Family: Lauraceae
- Genus: Damburneya
- Species: D. parvissima

Binomial name
- Damburneya parvissima (Lundell) Trofimov

Synonyms
- Aiouea parvissima (Lundell) Renner; Aniba parvissima Lundell

Species of tree

Damburneya parvissima is a plant species in the family Lauraceae. It is endemic to Guatemala where it has only been found in the departments of Petén and Izabal. It is a tree or shrub of up to 7 m that grows in secondary broadleaf forest in association with Manilkara species.
