= Damburneya smithii =

Conservation status
- Near Threatened (IUCN 3.1)

Scientific classification
- Kingdom: Plantae
- Clade: Tracheophytes
- Clade: Angiosperms
- Clade: Magnoliids
- Order: Laurales
- Family: Lauraceae
- Genus: Damburneya
- Species: D. smithii

Binomial name
- Damburneya smithii (C.K.Allen) Trofimov & Rohwer

Synonyms
- Nectandra smithii C.K.Allen

Species of flowering plant

Damburneya smithii is a species of flowering plant in the family Lauraceae. It is a tree native to Costa Rica and Panama.
