= Siparuna piloso-lepidota =

Conservation status
- Near Threatened (IUCN 3.1)

Scientific classification
- Kingdom: Plantae
- Clade: Tracheophytes
- Clade: Angiosperms
- Clade: Magnoliids
- Order: Laurales
- Family: Siparunaceae
- Genus: Siparuna
- Species: S. piloso-lepidota

Binomial name
- Siparuna piloso-lepidota Heilb.

Synonyms
- Siparuna verrucosa Steyerm.

Species of flowering plant

Siparuna piloso-lepidota is a species of flowering plant in the Siparunaceae family. It is a shrub or tree native to western Colombia and northern Ecuador.
