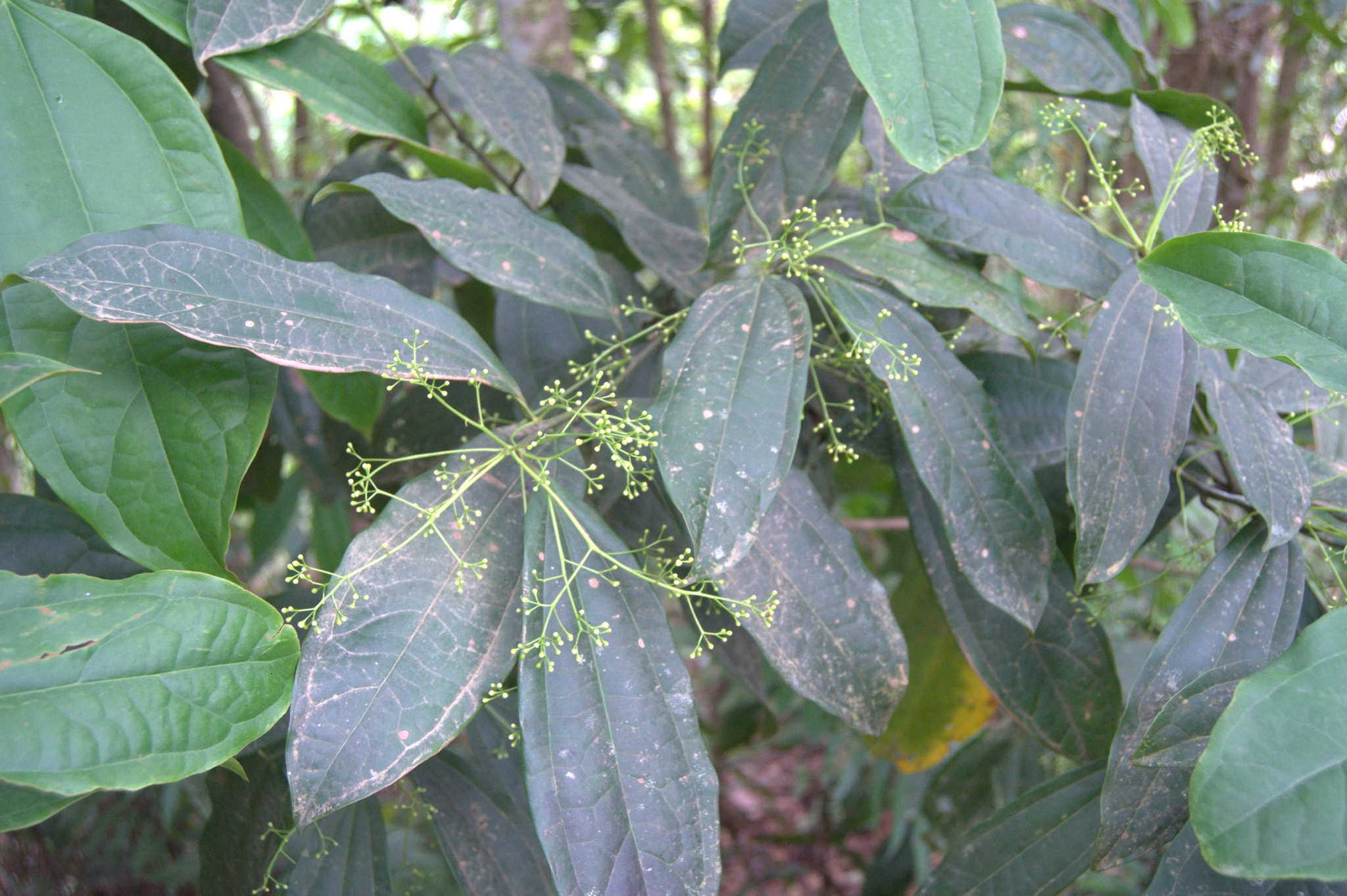
- Aiouea neurophylla

Scientific classification
- Kingdom: Plantae
- Clade: Tracheophytes
- Clade: Angiosperms
- Clade: Magnoliids
- Order: Laurales
- Family: Lauraceae
- Genus: Aiouea; Aubl.

Type species
- Aiouea guianensis Aubl.

Synonyms
- Ajovea Aubl.; Colomandra Neck.; Douglassia Schreb.; Ehrhardia Scop.; Endocarpa Raf.; Mocinnodaphne Lorea-Hern.

= Aiouea =

Genus of flowering plants

Aiouea is a genus of shrubs and trees in the family Lauraceae. It is native to tropical forests and montane forests of North and South America.

== Taxonomy ==
As of September 2026, Plants of the World Online accepts the following 81 species:

- Aiouea acarodomatifera Kosterm.
- Aiouea acuminata van der Werff & Penagos
- Aiouea acutifolia Penagos & van der Werff
- Aiouea alainii (C.K.Allen) R.Rohde
- Aiouea albopunctata Brotto
- Aiouea amoena (Nees & Mart.) R.Rohde
- Aiouea amplexicaulis (Schltdl. & Cham.) R.Rohde
- Aiouea ampullacea Lorea-Hern.
- Aiouea angulata Kosterm.
- Aiouea areolata (Lundell) R.Rohde
- Aiouea baitelloana (van der Werff & P.L.R.Moraes) van der Werff & P.L.R.Moraes
- Aiouea benthamiana Mez
- Aiouea bracteata Kosterm.
- Aiouea bractefoliacea (Lorea-Hern.) R.Rohde
- Aiouea breedlovei (Lundell) R.Rohde
- Aiouea brenesii (Standl.) R.Rohde
- Aiouea chavarriana (Hammel) R.Rohde
- Aiouea chiapensis (Lundell) R.Rohde
- Aiouea chicaque Soler-Umbarila, W.Ariza & Zapata-Corr.
- Aiouea cinnamomoidea (Lorea-Hern.) R.Rohde & Lorea-Hern.
- Aiouea dubia (Kunth) Mez
- Aiouea effusa (Meisn.) R.Rohde & Rohwer
- Aiouea elegans (van der Werff) Rohwer
- Aiouea erythropus (Nees & Mart.) R.Rohde
- Aiouea floccosa (van der Werff) R.Rohde
- Aiouea formicaria (van der Werff & Lorea-Hern.) R.Rohde
- Aiouea glaziovii (Mez) R.Rohde
- Aiouea glossophylla (Lorea-Hern.) R.Rohde
- Aiouea grandifolia van der Werff
- Aiouea grisebachii (Lorea-Hern.) Rohwer
- Aiouea guianensis Aubl.
- Aiouea hammeliana (W.C.Burger) R.Rohde
- Aiouea hartmanii (I.M.Johnst.) R.Rohde
- Aiouea hatschbachii (Vattimo-Gil) R.Rohde
- Aiouea haussknechtii (Mez) R.Rohde
- Aiouea heteranthera (Ruiz & Pav.) R.Rohde
- Aiouea hirsuta Lorea-Hern.
- Aiouea impressa (Meisn.) Kosterm.
- Aiouea intermedia Penagos & van der Werff
- Aiouea kruseana (O.Téllez & Villaseñor) R.Rohde
- Aiouea laevis (Nees ex Mart.) Kosterm.
- Aiouea lanigera (van der Werff) R.Rohde
- Aiouea lehmannii (O.C.Schmidt) Renner
- Aiouea leptophylla (Lorea-Hern.) R.Rohde
- Aiouea longipes (I.M.Johnst.) R.Rohde
- Aiouea longipetiolata van der Werff
- Aiouea macedoana Vattimo-Gil
- Aiouea maguireana (C.K.Allen) Renner
- Aiouea maya Lorea-Hern.
- Aiouea montana (Sw.) R.Rohde
- Aiouea myristicoides Mez
- Aiouea myrmecophila Brotto & P.L.R.Moraes
- Aiouea napoensis (van der Werff) R.Rohde
- Aiouea neurophylla (Mez & Pittier) R.Rohde
- Aiouea obscura van der Werff
- Aiouea ombrophila Brotto & Völtz
- Aiouea opaca van der Werff
- Aiouea pachypoda (Nees) R.Rohde
- Aiouea padiformis (Standl. & Steyerm.) R.Rohde
- Aiouea palaciosii (van der Werff) R.Rohde
- Aiouea paratriplinervis Lorea-Hern.
- Aiouea pelykiflora Penagos & van der Werff
- Aiouea piauhyensis (Meisn.) Mez
- Aiouea pittieri Rohwer
- Aiouea pseudoglaziovii Lorea-Hern.
- Aiouea pubescens Penagos & van der Werff
- Aiouea rubrinervia Lorea-Hern.
- Aiouea salicifolia (Nees) R.Rohde
- Aiouea saligna Meisn.
- Aiouea sellowiana (Nees & Mart.) R.Rohde
- Aiouea stenophylla (Meisn.) R.Rohde
- Aiouea subsessilis (Meisn.) R.Rohde
- Aiouea taubertiana (Mez & Schwacke) R.Rohde
- Aiouea tetragona (Meisn.) R.Rohde
- Aiouea tomentella (Mez) Renner
- Aiouea tomentosa (Meisn.) R.Rohde
- Aiouea tonduzii (Mez) R.Rohde
- Aiouea trinervis Meisn.
- Aiouea uninervia Lorea-Hern.
- Aiouea velveti (Lorea-Hern.) R.Rohde
- Aiouea zapatae (Lorea-Hern.) R.Rohde

=== Previously placed here ===
- Damburneya guatemalensis (as A. guatemalensis)
