= Siparuna croatii =

Conservation status
- Least Concern (IUCN 3.1)

Scientific classification
- Kingdom: Plantae
- Clade: Tracheophytes
- Clade: Angiosperms
- Clade: Magnoliids
- Order: Laurales
- Family: Siparunaceae
- Genus: Siparuna
- Species: S. croatii

Binomial name
- Siparuna croatii S.S. Renner & Hausner

Species of flowering plant

Siparuna croatii is a species of flowering plant in the Siparunaceae family. It is a shrub native to Colombia and Ecuador.
