= Siparuna palenquensis =

Conservation status
- Vulnerable (IUCN 3.1)

Scientific classification
- Kingdom: Plantae
- Clade: Embryophytes
- Clade: Tracheophytes
- Clade: Spermatophytes
- Clade: Angiosperms
- Clade: Magnoliids
- Order: Laurales
- Family: Siparunaceae
- Genus: Siparuna
- Species: S. palenquensis

Binomial name
- Siparuna palenquensis S.S. Renner & Hausner

Species of flowering plant

Siparuna palenquensis is a species of flowering plant in the Siparunaceae family. It is a tree endemic to Ecuador.
