= Damburneya guatemalensis =

Conservation status
- Vulnerable (IUCN 3.1)

Scientific classification
- Kingdom: Plantae
- Clade: Tracheophytes
- Clade: Angiosperms
- Clade: Magnoliids
- Order: Laurales
- Family: Lauraceae
- Genus: Damburneya
- Species: D. guatemalensis

Binomial name
- Damburneya guatemalensis (Lundell) Rohwer

Synonyms
- Aiouea guatemalensis (Lundell) Renner; Aniba guatemalensis Lundell

Species of tree

Damburneya guatemalensis is a plant species in the family Lauraceae. It is endemic to Guatemala where it has only been found in the departments of Petén, Alta Verapaz and Izabal. It is a tree or shrub of up to 8 m that grows in tall broadleaf forest in association with Orbignya species.
