= Aiouea angulata =

Conservation status
- Near Threatened (IUCN 3.1)

Scientific classification
- Kingdom: Plantae
- Clade: Tracheophytes
- Clade: Angiosperms
- Clade: Magnoliids
- Order: Laurales
- Family: Lauraceae
- Genus: Aiouea
- Species: A. angulata

Binomial name
- Aiouea angulata Kosterm.

Species of flowering plant

Aiouea angulata is a species of plant in the family Lauraceae. It is endemic to Colombia.
