= Damburneya matudae =

Conservation status
- Endangered (IUCN 3.1)

Scientific classification
- Kingdom: Plantae
- Clade: Tracheophytes
- Clade: Angiosperms
- Clade: Magnoliids
- Order: Laurales
- Family: Lauraceae
- Genus: Damburneya
- Species: D. matudae

Binomial name
- Damburneya matudae (Lundell) Trofimov & Rohwer

Synonyms
- Nectandra glandulosa Lundell; Nectandra matudae Lundell (1946); Pleurothyrium glandulosum (Lundell) Lundell

Species of tree

Damburneya matudae is a species of flowering plant in the family Lauraceae. It is native to Honduras, Southeast and Southwest Mexico (including the states of Chiapas, Oaxaca and Veracruz).
