= Aiouea cinnamomoidea =

Conservation status
- Endangered (IUCN 3.1)

Scientific classification
- Kingdom: Plantae
- Clade: Tracheophytes
- Clade: Angiosperms
- Clade: Magnoliids
- Order: Laurales
- Family: Lauraceae
- Genus: Aiouea
- Species: A. cinnamomoidea

Binomial name
- Aiouea cinnamomoidea (Lorea-Hern.) R.Rohde & Lorea-Hern.

Synonyms
- Mocinnodaphne cinnamomoidea Lorea-Hern.

Genus of flowering plants

Aiouea cinnamomoidea is a species of tree in the laurel family (Lauraceae). It is native to the states of Oaxaca and Guerrero in southern Mexico.

== Description ==
Aioueia cinnamomoidea is an evergreen shrub or small tree, growing 2 to 10 meters tall, called mountain laurel. The flowers are small, inconspicuous and bisexual. It is distinguished by the presence of only the third whorl of stamens fertile, anthers bicelled, staminodes of the fourth whorl well developed, and a cupule with persistent tepals subtending the fruit. These characteristics are common to Aioueia, Ocotea, Nectandra, Cinnamomum, and few others. The fruit are succulent, olive fruit shaped with a deep thick cup, and dispersed mostly by birds.

== Range and habitat ==
Aioueia cinnamomoidea is native to cloud forests in the Sierra Madre del Sur of Guerrero and Oaxaca states, between 1,600 and 1,800 meters elevation.
