= Aiouea dubia =

Conservation status
- Least Concern (IUCN 3.1)

Scientific classification
- Kingdom: Plantae
- Clade: Tracheophytes
- Clade: Angiosperms
- Clade: Magnoliids
- Order: Laurales
- Family: Lauraceae
- Genus: Aiouea
- Species: A. dubia

Binomial name
- Aiouea dubia (Kunth) Mez

Synonyms
- Aiouea granatensis Mez; Aiouea jelskii Mez; Aiouea tambillensis Mez; Aiouea truxillensis Kosterm.; Cryptocarya dubia Kunth; Endocarpa corymbosa Raf.; Laurus hypericifolia Willd. ex Nees; Persea hypericifolia Nees

Species of tree

Aiouea dubia is a species of tree in the family Lauraceae. It is native to Colombia, Ecuador, Peru, and northwestern Venezuela in tropical South America. It is a small tree which grows up to 10 metres tall. It grows in Andean foothill and montane tropical moist forest, on slopes along streams, from 500 to 2,800 metres elevation.

The species was first described as Cryptocarya dubia by Carl Sigismund Kunth in 1817. In 1889 Carl Christian Mez placed the species in genus Aiouea as A. dubia.
