= Gil Martins Felippe =

Brazilian scientist and writer (1934-2014)

Gil Felippe
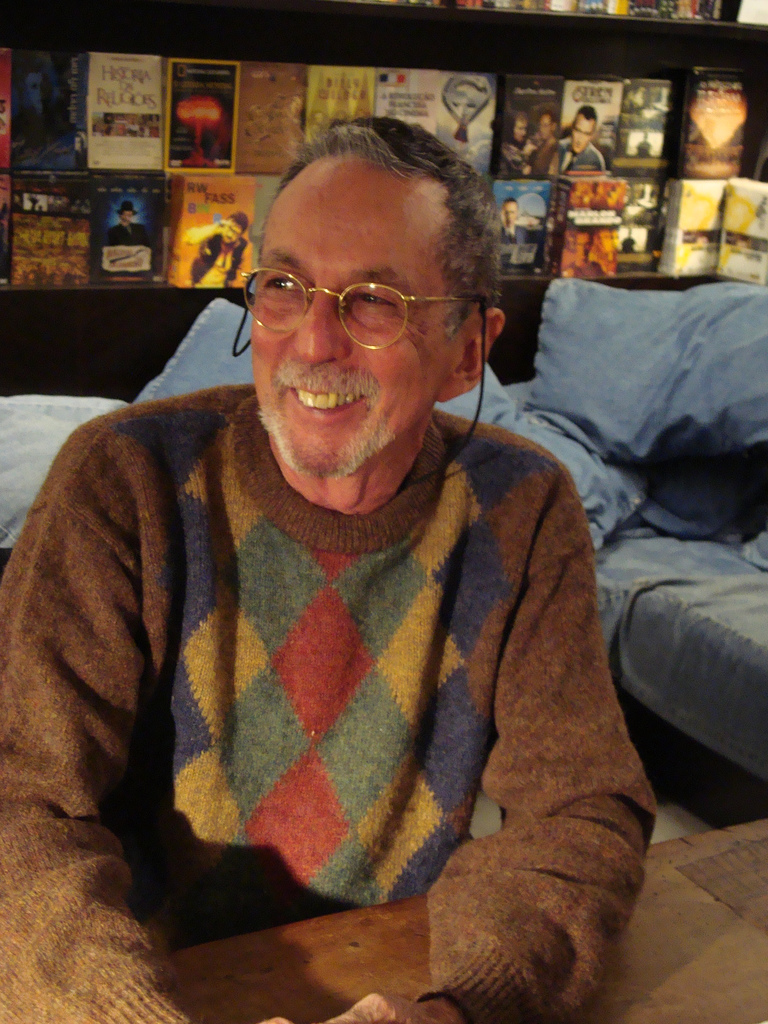
- Felippe in June 2009
- Born: São Carlos
- Occupations: Scientist, writer

Gil Martins Felippe (May 25, 1934 – August 19, 2014) was a Brazilian scientist (Plant Physiology) and writer. He was known as Gil Felippe in his most recent books. He was the son of Bernardina Martins Felippe (15 July 1909 – 22 January 1995), a teacher and Virgilio Felippe (22 May 1904 – 14 July 1996), an accountant.

== Biography ==
Gil Felippe received a PhD from the University of Edinburgh, Scotland, where he did post-doctoral work in plant physiology. His PhD thesis was done under the supervision of Professor John E. Dale. He was a bachelor of Natural History from the University of São Paulo, in São Paulo. His primary and secondary studies were done at the Instituto de Educação Dr. Alvaro Guião, in São Carlos. He also became a teacher of children from the same institute.

He started his academic career as a biologist at the Instituto de Botânica de São Paulo. Later he was an invited lecturer at the department of botany of the University of São Paulo (USP), a post-doctoral research fellow at the botany department of the University of Edinburgh and full professor at the department of plant physiology of the University of Campinas (UNICAMP). His last academic position was as a guest professor at the Instituto de Botânica de São Paulo.

He was a retired professor of UNICAMP. At the department of plant physiology of UNICAMP he was one of the lecturers in the discipline of plant development of the graduation course. He supervised students starting research, as well as students on masters or doctoral work. He was always very active doing his own research work, in the lab and in the field, mainly in cerrado regions. He was also very active in participating of International and Brazilian Botanical Meetings. He retired from the University of Campinas in 1991. He published 168 scientific papers and was the supervisor of 17 MSc theses and of 12 PhD theses. After retiring he became a writer.

== Scientific community ==
He was a founding member of the Association of São Paulo Biologists and then President of the ethical council of the Association (1975–1977). He was also a founder member of the Botanical Society of São Paulo and its first President (1981–1982) and President for a second time (1989–1993). He was the Chairman of the São Paulo Section of the Brazilian Botanical Society (1980–1981). He was a Meritorius Member of the Brazilian Botanical Society. He was a founder of the Brazilian Journal of Botany and its main editor for several years (1980–1982; 1989–1993). He was a member of the Brazilian Society for the Progress of Science - SBPC, the UK Society for Experimental Biology and the Federation of European Societies of Plant Physiology. He was a Research-Fellow of the National Council of Technological and Scientific Development, CNPq (1977–1999). He was a Full Member of the Academy of Sciences of the State of São Paulo, since 1977. He was a coordinator of the Biology area of the Foundation for Implementation of Research of the State of São Paulo - FAPESP (1982) and coordinator of the Group of Research in Zoology and Botany of the National Council of Scientific and Technological Development – CNPq (1982–1985).

== Scientific Information Books (in Portuguese) ==
- O saber do sabor – as plantas nossas de cada dia / Understanding taste – our everyday plants (watercolours by Maria Cecília Tomasi). Editora Salamandra, Lisboa e Capacitas, São Paulo, 192p, 1998.
- Entre o jardim e a horta – as flores que vão para a mesa / Between the garden and the kitchen-garden – edible flowers (watercolours by Maria Cecília Tomasi). Editora SENAC, São Paulo, 286p, 2003.
- No Rastro de Afrodite: plantas afrodisíacas e culinária / On the steps of Aphrodite – aphrodisiac plants and cookery (watercolours by Maria Cecília Tomasi). Ateliê Editorial e Editora SENAC, São Paulo, 310p, 2004.
- Frutas – sabor à primeira dentada / Dessert-fruits – taste at the first bite (watercolours by Maria Cecília Tomasi). Editora SENAC, São Paulo, 302p, 2005.
- O saber do sabor – as plantas nossas de cada dia / Understanding taste – our everyday plants (watercolours by Maria Cecília Tomasi). 2nd ed. Editora Setembro, Holambra, 157p, 2006
- Grãos e sementes – a vida encapsulada / Grains and seeds – encapsulated life (watercolours by Maria Cecília Tomasi). Editora SENAC, São Paulo, 430p, 2007.
- Do Éden ao Éden – jardins botânicos e a aventura das plantas / From Eden to Eden – botanic gardens and the adventure of plants (with Lilian Penteado Zaidan). Editora SENAC, São Paulo, 318p, 2008.
- Árvores frutíferas exóticas / Exotic fruit-trees. Editora Sarandi, São Paulo, 64p, 2008.
- Amaro Macedo – o solitário do cerrado / Amaro Macedo – the loner of the cerrado (with Maria do Carmo Duarte Macedo). Ateliê Editorial, Cotia, 224p, 2009.
- Venenosas - plantas que matam também curam / Poisonous plants - plants that kill also heal (illustrations Maria Cecília Tomasi). Editora SENAC, São Paulo, 352p, 2009.
- Árvores frutíferas brasileiras / Brazilian fruit-trees. Editora Sarandi, São Paulo, 64p, 2009.
- Amendoim - história, botânica e culinária / Peanuts - history, botany and culinary. Editora SENAC, São Paulo, 232p, 2011.
- O rio na parede / The river on the wall. Ateliê Editorial, São Paulo, 85p, 2012.
- Gaia: o lado oculto das plantas - Tubérculos, rizomas, raízes e bulbos /Gaia: the ocult side of plants - tubers, rhizomes, roots and bulbs. Edições Tapioca, São Paulo, 118p, 2012.
- Cães, gatos e plantas - o veneno ao alcance das patas / Dogs, cats and plants - the poison within reach of paws. Editora Setembro, Holambra, 160p, 2012.

== Prizes ==
- The book No rastro de Afrodite – plantas afrodisíacas e culinária (On the steps of Aphrodite – aphrodisiac plants and cookery) received two Gourmand World Cookbook Awards in 2004: best book of Brazilian culinary history and best book of illustrations of a Brazilian culinary book.
- The book Grãos e sementes – a vida encapsulada (Grains and seeds – encapsulated life) received two Gourmand World Cookbook Awards in 2007: best book in Brazil of a single subject in culinary matters and best book of illustrations of a Brazilian culinary book.

== PhD Thesis ==
- Effects of a quaternary ammonium compound and gibberellic acid on the growth of Phaseolus. Ph.D. Thesis. University of Edinburgh. 128p, 1967.

== Technical books ==
- Fitocromo e crescimento vegetal (translation of "Phytochrome and plant growth" de R.E. Kendrick & B. Frankland). EPU & EDUSP, São Paulo, 76p, 1981.
- Anatomia do vegetal em desenvolvimento (technical revision of the translation of "Developmental plant anatomy" de A.R. Gemmell). EPU & EDUSP, São Paulo, 73p, 1981.
- Luz e vida vegetal (translation of "Light and plant life" de J.M. Whatley & F.R. Whatley). EPU & EDUSP, São Paulo, 101p, 1981.
- Fisiologia do desenvolvimento vegetal (with I.F.M. Válio, M.F.A. Pereira, R.R. Sharif & S.R.V. Santos). Editora Campus, Rio de Janeiro, 66p, 1983.
- Fisiologia do desenvolvimento vegetal (with I.F.M. Válio, M.F.A. Pereira, R.R. Sharif & S.R.V. Santos). Editora da UNICAMP, Campinas, 64p, 2º edição, 1985.
