= Damburneya salicina =

Conservation status
- Least Concern (IUCN 3.1)

Scientific classification
- Kingdom: Plantae
- Clade: Tracheophytes
- Clade: Angiosperms
- Clade: Magnoliids
- Order: Laurales
- Family: Lauraceae
- Genus: Damburneya
- Species: D. salicina

Binomial name
- Damburneya salicina (C.K.Allen) Trofimov & Rohwer

Synonyms
- Nectandra salicina C.K.Allen; Nectandra davidsoniana C.K.Allen

Species of flowering plant

Damburneya salicina is a species of flowering plant in the family Lauraceae. It is a shrub or tree native to Costa Rica and Panama.
