= Damburneya leucocome =

Conservation status
- Endangered (IUCN 3.1)

Scientific classification
- Kingdom: Plantae
- Clade: Tracheophytes
- Clade: Angiosperms
- Clade: Magnoliids
- Order: Laurales
- Family: Lauraceae
- Genus: Damburneya
- Species: D. leucocome

Binomial name
- Damburneya leucocome (Rohwer) Trofimov & Rohwer

Synonyms
- Nectandra leucocome Rohwer

Species of flowering plant

Damburneya leucocome is a species of plant in the family Lauraceae. It is endemic to Chiapas state in southwestern Mexico.
