= Damburneya minima =

Conservation status
- Least Concern (IUCN 3.1)

Scientific classification
- Kingdom: Plantae
- Clade: Tracheophytes
- Clade: Angiosperms
- Clade: Magnoliids
- Order: Laurales
- Family: Lauraceae
- Genus: Damburneya
- Species: D. minima

Binomial name
- Damburneya minima (Rohwer) Trofimov

Synonyms
- Nectandra minima Rohwer; Nectandra exaltata Griseb.

Species of flowering plant

Damburneya minima is a species of flowering plant in the family Lauraceae. It is a shrub or tree endemic to western Cuba, including Artemisa and Pinar del Río provinces and the Isla de la Juventud. It grows in coastal and lowland xeromorphic scrub, microphyl evergreen forest, gallery forest, sandy savanna, and pine forest from 5 to 500 meters elevation.

It is threatened by habitat loss.
