= Aiouea obscura =

Conservation status
- Vulnerable (IUCN 3.1)

Scientific classification
- Kingdom: Plantae
- Clade: Tracheophytes
- Clade: Angiosperms
- Clade: Magnoliids
- Order: Laurales
- Family: Lauraceae
- Genus: Aiouea
- Species: A. obscura

Binomial name
- Aiouea obscura van der Werff

Species of flowering plant

Aiouea obscura is a species of plant in the family Lauraceae endemic to Costa Rica. The species occurs on the southern Pacific slopes, south-east of Palmar north.
