= Damburneya mirafloris =

Conservation status
- Endangered (IUCN 3.1)

Scientific classification
- Kingdom: Plantae
- Clade: Tracheophytes
- Clade: Angiosperms
- Clade: Magnoliids
- Order: Laurales
- Family: Lauraceae
- Genus: Damburneya
- Species: D. mirafloris

Binomial name
- Damburneya mirafloris (van der Werff) Trofimov & Rohwer

Synonyms
- Nectandra mirafloris van der Werff

Species of flowering plant

Damburneya mirafloris is a species of flowering plant in the family Lauraceae. It is a tree endemic to Nicaragua.
