= Aiouea acarodomatifera =

Conservation status
- Least Concern (IUCN 3.1)

Scientific classification
- Kingdom: Plantae
- Clade: Tracheophytes
- Clade: Angiosperms
- Clade: Magnoliids
- Order: Laurales
- Family: Lauraceae
- Genus: Aiouea
- Species: A. acarodomatifera

Binomial name
- Aiouea acarodomatifera Kosterm.

Synonyms
- Aiouea barbellata Kosterm.; Aiouea schwackeana var. bullata Kosterm.

Species of flowering plant

Aiouea acarodomatifera is a species of flowering plant in the family Lauraceae. It is a tree endemic to southeastern and southern Brazil which grows 8 to 15 metres tall. It grows in moist lowland evergreen and semideciduous Atlantic Forest.
