= Aiouea benthamiana =

Conservation status
- Endangered (IUCN 3.1)

Scientific classification
- Kingdom: Plantae
- Clade: Embryophytes
- Clade: Tracheophytes
- Clade: Spermatophytes
- Clade: Angiosperms
- Clade: Magnoliids
- Order: Laurales
- Family: Lauraceae
- Genus: Aiouea
- Species: A. benthamiana

Binomial name
- Aiouea benthamiana Mez

Species of flowering plant

Aiouea benthamiana is a species of flowering plant in the family Lauraceae. It is sometimes referred to by the common name louro Rosa. It is a shrub or tree native to northern Brazil, Colombia, and Venezuela.
