= Glossocalyx =

Conservation status
- Least Concern (IUCN 3.1)

Scientific classification
- Kingdom: Plantae
- Clade: Tracheophytes
- Clade: Angiosperms
- Clade: Magnoliids
- Order: Laurales
- Family: Siparunaceae
- Genus: Glossocalyx; Benth.
- Species: G. longicuspis

Binomial name
- Glossocalyx longicuspis Benth.

Synonyms
- Glossocalyx brevipes Benth.; Glossocalyx brevipes var. letouzeyi Fouilloy; Glossocalyx staudtii Engl.; Glossocalyx zenkeri J.Wagner

Genus of plants

Glossocalyx is a monotypic genus of flowering plants belonging to the family Siparunaceae. The only species is Glossocalyx longicuspis, a shrub or tree native to southern Nigeria, Cameroon, Equatorial Guinea, Gabon, and the Republic of the Congo. It grows in lowland tropical rain forest.
