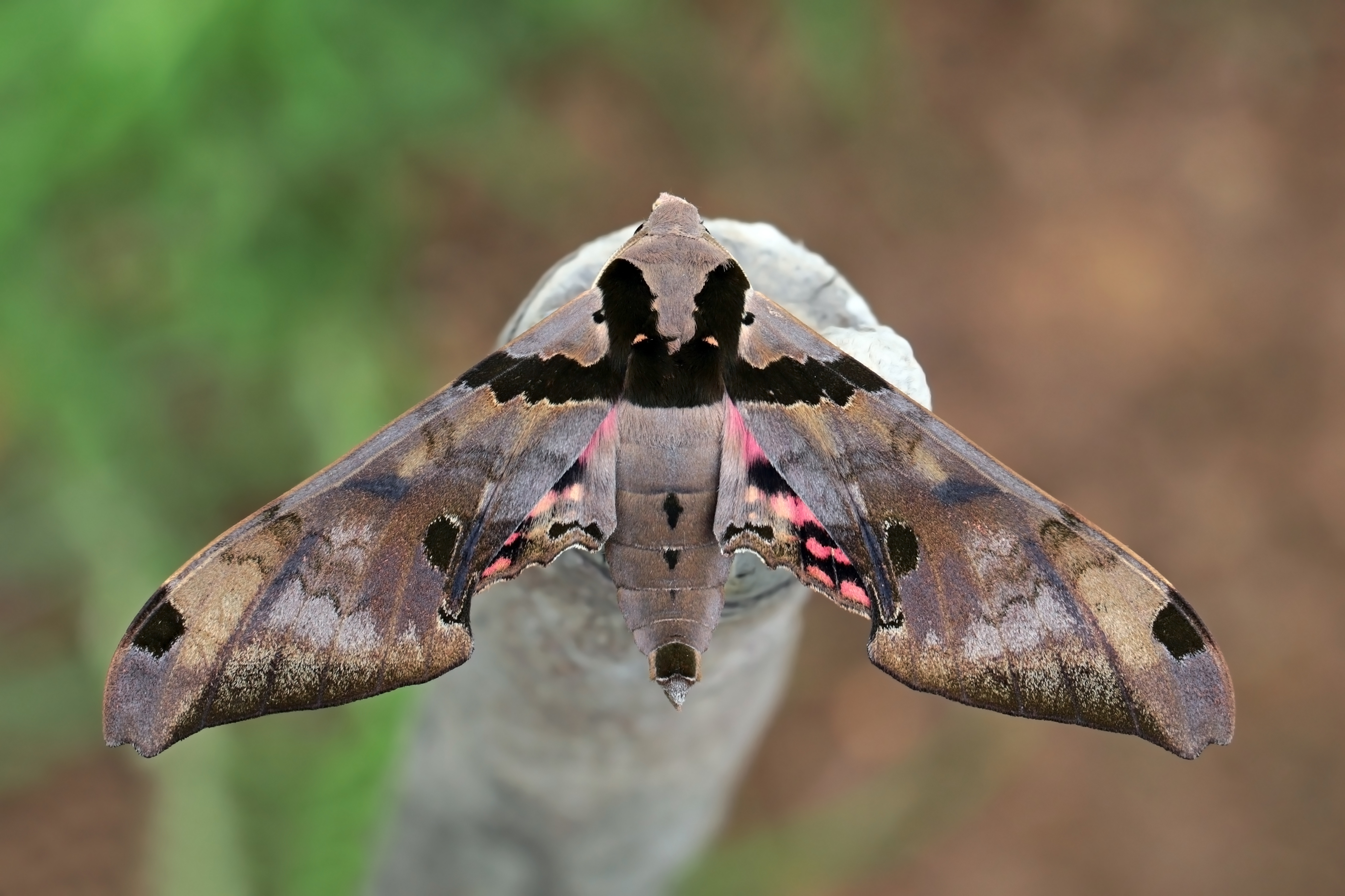
- in Panama

Scientific classification
- Domain: Eukaryota
- Kingdom: Animalia
- Phylum: Arthropoda
- Class: Insecta
- Order: Lepidoptera
- Family: Sphingidae
- Genus: Adhemarius
- Species: A. gannascus

Binomial name
- Adhemarius gannascus (Stoll, 1790)

Synonyms
- Sphinx gannascus Stoll, 1790; Ambulyx janus Boisduval, 1870; Ambulyx rostralis Boisduval, 1870; Amplypterus germanus Zikán, 1934; Amplypterus gannascus connexa (Closs, 1915); Amplypterus gannascus grisescens (Closs, 1915); Amplypterus gannascus magicus (Gehlen, 1928); Amplypterus gannascus rubra (Closs, 1911); Amplypterus gannascus (Stoll, [1790])

= Adhemarius gannascus =

Species of moth

Adhemarius gannascus is a moth of the family Sphingidae first described by Caspar Stoll in 1790.

== Distribution ==
It is known from Jamaica, Mexico, Belize, Guatemala, El Salvador, Honduras, Nicaragua, Costa Rica, Panama, Colombia, Ecuador, Peru, Venezuela, Panama, Guyana, Suriname, French Guiana, Bolivia, Brazil, northern Argentina, southern Paraguay and Uruguay.

== Description ==
The wingspan is 92–112 mm for males and 98–124 mm for females. Adults are on wing year round.

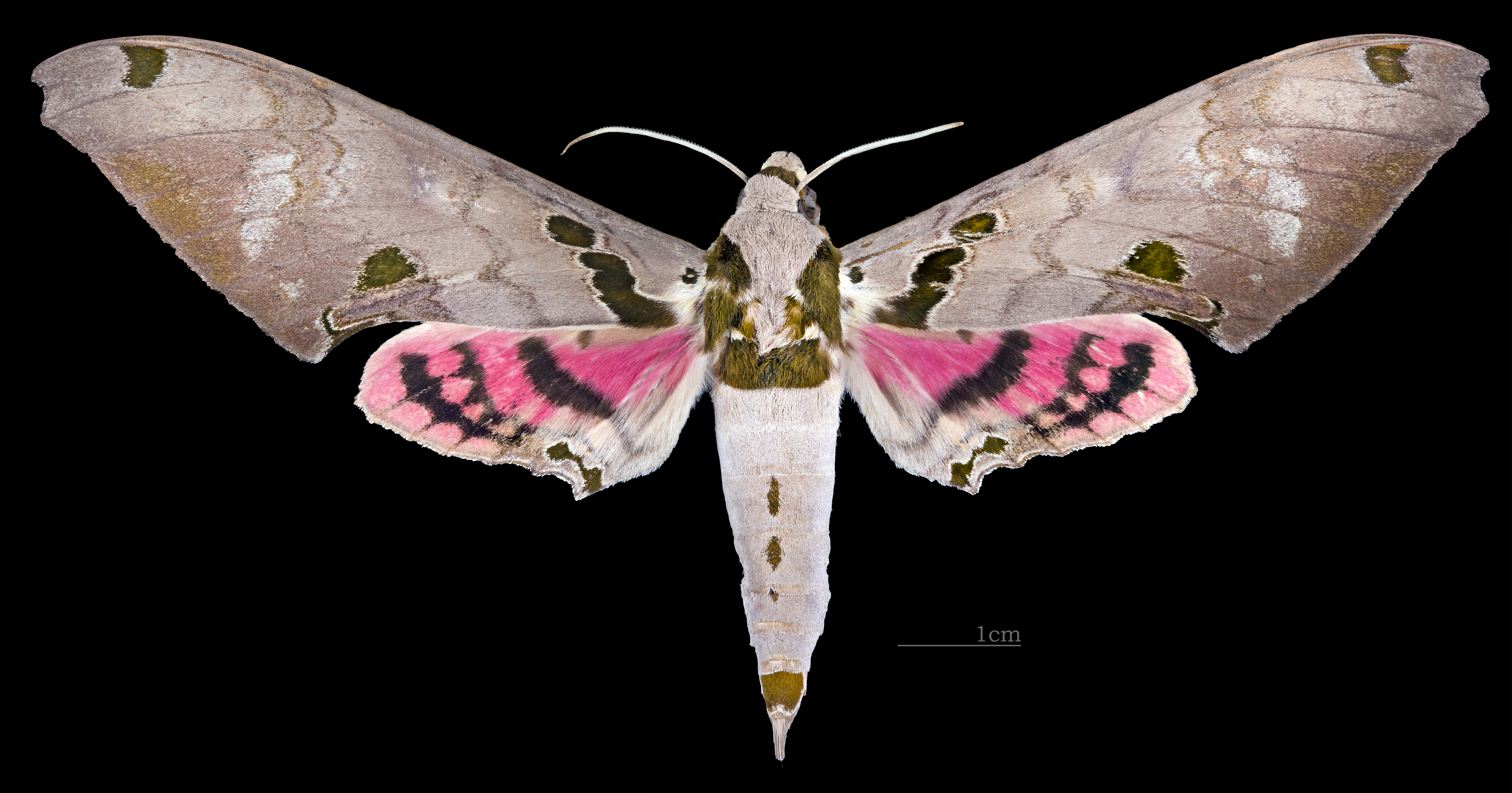
male, dorsal side

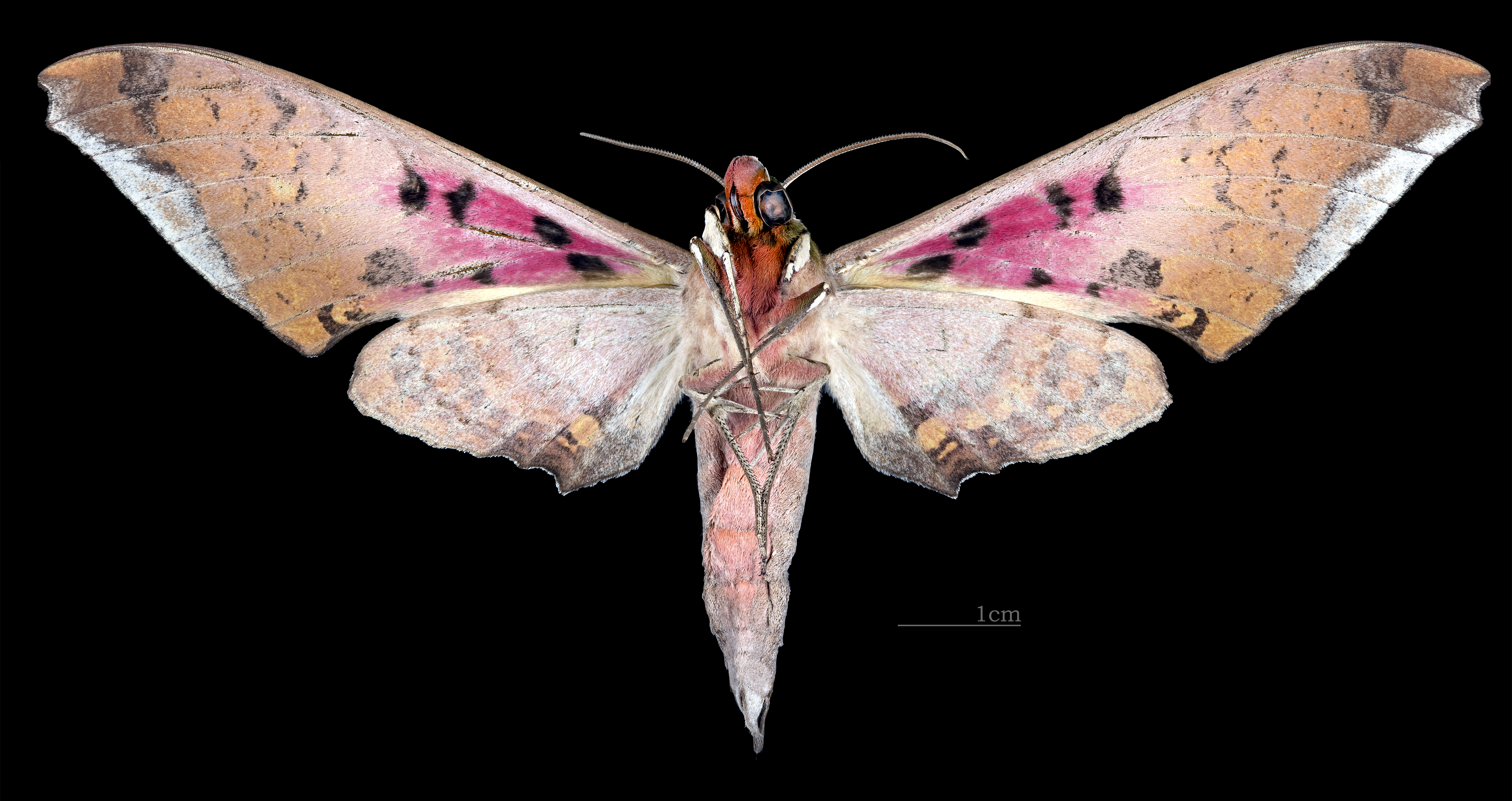
male, ventral side

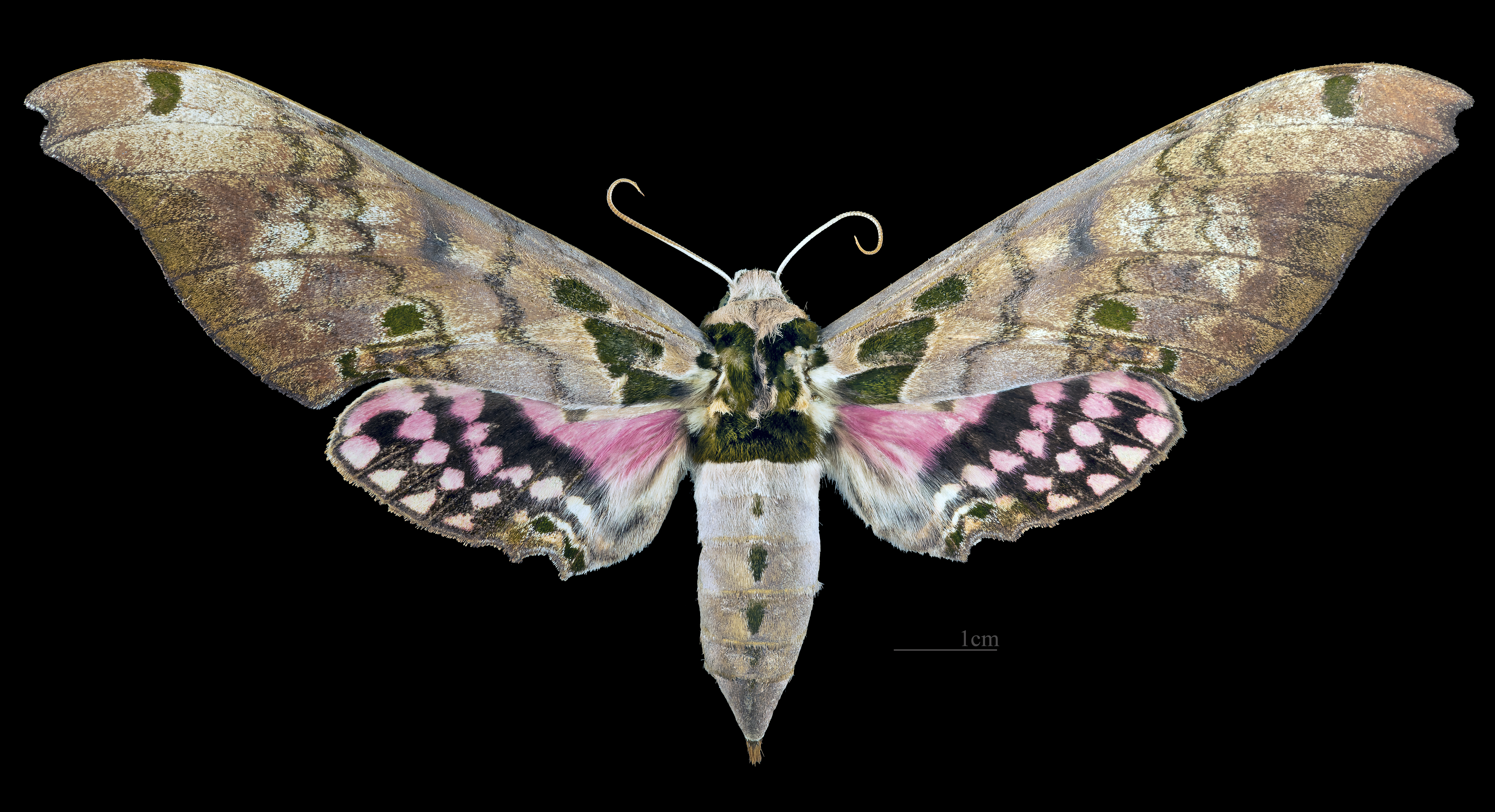
Female dorsal view

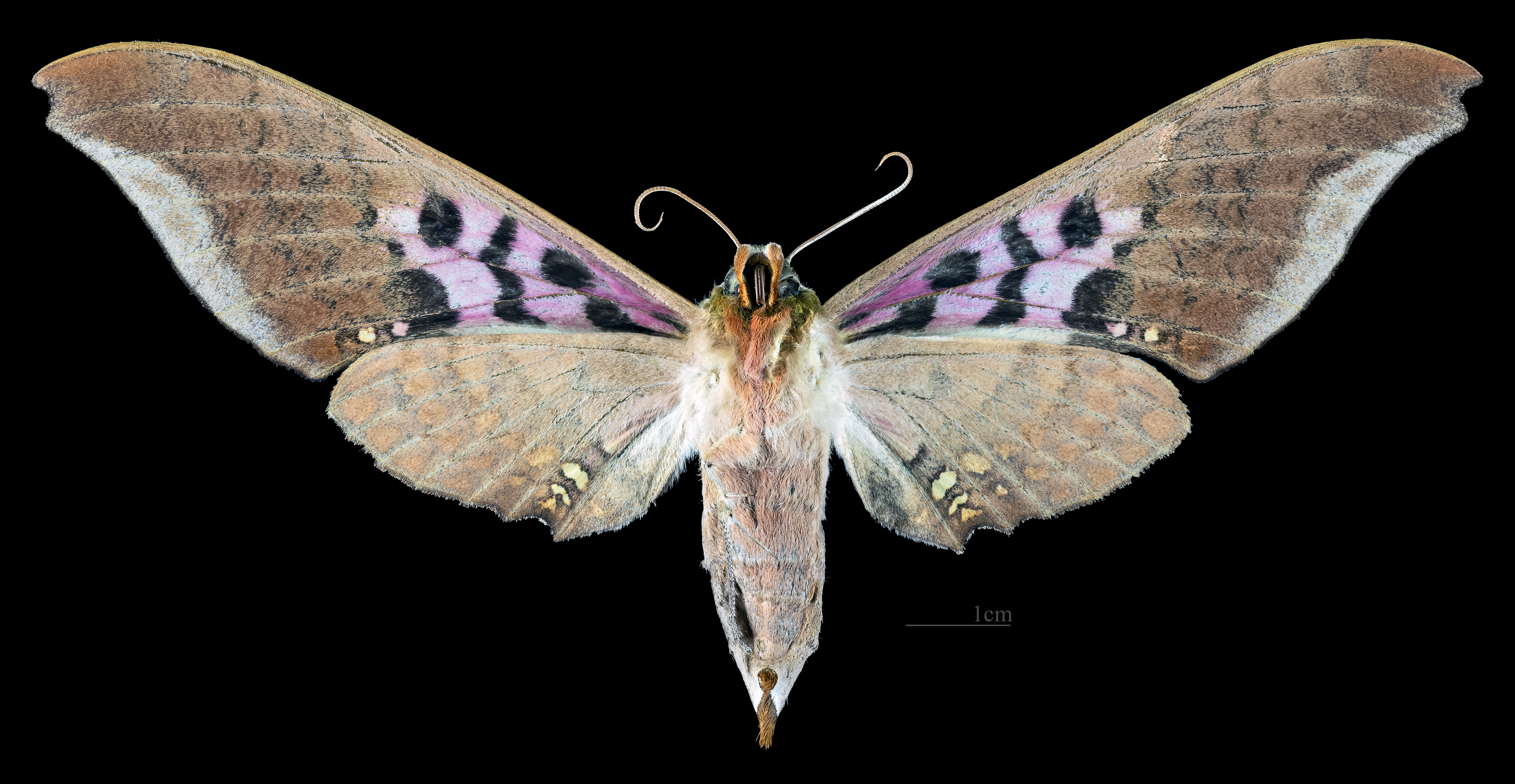
Female ventral view

== Biology ==
The larvae have been recorded feeding on Ocotea veraguensis, Persea povedae, Persea americana and Damburneya salicina.

== Taxonomy ==
- Adhemarius gannascus cubanus (Rothschild & Jordan, 1908)
- Adhemarius gannascus jamaicensis (Rothschild & Jordan, 1915)
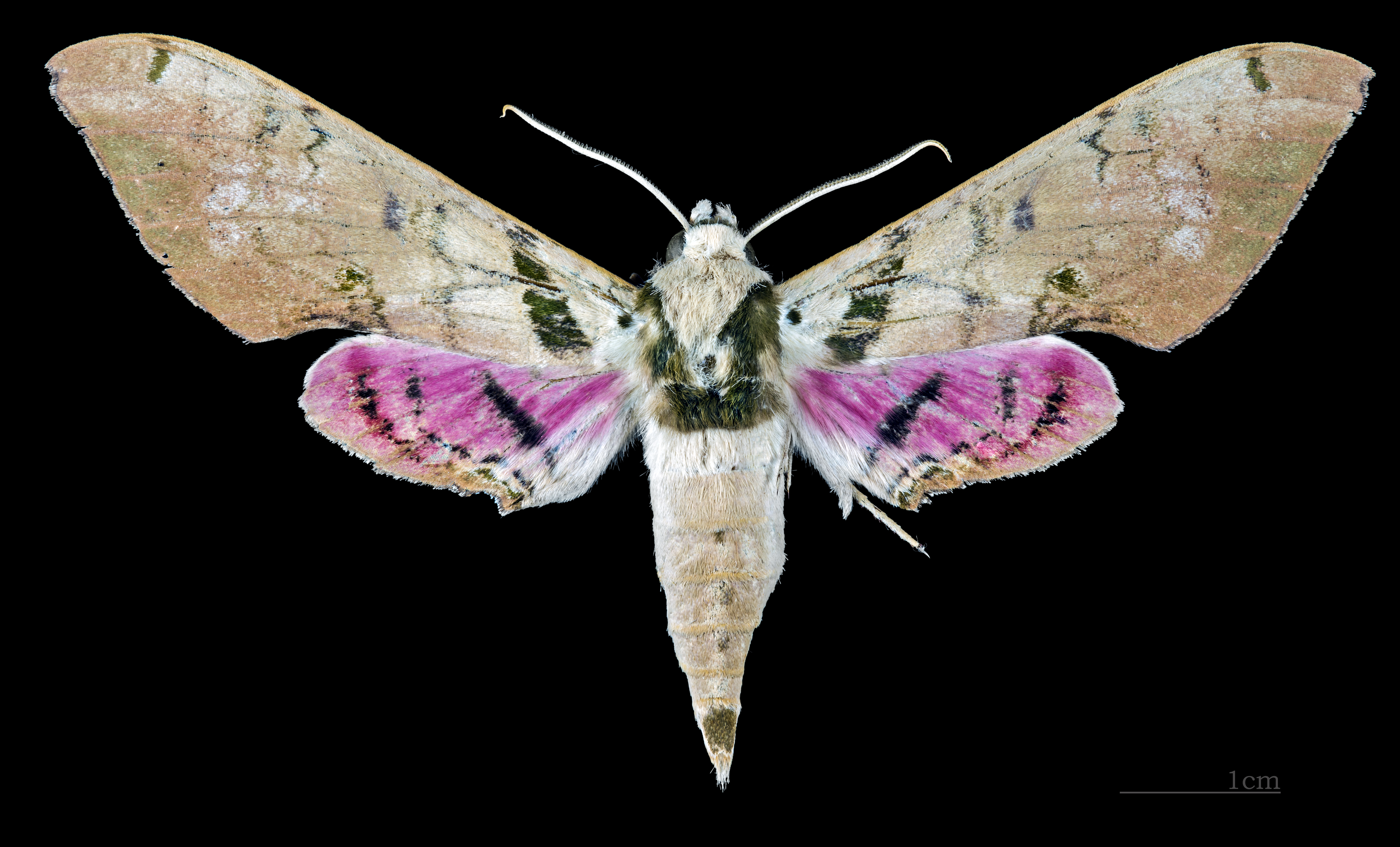
Adhemarius gannascus cubanus dorsal view

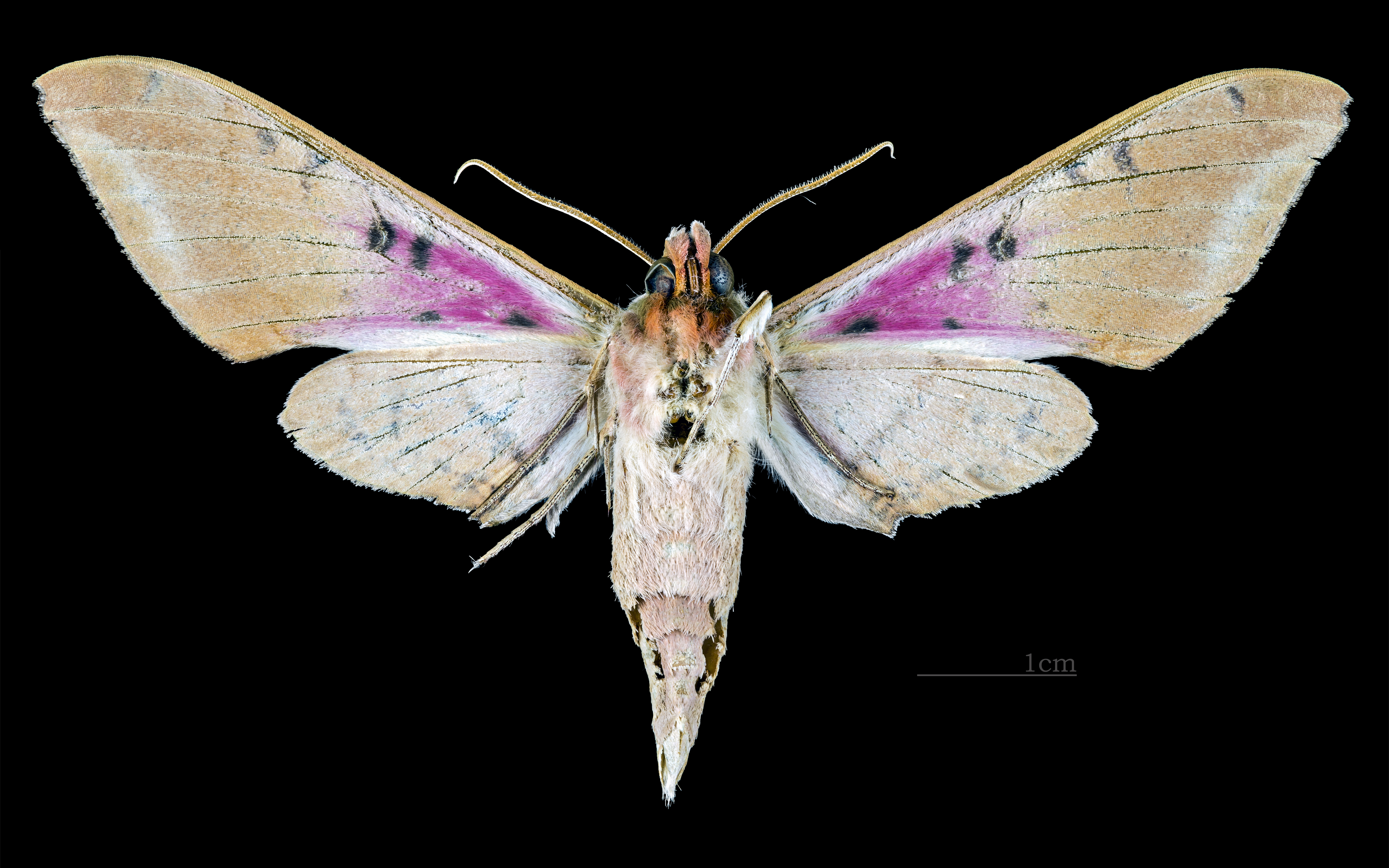
Adhemarius gannascus cubanus ventral view
