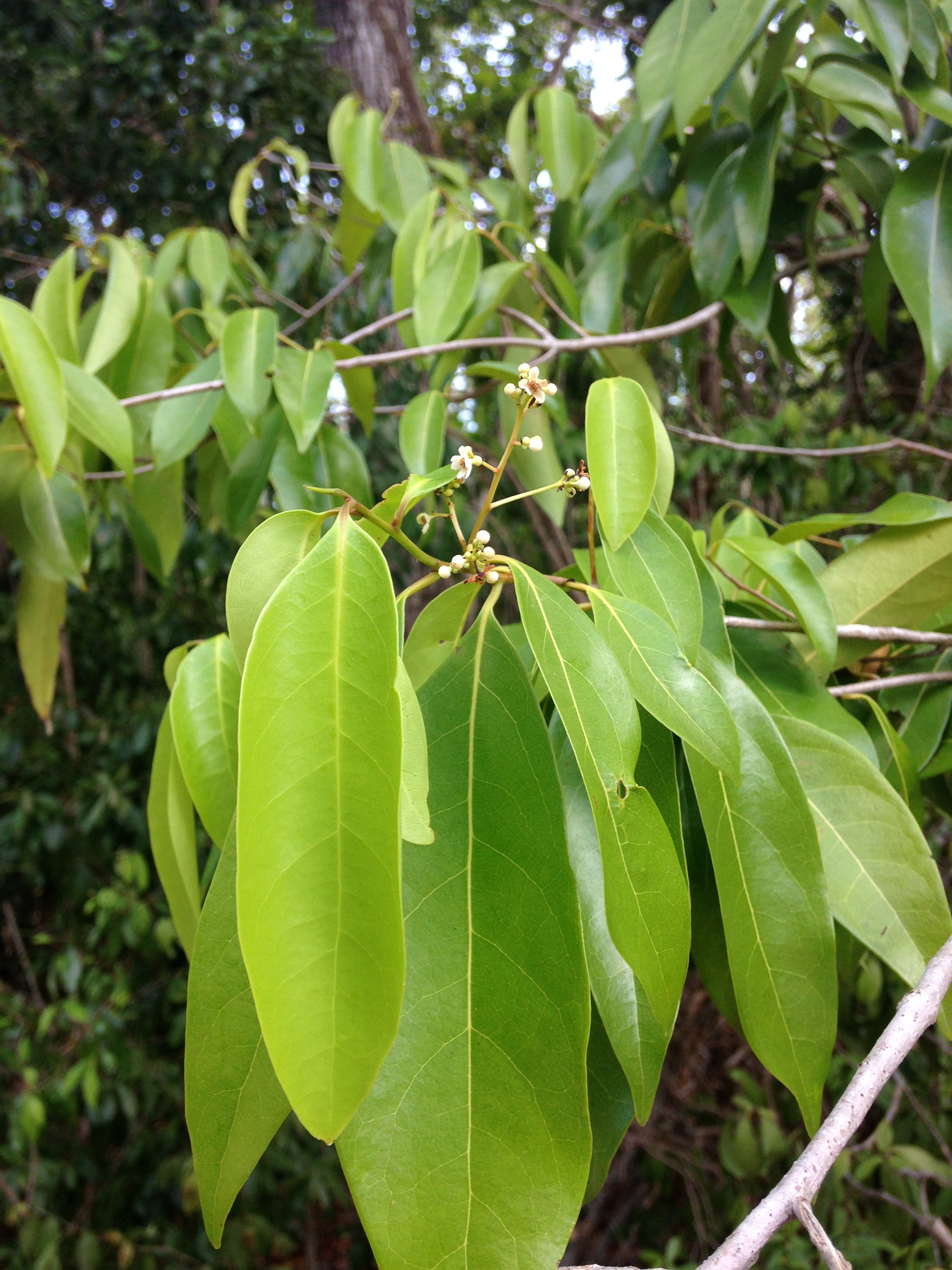
- Damburneya coriacea

Scientific classification
- Kingdom: Plantae
- Clade: Tracheophytes
- Clade: Angiosperms
- Clade: Magnoliids
- Order: Laurales
- Family: Lauraceae
- Genus: Damburneya; Raf.

Species
- Around 25, see text

= Damburneya =

Genus of flowering plants

Damburneya is a genus of evergreen trees and shrubs in the laurel family (Lauraceae). It is native to tropical regions of North America and South America, with the center of diversity in Central America.

Damburneya consists of around 25 species. Most species currently included in Damburneya were historically treated under Nectandra until a 2016 phylogenetic study revealed Nectrandra to be polyphyletic.

== Ecology ==
Damburneya umbrosa and its relatives are favorite fruits of the quetzal. Their differing maturing times in the Cloud forest determine the migratory movements of the quetzals to differing elevation levels in the forests. With a gape width of 21 mm, the quetzal swallows the small berries (aquacatillos) whole, which he catches while flying through the lower canopy of the tree, and then regurgitates the seed within 100 meters from the tree. Wheelwright, in 1983, observed that parent quetzals take far fewer time intervals to deliver fruits to the young brood than insects or lizards, reflecting the ease of procuring fruits, as opposed to capturing animal prey. Since the young are fed exclusively berries in the first two weeks after hatching, these berries must be highly nutritional. Usually, only the total percentage of water, sugar, nitrogen, crude fats and carbohydrates are reported by ornithologists.

== Species ==
As of September 2026, Plants of the World Online accepts 25 species:

- Damburneya ambigens (S.F.Blake) Trofimov – Mexico to Honduras
- Damburneya bicolor (Rohwer) Trofimov & Rohwer – Panama
- Damburneya colorata (Lundell) Trofimov – southern Mexico, Guatemala, and Belize
- Damburneya coriacea (Sw.) Trofimov & Rohwer – Mexico to Honduras, Caribbean islands, and southern Florida
- Damburneya cufodontisii (O.C.Schmidt) Trofimov & Rohwer – Costa Rica and Panama
- Damburneya gentlei (Lundell) Trofimov – southern Mexico to Honduras
- Damburneya guatemalensis (Lundell) Rohwer – Guatemala
- Damburneya inconspicua (van der Werff) Trofimov – southern Mexico and Guatemala
- Damburneya leucocome (Rohwer) Trofimov & Rohwer – Mexico (Chiapas)
- Damburneya longicaudata (Lundell) Trofimov & Rohwer – southern Mexico to Honduras
- Damburneya longipetiolata (van der Werff) Trofimov & Rohwer – Costa Rica
- Damburneya martinicensis (Mez) Trofimov – southern Mexico, Central America, northwestern South America, and Trinidad
- Damburneya matudae (Lundell) Trofimov & Rohwer – Southern Mexico and Honduras
- Damburneya minima (Rohwer) Trofimov – western Cuba (incl. Isla de la Juventud).
- Damburneya mirafloris (van der Werff) Trofimov & Rohwer – Nicaragua
- Damburneya nitida (Mez) Trofimov & Rohwer – southern Mexico to Panama
- Damburneya parvissima (Lundell) Trofimov – Guatemala
- Damburneya patens (Sw.) Trofimov – Caribbean islands
- Damburneya purpurea (Ruiz & Pav.) Trofimov – Chiapas, Nicaragua to Bolivia and eastern Brazil
- Damburneya roberto-andinoi (C.Nelson) van der Werff – Honduras
- Damburneya rudis (C.K.Allen) Trofimov & Rohwer – Chiapas to Honduras
- Damburneya salicifolia (Kunth) Trofimov & Rohwer – Mexico to Nicaragua
- Damburneya salicina (C.K.Allen) Trofimov & Rohwer – Chiapas, Costa Rica and Panama
- Damburneya smithii (C.K.Allen) Trofimov & Rohwer – Costa Rica and Panama
- Damburneya umbrosa (Kunth) Trofimov – Honduras to Ecuador
