= Damburneya roberto-andinoi =

Conservation status
- Vulnerable (IUCN 3.1)

Scientific classification
- Kingdom: Plantae
- Clade: Tracheophytes
- Clade: Angiosperms
- Clade: Magnoliids
- Order: Laurales
- Family: Lauraceae
- Genus: Damburneya
- Species: D. roberto-andinoi

Binomial name
- Damburneya roberto-andinoi (C.Nelson) van der Werff

Synonyms
- Nectandra roberto-andinoi (C.Nelson) C.Nelson; Pleurothyrium roberto-andinoi C.Nelson

Species of flowering plant

Damburneya roberto-andinoi is a species of plant in the family Lauraceae. It is endemic to Honduras. It is a tree growing up to 15 meters tall.

Damburneya roberto-andinoi grows in humid lowland and montane forests in the Chortis Highlands, from 700 to 1,600 meters elevation.
