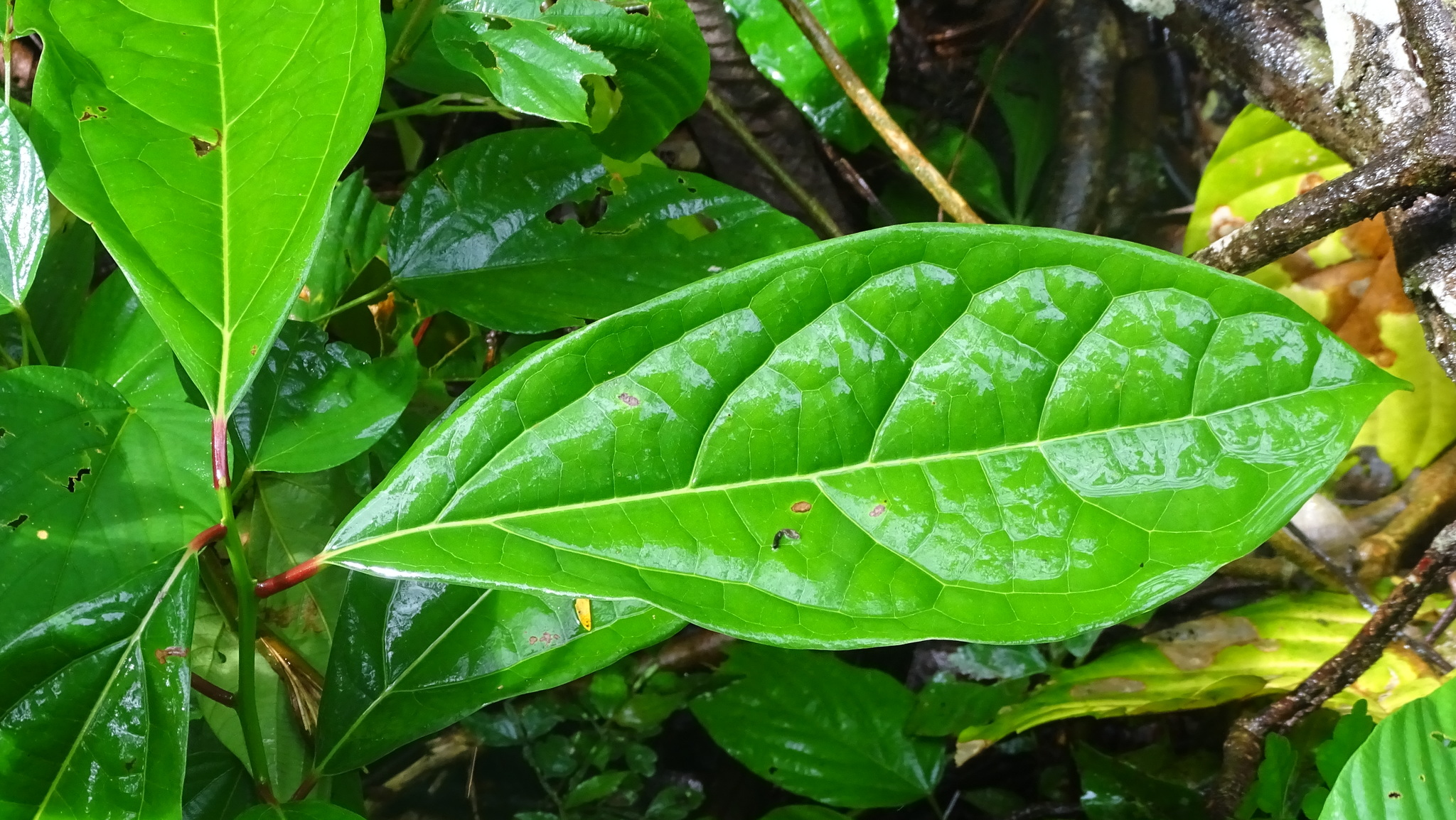

Conservation status
- Least Concern (IUCN 3.1)

Scientific classification
- Kingdom: Plantae
- Clade: Tracheophytes
- Clade: Angiosperms
- Clade: Magnoliids
- Order: Laurales
- Family: Lauraceae
- Genus: Aiouea
- Species: A. montana

Binomial name
- Aiouea montana (Sw.) R.Rohde

Synonyms
- Synonymy: Ceramocarpium cubense (Nees) Nees; Cinnamomum antillanum (Meisn.) Kosterm.; Cinnamomum australe Vattimo-Gil; Cinnamomum brasiliense (Mez) Kosterm.; Cinnamomum chana Vattimo-Gil; Cinnamomum cinnamomifolium (Kunth) Kosterm.; Cinnamomum cubense (Nees) Kosterm.; Cinnamomum elongatum (Nees) Kosterm.; Cinnamomum filamentosum (C.K.Allen) Kosterm.; Cinnamomum fruticosum (Lundell) Kosterm.; Cinnamomum heterotepalum (Mez) Kosterm.; Cinnamomum johnstonii (C.K.Allen) Kosterm.; Cinnamomum maynense (Nees) Kosterm.; Cinnamomum mexicanum (Meisn.) Kosterm.; Cinnamomum montanum (Sw.) J.Presl; Cinnamomum paraguariense (Hassl.) Kosterm.; Cinnamomum peruvianum Kosterm.; Cinnamomum phoebe Doweld; Cinnamomum pichisense (A.C.Sm.) Kosterm.; Cinnamomum pickellii (Coe-Teix.) Kosterm.; Cinnamomum portosecurianum Vattimo-Gil; Cinnamomum triplinerve (Ruiz & Pav.) Kosterm.; Cinnamomum xinguense Vattimo-Gil; Laurus elongata Vahl ex Nees; Laurus hundensis Willd. ex Nees; Laurus leucoxylon Willd. ex Nees; Laurus montana Sw.; Laurus montana Poepp. ex Meisn.; Laurus nutans Isert ex Nees; Laurus paniculata Poir.; Laurus parviflora Balb. ex Meisn.; Laurus triplinervis Ruiz & Pav.; Ocotea cymbarum Poepp. ex Nees; Ocotea elongata Nees ex Meisn.; Ocotea flavescens Rusby; Ocotea maynensis Poepp. ex Meisn.; Oreodaphne alba A.Rich.; Oreodaphne maynensis Poepp. ex Meisn.; Persea cinnamomifolia Kunth; Persea mexicana (Meisn.) Hemsl.; Persea montana (Sw.) Spreng.; Persea nutans Nees; Persea triplinervis var. valenzuelana (A.Rich.) M.Gómez; Persea triplinervis var. wrightii M.Gómez; Phoebe antillana Meisn.; Phoebe antillana var. cubensis (Nees) Meisn.; Phoebe antillana var. genuina Meisn.; Phoebe antillana var. portoricensis Meisn.; Phoebe brasiliensis Mez; Phoebe cinnamomifolia (Kunth) Nees; Phoebe cubensis Nees; Phoebe elongata Nees; Phoebe elongata var. elliptica R.L.Brooks; Phoebe elongata var. lanceolata R.L.Brooks; Phoebe filamentosa C.K.Allen; Phoebe fruticosa Lundell; Phoebe granatensis Meisn.; Phoebe granatensis var. oerstedii Meisn.; Phoebe heterotepala Mez; Phoebe johnstonii C.K.Allen; Phoebe maynensis Nees; Phoebe mexicana Meisn.; Phoebe mexicana var. bourgeauana Mez; Phoebe montana (Sw.) Griseb.; Phoebe montana var. rigida Meisn.; Phoebe paraguariensis Hassl.; Phoebe peruviana Meisn.; Phoebe peruviana var. glabriflora Meisn.; Phoebe pichisensis A.C.Sm.; Phoebe pickellii Coe-Teix.; Phoebe poeppigii Meisn.; Phoebe poiretiana Nees; Phoebe triplinervis (Ruiz & Pav.) Mez; Phoebe triplinervis var. cubensis (Nees) C.Wright; Phoebe valenzuelana A.Rich.

= Aiouea montana =

Species of plant

Aiouea montana is a tree in the family Lauraceae. It can grow up to 30 m (98 ft) in height. It flowers in May and June and bears fruit in July and August. It ranges from northeastern Mexico through Central America, the Caribbean, and tropical South America to southern Brazil.

The species was first described as Laurus montana by Olof Swartz in 1788. In 2017 Randi Rohde placed the species in genus Aiouea as A. montana.
