= Damburneya cufodontisii =

Conservation status
- Least Concern (IUCN 3.1)

Scientific classification
- Kingdom: Plantae
- Clade: Tracheophytes
- Clade: Angiosperms
- Clade: Magnoliids
- Order: Laurales
- Family: Lauraceae
- Genus: Damburneya
- Species: D. cufodontisii

Binomial name
- Damburneya cufodontisii (O.C.Schmidt) Trofimov & Rohwer

Synonyms
- Nectandra cufodontisii (O.C.Schmidt) C.K.Allen; Ocotea cufodontisii O.C.Schmidt; Ocotea seibertii C.K.Allen

Species of flowering plant

Damburneya cufodontisii is a species of plant in the family Lauraceae. It is found in Costa Rica, Nicaragua, and Panama.
