= Damburneya longipetiolata =

Conservation status
- Endangered (IUCN 3.1)

Scientific classification
- Kingdom: Plantae
- Clade: Tracheophytes
- Clade: Angiosperms
- Clade: Magnoliids
- Order: Laurales
- Family: Lauraceae
- Genus: Damburneya
- Species: D. longipetiolata

Binomial name
- Damburneya longipetiolata (van der Werff) Trofimov & Rohwer

Synonyms
- Nectandra longipetiolata van der Werff

Species of flowering plant

Damburneya longipetiolata is a species of plant in the family Lauraceae. It is endemic to Costa Rica.
