= Damburneya bicolor =

Conservation status
- Vulnerable (IUCN 3.1)

Scientific classification
- Kingdom: Plantae
- Clade: Tracheophytes
- Clade: Angiosperms
- Clade: Magnoliids
- Order: Laurales
- Family: Lauraceae
- Genus: Damburneya
- Species: D. bicolor

Binomial name
- Damburneya bicolor (Rohwer) Trofimov & Rohwer

Synonyms
- Nectandra bicolor Rohwer

Species of flowering plant

Damburneya bicolor is a species of plant in the family Lauraceae. It is endemic to Panama. It is threatened by habitat loss.
