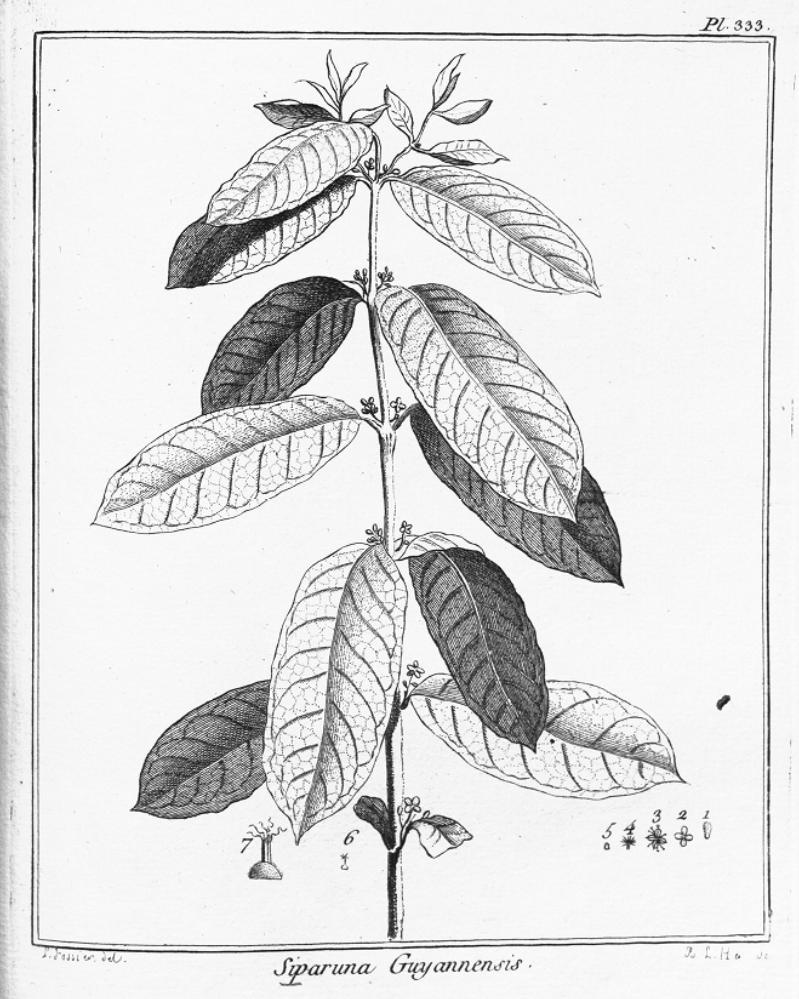
- Siparuna guianensis

Scientific classification
- Kingdom: Plantae
- Clade: Embryophytes
- Clade: Tracheophytes
- Clade: Spermatophytes
- Clade: Angiosperms
- Clade: Magnoliids
- Order: Laurales
- Family: Siparunaceae
- Genus: Siparuna; Aubl. 1775

Species
- see text

Synonyms
- Angelina Pohl ex Tul.; Bracteanthus Ducke; Citrosma Ruiz & Pav.; Conuleum Rich. ex A.Rich.; Jatrops Rottb.

= Siparuna =

Genus of shrubs and trees

Siparuna is a genus of flowering plants belonging to the family Siparunaceae. It includes 53 species of aromatic evergreen trees and shrubs native to the Neotropical realm, ranging from northeastern Mexico through Central America, Trinidad and Tobago, and tropical South America to Paraguay and southern Brazil.

== Species ==
53 species are accepted.

- Siparuna aspera (Ruiz & Pav.) A.DC.
- Siparuna auriculata A.DC.
- Siparuna bifida (Poepp. & Endl.) A.DC.
- Siparuna brasiliensis (Spreng.) A.DC.
- Siparuna calantha (Perkins) S.S.Renner & Hausner
- Siparuna campii S.S.Renner & Hausner
- Siparuna cascada S.S.Renner & Hausner
- Siparuna cervicornis Perkins
- Siparuna conica S.S.Renner & Hausner
- Siparuna cristata (Poepp. & Endl.) A.DC.
- Siparuna croatii S.S.Renner & Hausner
- Siparuna cuspidata (Tul.) A.DC.
- Siparuna cuzcoana Perkins
- Siparuna cymosa Tolm.
- Siparuna decipiens (Tul.) A.DC.
- Siparuna echinata (Kunth) A.DC.
- Siparuna eggersii Hieron.
- Siparuna ficoides S.S.Renner & Hausner
- Siparuna gentryana S.S.Renner
- Siparuna gesnerioides (Kunth) A.DC.
- Siparuna gigantotepala S.S.Renner & Hausner
- Siparuna glabrescens (C.Presl) A.DC.
- Siparuna glycycarpa (Ducke) S.S.Renner & Hausner
- Siparuna grandiflora (Kunth) Perkins
- Siparuna guajalitensis S.S.Renner & Hausner
- Siparuna guianensis Aubl.
- Siparuna harlingii S.S.Renner & Hausner
- Siparuna krukovii A.C.Sm.
- Siparuna laurifolia (Kunth) A.DC.
- Siparuna lepidota (Kunth) A.DC.
- Siparuna lozaniana S.S.Renner & Hausner
- Siparuna macrotepala Perkins
- Siparuna multiflora S.S.Renner & Hausner
- Siparuna muricata (Ruiz & Pav.) A.DC.
- Siparuna ovalis (Ruiz & Pav.) A.DC.
- Siparuna pachyantha A.C.Sm.
- Siparuna palenquensis S.S.Renner & Hausner
- Siparuna pauciflora (Beurl.) A.DC.
- Siparuna petasiformis Jangoux
- Siparuna petiolaris (Kunth) A.DC.
- Siparuna piloso-lepidota Heilb.
- Siparuna poeppigii (Tul.) A.DC.
- Siparuna reginae (Tul.) A.DC.
- Siparuna schimpffii Diels
- Siparuna sessiliflora (Kunth) A.DC.
- Siparuna stellulata Perkins
- Siparuna subinodora (Ruiz & Pav.) A.DC.
- Siparuna thecaphora (Poepp. & Endl.) A.DC.
- Siparuna tomentosa (Ruiz & Pav.) A.DC.
- Siparuna vasqueziana S.S.Renner & Hausner
