= Aiouea bracteata =

Conservation status
- Endangered (IUCN 3.1)

Scientific classification
- Kingdom: Plantae
- Clade: Tracheophytes
- Clade: Angiosperms
- Clade: Magnoliids
- Order: Laurales
- Family: Lauraceae
- Genus: Aiouea
- Species: A. bracteata

Binomial name
- Aiouea bracteata Kosterm.

Synonyms
- Aiouea schwackeana Mez in Beibl.; Aiouea severinii Mez

Species of flowering plant

Aiouea bracteata is a species of flowering plant in the family Lauraceae. It a tree endemic to southeastern Brazil, where it ranges from southern Minas Gerais to São Paulo states.
