= Aiouea macedoana =

Conservation status
- Data Deficient (IUCN 3.1)

Scientific classification
- Kingdom: Plantae
- Clade: Tracheophytes
- Clade: Angiosperms
- Clade: Magnoliids
- Order: Laurales
- Family: Lauraceae
- Genus: Aiouea
- Species: A. macedoana

Binomial name
- Aiouea macedoana Vattimo-Gil

Species of flowering plant

Aiouea macedoana is a species of flowering plant in the family Lauraceae. It is a tree known only from Natividade municipality in Tocantins state in northern Brazil. It is native to Cerrado savanna, where it can grow up to 25 meters tall.

The species was first described by Ida de Vattimo-Gil in 1967.
