= Caroline Kathryn Allen =

American botanist (1904–1975)

- Born: April 7, 1904; Pawling, New York, U.S.
- Died: April 5, 1975 (aged 70); Chapel Hill, North Carolina, U.S.
- Education: Washington University in St. Louis; Vassar College
- Scientific career
- Fields: Botany; Taxonomy

Caroline Kathryn Allen (April 7, 1904 – April 6, 1975) was an American botanist, botanical illustrator and taxonomist noted for studying trees in the laurel family. She was a staff member at both the Arnold Arboretum and New York Botanical Garden. She described over 275 species, and contributed widely in academic publications. The standard author abbreviation C.K.Allen is used to indicate this person as the author when citing a botanical name.

== Early life ==
Allen was born in Pawling, New York, to Howard N. Allen, a New York State Assembly member, and Ruth Ann (Howard) Allen. In college, she studied botany and chemistry, and in 1926 she earned her bachelor's degree from Vassar College. After college, she worked as an herbarium assistant at Harvard's Arnold Arboretum for a year before attending graduate school. She received both her master's (1929) and PhD (1932) degrees from Washington University in St. Louis, before returning to work at the Arnold Arboretum.

== Career ==
Upon returning to the Arnold Arboretum in 1932, Allen was tasked with developing taxonomic treatments on the genus Lauraceae using specimens gathered from Southeast Asia and the Pacific Islands. Following WWII, Allen switched to Lauraceae from Central and South America, contributing Lauraceae treatments to books on flora of Panama and Guyana. Allen resigned in 1948 and spent the next eleven years caring for ailing family members, though in her spare time she examined incoming Lauraceae specimens for the New York Botanical Garden. In 1959, she returned to full-time work as a research assistant for the New York Botanical Garden. Supported by a series of National Science Foundation grants, Allen conducted field surveys in Brazil, Mexico, Trinidad and Tobago, and Venezuela, as well as herbaria surveys across Europe. She retired in 1974.
