= Susanne Renner =

German botanist

Susanne Sabine Renner
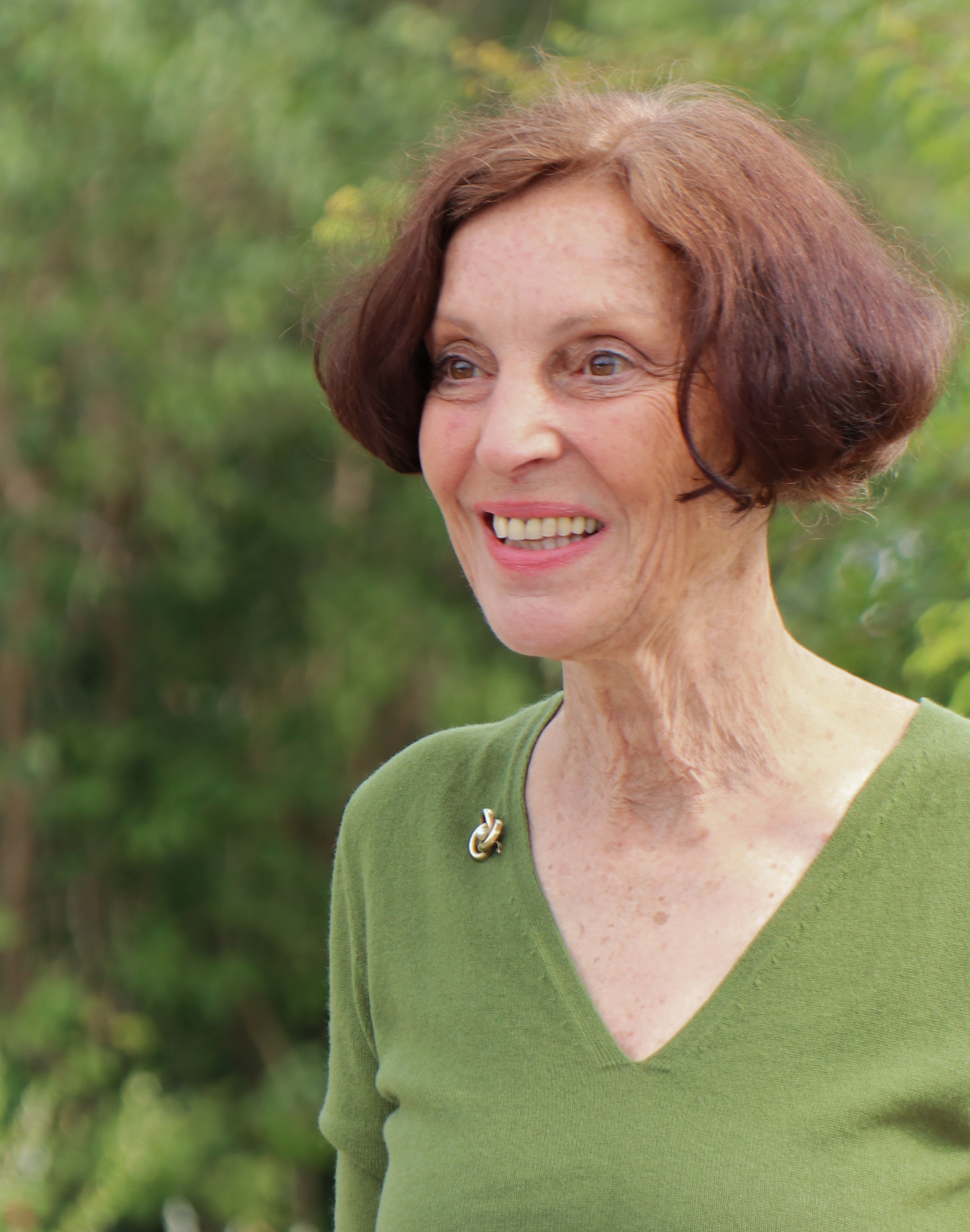
- Photo of Susanne Renner
- Born: October 5, 1954 (age 71); Tübingen
- Education: University of Hamburg
- Scientific career
- Thesis: Phänologie, Blütenbiologie und Rekombinationssysteme einiger zentralamazonischer Melastomataceen (1984)

Susanne Sabine Renner is a German botanist. Until October 2020, she was a professor of biology at LMU Munich as well as director of the Botanische Staatssammlung München and the Botanischer Garten München-Nymphenburg. Since January 2021, she lives in St. Louis, where she is an Honorary Professor of Biology at Washington University in St. Louis and a Research Associate at the Missouri Botanical Garden.

== Education ==
Renner received her M.Sc. degree in biology in 1980 and her Ph.D. in 1984, both from the University of Hamburg. She qualified as Professor in Systematic Botany in 1992.

== Career ==
From 1987 to 1992 Renner was associate professor at the Botanical Institute at the Aarhus University. From 1993 to 1996, she was Professor at the University of Mainz. From 1996 to 2006, she was professor at University of Missouri–St. Louis, affiliated with one of the largest botanical gardens worldwide, the Missouri Botanical Garden. Since 2003, she is professor for systematic botany at LMU Munich as well as director of the Botanische Staatssammlung München, the Botanischer Garten München-Nymphenburg and the University Herbarium (MSB). As of 2021, she retains an emeritus position at LMU Munich and is an honorary professor in the Arts and Sciences at Washington University in St. Louis.

== Research ==
Renner's research interests focus on the phylogenetics, mating system evolution, and biogeography of flowering plants, in both temperate and tropical regions. Renner's early research was on the phylogeny and reproductive biology of plants. She has also worked on dioecy and sex chromosomes in plants. The use of genetic tools enables Renner to track the movement of plants across ocean basins, define the separation of land masses following the breakup of Pangaea 153 million years ago, and define the origin of agricultural crops including cucumbers and melons and gourds. Renner's work on watermelons revealed that they originate from the northeast Africa in the Kordofan area and not South Africa as previously indicated. She has tracked the relationship between Philidris nagasau ants and Squamellaria plants over the past 3 million years, an interaction that is a type of farming because the ants place seeds into tree bark and then return later to eat the resulting growth. Her research followed the co-evolution between sword-billed hummingbirds and passion flowers, an interaction that has been gained and lost multiple times over the past 11 million years. In urban areas, her research on bees, how they collect pollen, and the role of flower strips in attracting bees is relevant given the impact of climate change on interactions between plants and insects.

== Selected publications ==
- Renner, Susanne S. (1993). "Phylogeny and classification of the Melastomataceae and Memecylaceae". Nordic Journal of Botany. 13 (5): 519–540. Bibcode:1993NorJB..13..519R. doi:10.1111/j.1756-1051.1993.tb00096.x. ISSN 1756-1051.
- Renner, Susanne S.; Ricklefs, Robert E. (1995). "Dioecy and its correlates in the flowering plants". American Journal of Botany. 82 (5): 596–606. Bibcode:1995AmJB...82..596R. doi:10.1002/j.1537-2197.1995.tb11504.x. ISSN 1537-2197.
- Chanderbali, Andre S.; van der Werff, Henk; Renner, Susanne S. (2001). "Phylogeny and Historical Biogeography of Lauraceae: Evidence from the Chloroplast and Nuclear Genomes". Annals of the Missouri Botanical Garden. 88 (1): 104–134. Bibcode:2001AnMBG..88..104C. doi:10.2307/2666133. ISSN 0026-6493. JSTOR 2666133.
- Sebastian, Patrizia; Schaefer, Hanno; Telford, Ian R. H.; Renner, Susanne S. (2010-08-10). "Cucumber (Cucumis sativus) and melon (C. melo) have numerous wild relatives in Asia and Australia, and the sister species of melon is from Australia". Proceedings of the National Academy of Sciences. 107 (32): 14269–14273. Bibcode:2010PNAS..10714269S. doi:10.1073/pnas.1005338107. ISSN 0027-8424. PMC 2922565. PMID 20656934.
- Renner, Susanne S. (2014). "The relative and absolute frequencies of angiosperm sexual systems: Dioecy, monoecy, gynodioecy, and an updated online database". American Journal of Botany. 101 (10): 1588–1596. doi:10.3732/ajb.1400196. ISSN 1537-2197. PMID 25326608.

== Awards ==
Renner is a member of several notable science academies. In 1999, she was elected to the Bavarian Academy of Sciences and Humanities. In 2005 she was elected as a foreign member to the Royal Danish Academy of Sciences and Letters. In 2009 she was elected to Academy of Sciences Leopoldina in Germany. In 2018 she was elected to the American Academy of Arts and Sciences. In 2021, she was elected corresponding member of the Gesellschaft Naturforschender Freunde zu Berlin (founded in 1773). From 2011 to 2020, she was President of the Bavarian Botanical Society.

== Personal life ==
Renner was married to American ornithologist and ecologist Robert Ricklefs until his death in 2026.
