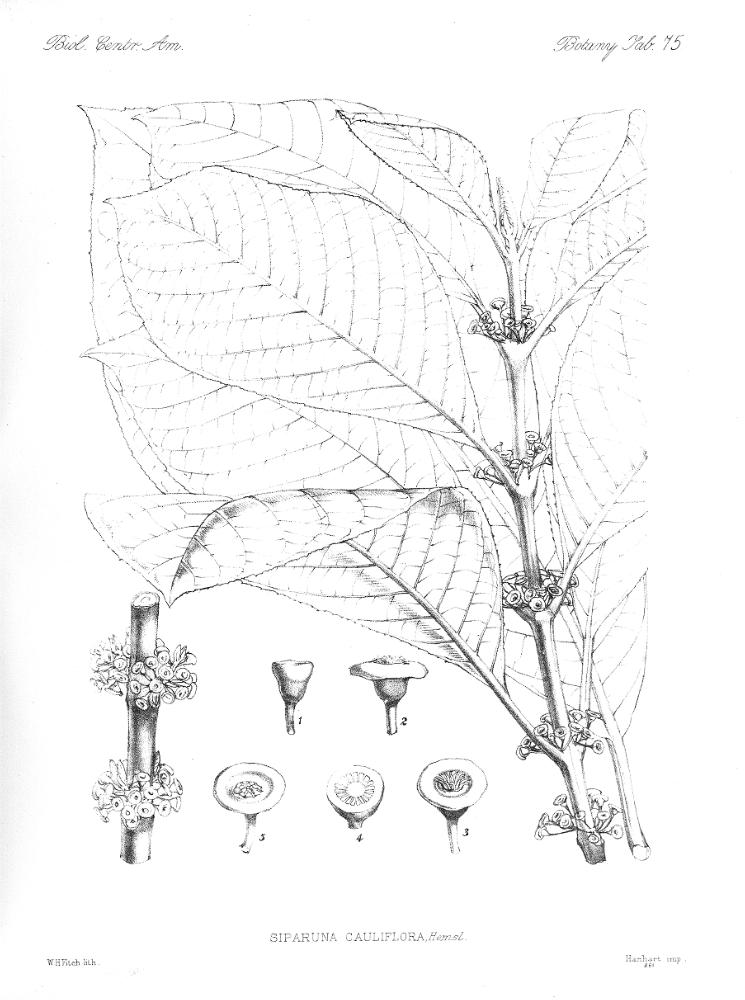
- Siparuna cauliflora

Scientific classification
- Kingdom: Plantae
- Clade: Tracheophytes
- Clade: Angiosperms
- Clade: Magnoliids
- Order: Laurales
- Family: Siparunaceae (A.DC.) Schodde (1970)

Genera
- Glossocalyx Benth.; Siparuna Aubl.

= Siparunaceae =

Family of flowering plants

Siparunaceae is a family of flowering plants in the magnoliid order Laurales. It consists of two genera of woody plants, with essential oils: Glossocalyx in West Africa and Siparuna in the neotropics. Glossocalyx is monospecific (Glossocalyx longicuspis) and Siparuna has about 74 known species.

Until the 1990s, most taxonomists placed Glossocalyx and Siparuna in the family Monimiaceae. The monograph of Monimiaceae by William R. Philipson in 1993 was the last major work to do so. In the 1990s, molecular phylogenetic studies of DNA sequences showed that Monimiaceae, as then circumscribed, was paraphyletic. When the Angiosperm Phylogeny Group published their APG system in 1998, the old Monimiaceae was divided into three separate families: Siparunaceae, Atherospermataceae, and Monimiaceae sensu stricto. This classification remained unchanged in the APG III system of 2009 and the APG IV system of 2016.

The families Siparunaceae, Gomortegaceae, and Atherospermataceae form one of the three major clades that constitute the order Laurales. Siparunaceae is sister to the clade composed of Gomortegaceae and Atherospermataceae.

In 1898, Janet Russell Perkins began a series of articles on Monimiaceae, but only two were ever completed. The second of these was mis-titled as part III on its first page (compare to table of contents therein) and covers the genus Siparuna.
