= List of the orchids of Ireland =

This is an annotated list of the orchids found in Ireland.

== Genus Anacamptis Rich. ==
- Anacamptis morio (Linnaeus) R.M.Bateman, Pridgeon & M.W.Chase.

Distribution. Southern half of Ireland but not Southwest Map Status. Endangered.

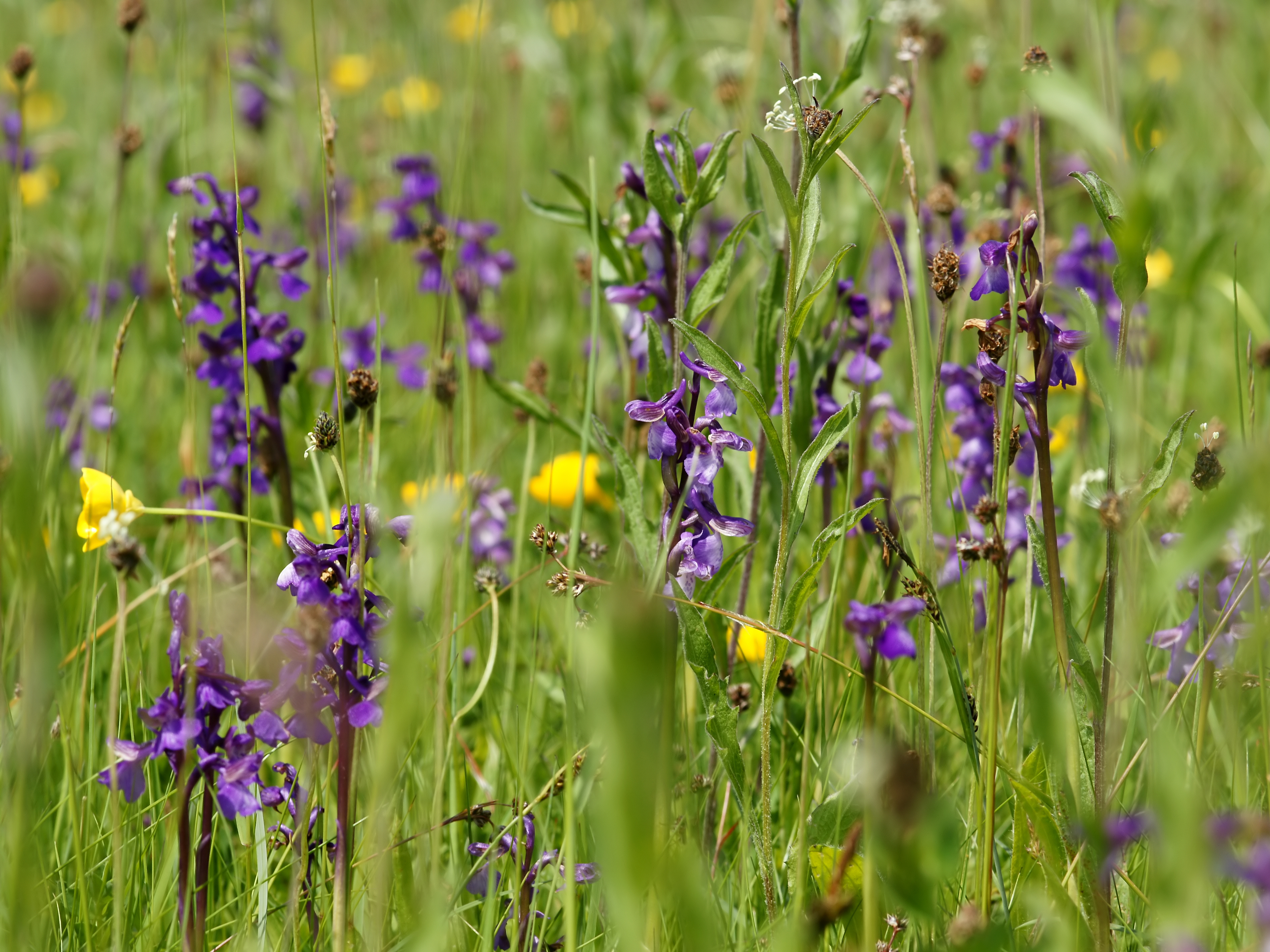
Anacamptis morio Habitat
- EOL images of Anacamptis morio
- Anacamptis pyramidalis (Linnaeus) Richard.

Distribution. Most of Ireland.Map

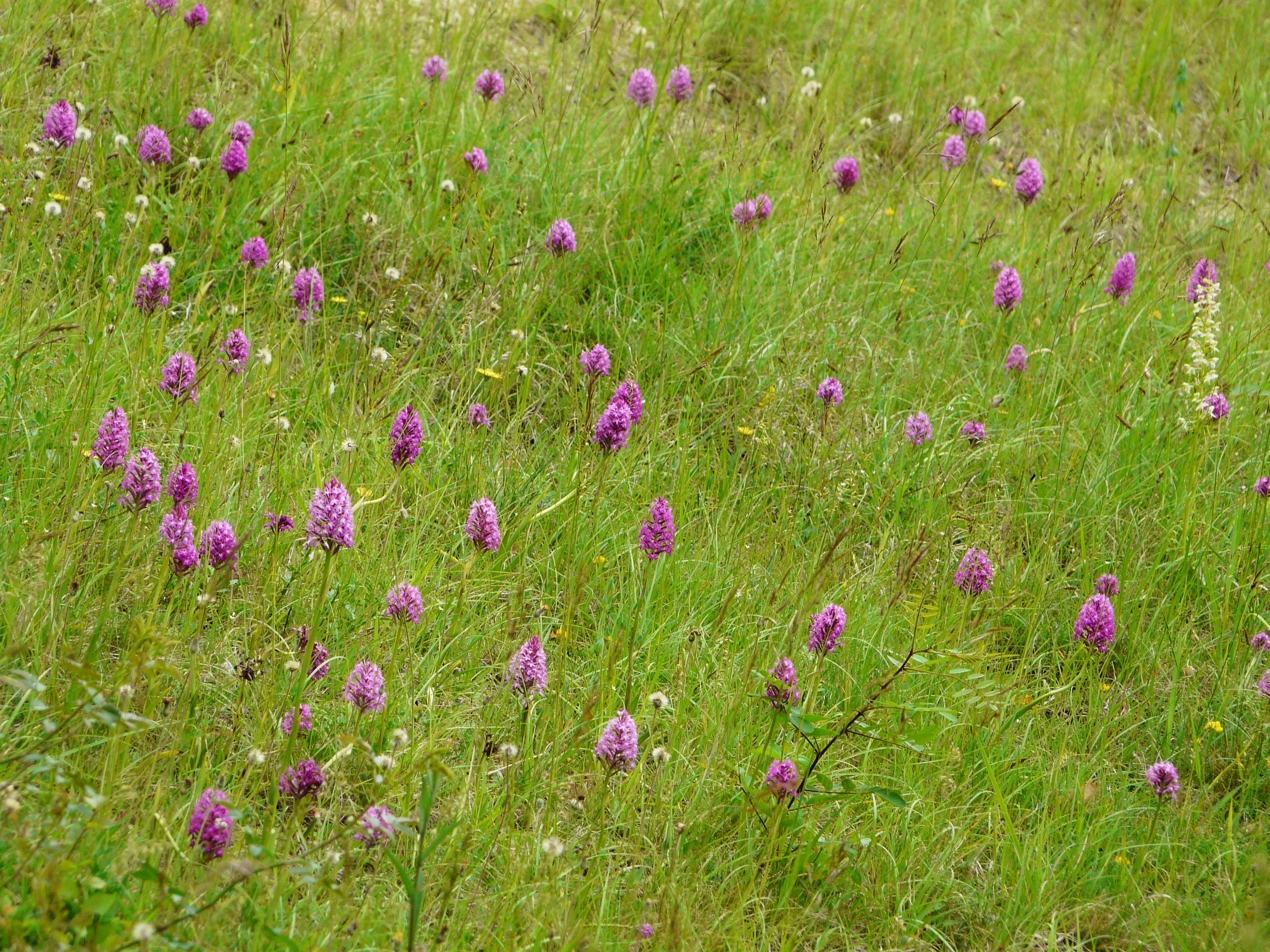
Anacamptis pyramidalis Habitat

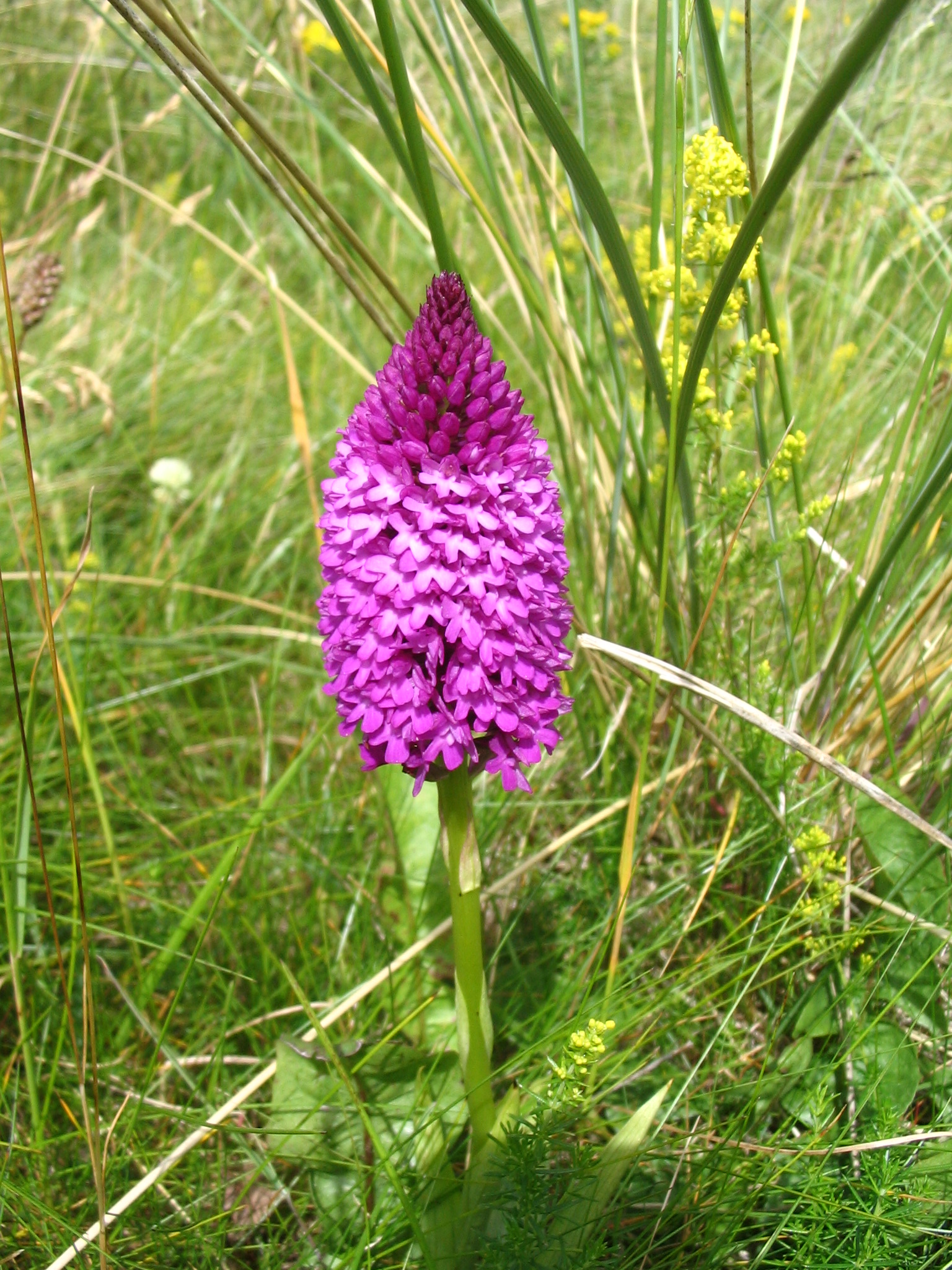
Anacamptis pyramidalis Donegal
- EOL images of Anacamptis pyramidalis

== Genus Cephalanthera L.C.M. Richard ==
- Cephalanthera longifolia (Linnaeus) Fritsch.

Distribution.Scattered over Ireland. Extinct Northern Ireland Map Status.Endangered.

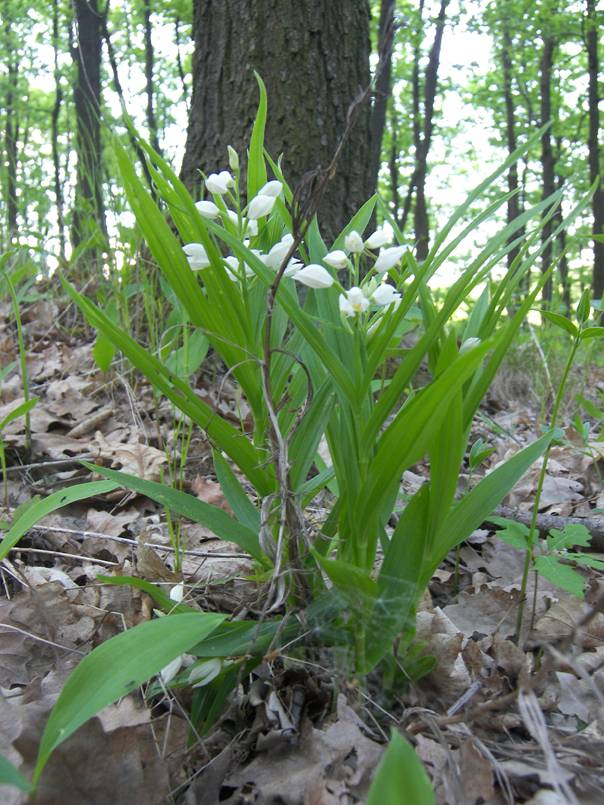
- EOL images of Cephalanthera longifolia

== Genus Coeloglossum Hartm. ==
valid combination Dactylorhiza viridis

== Genus Dactylorhiza Necker ex Nevski ==
- Dactylorhiza fuchsii (Druce) Soó.

Distribution. All of Ireland Map

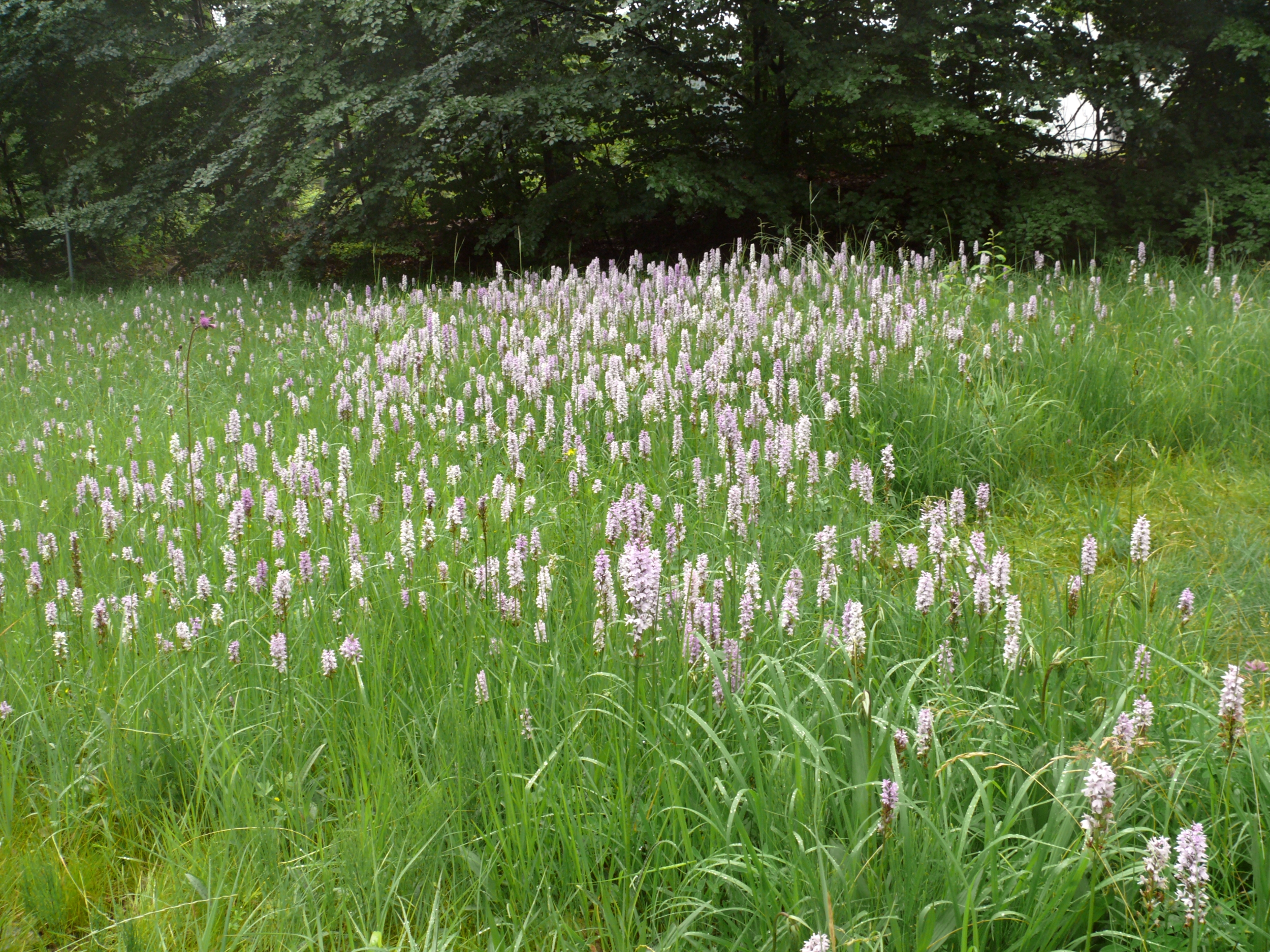
Dactylorhiza fuchsii Habitat

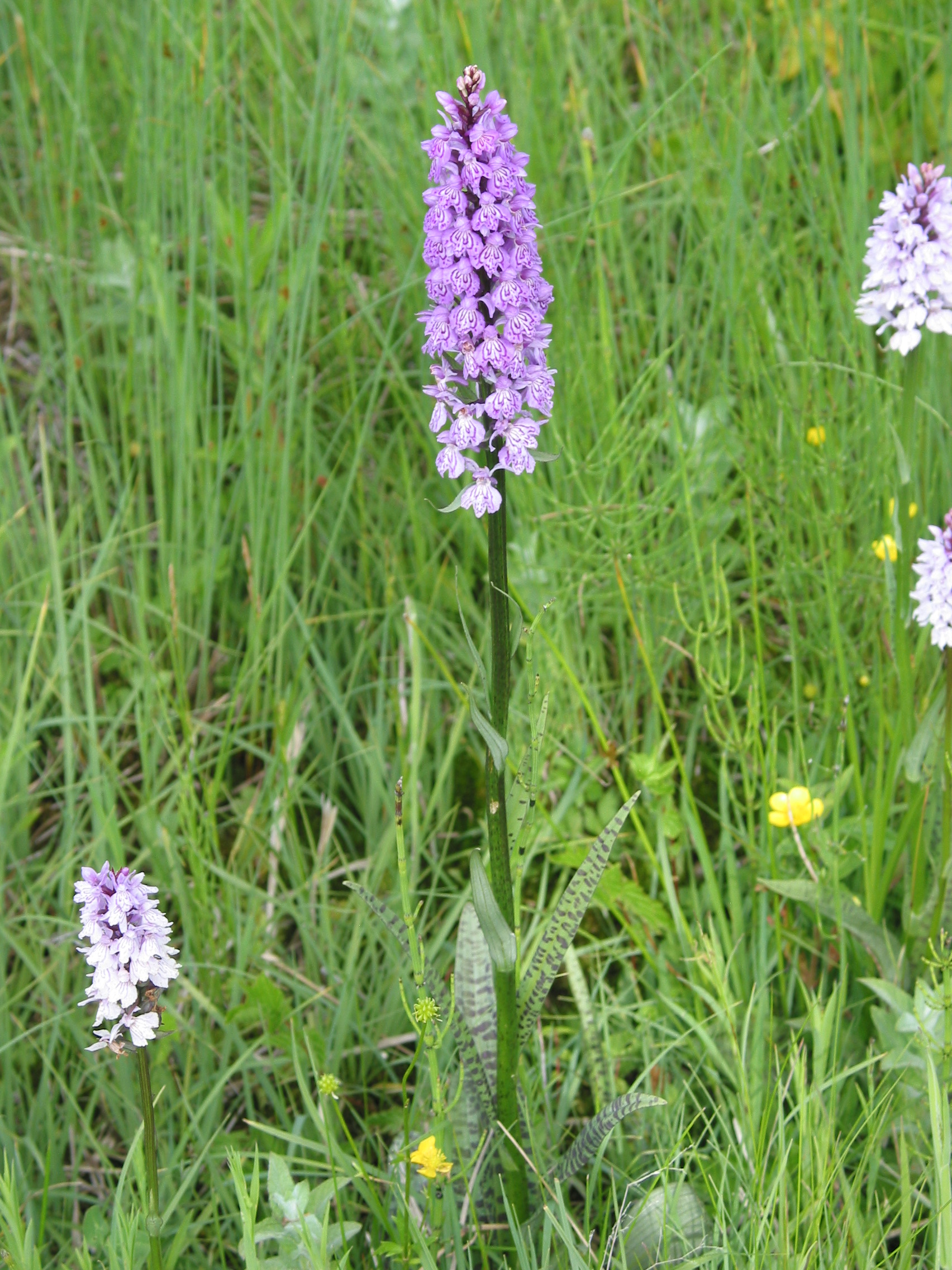
Dactylorhiza fuchsii
- EOL images of Dactylorhiza fuchsii
- Dactylorhiza fuchsii subspecies hebridensis (Wilmott) Soó
- Dactylorhiza fuchsii subspecies fuchsii (Druce) Soó
- Dactylorhiza fuchsii subspecies okellyi (Druce) Soó
- Dactylorhiza incarnata (Linnaeus) Soó.

Distribution.All of Ireland Map

- Dactylorhiza incarnata subspecies cruenta (O.F. Müller) Soó See Kew World Checklist

Distribution Map

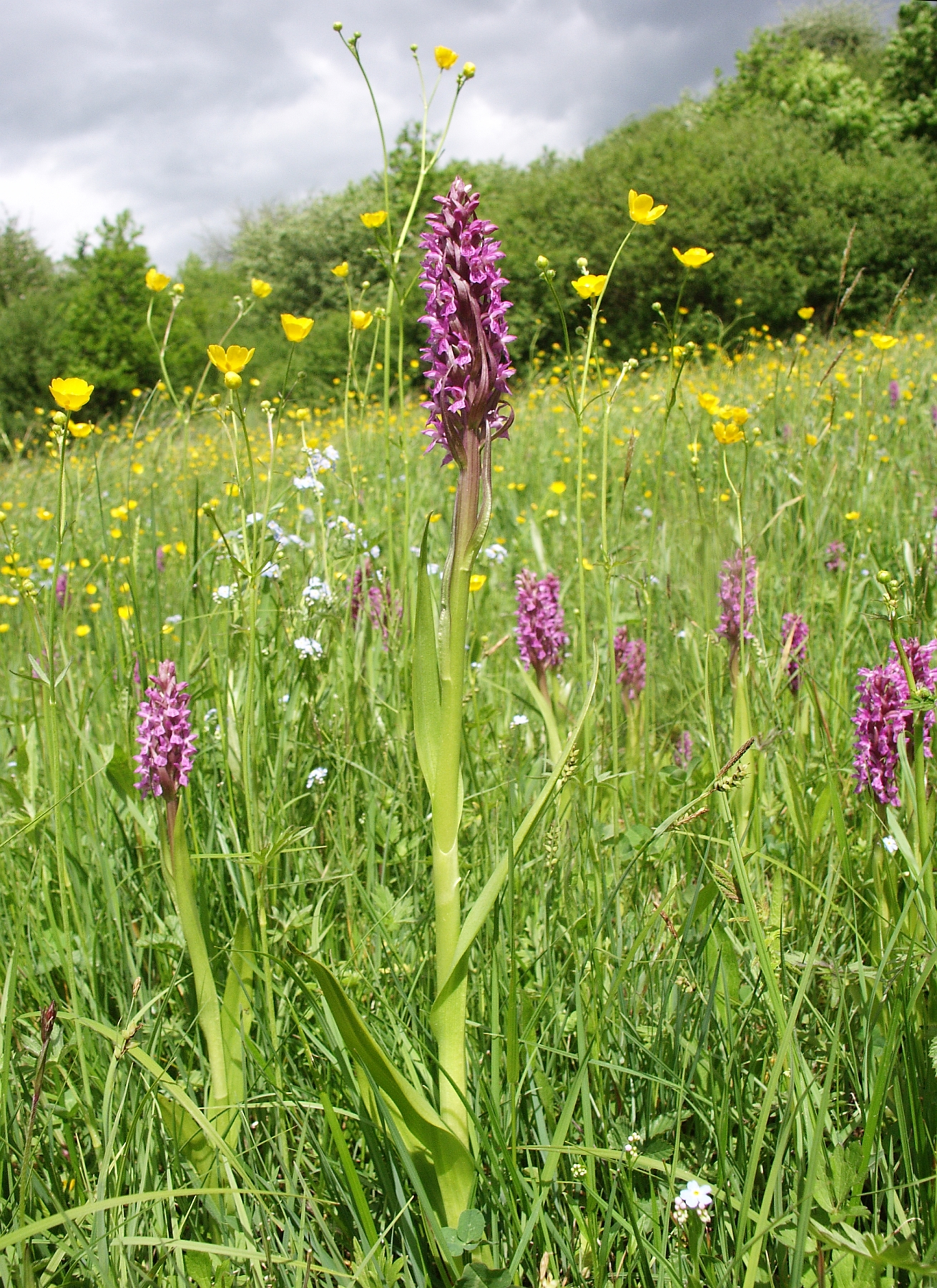
Dactylorhiza incarnata Habitat

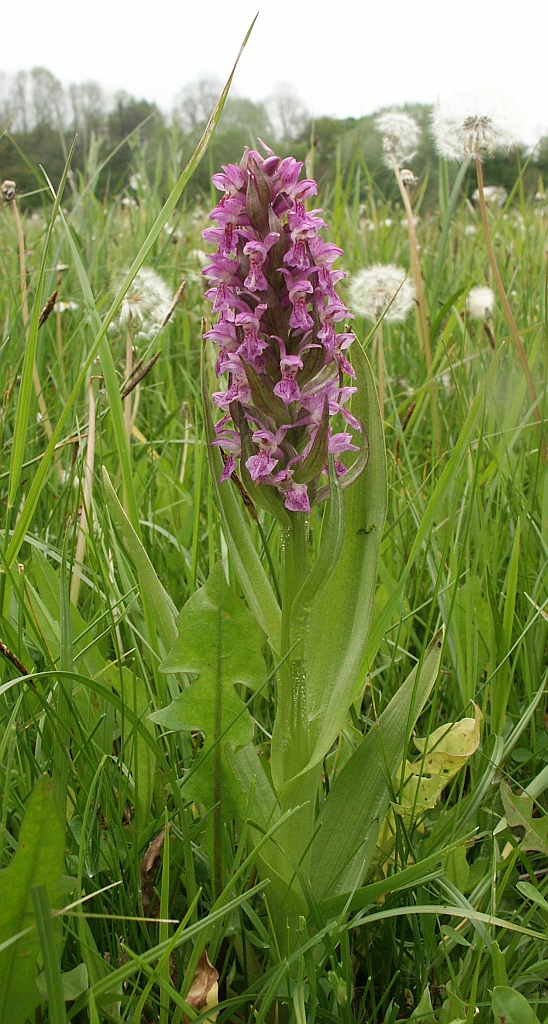
Dactylorhiza incarnata
- EOL images of Dactylorhiza incarnata
- Dactylorhiza incarnata subspecies coccinea (Pugsley) Soó
- Dactylorhiza incarnata subspecies incarnata (Linnaeus)
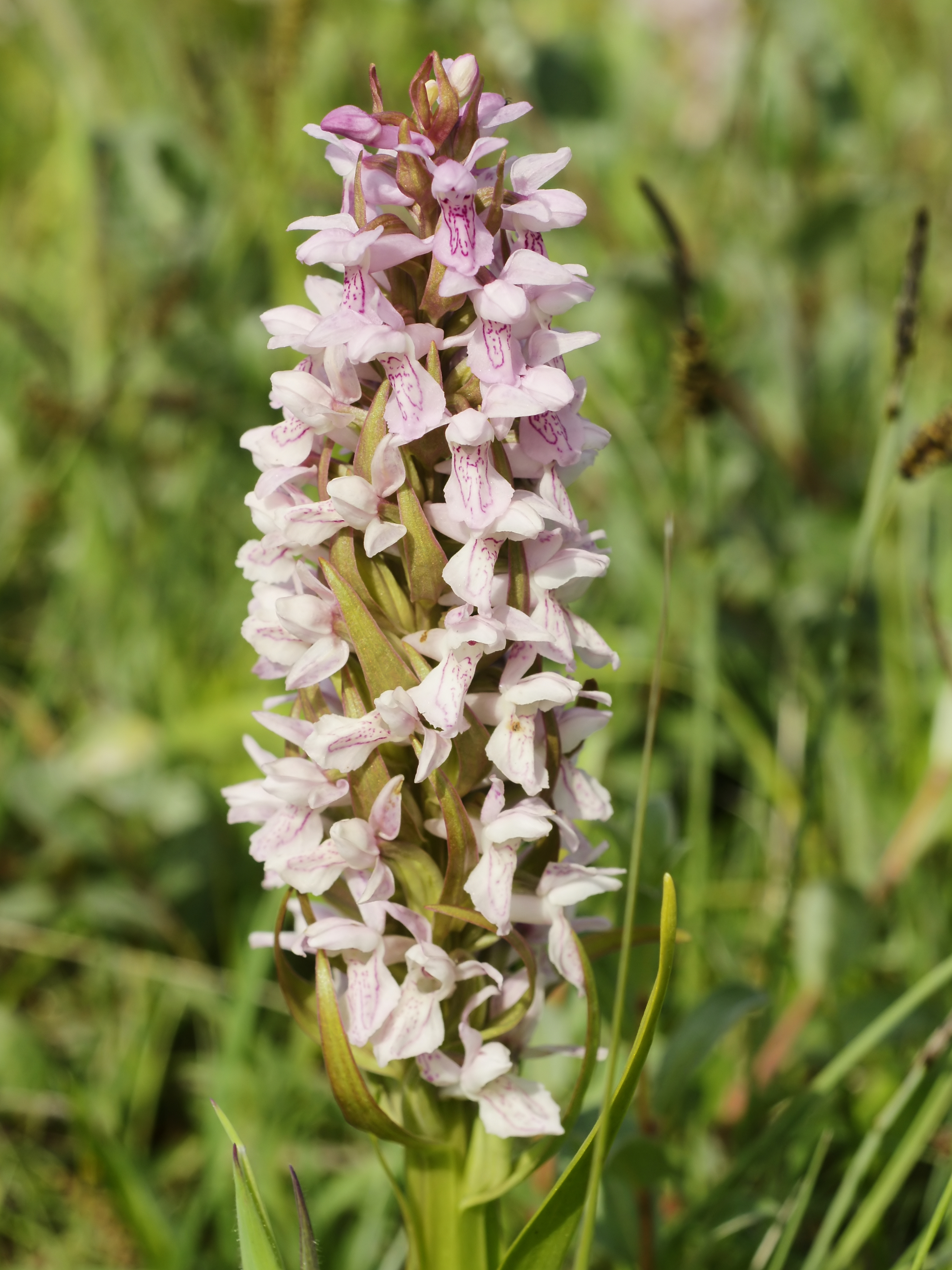
Dactylorhiza incarnata forma rosea
- Dactylorhiza incarnata subspecies pulchella (Druce) Soó
- Dactylorhiza maculata auctorum hibernicorum.

Distribution. All of Ireland Map

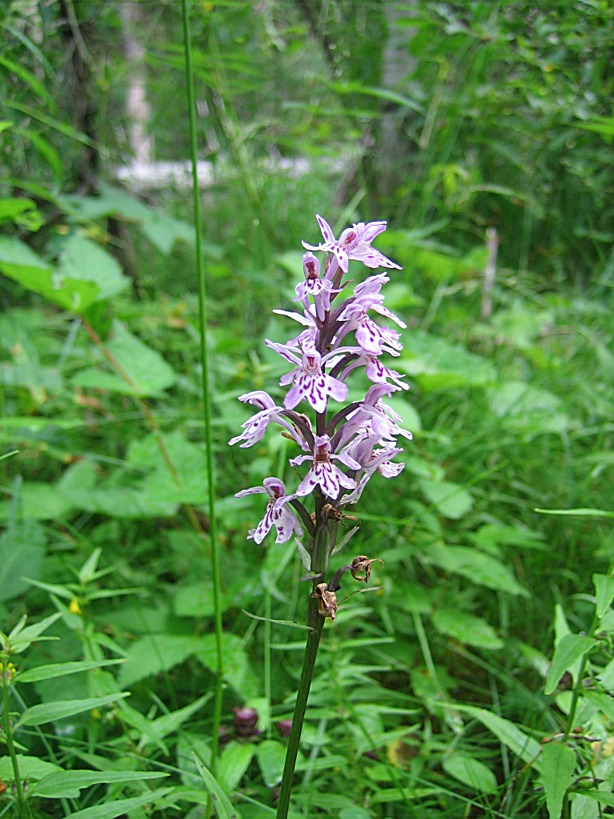
Dactylorhiza maculata Habitat

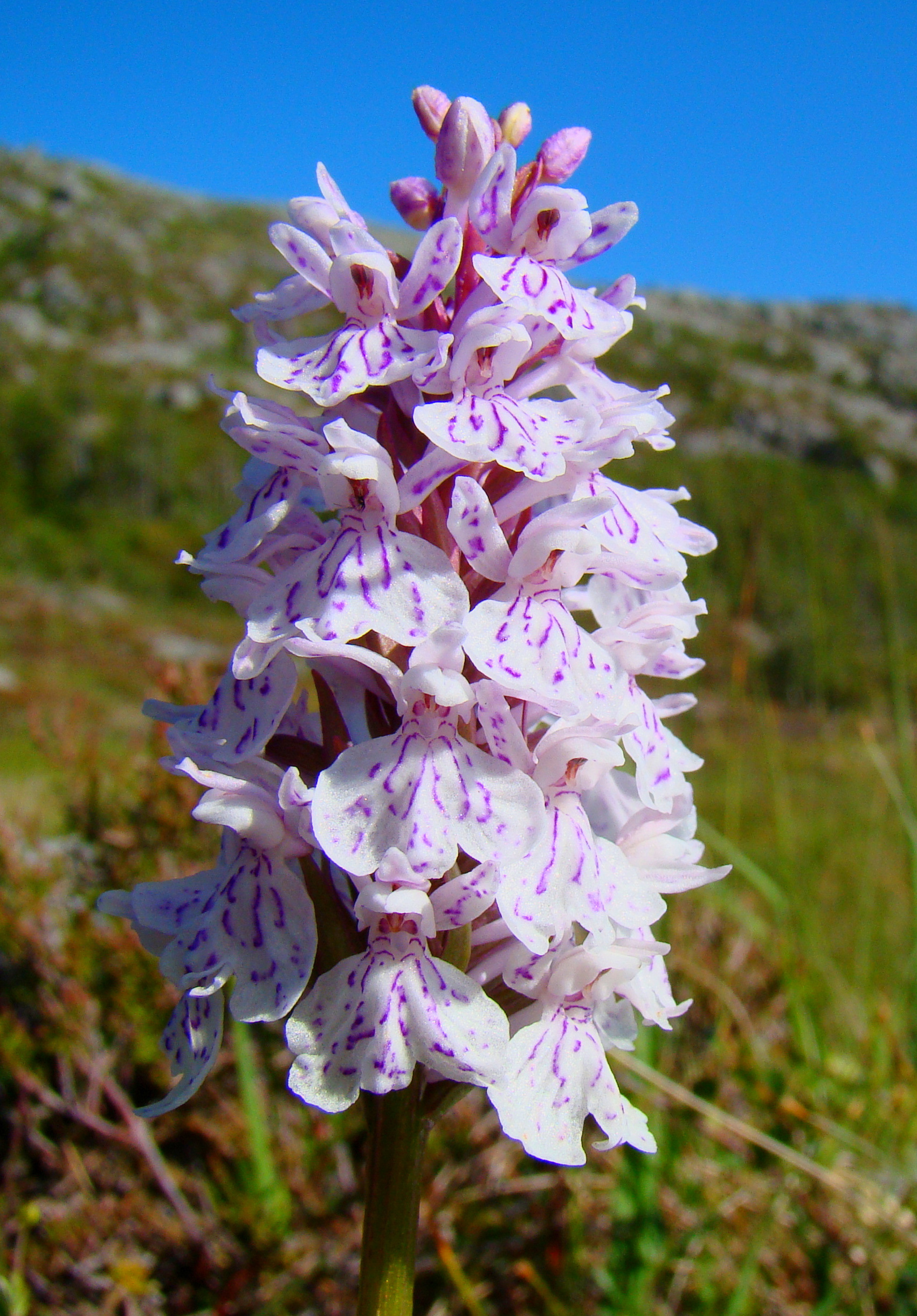
Dactylorhiza maculata
- EOL images of Dactylorhiza maculata
- Dactylorhiza majalis (Reichenb.) Hunt & Summerhayes.

Distribution. Widespread Map

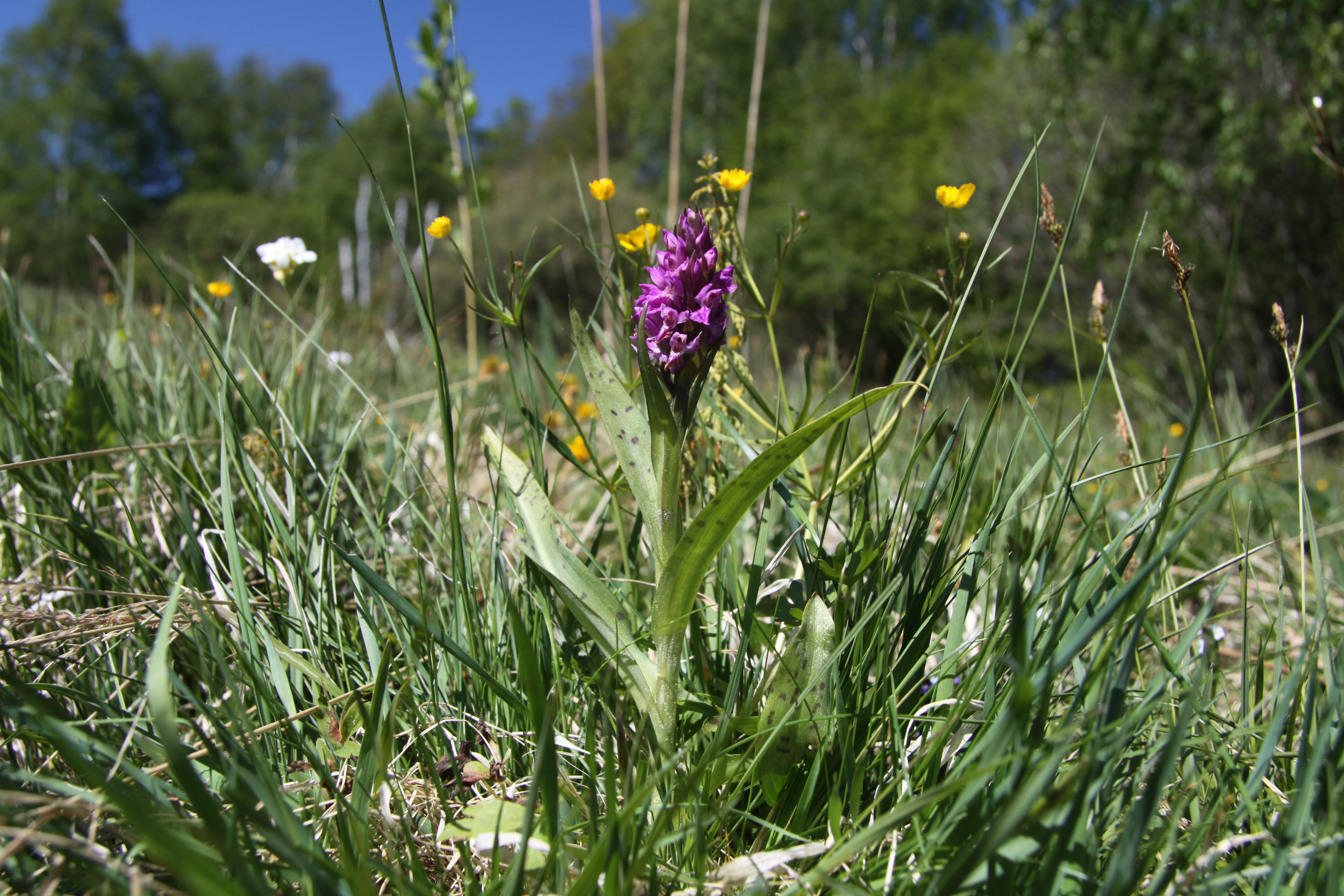
Dactylorhiza majalis Habitat

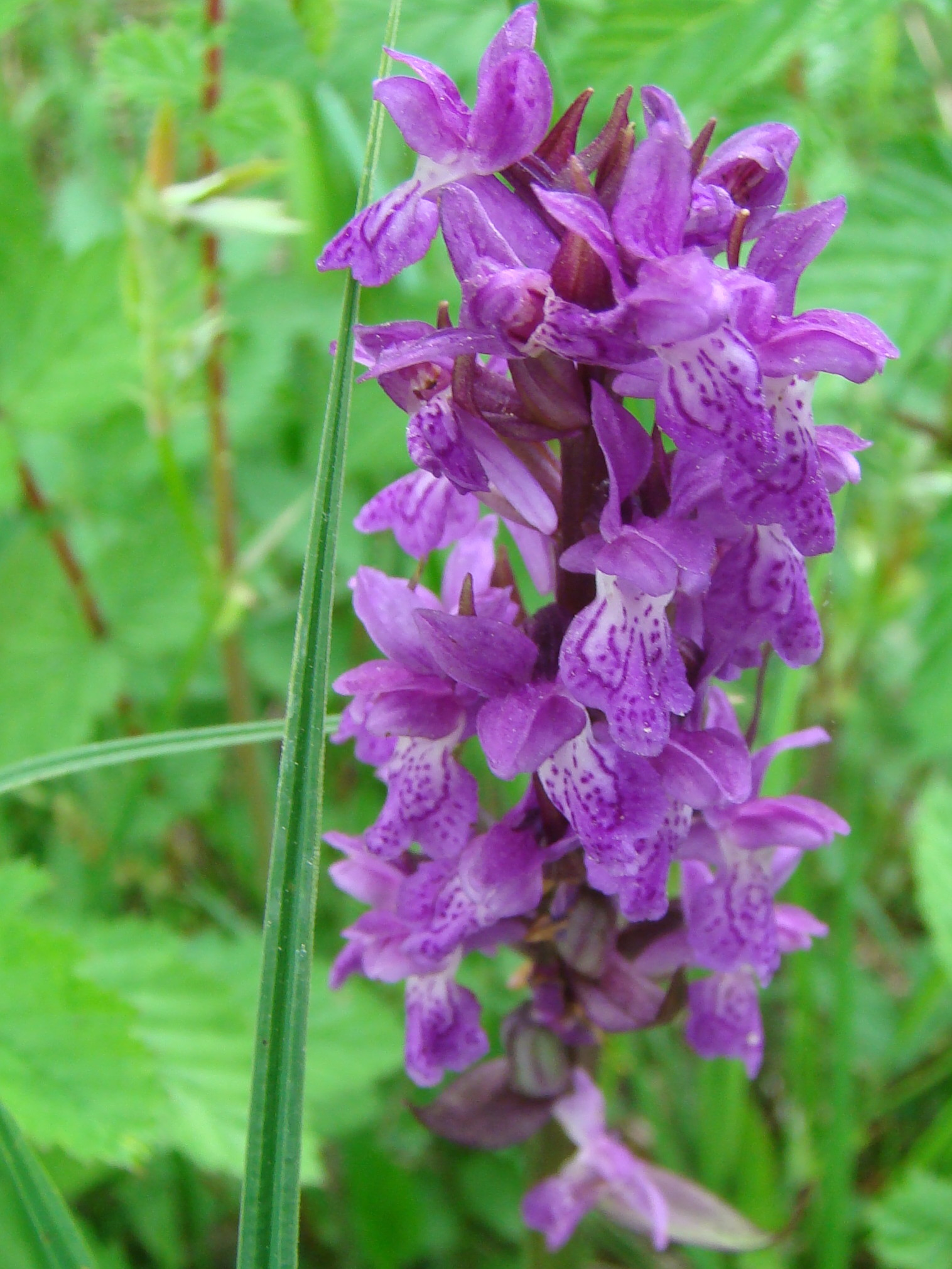
Dactylorhiza majalis
- EOL images of Dactylorhiza majalis
- Dactylorhiza majalis subspecies occidentalis (Pugsley) P. Delforge Synonym of Dactylorhiza kerryensis (Wilmott) P.F. Hunt & Summerhayes. See Kew World Checklist and

Distribution. Western, Northern and Central Ireland Map

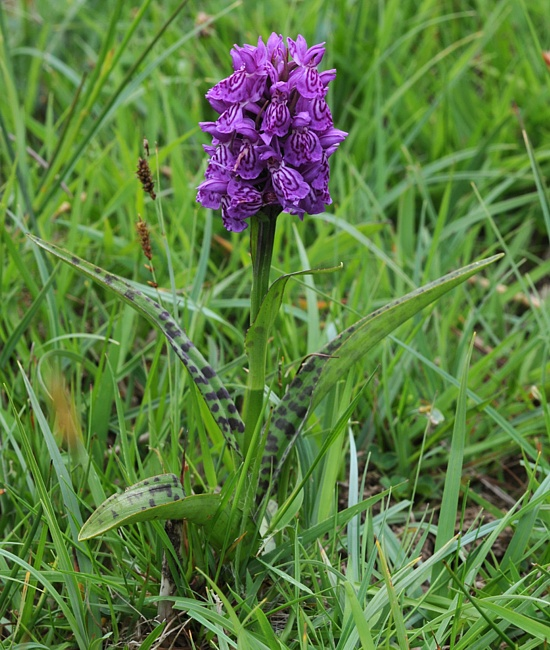
Dactylorhiza occidentalis Burren Habitus

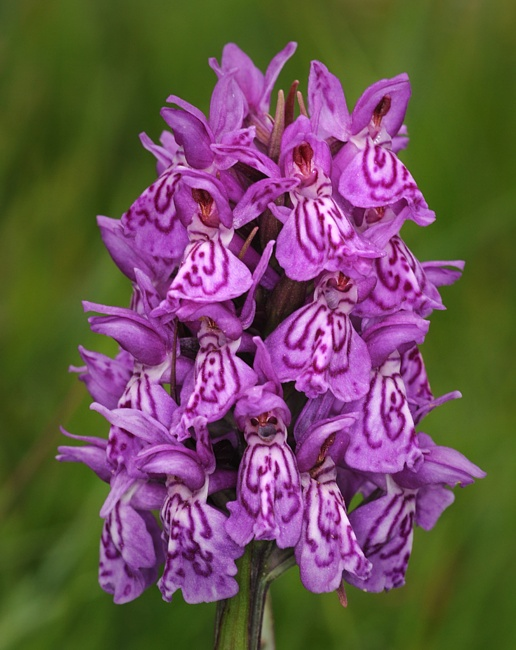
Dactylorhiza occidentalis inflorescence
- Dactylorhiza purpurella (T. Stephenson & T.A. Stephenson) Soó

Distribution. All Ireland. Mainly North Map

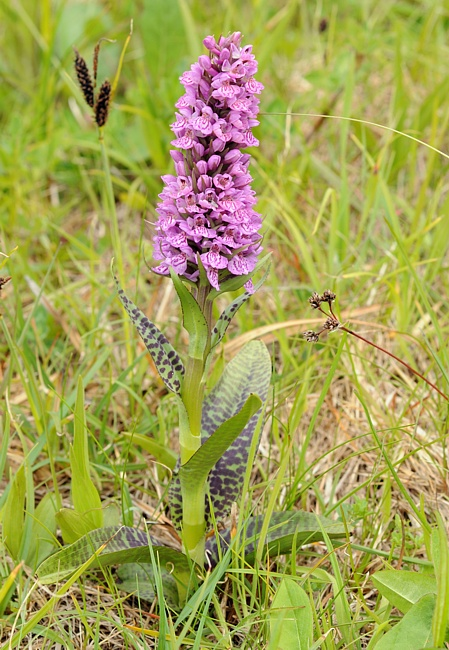
Dactylorhiza purpurella Habitat

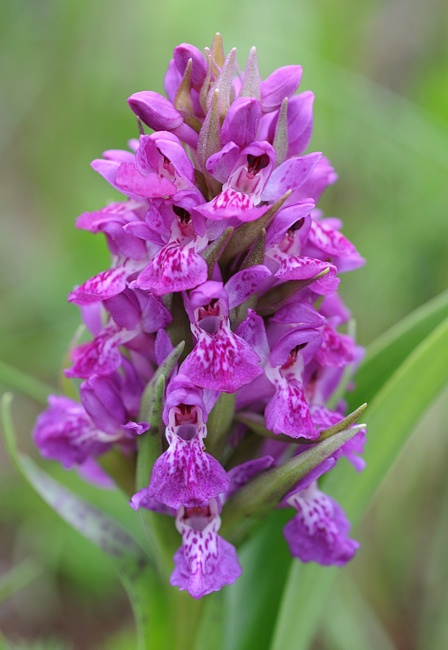
Dactylorhiza purpurella Inflorescence
- EOL images of Dactylorhiza purpurella
- Dactylorhiza traunsteineri (Sauter) Soó. Distribution. All Ireland.Scattered.Map
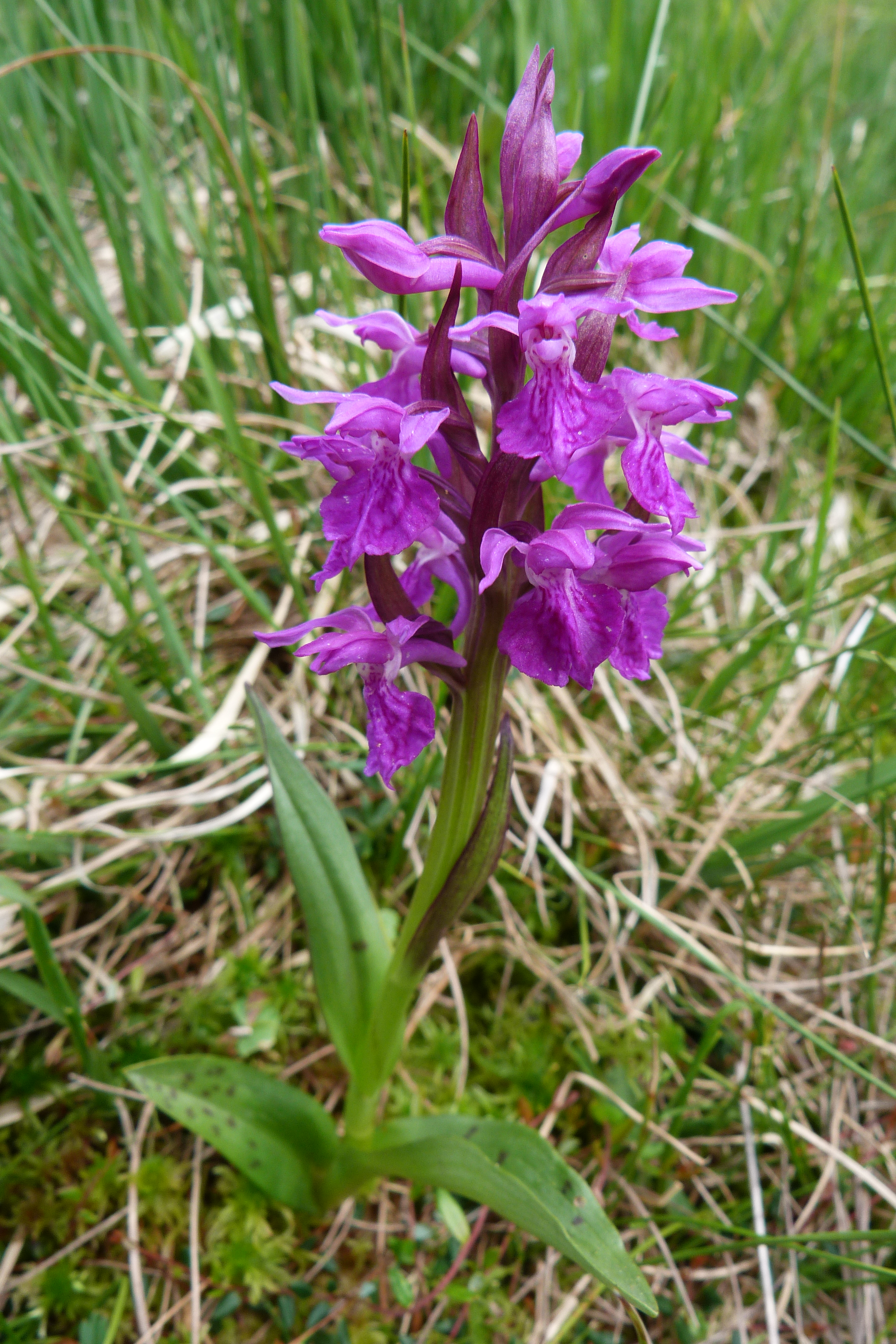
Dactylorhiza traunsteineri. Habitus

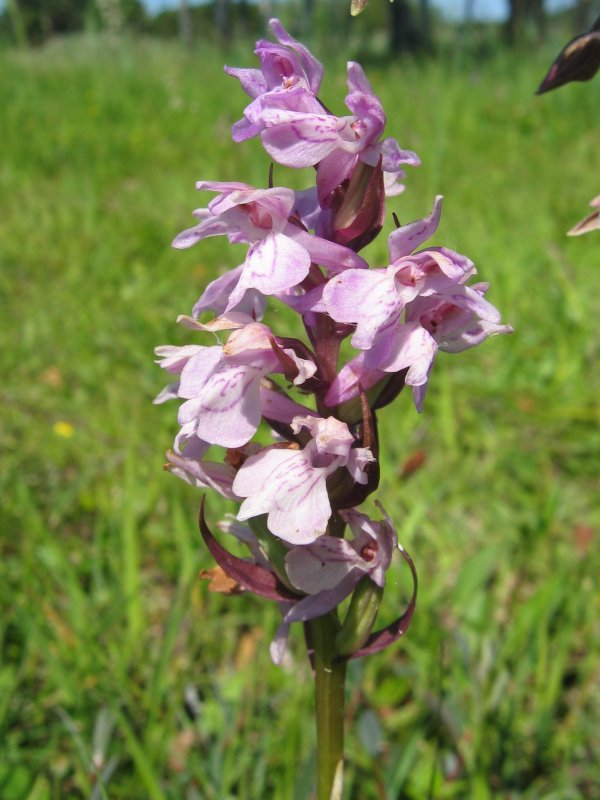
Dactylorhiza traunsteineri Inflorescence
- EOL images of Dactylorhiza traunsteineri
- Dactylorhiza viridis (Linnaeus) R.M.Bateman, Pridgeon & M.W.Chase synonym Coeloglossum viride (Linnaeus) Hartman.

Distribution. All Ireland.Map

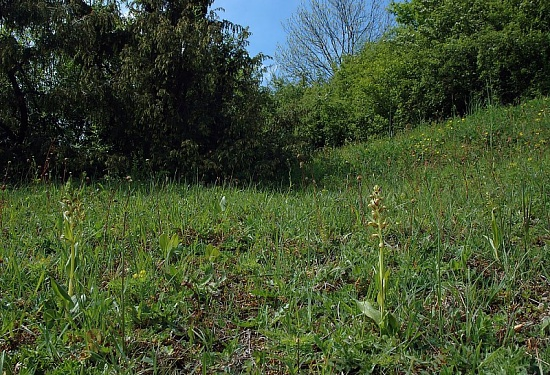
Dactylorhiza viridis Habitat

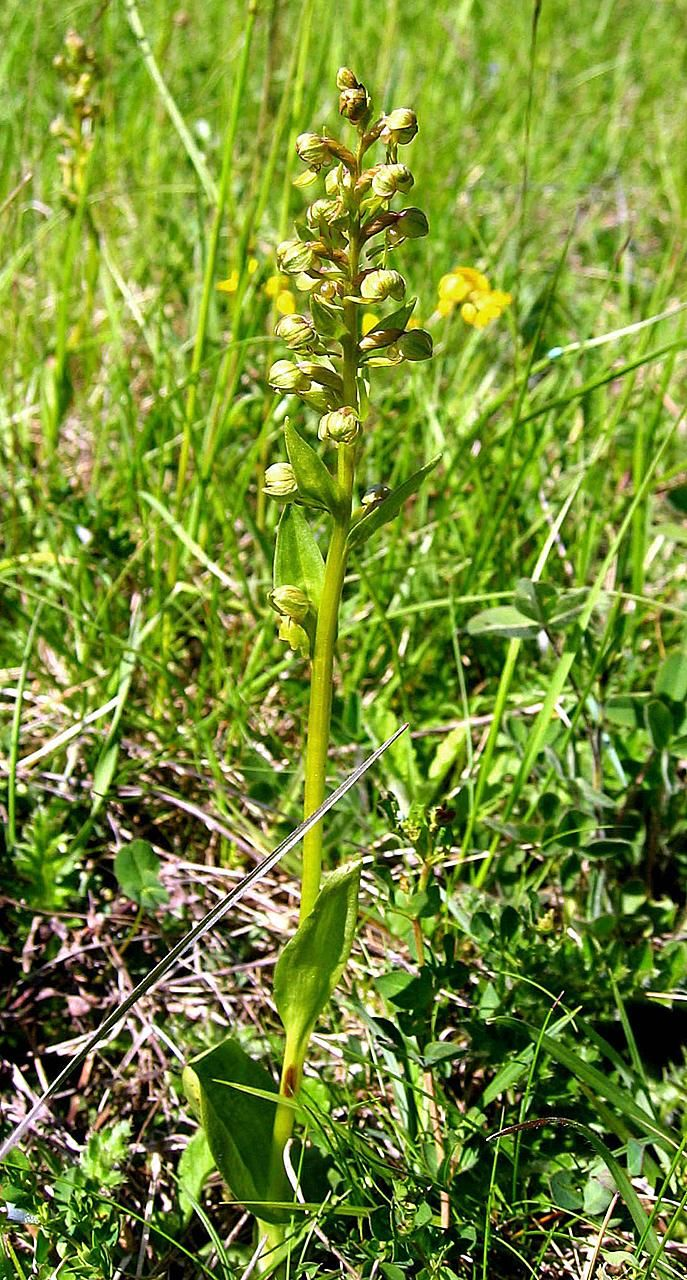
Dactylorhiza viridis Habitus

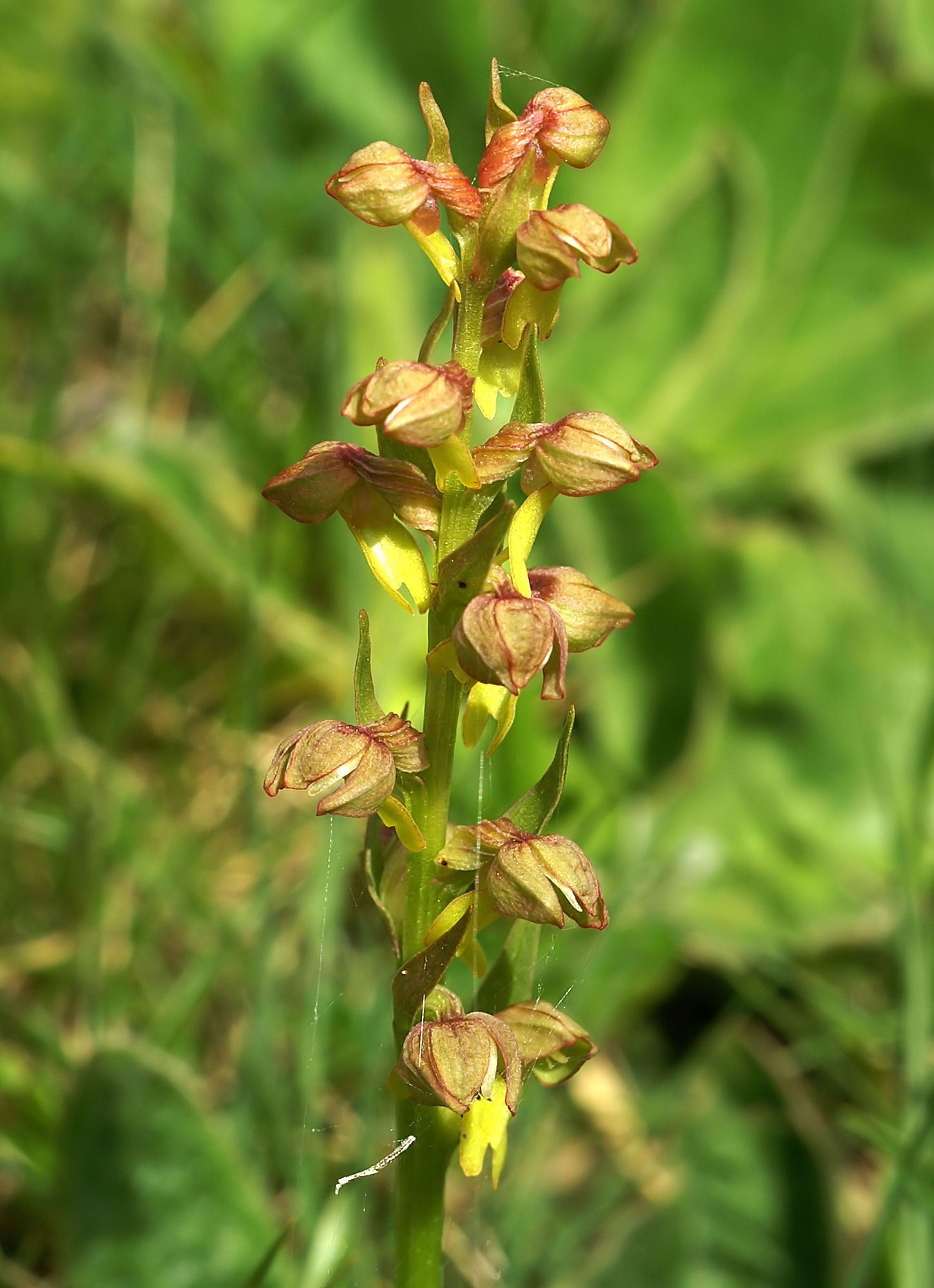
Dactylorhiza viridis
- EOL images of Dactylorhiza viridis

nothosubspecies of = Dactylorhiza (hybrid subspecies)

- x braunii (Halácsy) Borsos & Soó
- x claudiopolitana (Soó) Soó
- x formosa (T. & T.A. Stephenson) Soó
- x jenensis (Brand.) Soó
- x kellerana P.F. Hunt
- x kernerorum (Soó) Soó
- x townsendiana (Rouy) Soó
- x transiens (Druce) Soó
- x venusta (T. & T.A. Stephenson) Soó
- Dactylorhiza fuchsii x incarnata subsp. cruenta

== Genus Epipactis Zinn ==
- Epipactis atrorubens (Hoffm.) Besser.

Distribution. Western Ireland. Map

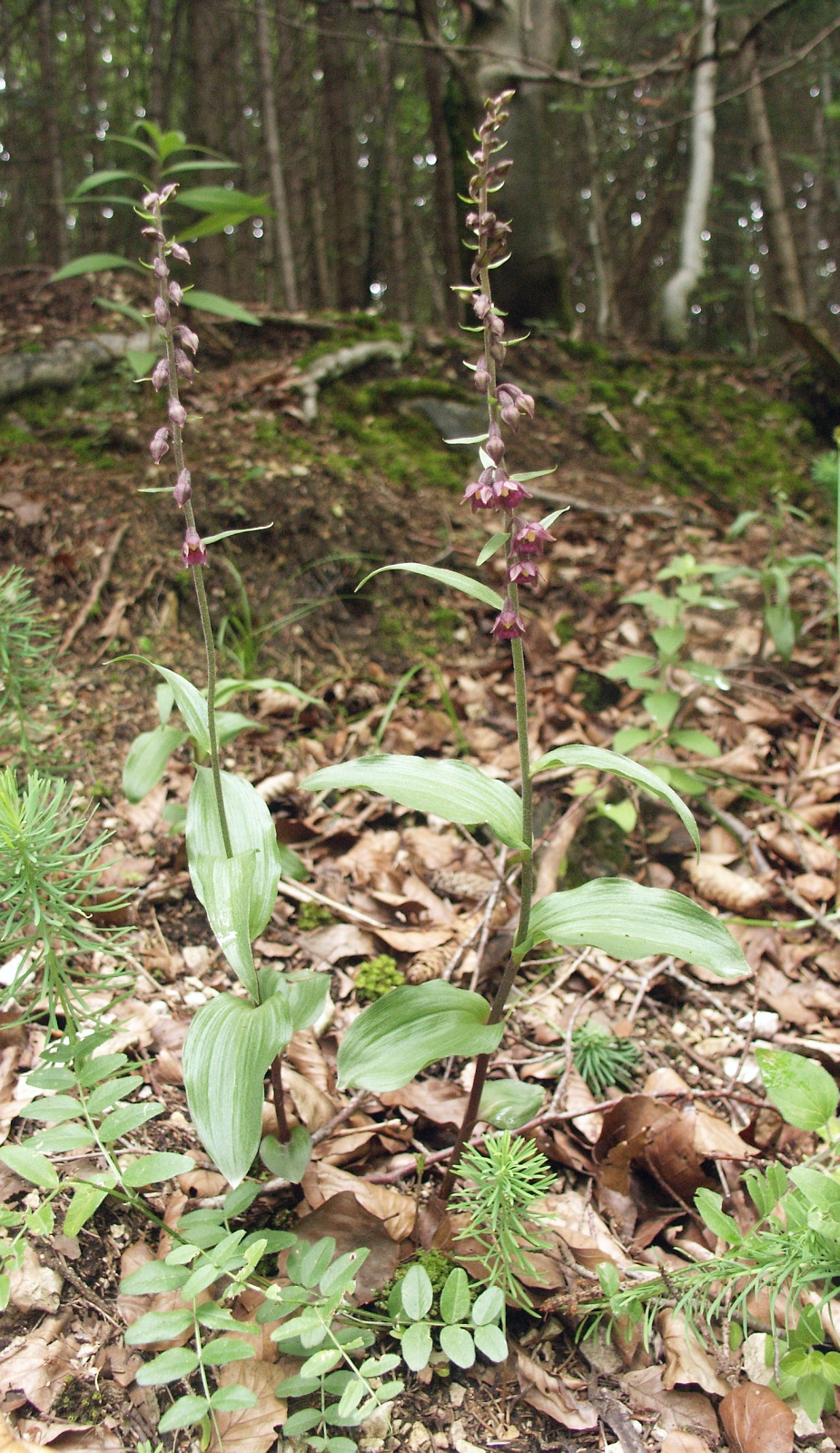
Epipactis atrorubens. Habitus

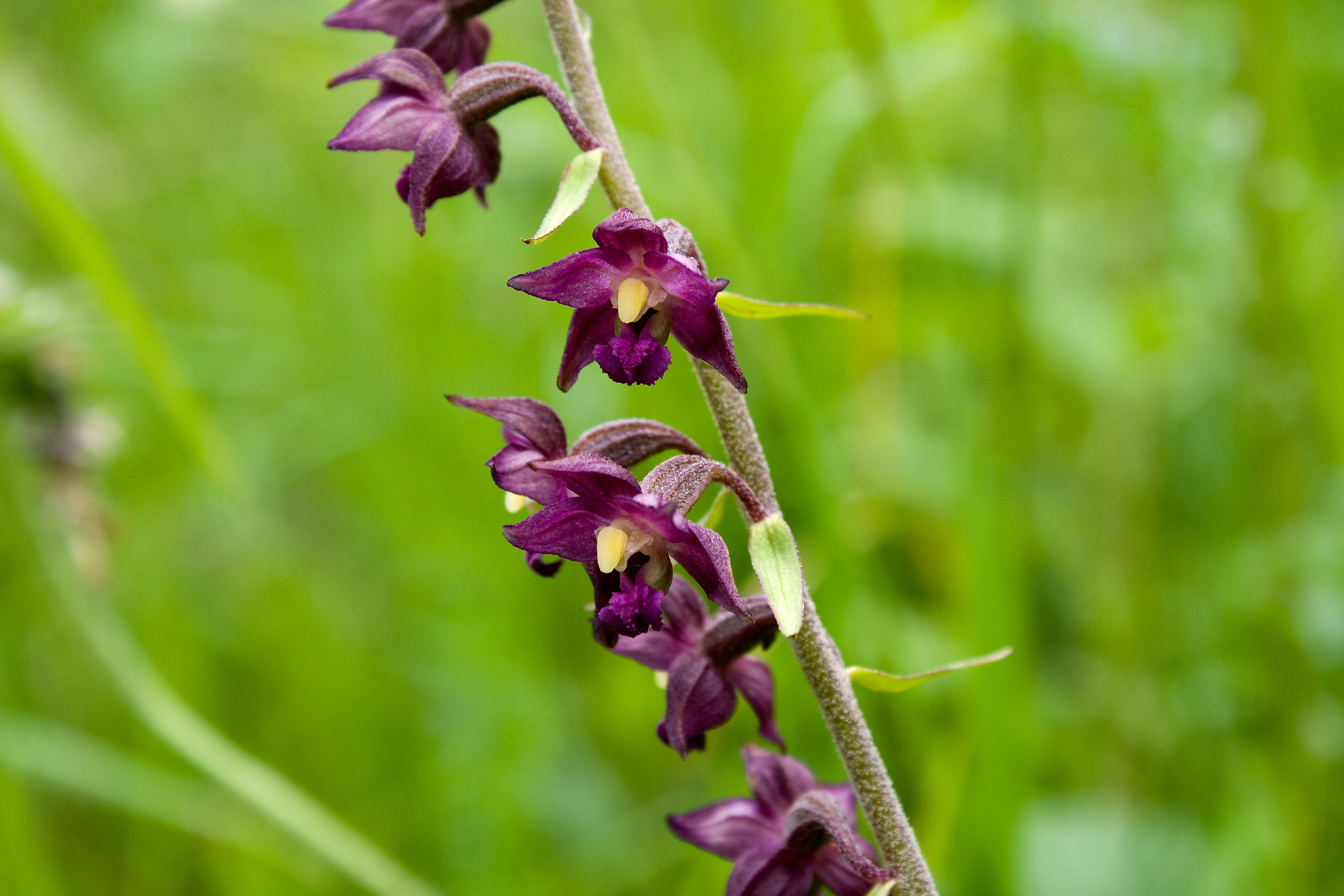
Epipactis atrorubens. Inflorescence
- EOL images of Epipactis atrorubens
- Epipactis helleborine (Linnaeus) Crantz.

Distribution. All Ireland. Map

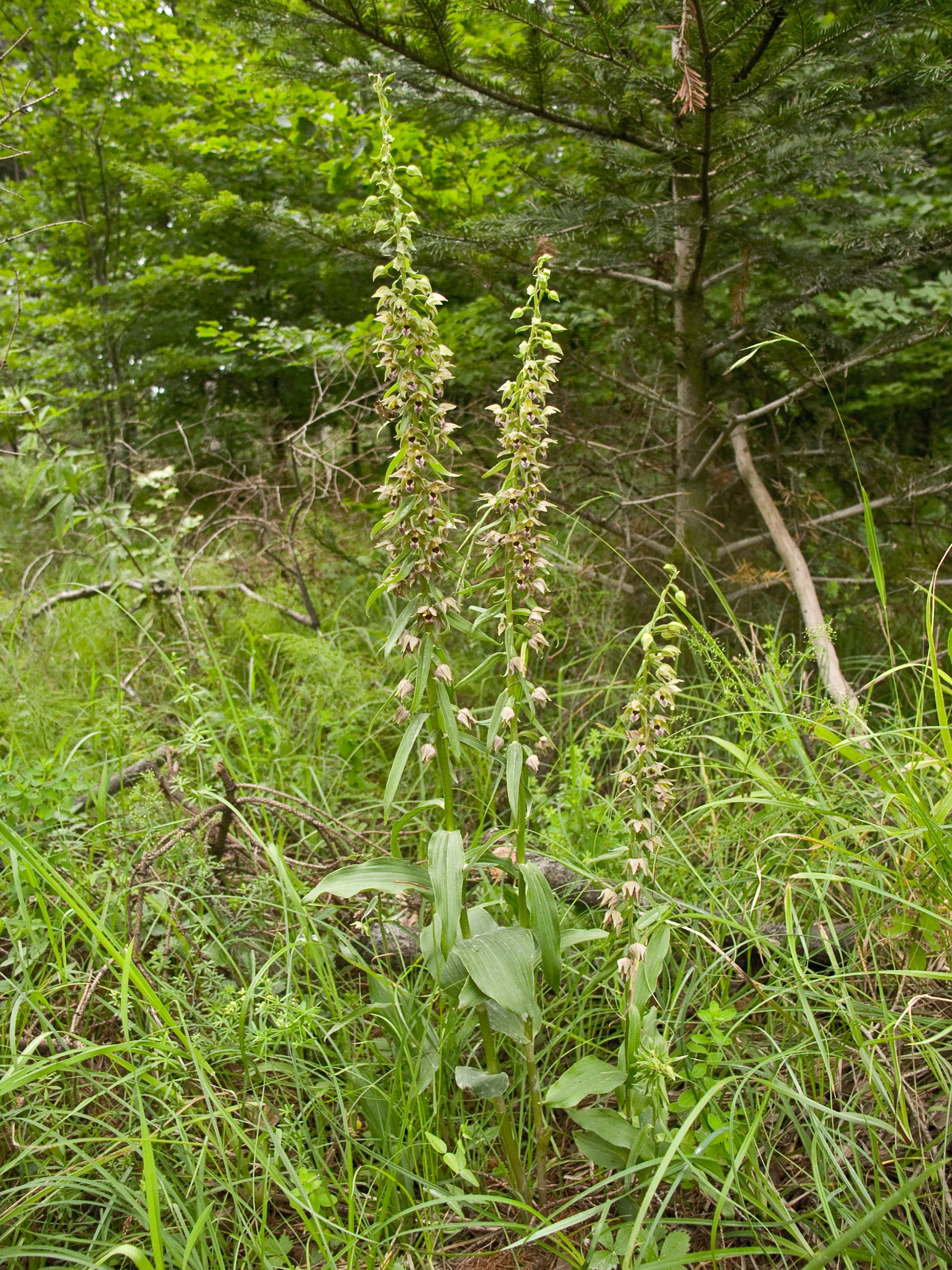
Epipactis helleborine Habitus

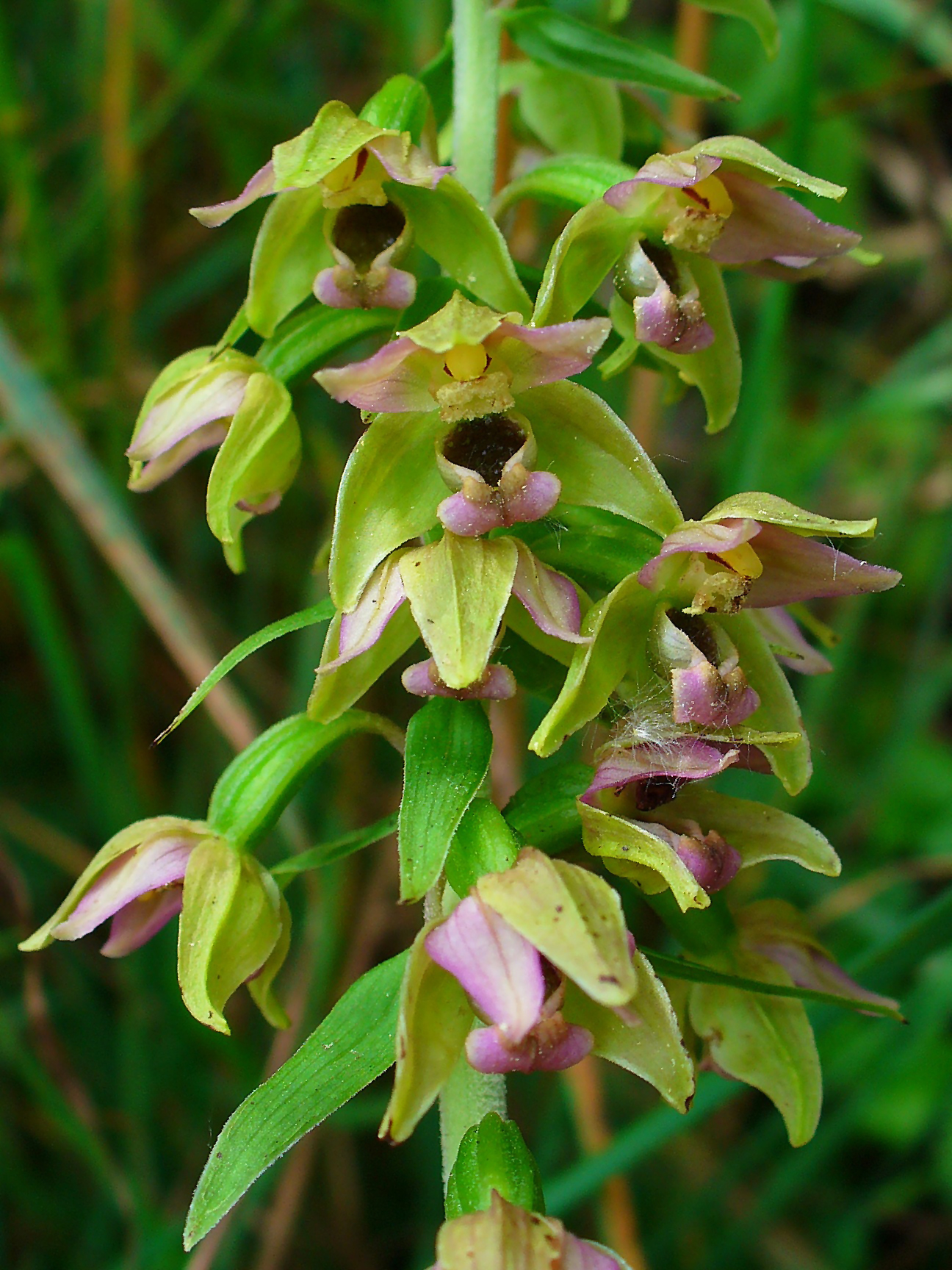
Epipactis helleborine Inflorescence
- EOL images of Epipactis helleborine
- Epipactis palustris (Linnaeus) Crantz.

Distribution. All Ireland. Map

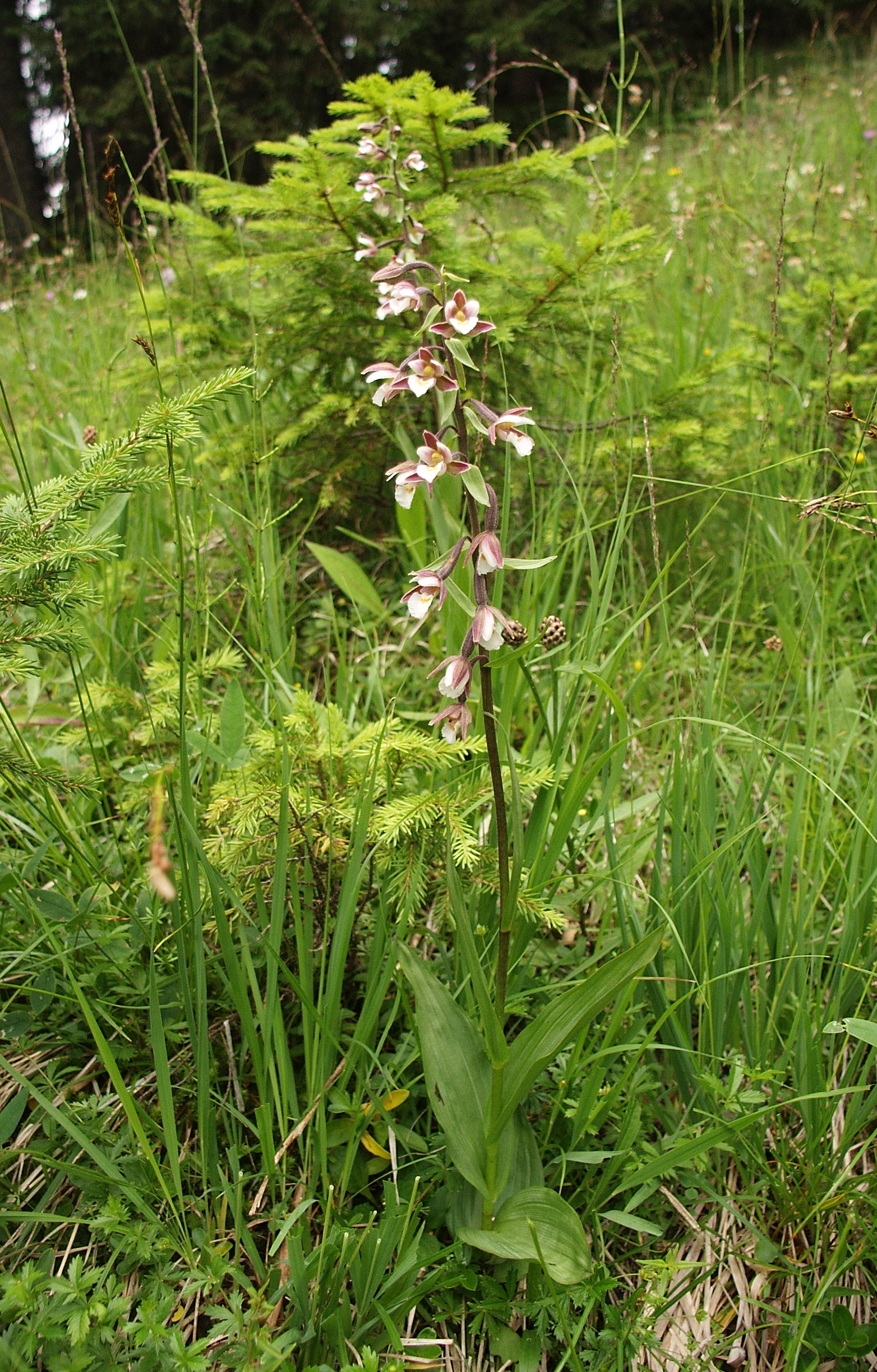
Habitat

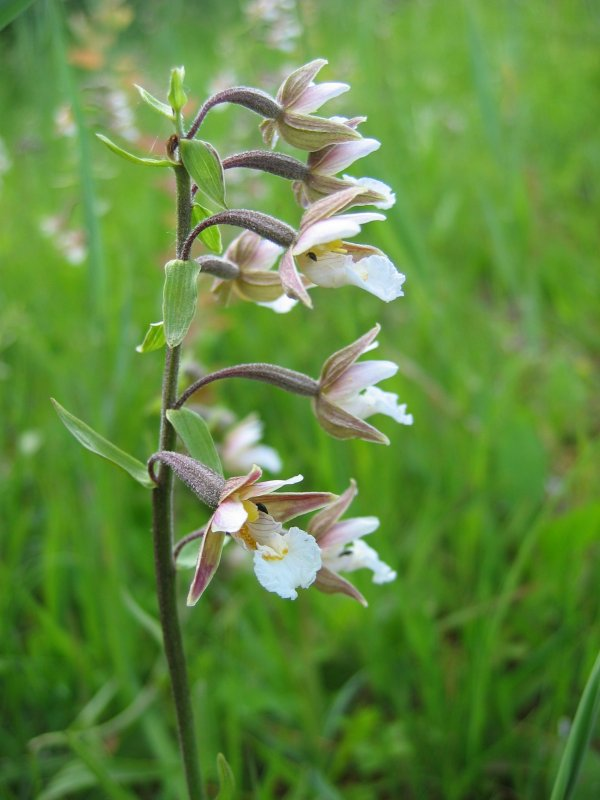
Inflorescence

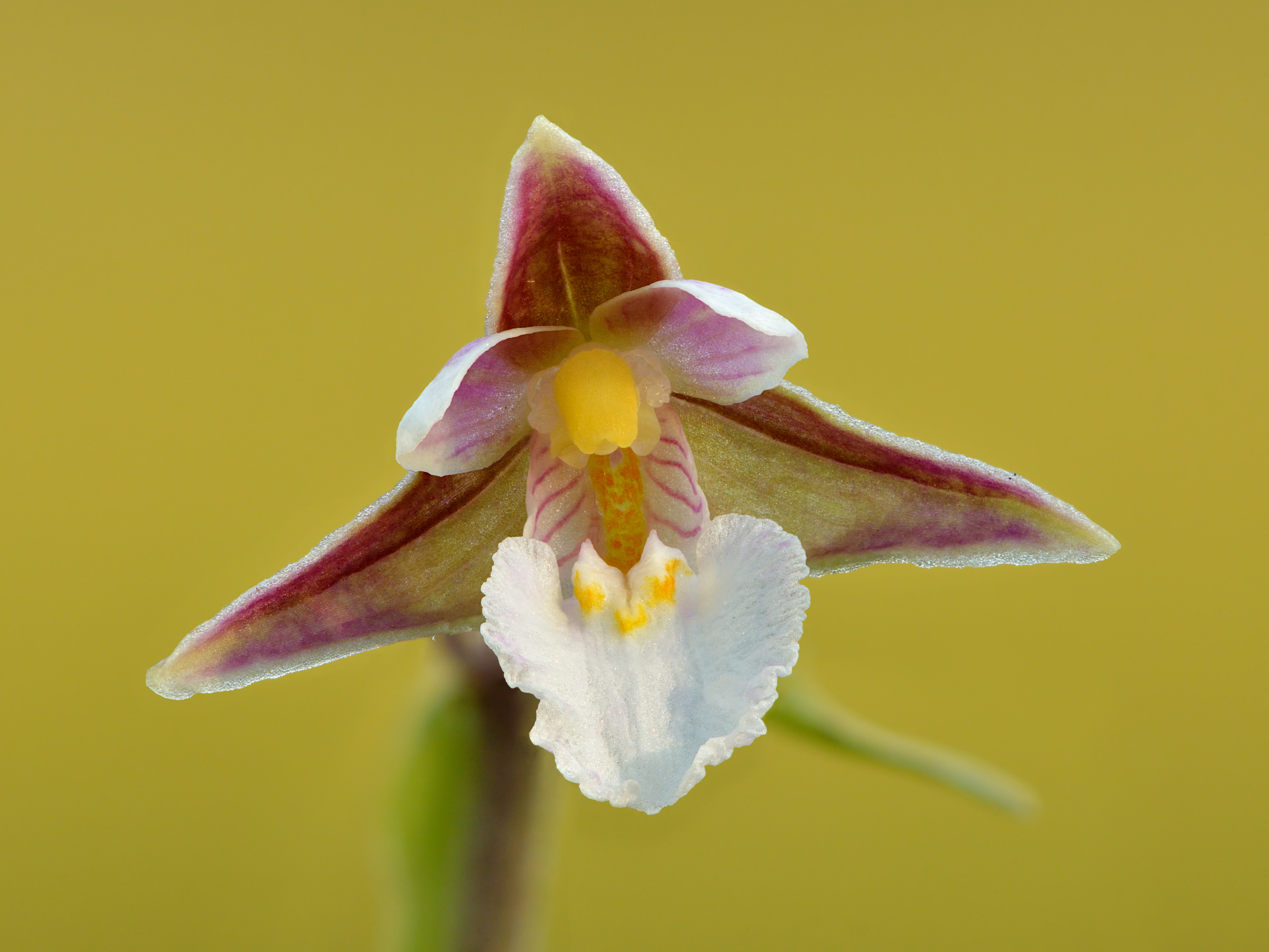
Flower
- EOL images of Epipactis palustris
- Epipactis phyllanthes G.E. Smith.

Distribution.Confined to North and coastal East Map

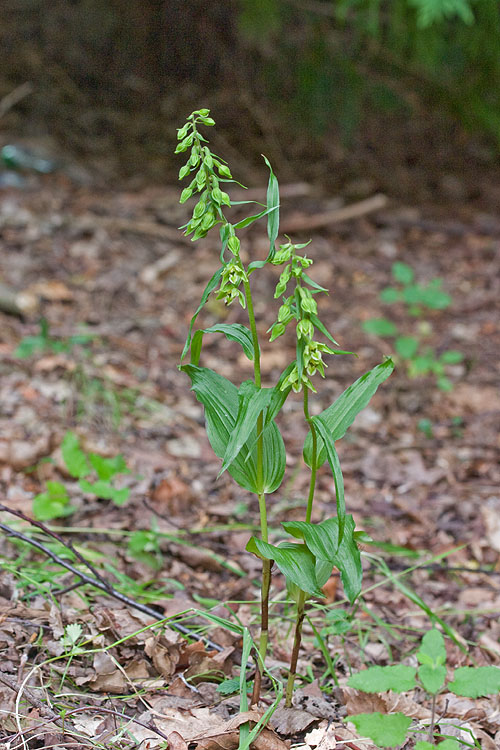
Epipactis phyllanthes
- EOL images of Epipactis phyllanthes

== Genus Gymnadenia R. Brown ==
- Gymnadenia borealis (Druce) R.M.Bateman, Pridgeon & M.W.Chase.

Distribution. Restricted. Map

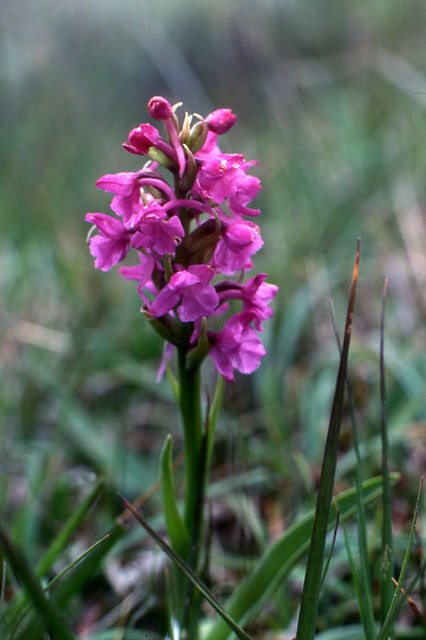
Gymnadenia borealis Keen of Hamar NNR Scotland
- Gymnadenia conopsea (Linnaeus) R. Brown.

Distribution.All Ireland Map

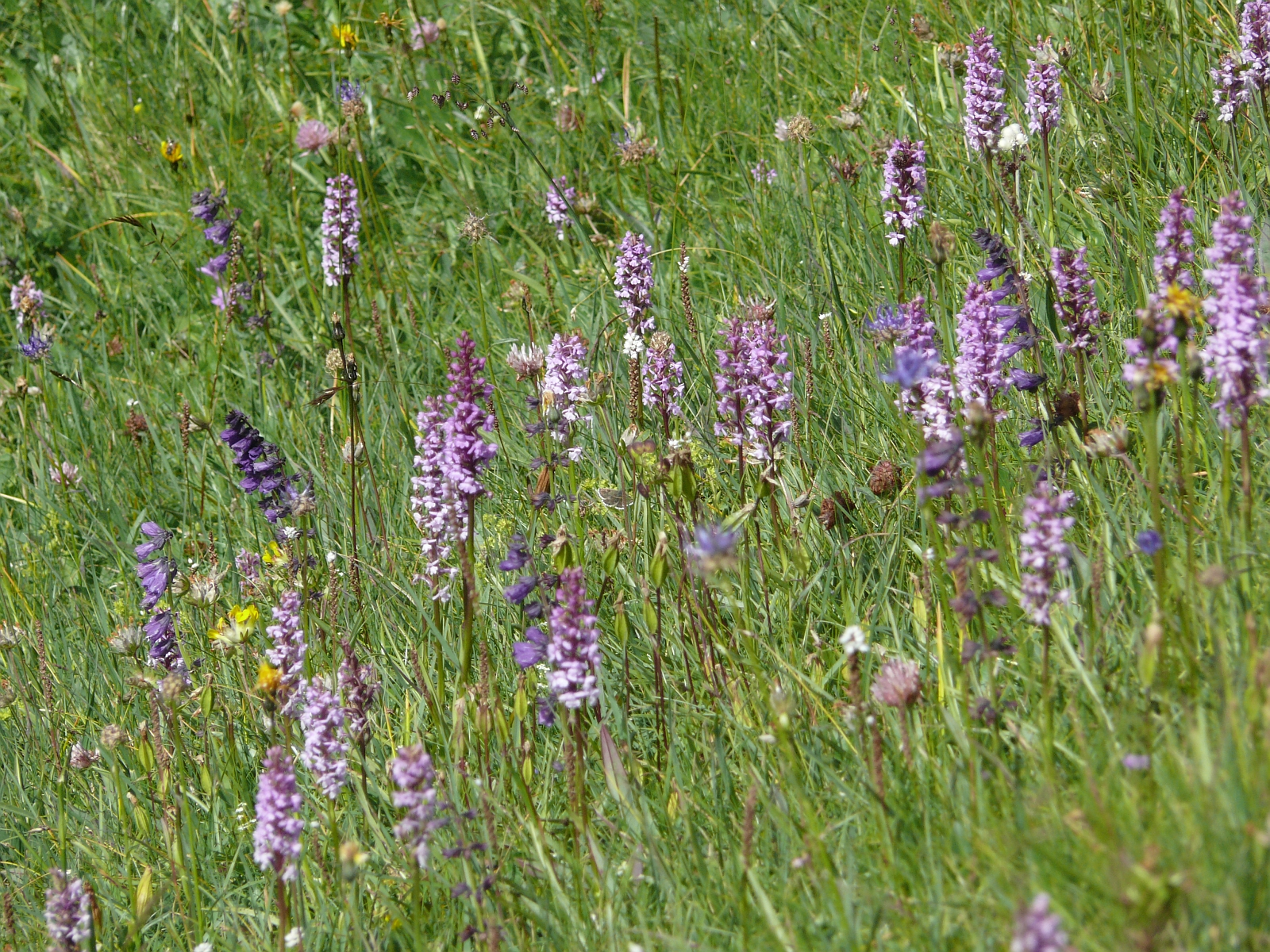
Gymnadenia conopsea. Habitat

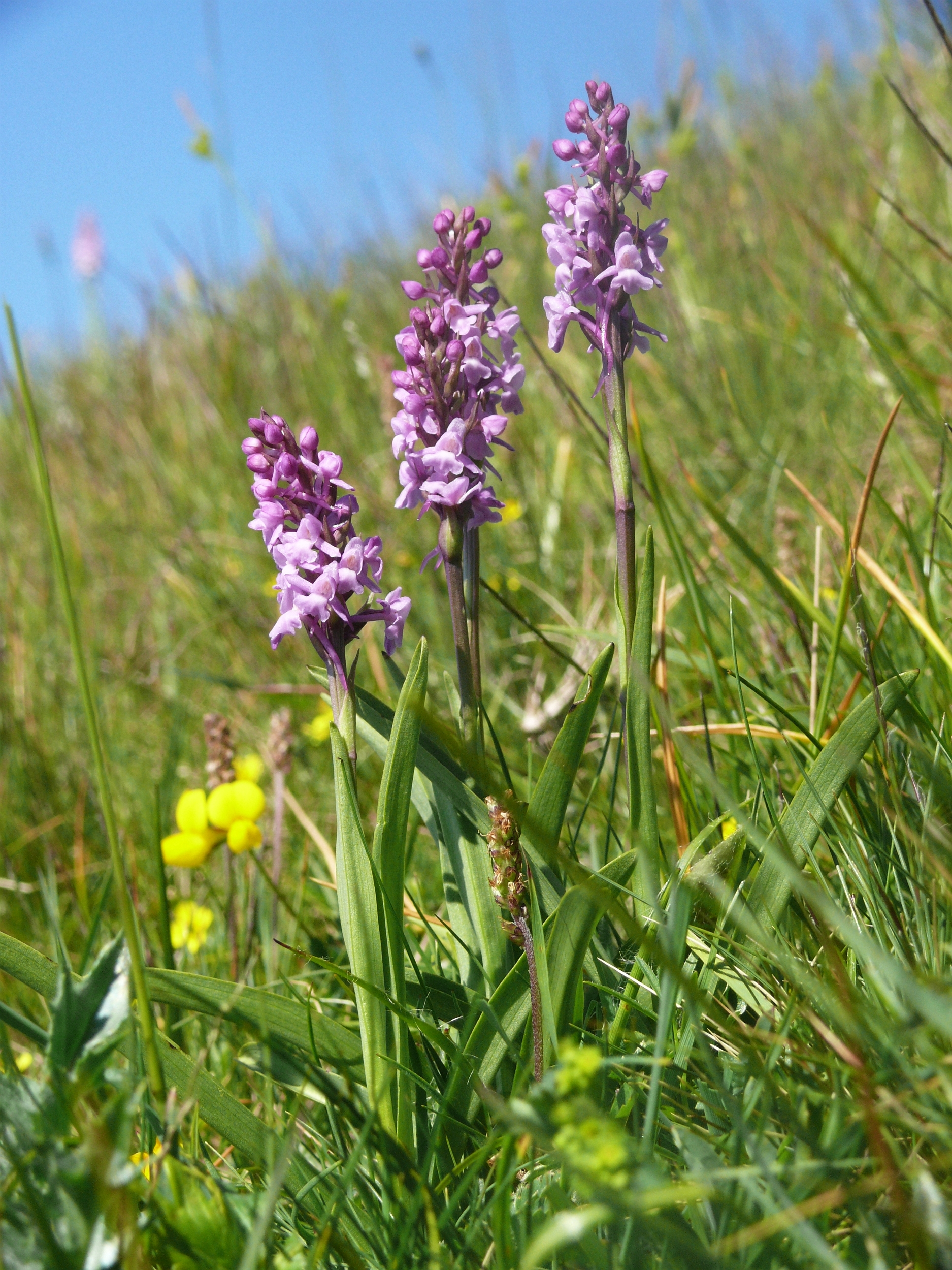
Gymnadenia conopsea Habitus
- EOL images of Gymnadenia conopsea
- Gymnadenia densiflora (Wahlenb.) A. Dietr. = Gymnadenia × densiflora (Wahlenb.) A.Dietr., Allg. Gartenzeitung 7: 170 (1839) only this hybrid name is accepted. Hybrid Formula: G. conopsea × G. odoratissima

Distribution. Restricted. North map

nothosubspecies of Gymnadenia (hybrid subspecies)

- x Dactylogymnadenia cookei (H. Harrison fil.) Soó
- x Dactylogymnadenia legrandiana (Camus) Soó
- x Dactylogymnadenia varia (T. & T.A. Stephenson) Soó

== Genus Hammarbya O. Kuntze ==
- Hammarbya paludosa (Linnaeus) Kuntze.

Distribution.All Ireland.Coastal Map Status.Endangered.

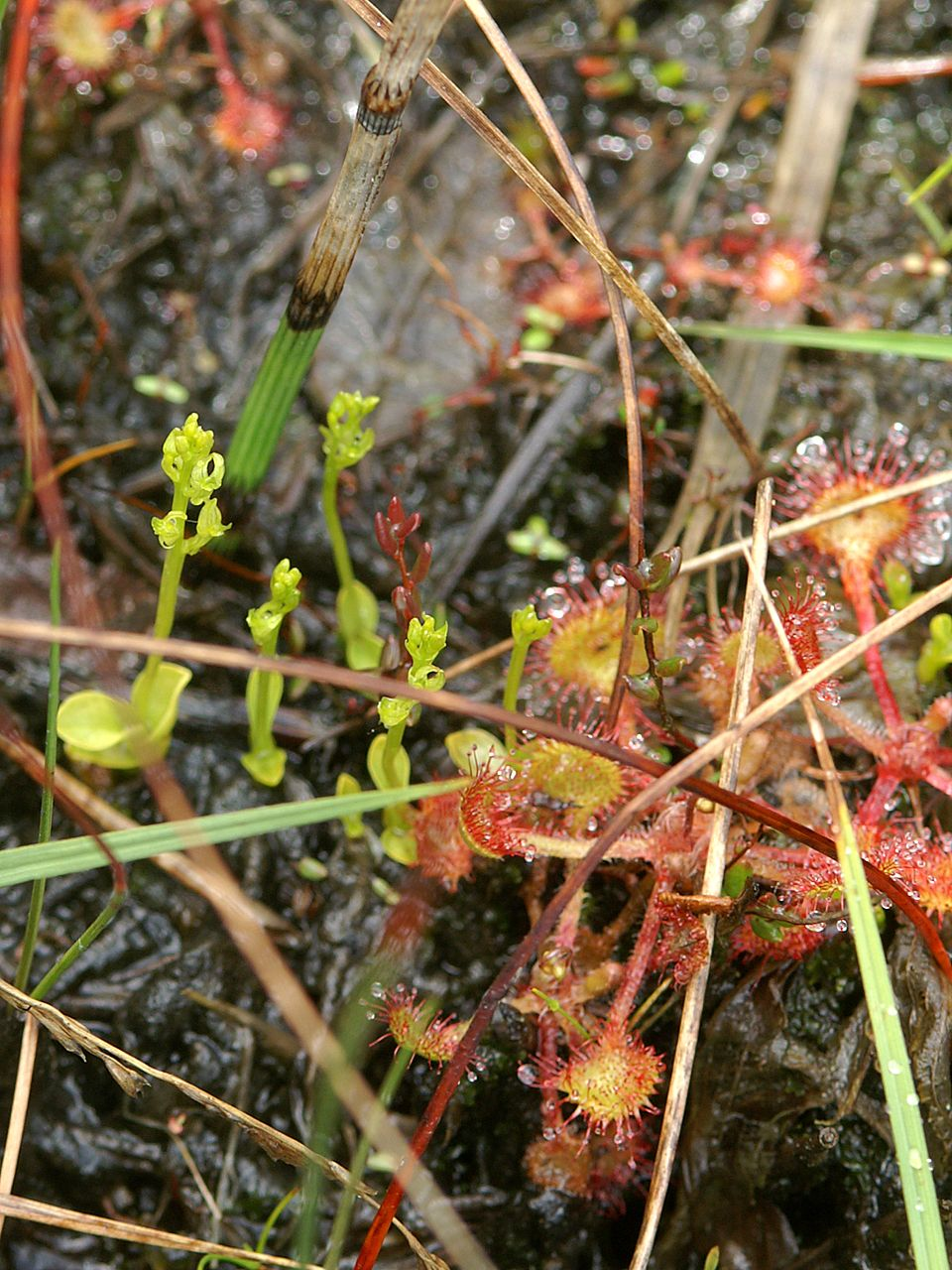
Hammarbya paludosa. Habitus

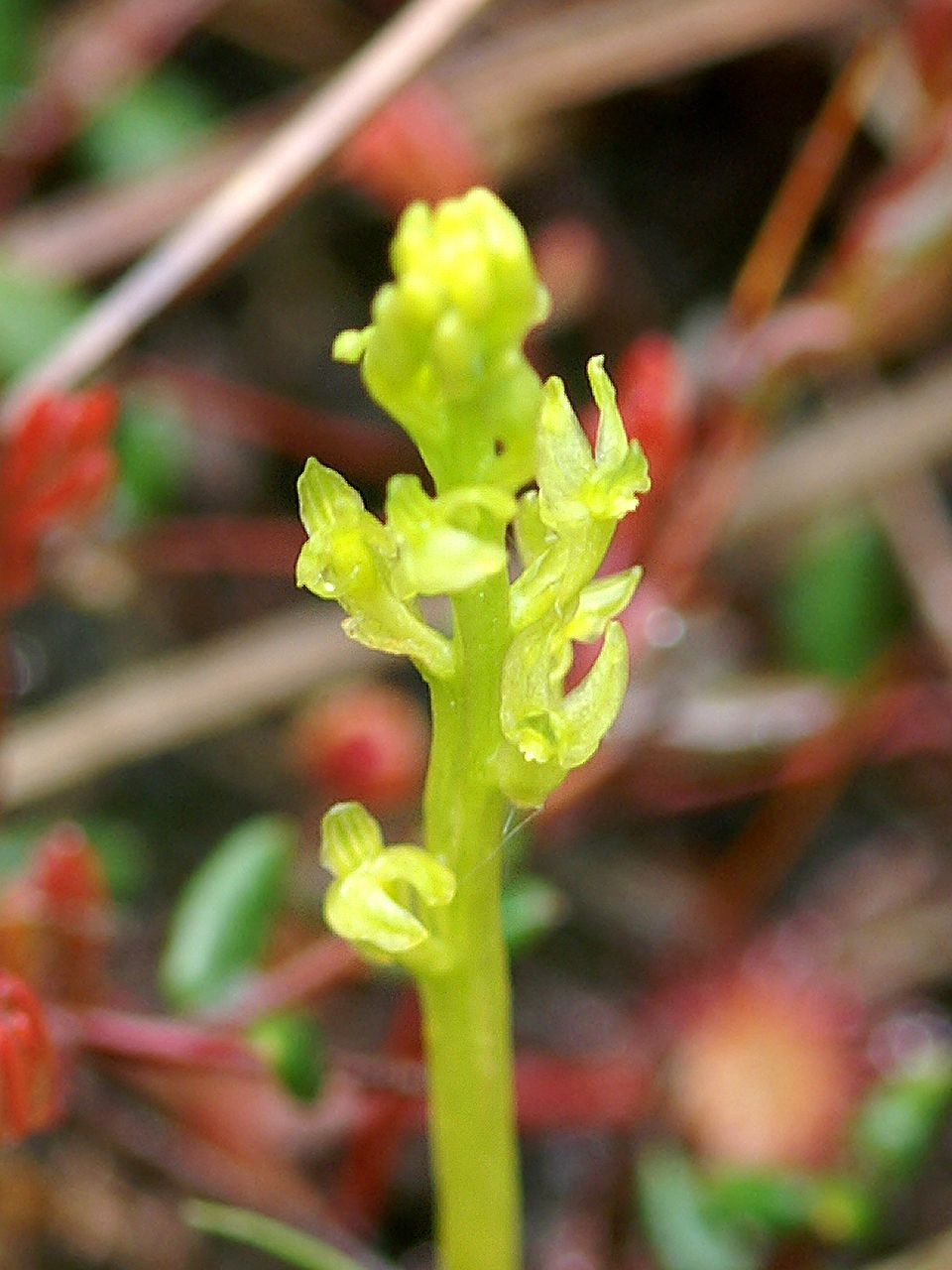
Hammarbya paludosa Infloresecence

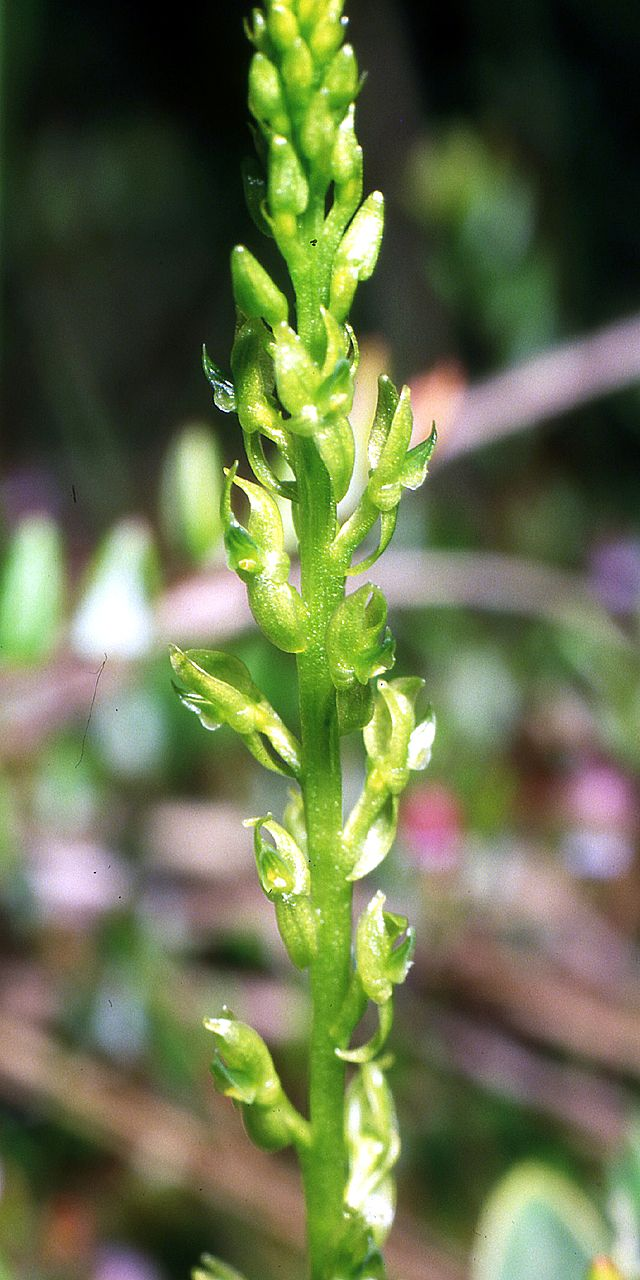
Hammarbya paludosa Infloresecence
- EOL images of Hammarbya paludosa

== Genus Leucorchis E. Mey ==
valid combination Pseudorchis albida (Linnaeus) A. Löve & D. Löve. See below

== Genus Listera R. Brown ==
Valid combination Neottia cordata (L.) Rich. Valid combination Neottia ovata (Linnaeus) Bluff & Fingerh.

== Genus Neotinea Reichb. f. ==
- Neotinea maculata (Desfontaines) W.L. Stearn

Distribution. WesternIreland (24 Hectads) Map

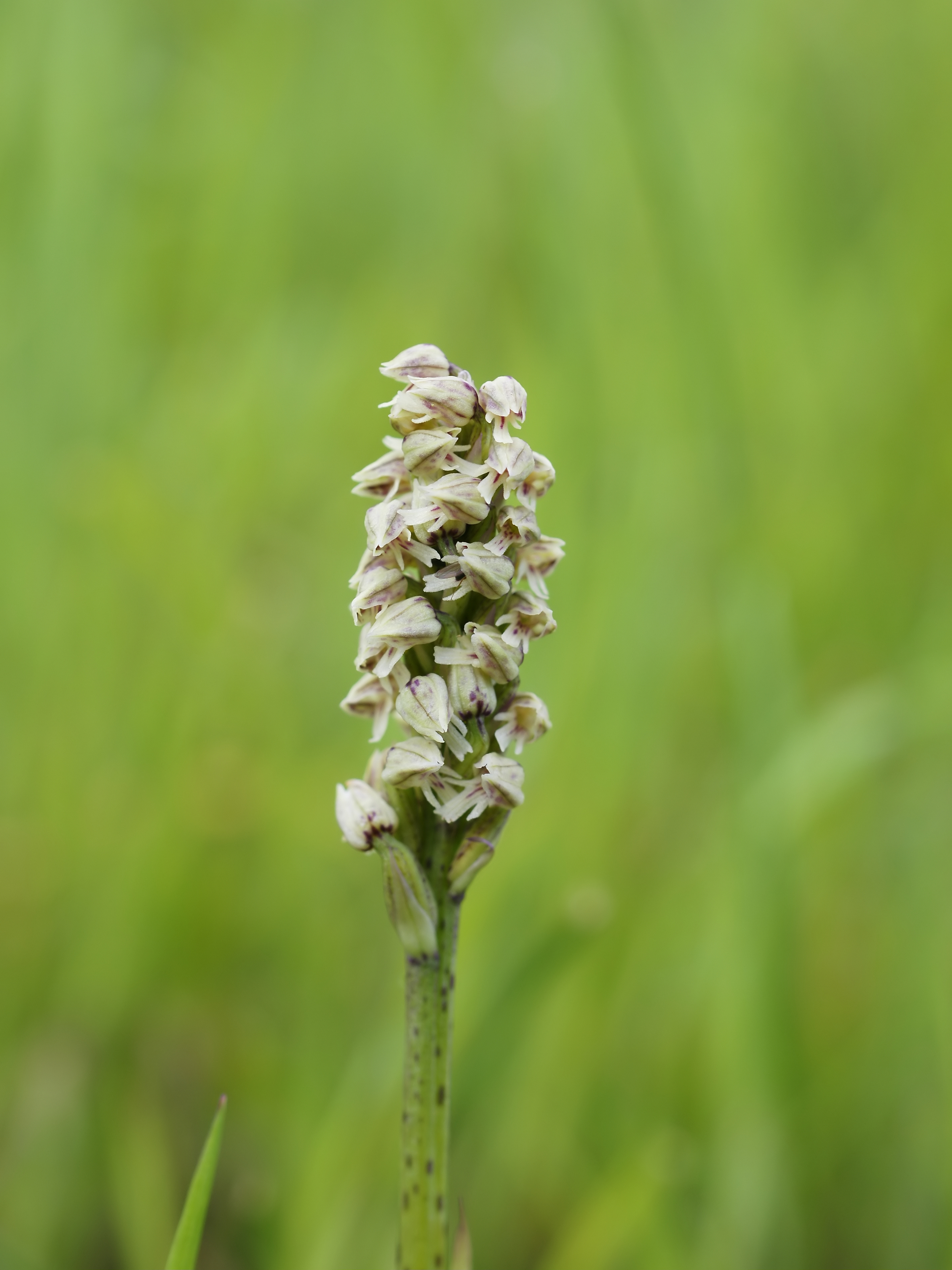
Neotinea maculata
- EOL images of Neotinea maculata

== Genus Neottia Ludwig ==
- Neottia cordata (L.) Rich.

Distribution. All Ireland. Fewer records Midland Map

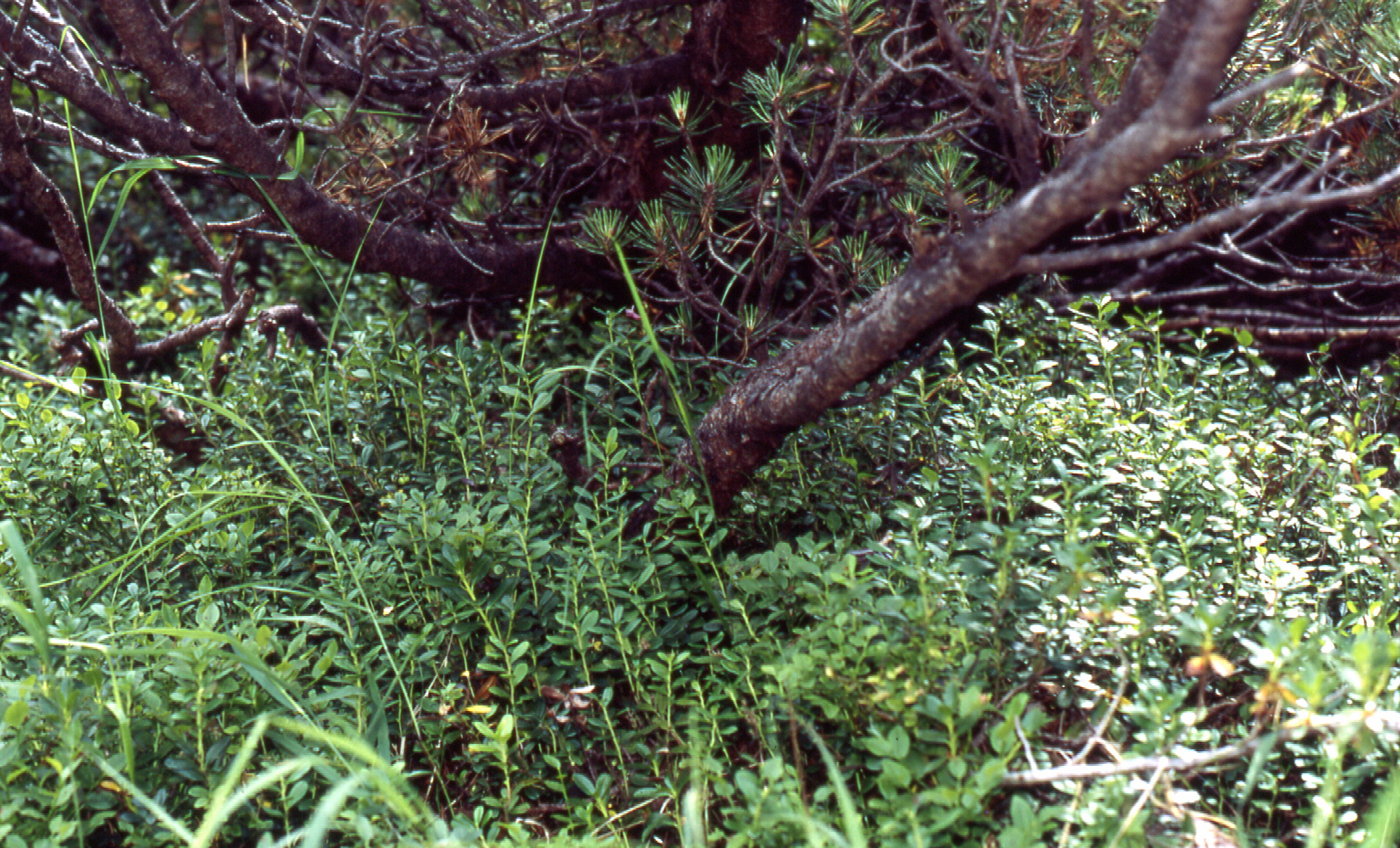
Listera cordata Habitat (Alpine Biotope)

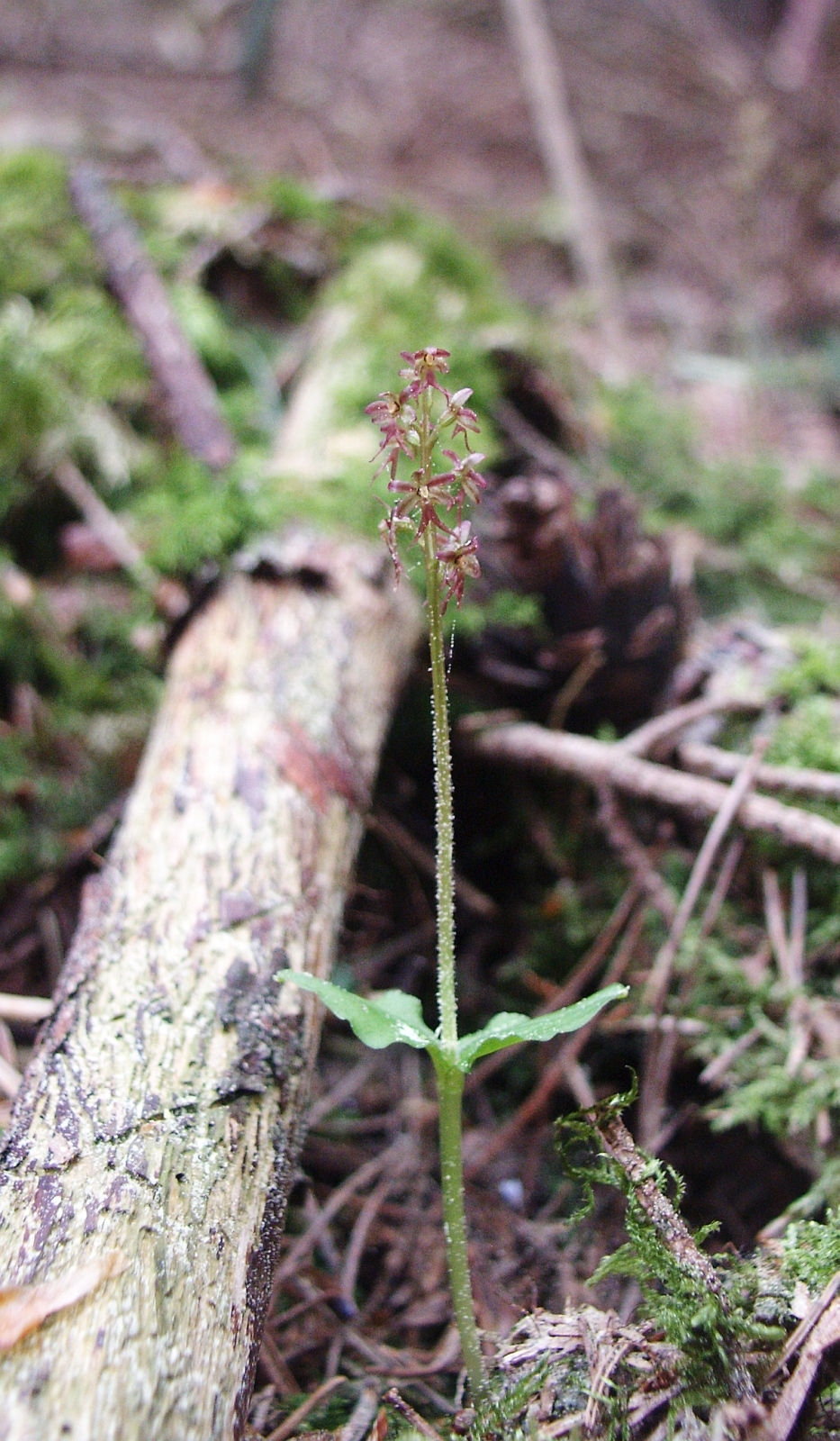
Listera cordata Habitus

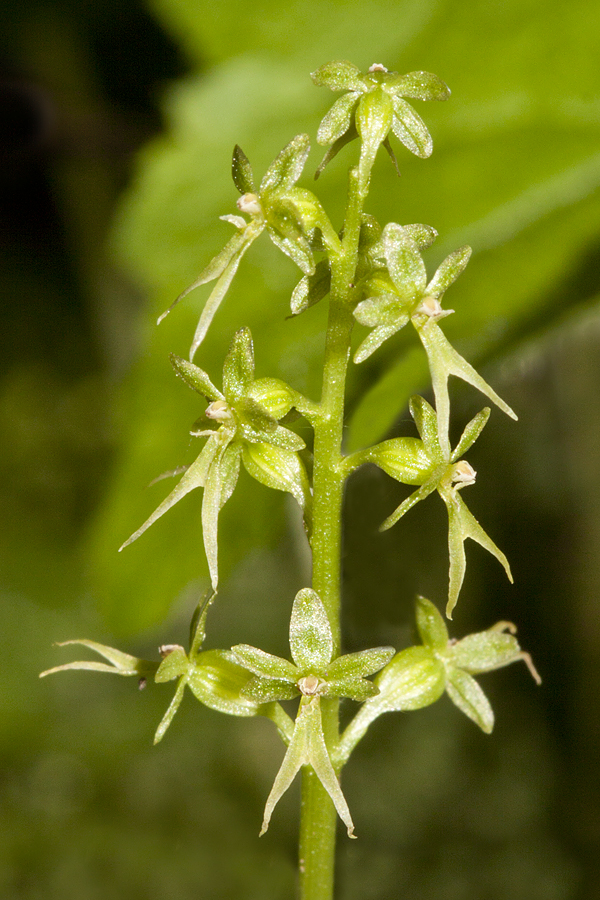
Listera cordata Inflorescence
- EOL images of Neottia cordata
- Neottia ovata (Linnaeus) Bluff & Fingerh.

Distribution. All Ireland.Map

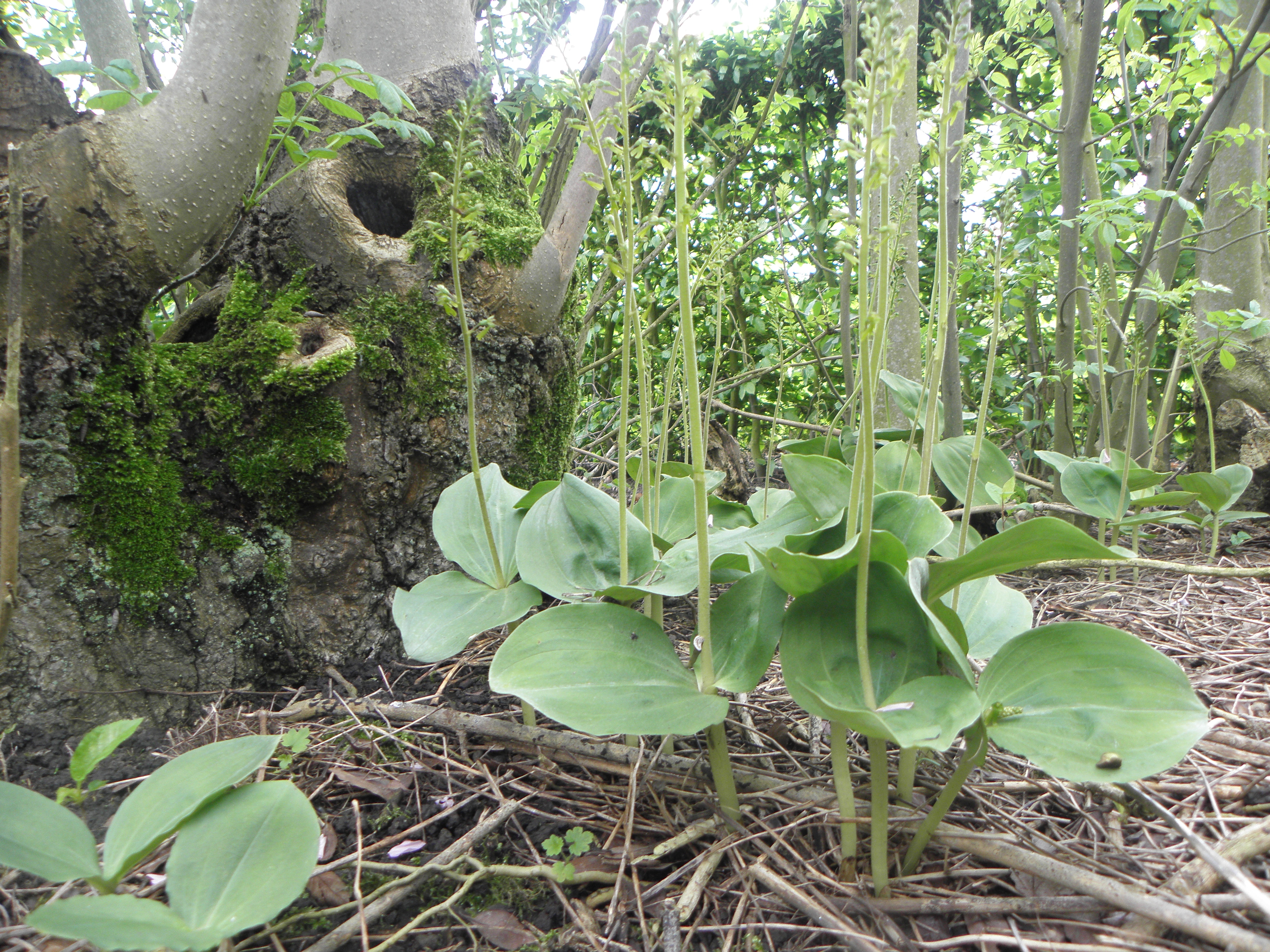
Neottia ovata Habitus

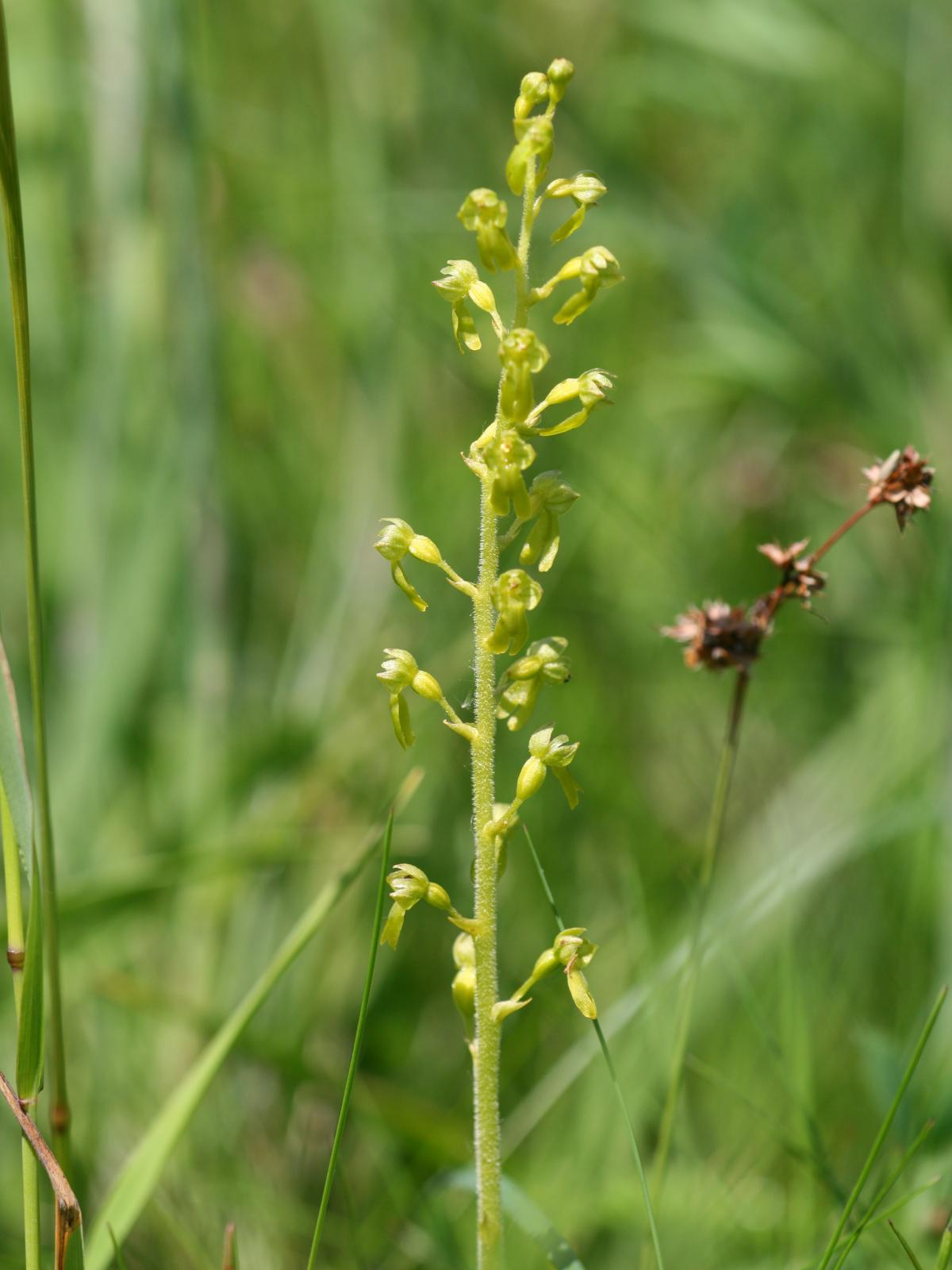
Neottia ovata Inflorescence
- EOL images of Neottia ovata
- Neottia nidus-avis (Linnaeus) L.C.M.Richard

Distribution.All Ireland. Map

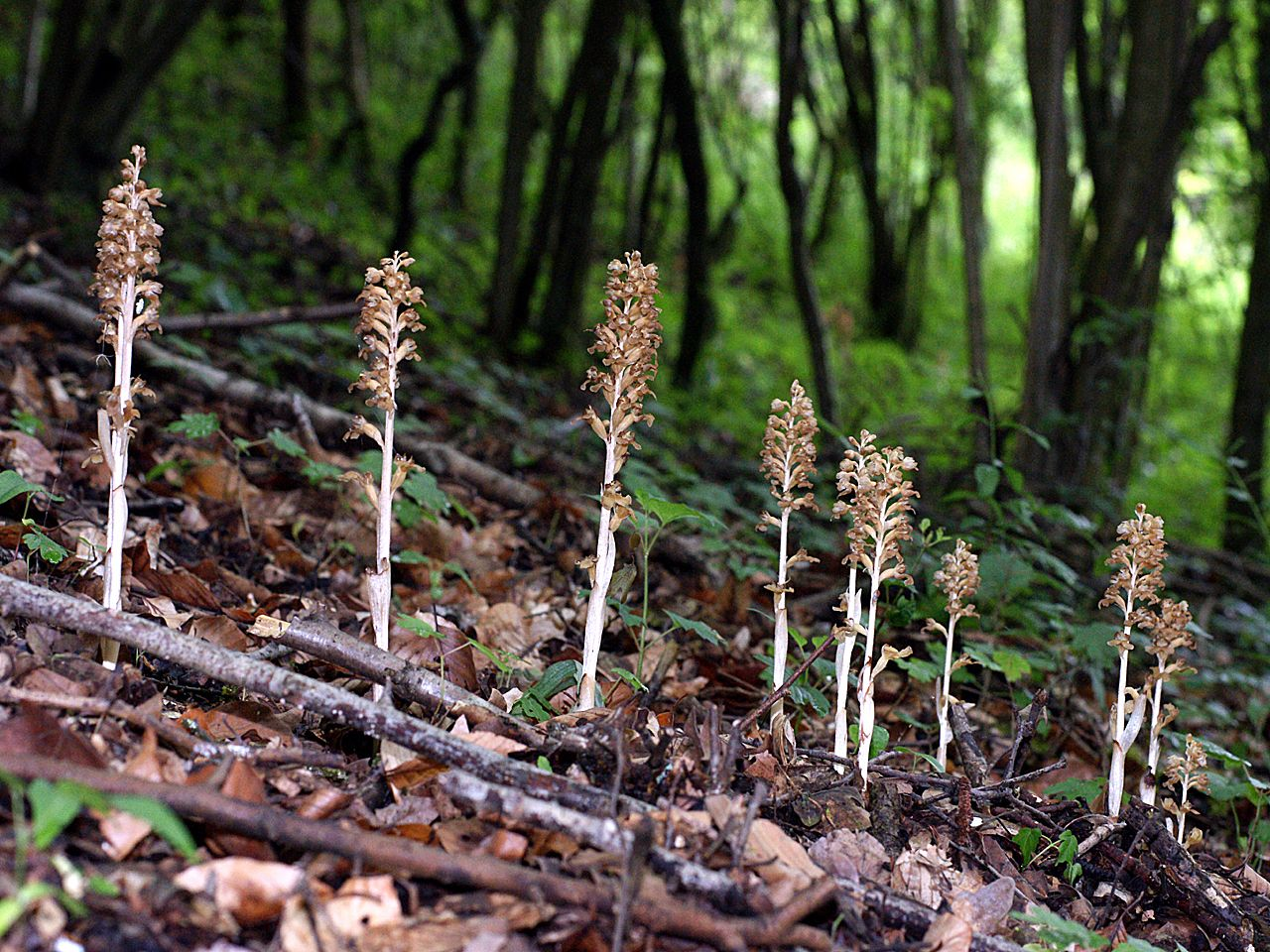
Neottia nidus-avis Habitus

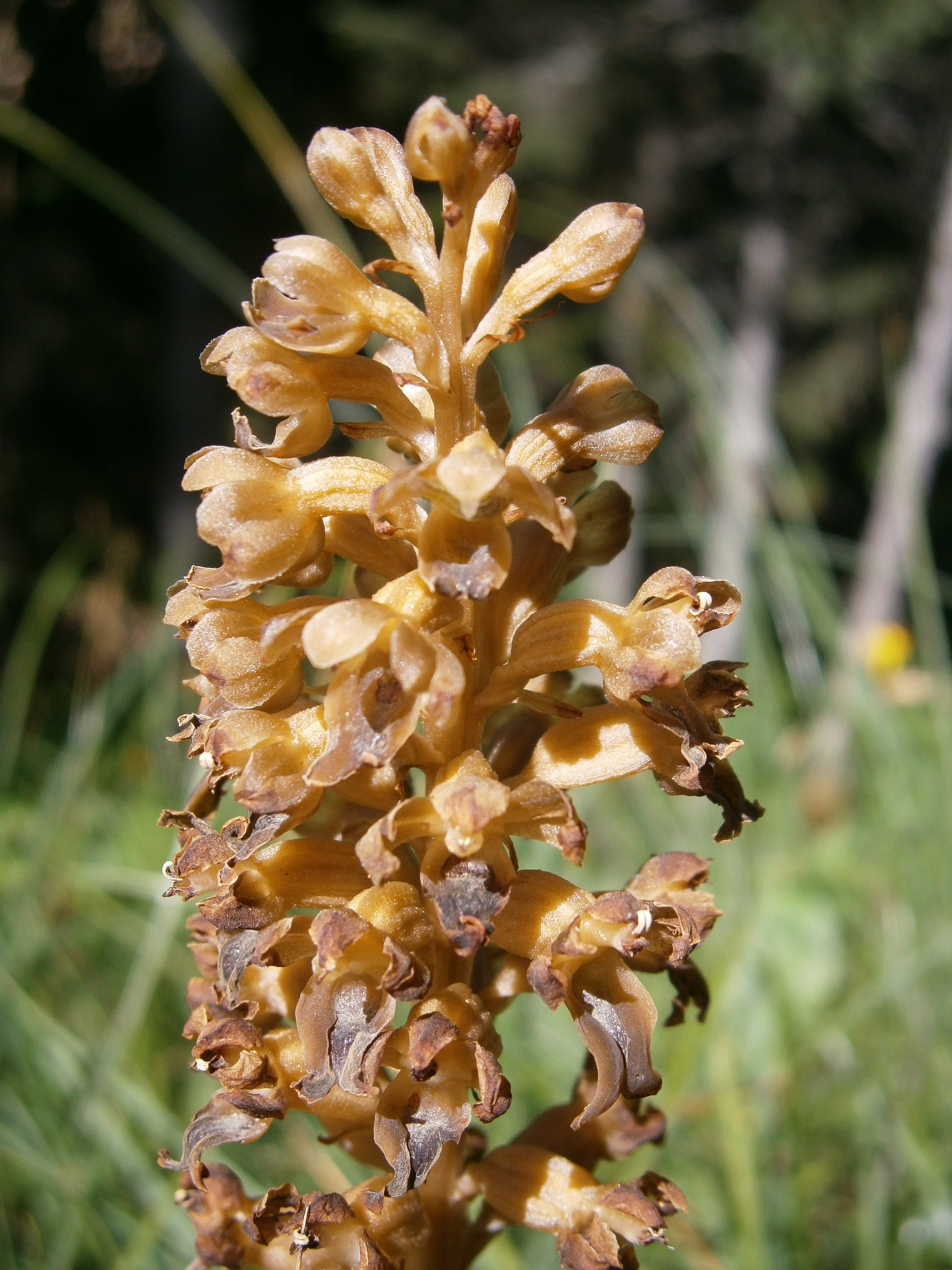
Neottia nidus-avis Inflorescence
- EOL images of Neottia nidus-avis

== Genus Ophrys Linnaeus ==
- Ophrys apifera Hudson

Distribution.All Ireland. Map

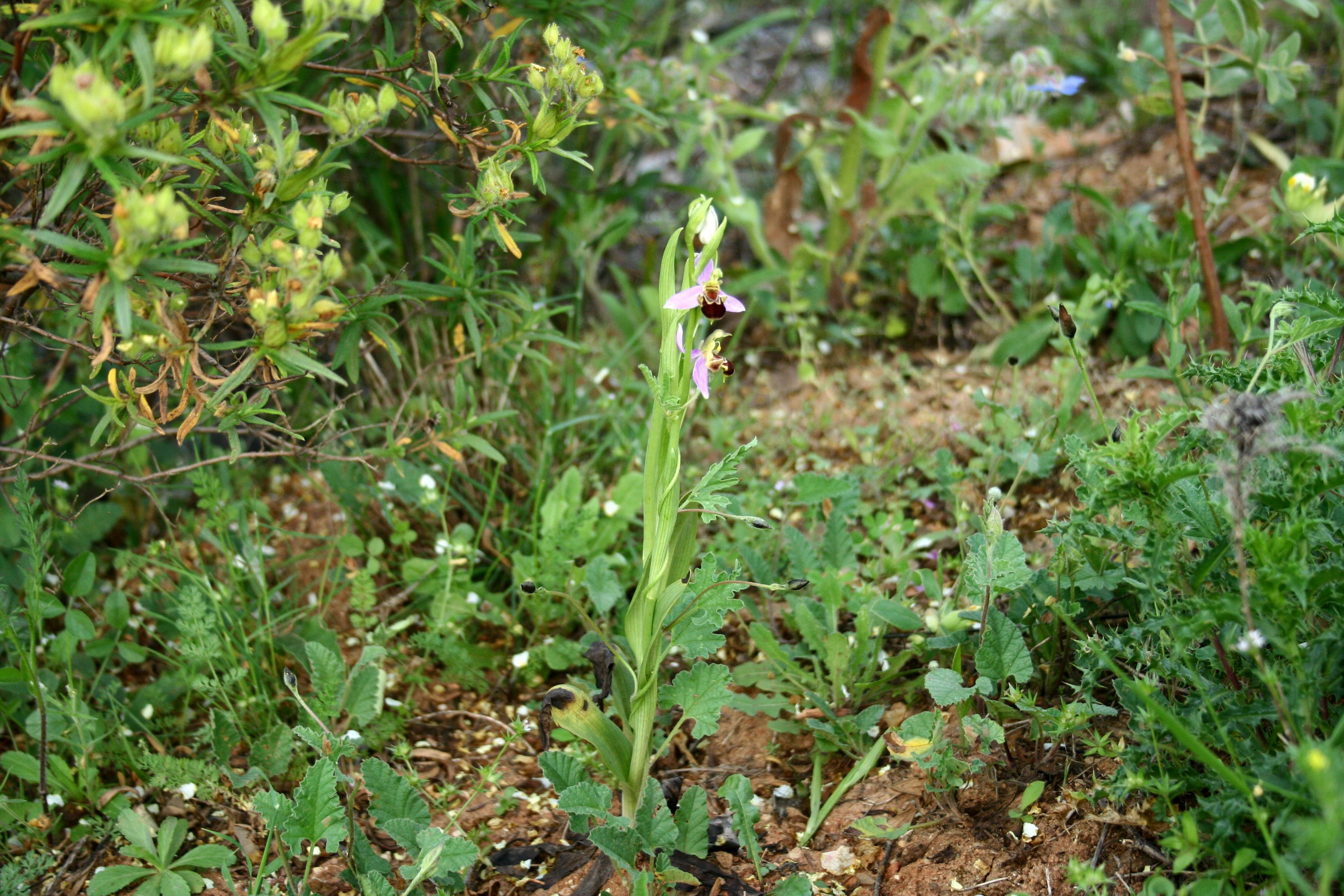
Ophrys apifera Habitus

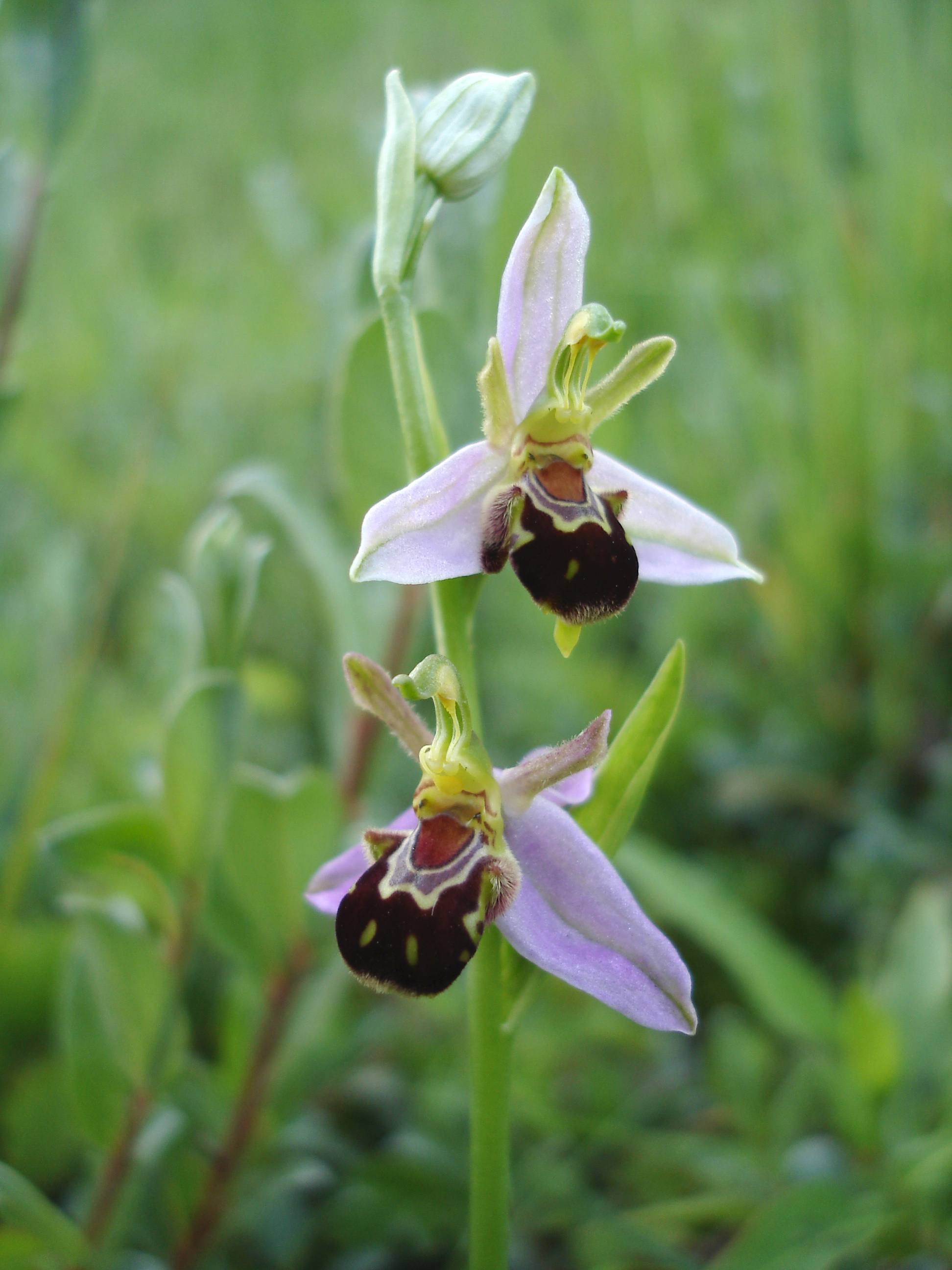
Ophrys apifera Inflorescence
- EOL images of Ophrys apifera
- Ophrys insectifera Linnaeus

Distribution.Central and West Ireland (karst). Map

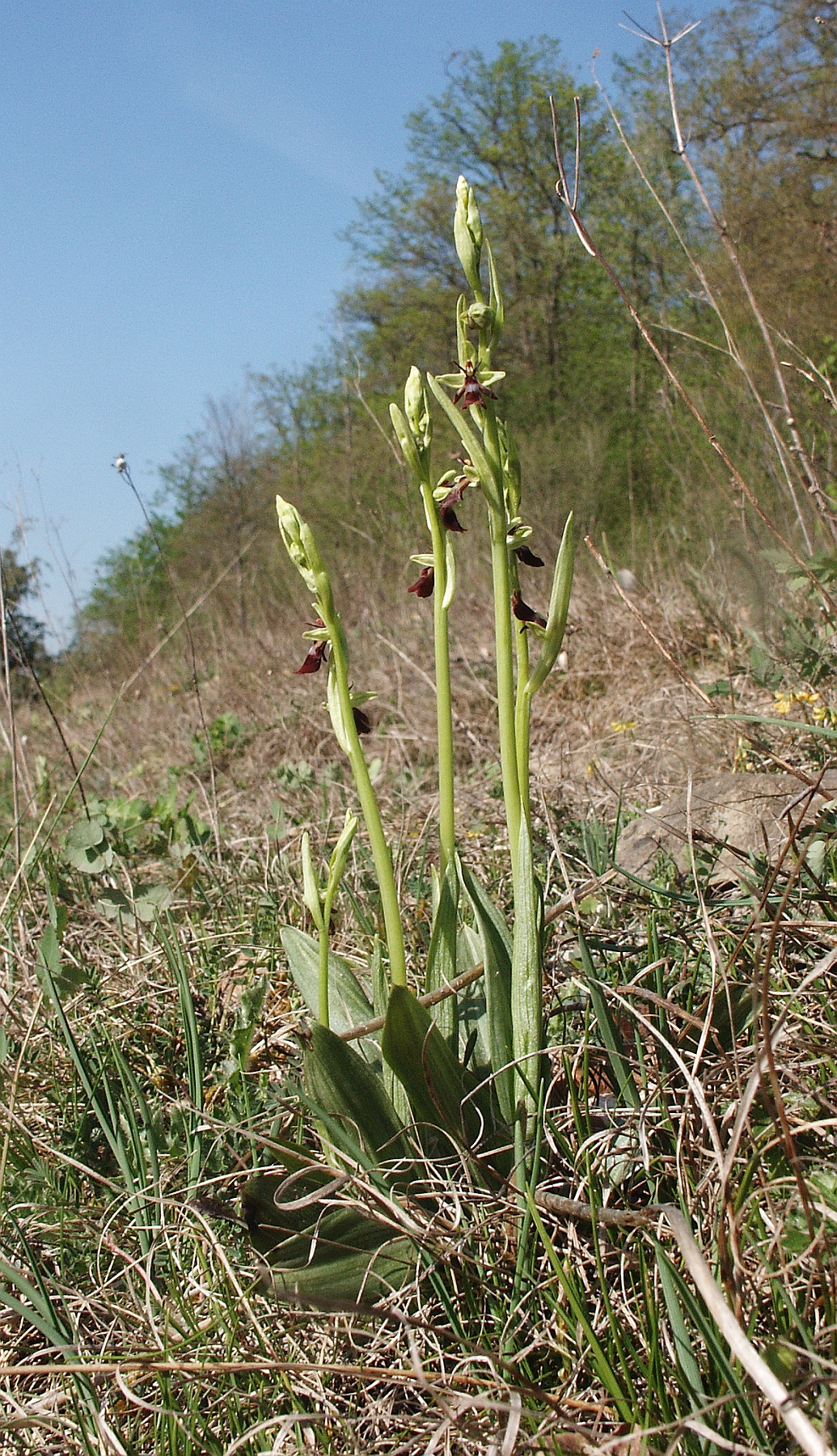
Ophrys insectifera Habitat

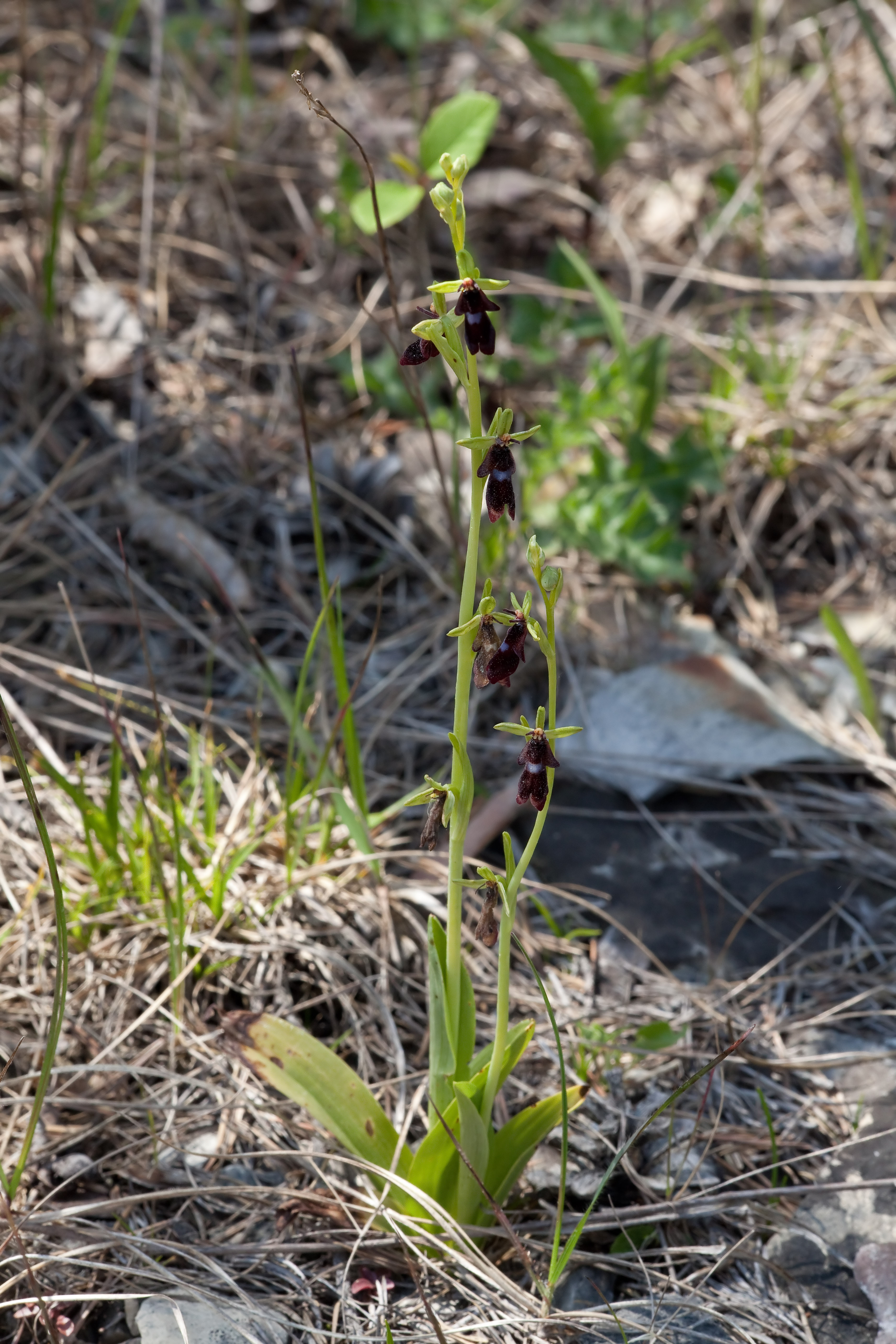
Ophrys insectifera Habitus

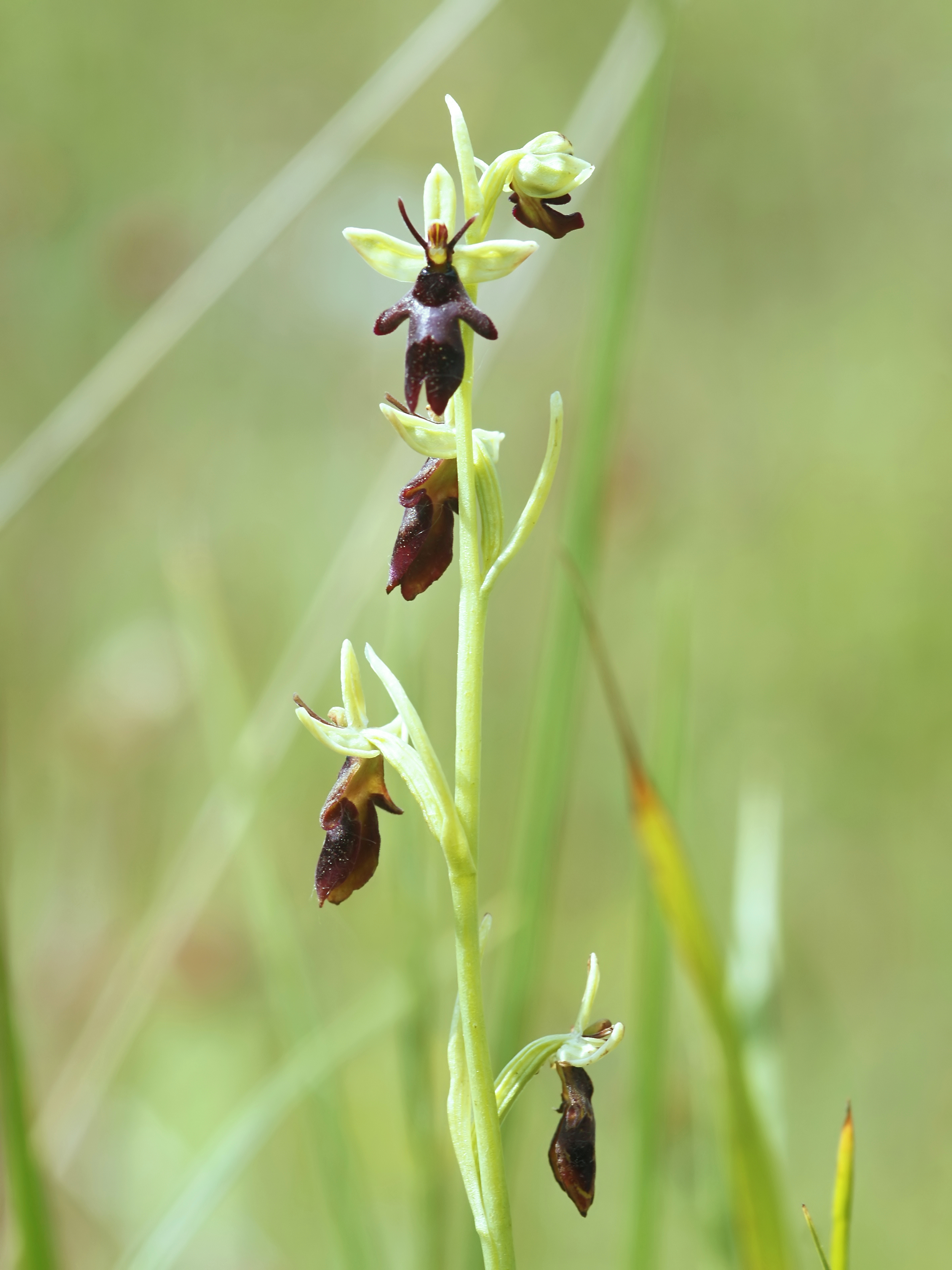
Ophrys insectifera Inflorescence

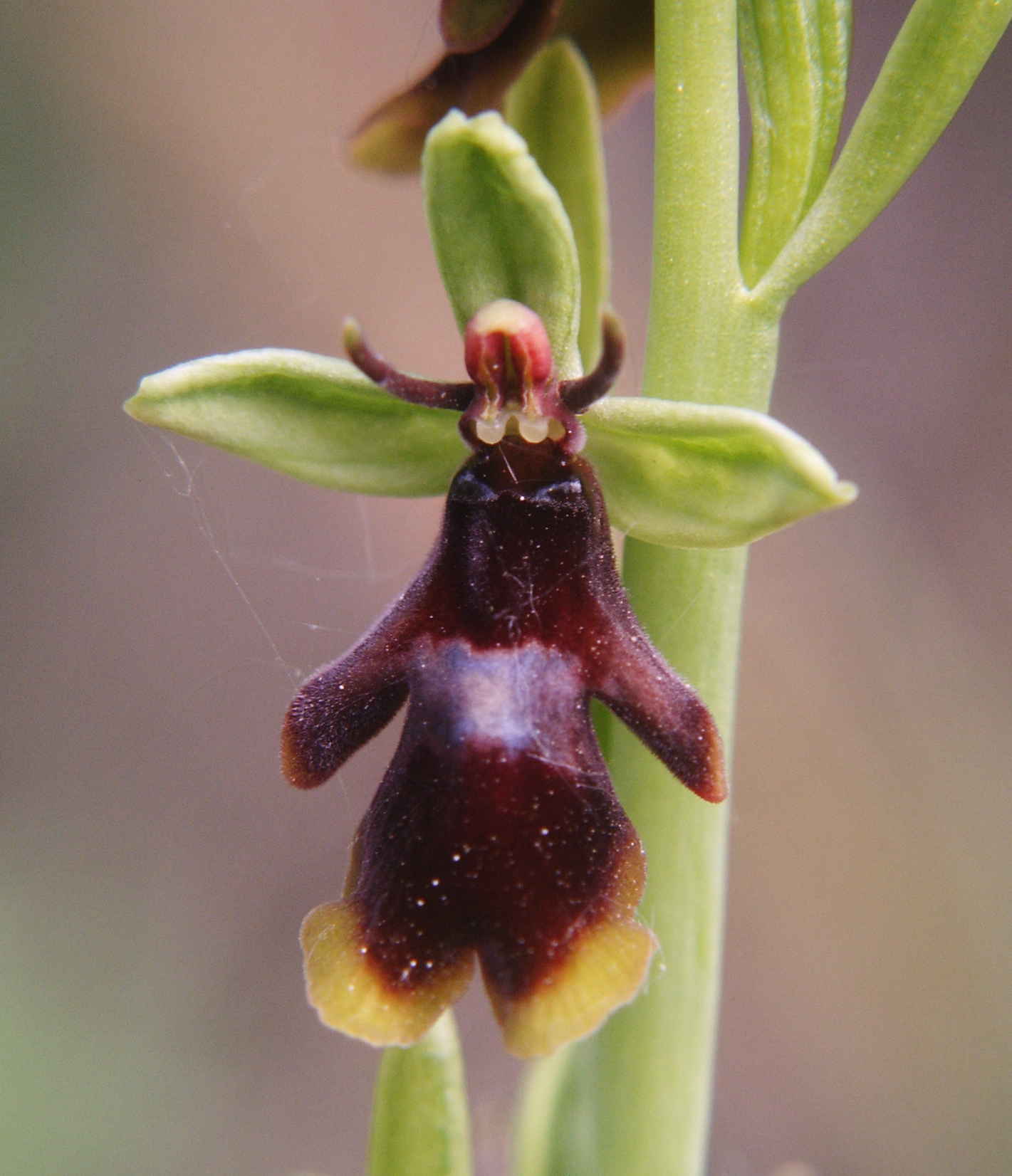
Ophrys insectifera Flower
- EOL images of Ophrys insectifera

== Genus Orchis ==
- Orchis mascula Linnaeus

Distribution.All Ireland. Map

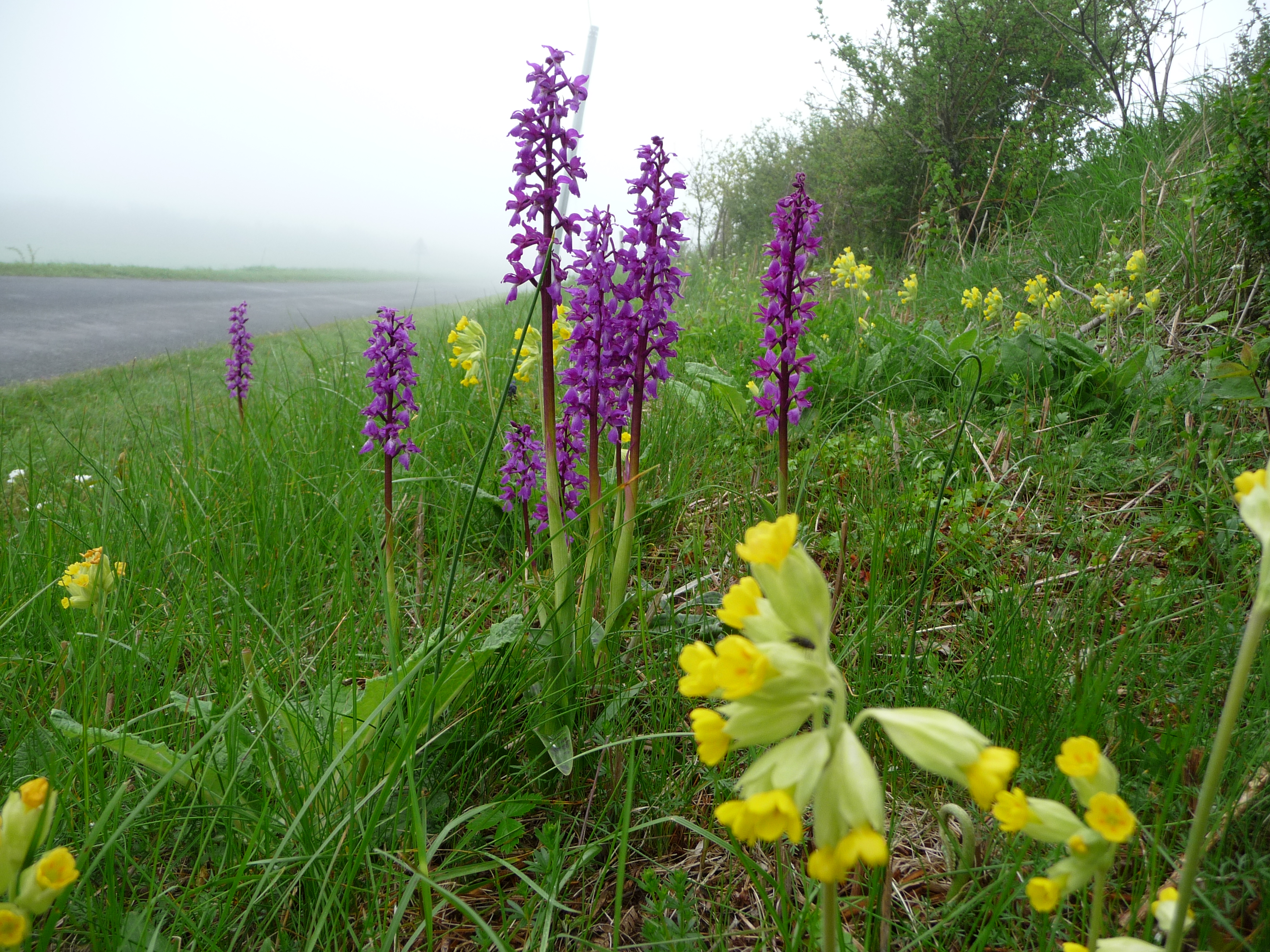
Orchis mascula Habitus

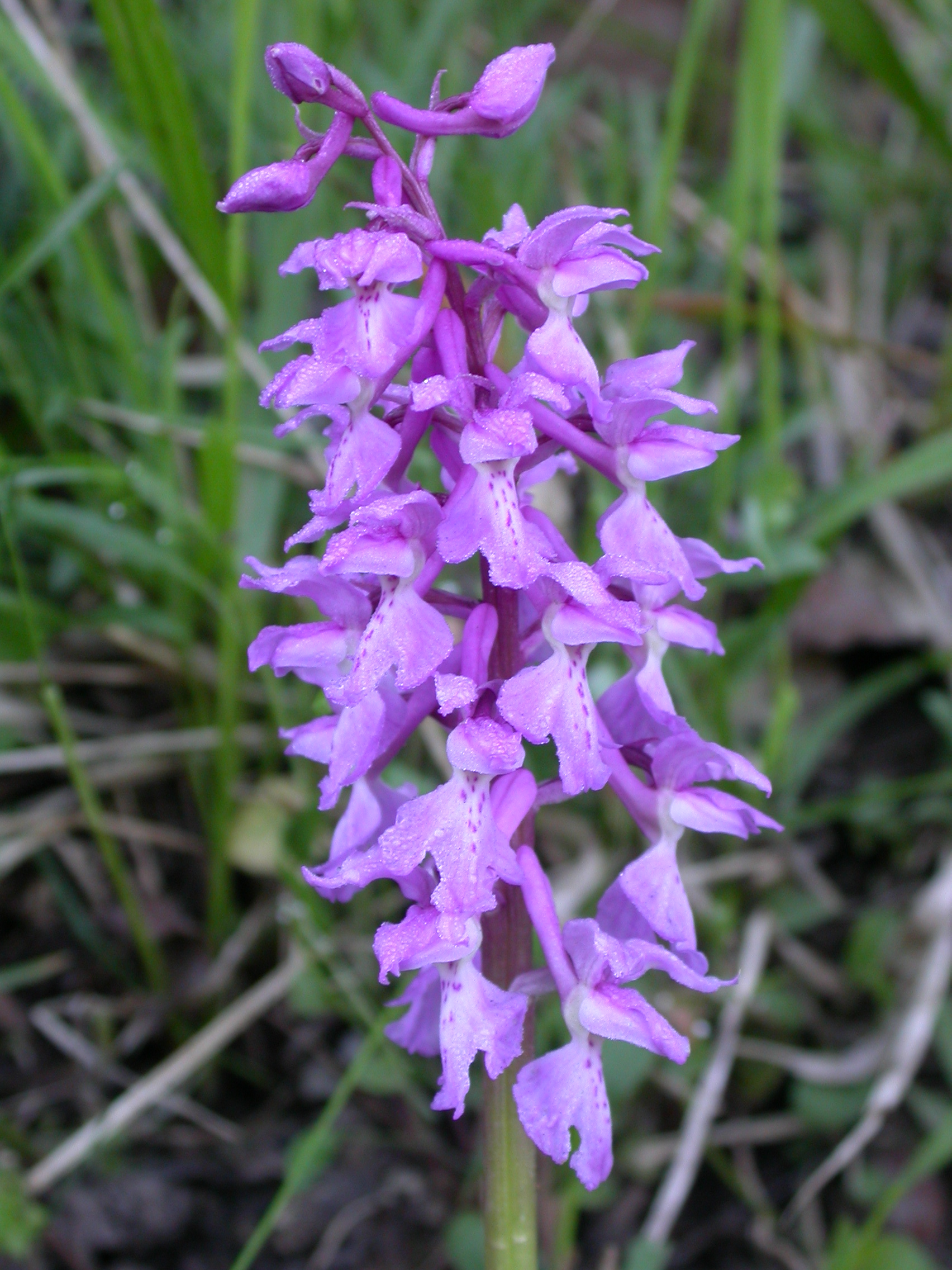
Orchis mascula Inflorescence
- EOL images of Orchis mascula

== Genus Platanthera L.C.M. Richard ==
- Platanthera bifolia (Linnaeus) L.C.M. Richard

Distribution.All Ireland. Map

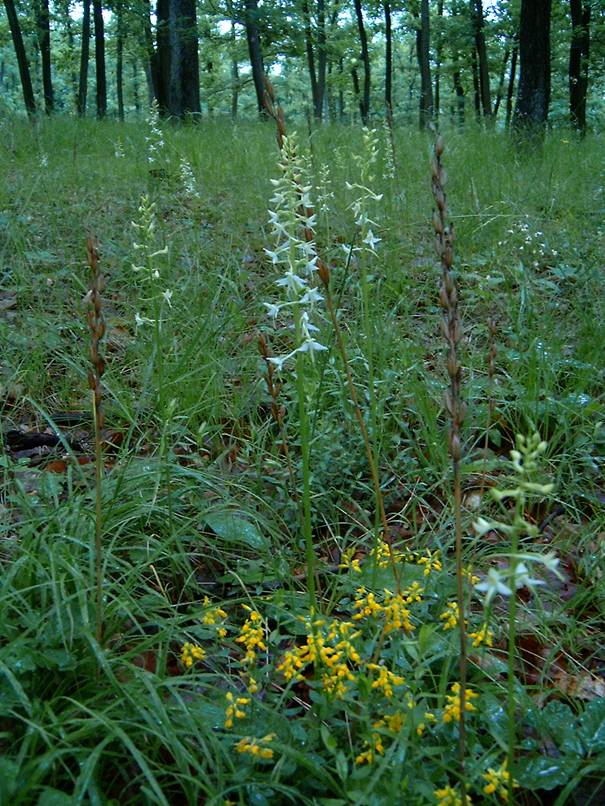
Platanthera bifolia Habitat

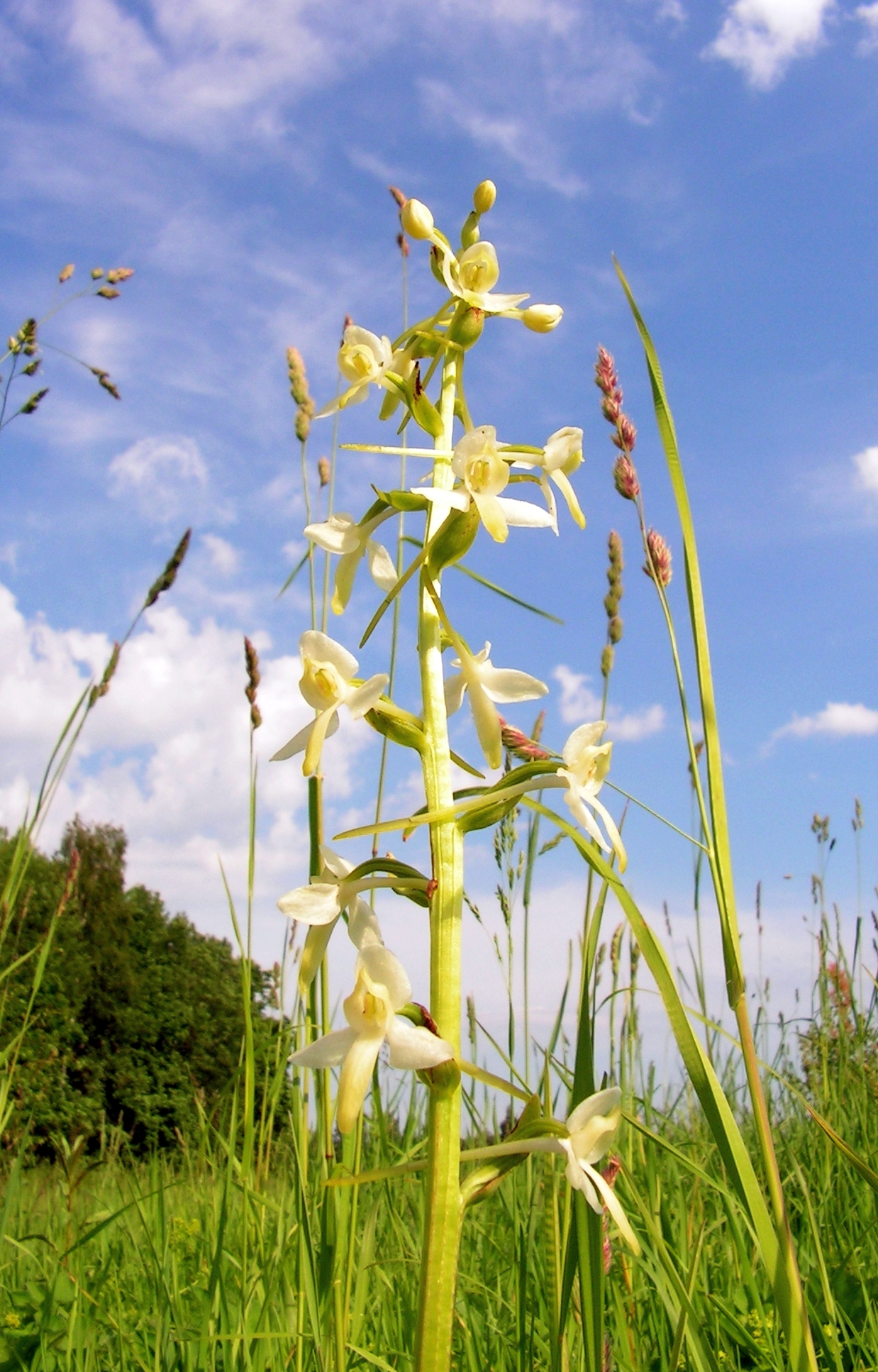
Platanthera bifolia Habitus

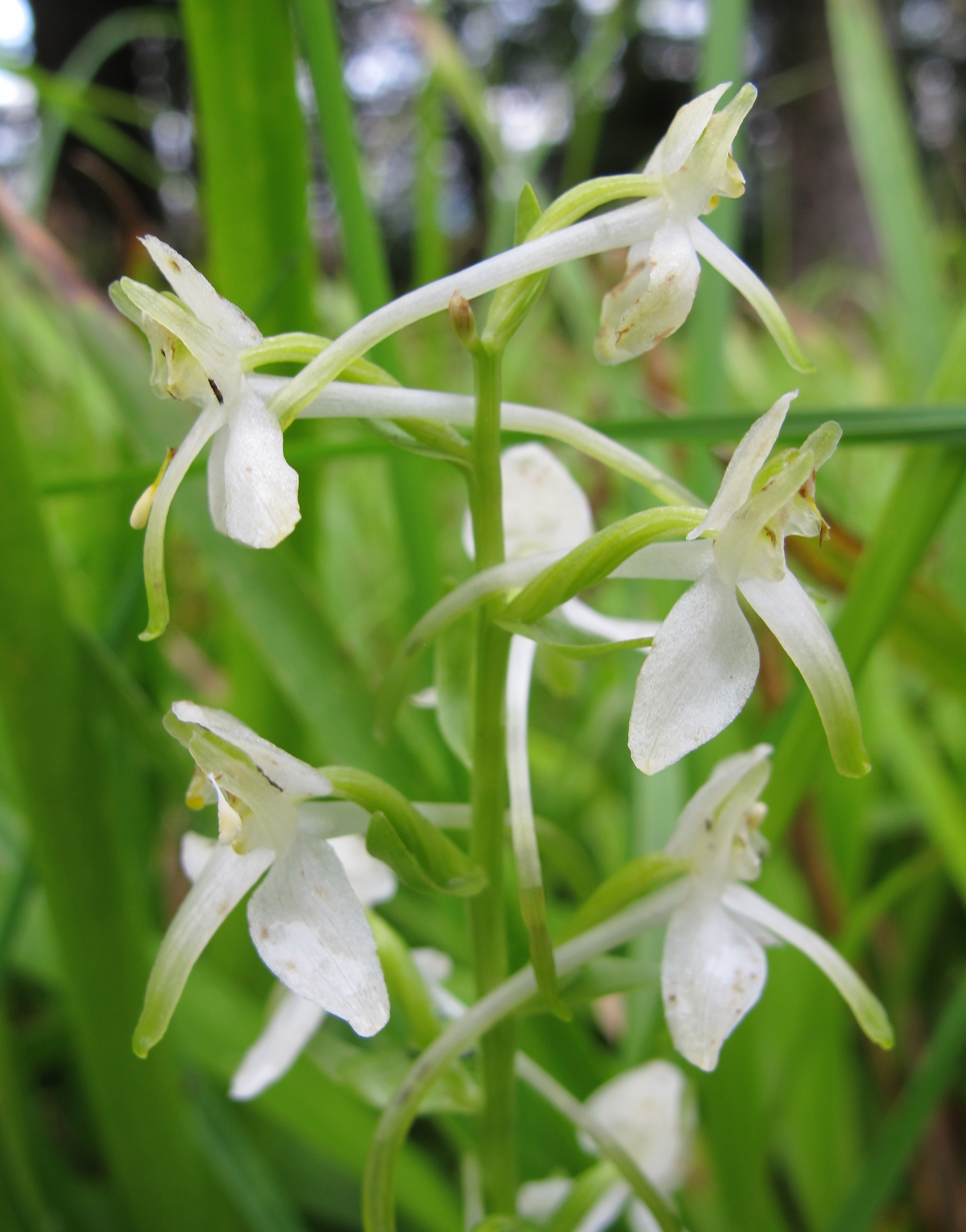
Platanthera bifolia Flower
- EOL images of Platanthera bifolia
- Platanthera chlorantha (Custer) Reichenb.

Distribution.All Ireland. Map

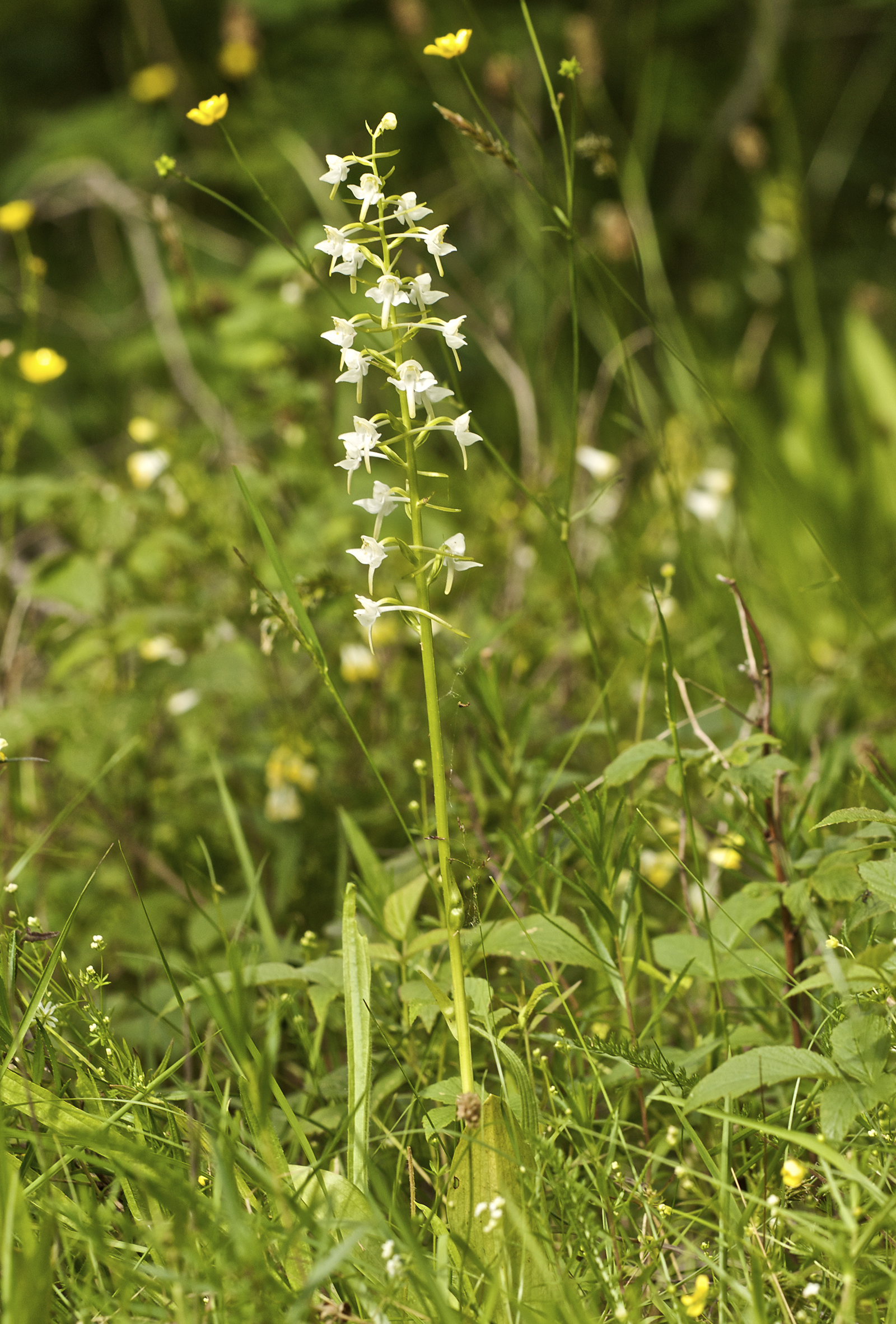
Platanthera chlorantha Habitus

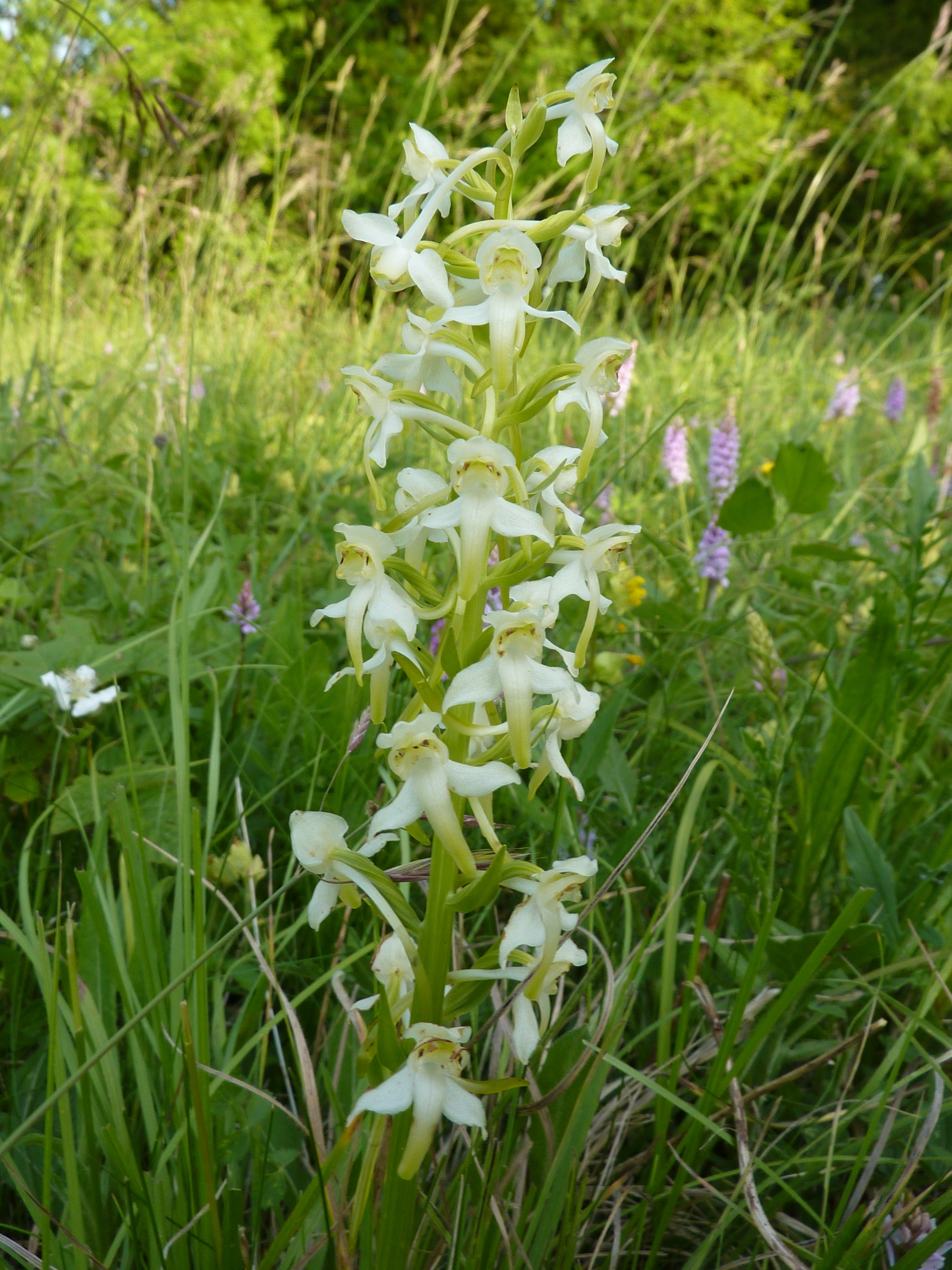
Platanthera chlorantha Inflorescence
- EOL images of Platanthera chlorantha

== Genus Pseudorchis Séguier ==
- Pseudorchis albida (Linnaeus) A. Löve & D. Löve

Distribution.All Ireland. Map Status.Endangered

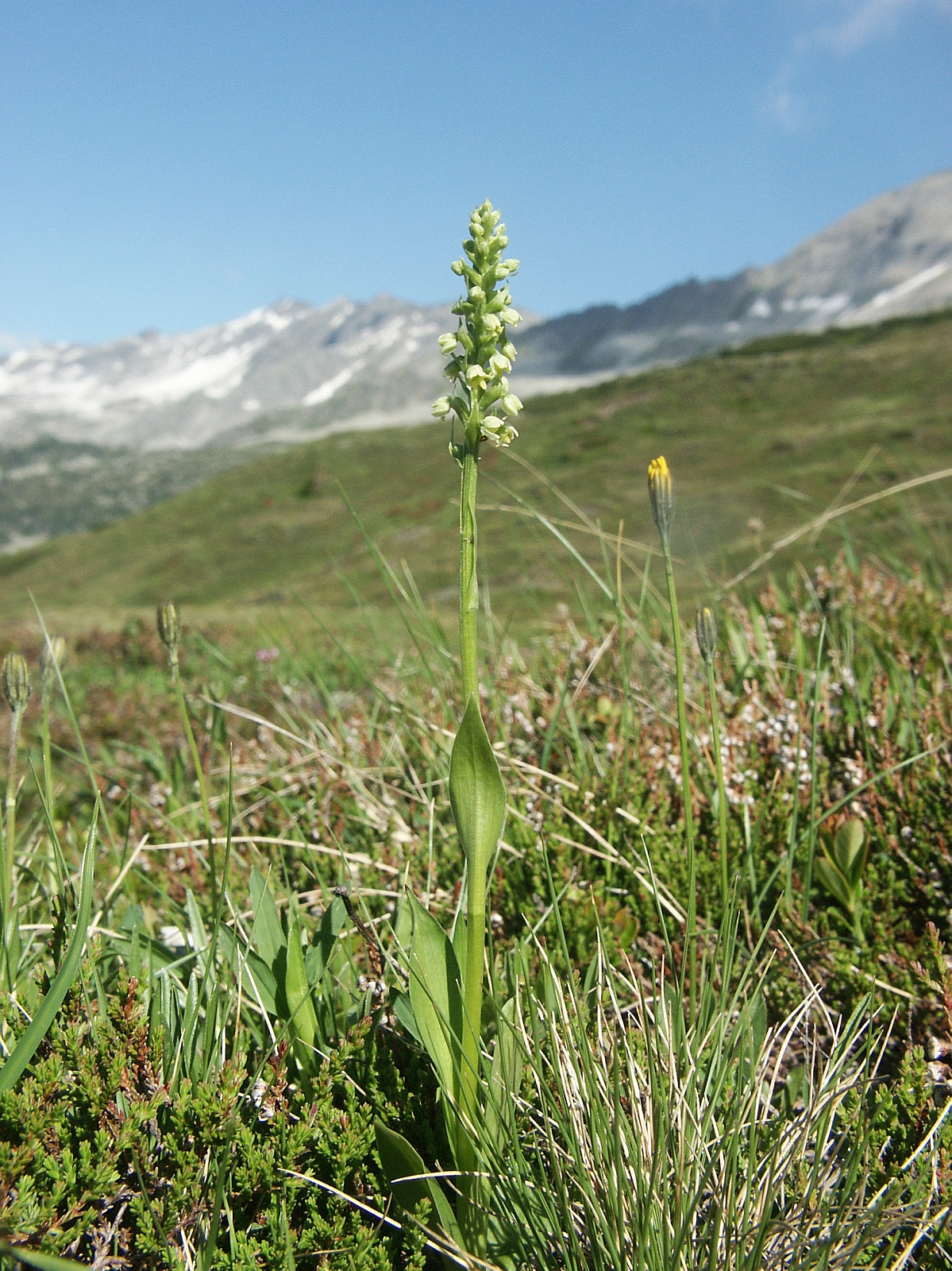
Pseudorchis albida Habitat (Italy)

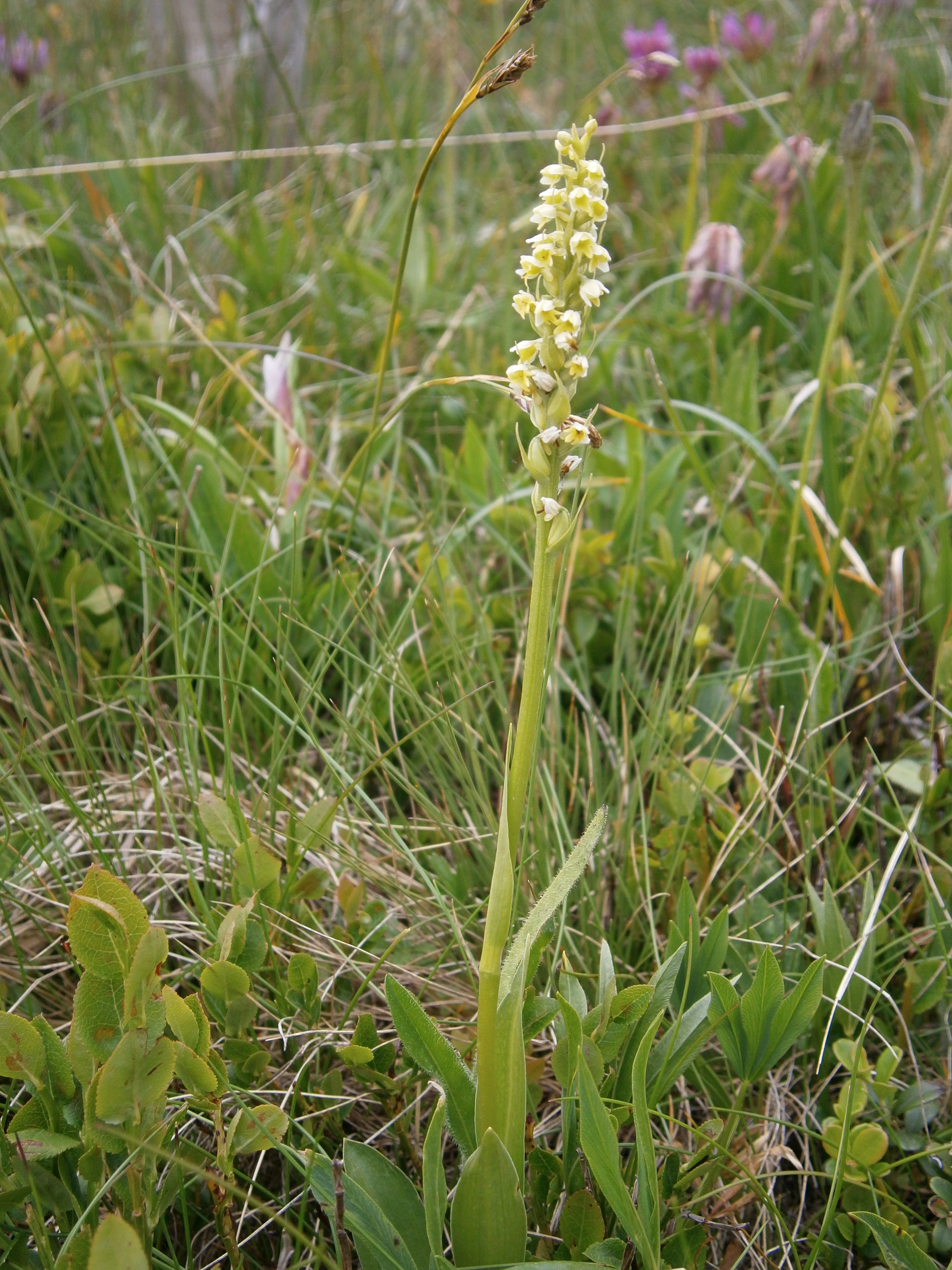
Pseudorchis albida
- EOL images of Pseudorchis albida

== Genus Spiranthes Rich. ==
- Spiranthes spiralis (Linnaeus) Chevall.

Distribution. South Ireland. Map

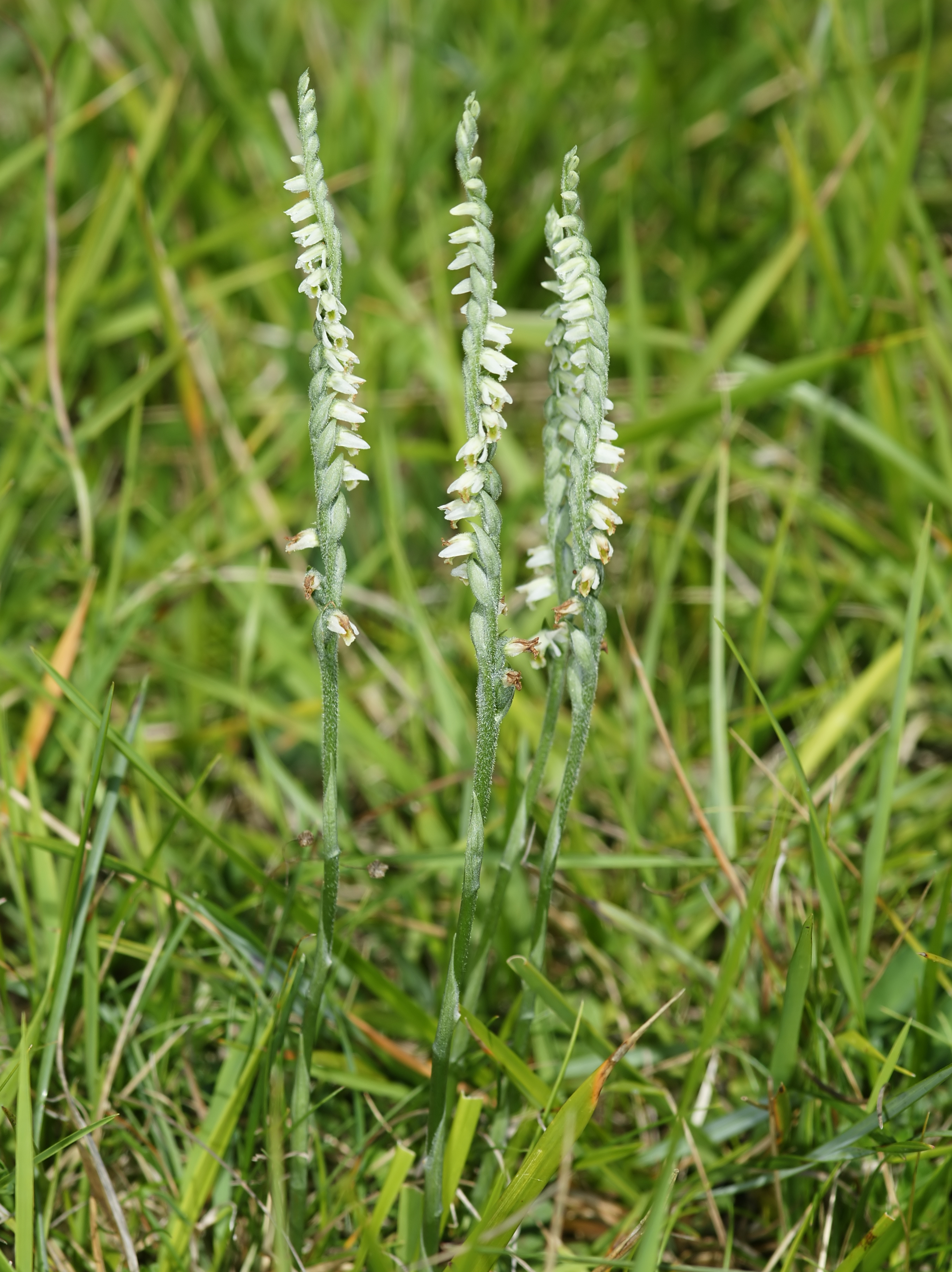
Spiranthes spiralis Habitus

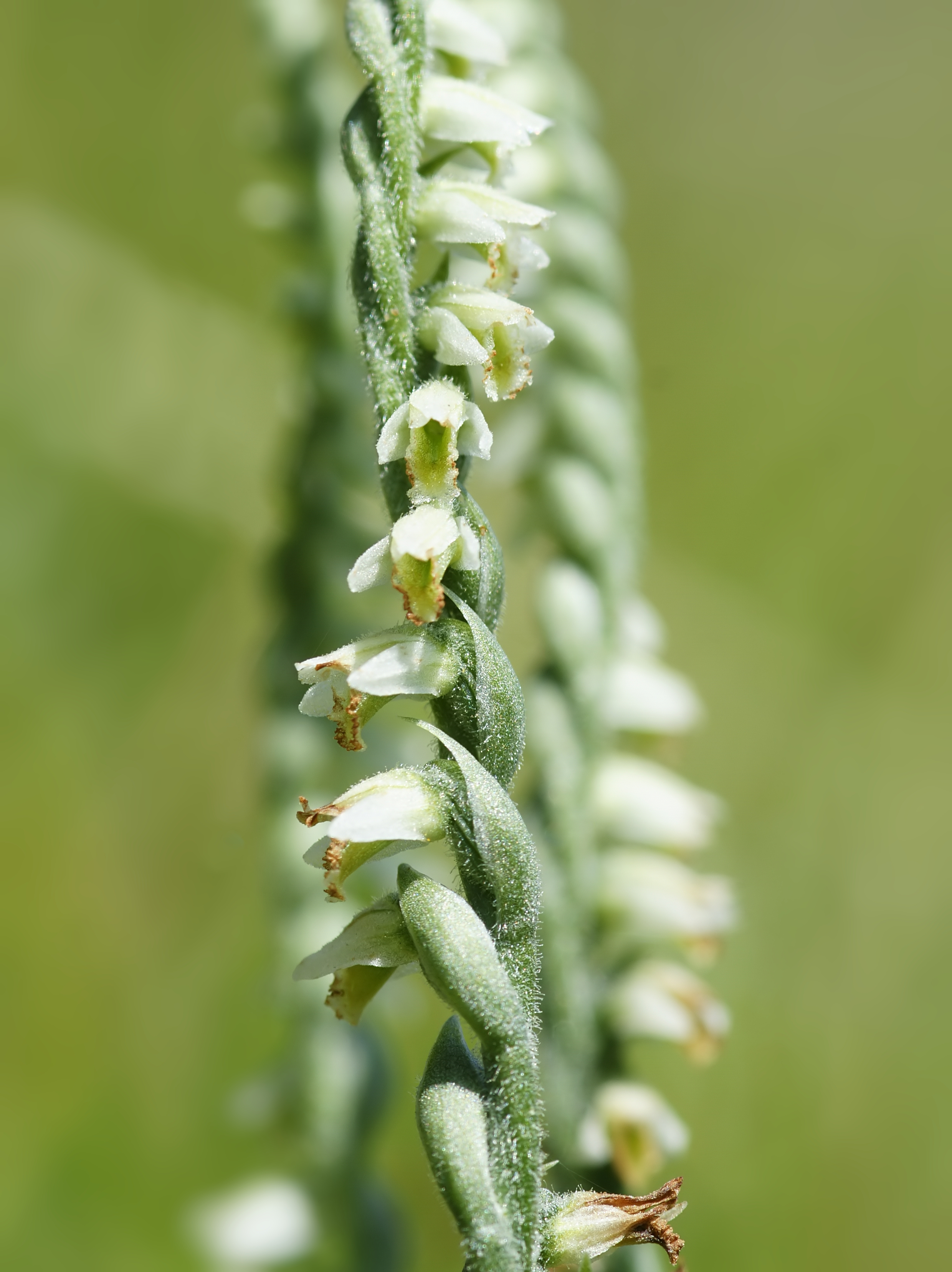
Spiranthes spiralis Flower
- EOL images of Spiranthes spiralis
- Spiranthes romanzoffiana Cham.

Distribution.North, Galway Mayo Buttress and Southwest Map Status. Endangered.

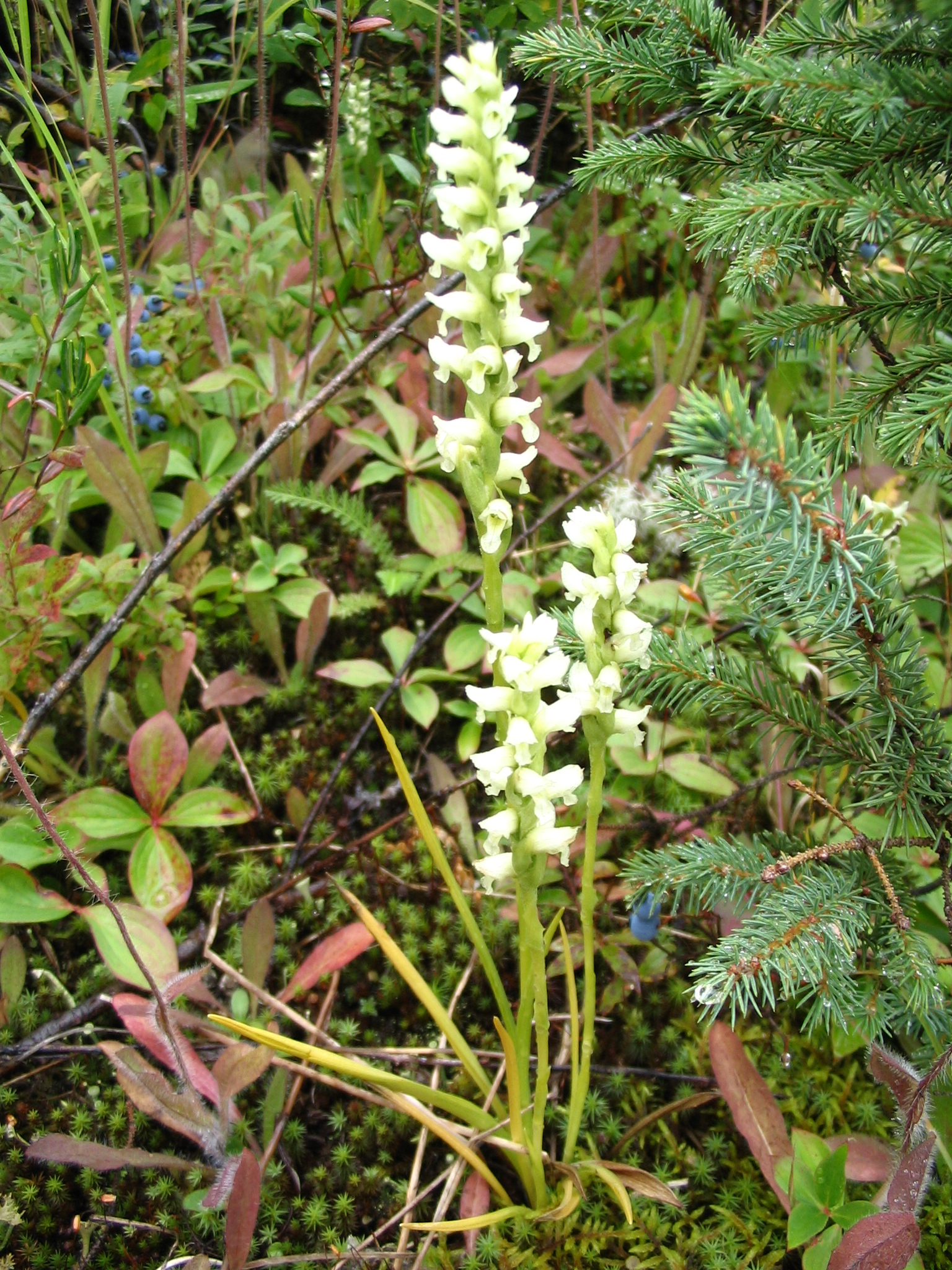
Spiranthes romanzoffiana Habitus

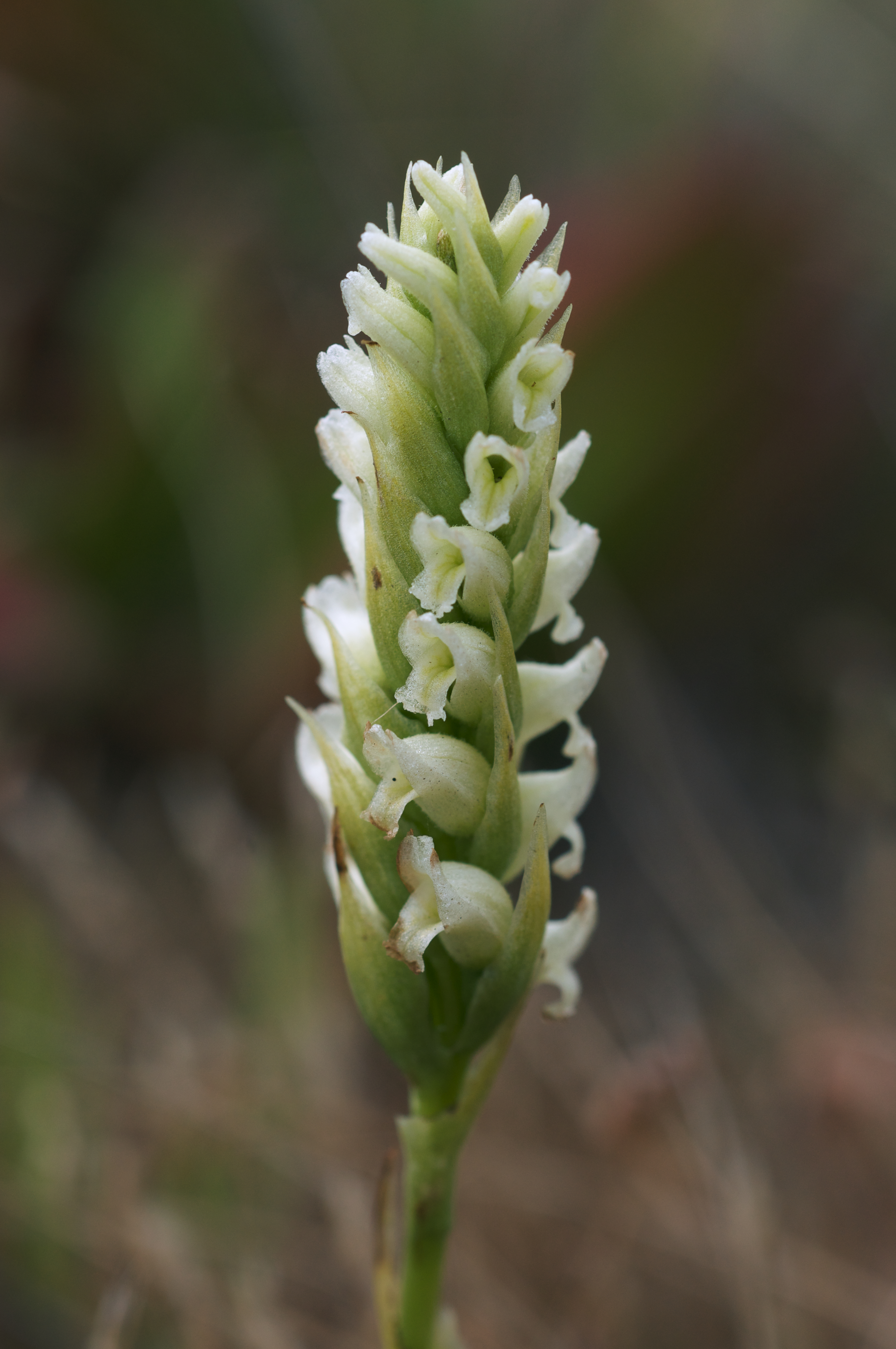
Spiranthes romanzoffiana Flower
- EOL images of Spiranthes romanzoffiana

== Synonyms ==
See WCSP 2012. World Checklist of selected plant families. The Board of Trustees of the Royal Botanic Gardens, Kew. Published on the internet. Accessed: 2012-October-24.

== See also ==
National Biodiversity Network Maps and data
