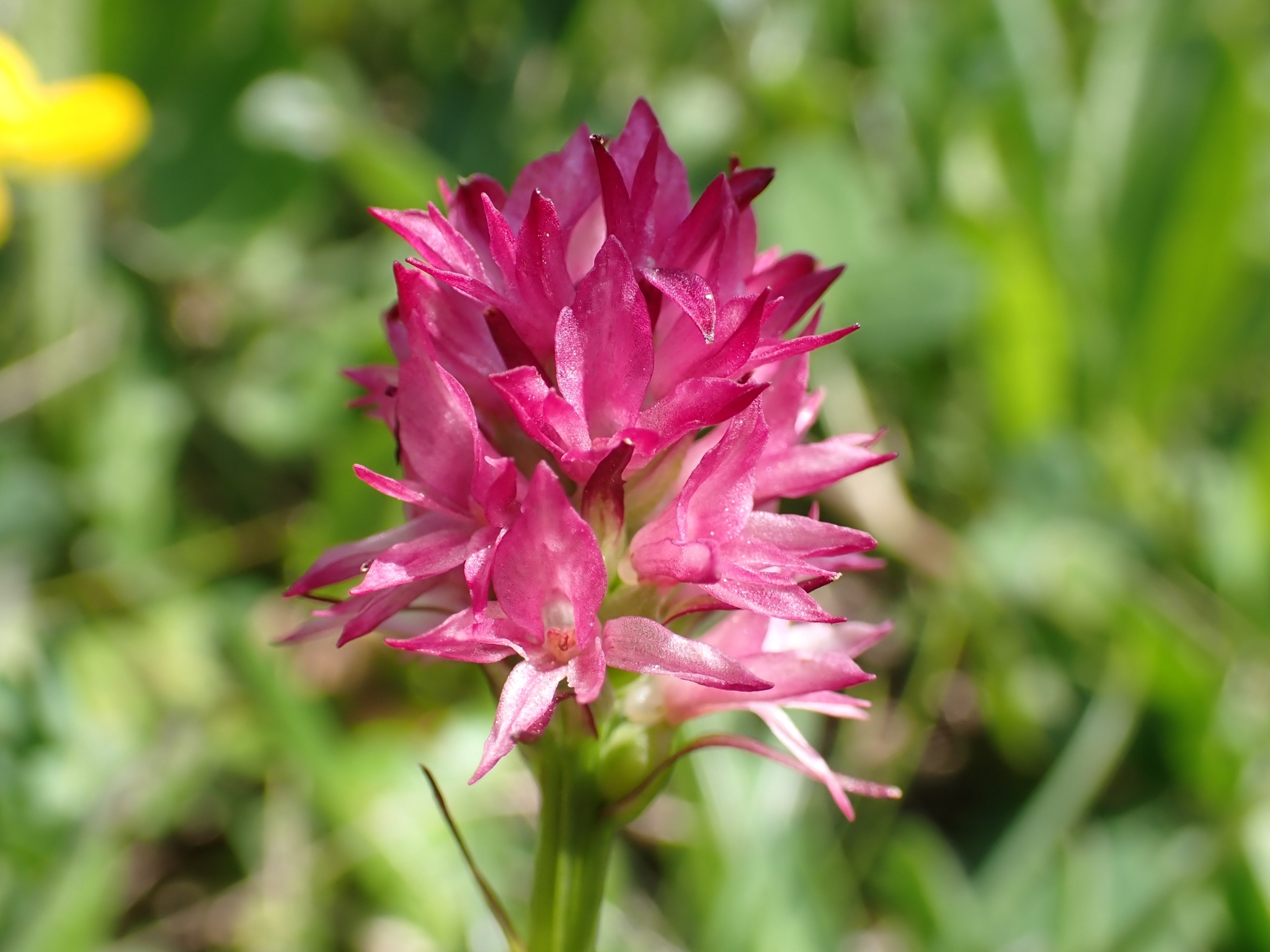

Scientific classification
- Kingdom: Plantae
- Clade: Tracheophytes
- Clade: Angiosperms
- Clade: Monocots
- Order: Asparagales
- Family: Orchidaceae
- Subfamily: Orchidoideae
- Genus: Gymnadenia
- Species: G. dolomitensis

Binomial name
- Gymnadenia dolomitensis Teppner & E.Klein, 1998

Synonyms
- Gymnadenia miniata var. dolomitensis (Teppner & E.Klein) P.Delforge; Gymnadenia rubra var. dolomitensis (Teppner & E.Klein) P.Delforge; Nigritella dolomitensis (Teppner & E.Klein) Hedrén, E.Klein & Teppner; Nigritella rubra subsp. dolomitensis (Teppner & E.Klein) Wenker & S.Wenker; Nigritella rubra var. dolomitensis (Teppner & E.Klein) R.Lorenz & Perazza

= Gymnadenia dolomitensis =

Species of flowering plant

Gymnadenia dolomitensis is a species of orchid found in the Dolomites mountain range of Italy.

== Description ==
Gymandenia dolomitensis is part of the Gymnadenia miniata species complex and hard to distinguish from Gymnadenia miniata, Gymnadenia bicolor and Gymnadenia hygrophila. Flower color is red with a hint of purple, bottom flowers getting a lighter, pinkish color with age. Flowers are widely opened with the lip bent upwards and the side sepals folded in.

== Distribution ==
The holotype was found in the Dolomites in Italy which the species is also named for, growing at an altitude of 2460m. There has since been reports of G. dolomitensis from other locations including Germany and Austria but due to the similarity with other species the distribution outside of Italy is unclear.

== Taxonomy ==
Gymandenia dolomitensis was described in 1998 by Teppner & Klein. They described it as a new species in the same paper that moved all Nigritella species known by then into Gymnadenia.

A morphological comparison by Lorenz and Perazza argued that the later described G. hygrophila and G. bicolor fall within the morphological variability of G. dolomitensis and should be subsumed into G. miniata var. dolomitensis, with G. dolomitensis itself just a variation of G. miniata.
