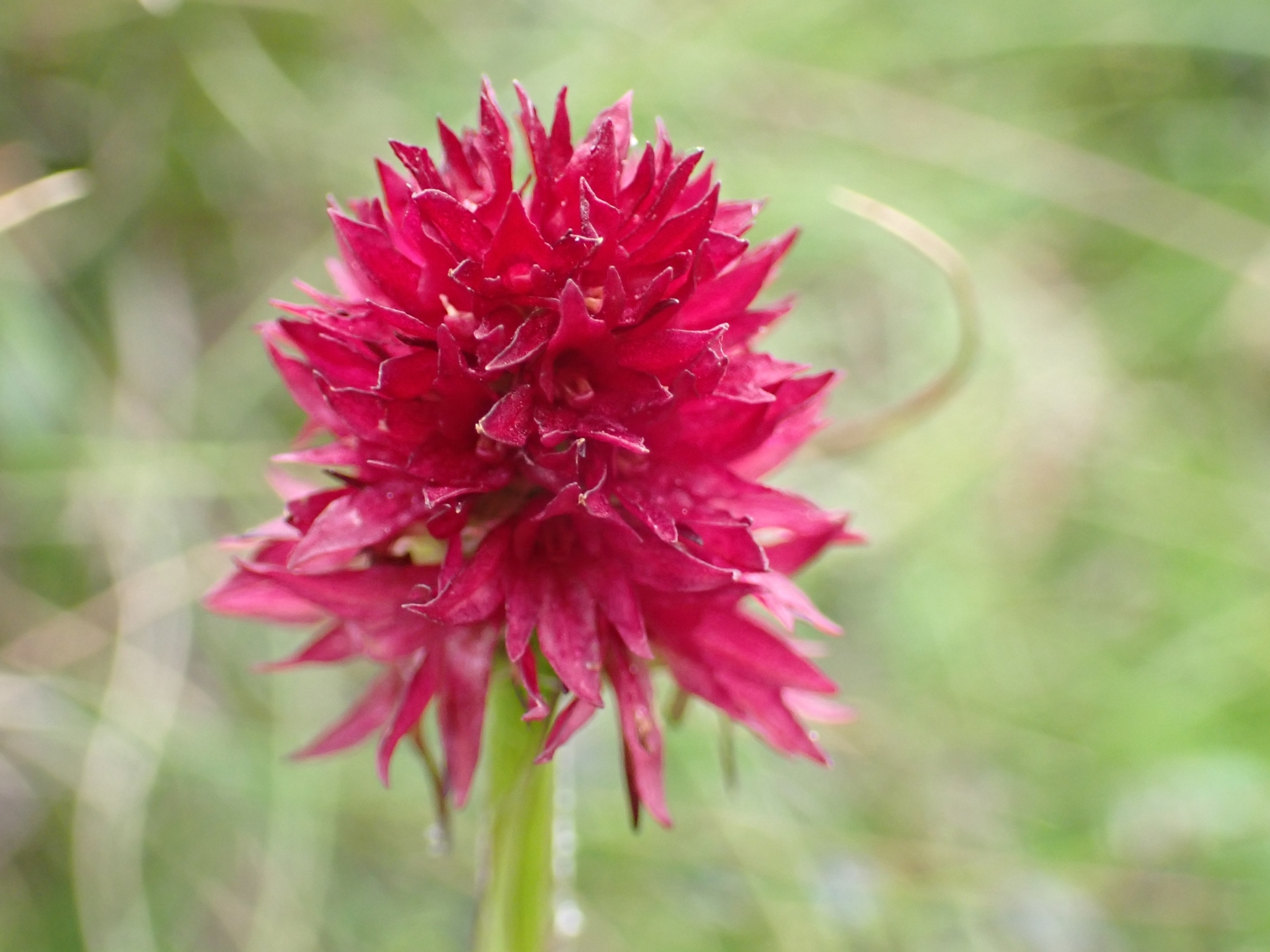

Scientific classification
- Kingdom: Plantae
- Clade: Tracheophytes
- Clade: Angiosperms
- Clade: Monocots
- Order: Asparagales
- Family: Orchidaceae
- Subfamily: Orchidoideae
- Genus: Gymnadenia
- Species: G. hygrophila

Binomial name
- Gymnadenia hygrophila (W.Foelsche & Heidtke) W.Foelsche, Heidtke & O.Gerbaud, 2011

Synonyms
- Gymnadenia miniata f. hygrophila (W.Foelsche & Heidtke) P.Delforge; Gymnadenia rubra f. hygrophila (W.Foelsche & Heidtke) P.Delforge; Nigritella hygrophila W.Foelsche & Heidtke; Nigritella hygrophila var. pauciflora W.Foelsche, G.Foelsche, R.Wüest, E.Merz, M.Gerbaud & O.Gerba

= Gymnadenia hygrophila =

Species of flowering plant

Gymandenia hygrophila is a species of orchid occurring in the southeastern Alps in Italy and Austria.

== Description ==
Gymandenia hygrophila is part of the Gymnadenia miniata species complex and hard to distinguish from Gymnadenia miniata, Gymnadenia bicolor and Gymnadenia dolomitensis. The most distinguishing feature is the shape of the inflorescence when it is starting to bloom - a cone about as high as wide. The flowers have a uniform dark red color and the lips are opened wide.

== Distribution ==
The flowers were first described from Pordoi Pass in Italy and later also found at locations in the northeastern and southeastern Limestone Alps. The species is said to prefer moist conditions (hence the name hygrophila).

== Taxonomy ==
Gymandenia hygrophila was described in 2011 as Nigritella hygrophila by Foelsche & Heidtke and then renamed to Gymnadenia hygrophila.

A morphological comparison by Lorenz and Perazza argued that Gymandenia hygrophila and Gymandenia bicolor look too similar to Gymnadenia dolomitensis to be considered separate species and that Gymnadenia dolomitensis should be considered a variation of Gymnadenia miniata. However it is unclear if the plants they compared to were actually Gymnadenia miniata (Crantz) Hayek sensu stricto.
