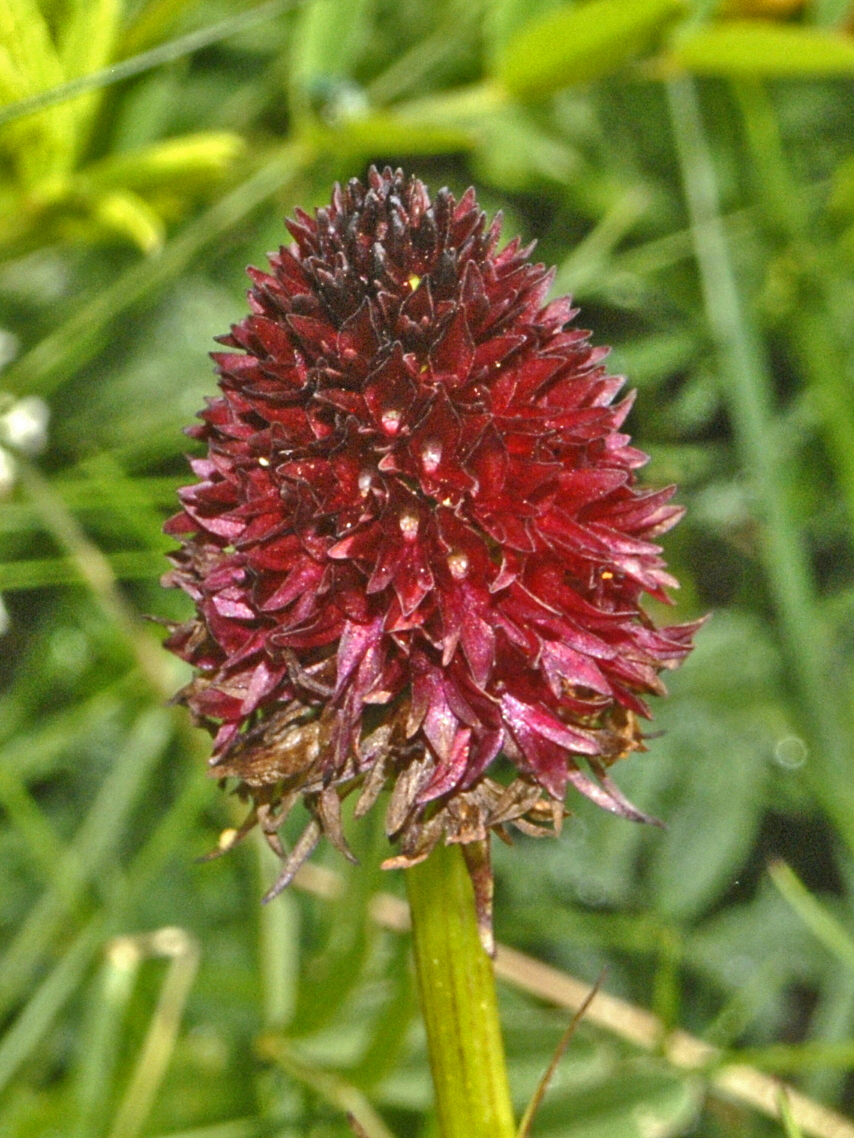
- Gymnadenia × chanousiana at the Giardino Botanico Alpino Chanousia

Scientific classification
- Kingdom: Plantae
- Clade: Tracheophytes
- Clade: Angiosperms
- Clade: Monocots
- Order: Asparagales
- Family: Orchidaceae
- Subfamily: Orchidoideae
- Genus: Gymnadenia
- Species: G. × chanousiana

Binomial name
- Gymnadenia × chanousiana G.Foelsche & W.Foelsche

Synonyms
- Gymnadenia suaveolens (Vill.) Wettst.; × Gymnigritella chanousiana (G.Foelsche & W.Foelsche) W.Foelsche; × Gymnigritella girodii Gillot ex E.G.Camus; × Gymnigritella suaveolens (Vill.) E.G.Camus; Orchis × suaveolens Vill.

= Gymnadenia × chanousiana =

Species of flowering plant

Gymnadenia × chanousiana, common name Chanous' gymnadenia, is a natural hybrid between Gymnadenia conopsea and Nigritella rhellicani (syn. Nigritella cenisia).

== Description ==
This small-sized cold-growing orchid blooms in the summer.

== Distribution and habitat ==
This orchid can be found in the Alps to NW Balkan Peninsula (France, Switzerland, Austria, Italy and Yugoslavia) at elevations of 1,350–2,100 metres (4,430–6,890 ft) above sea level.
