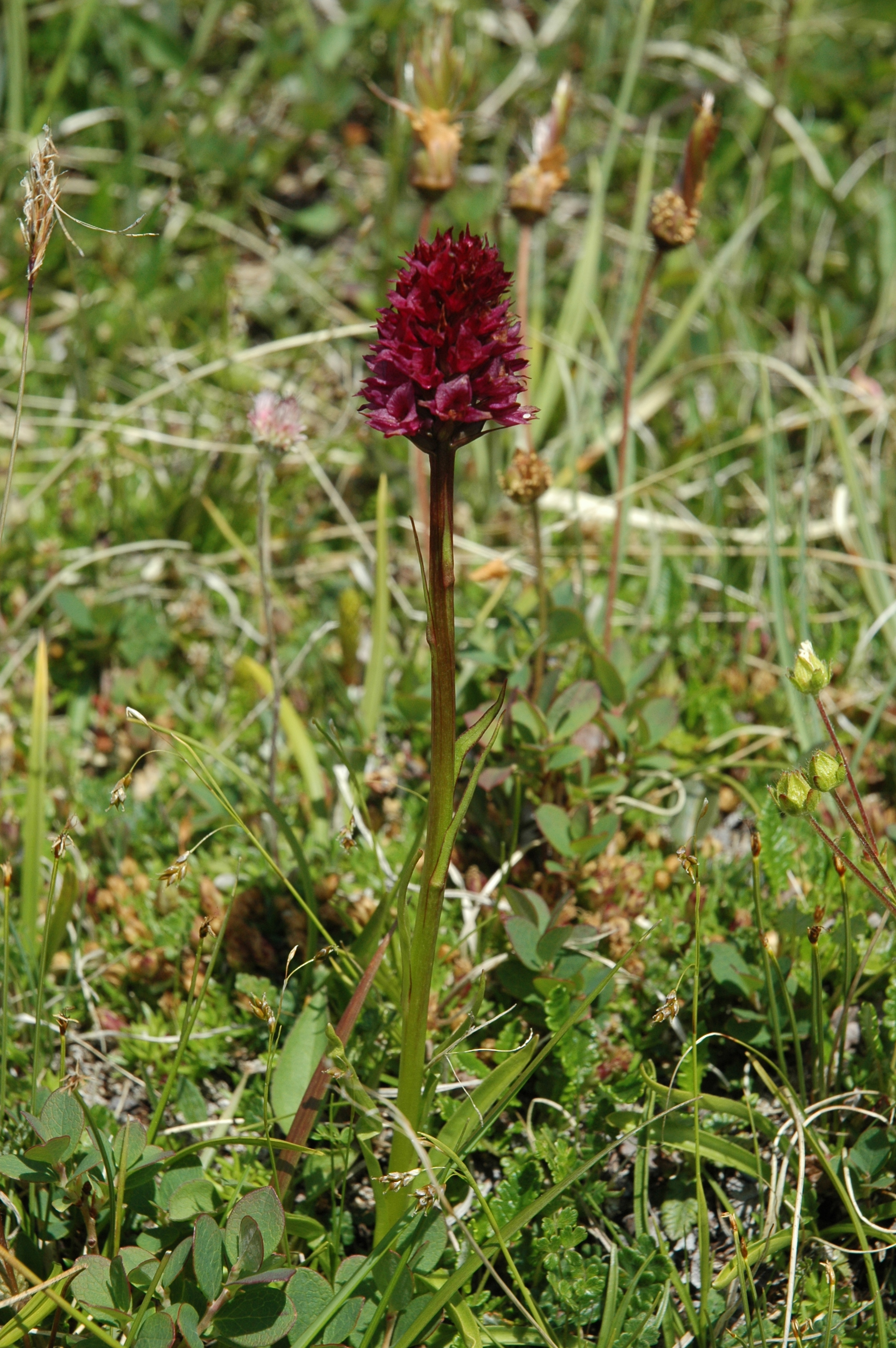

Scientific classification
- Kingdom: Plantae
- Clade: Tracheophytes
- Clade: Angiosperms
- Clade: Monocots
- Order: Asparagales
- Family: Orchidaceae
- Subfamily: Orchidoideae
- Genus: Gymnadenia
- Species: G. runei

Binomial name
- Gymnadenia runei (L.) R.Br.

= Gymnadenia runei =

Species of orchid

Gymnadenia runei is an orchid in the genus Gymnadenia. It is endemic to the Tärnaby mountains in the central north of Sweden, and found in localities like calcium rich meadows. The species was discovered by Swedish botanist Olof Rune in 1960, and initially considered to be a hybrid between G. conopsea and G. nigra. In 1989, based on DNA research, it was reclassified as a separate species, originally under the name Gymnigritella runei.
