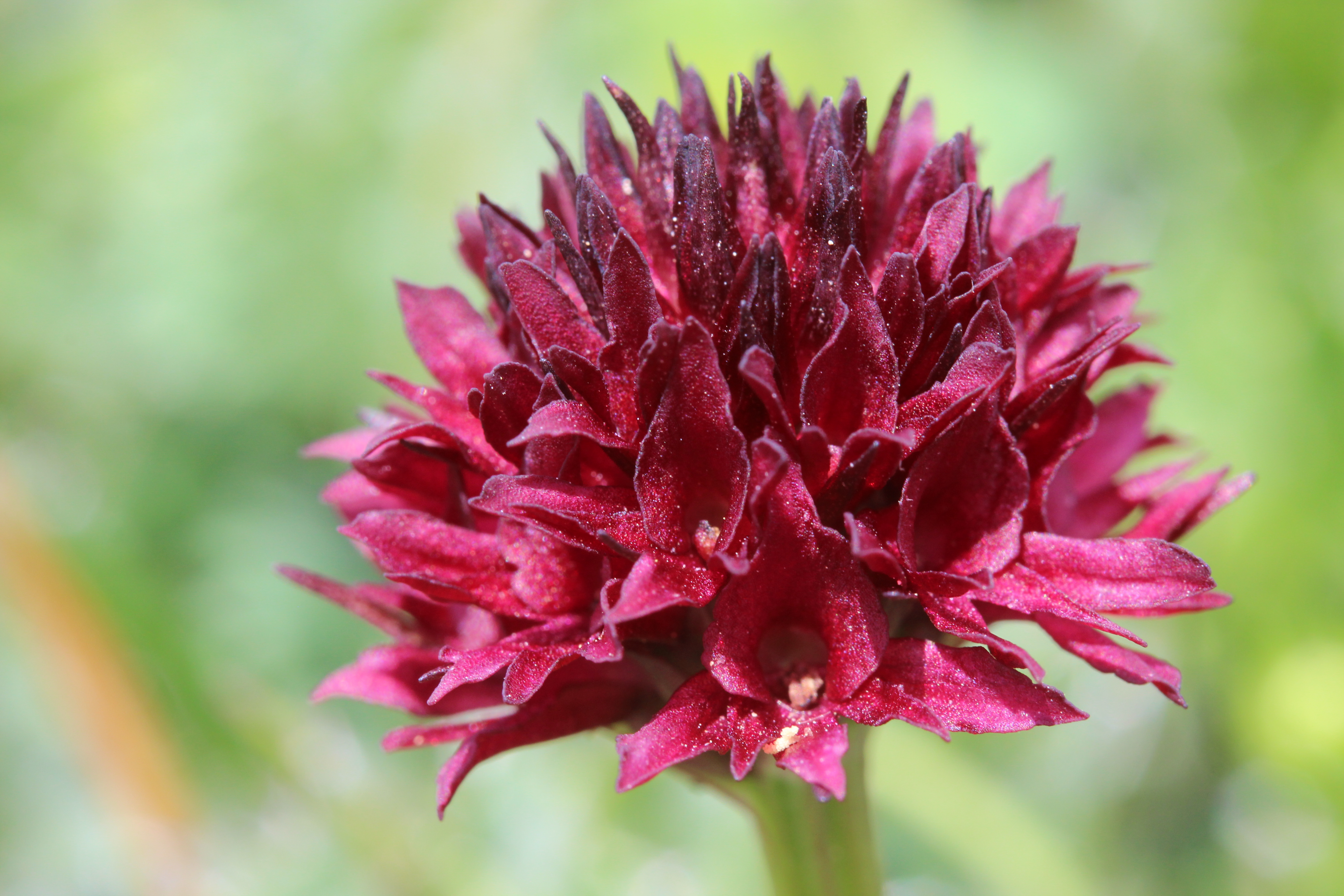

Scientific classification
- Kingdom: Plantae
- Clade: Tracheophytes
- Clade: Angiosperms
- Clade: Monocots
- Order: Asparagales
- Family: Orchidaceae
- Subfamily: Orchidoideae
- Genus: Gymnadenia
- Species: G. austriaca

Binomial name
- Gymnadenia austriaca Delforge, 1998

= Gymnadenia austriaca =

Species of flowering plant

Gymnadenia austriaca is a species of plant in the family Orchidaceae. It is endemic to the Alps and the Pyrenees, where it grows on calcareous alpine grassland from 1,500–2,500 metres (4,900–8,200 ft). It was first described by Teppner and Klein as a subspecies of Nigratella nigra (ssp austriaca) and was subsequently reclassified as G. austriaca as an apomictic member of the G. nigra group within the genus Gymnadenia.
