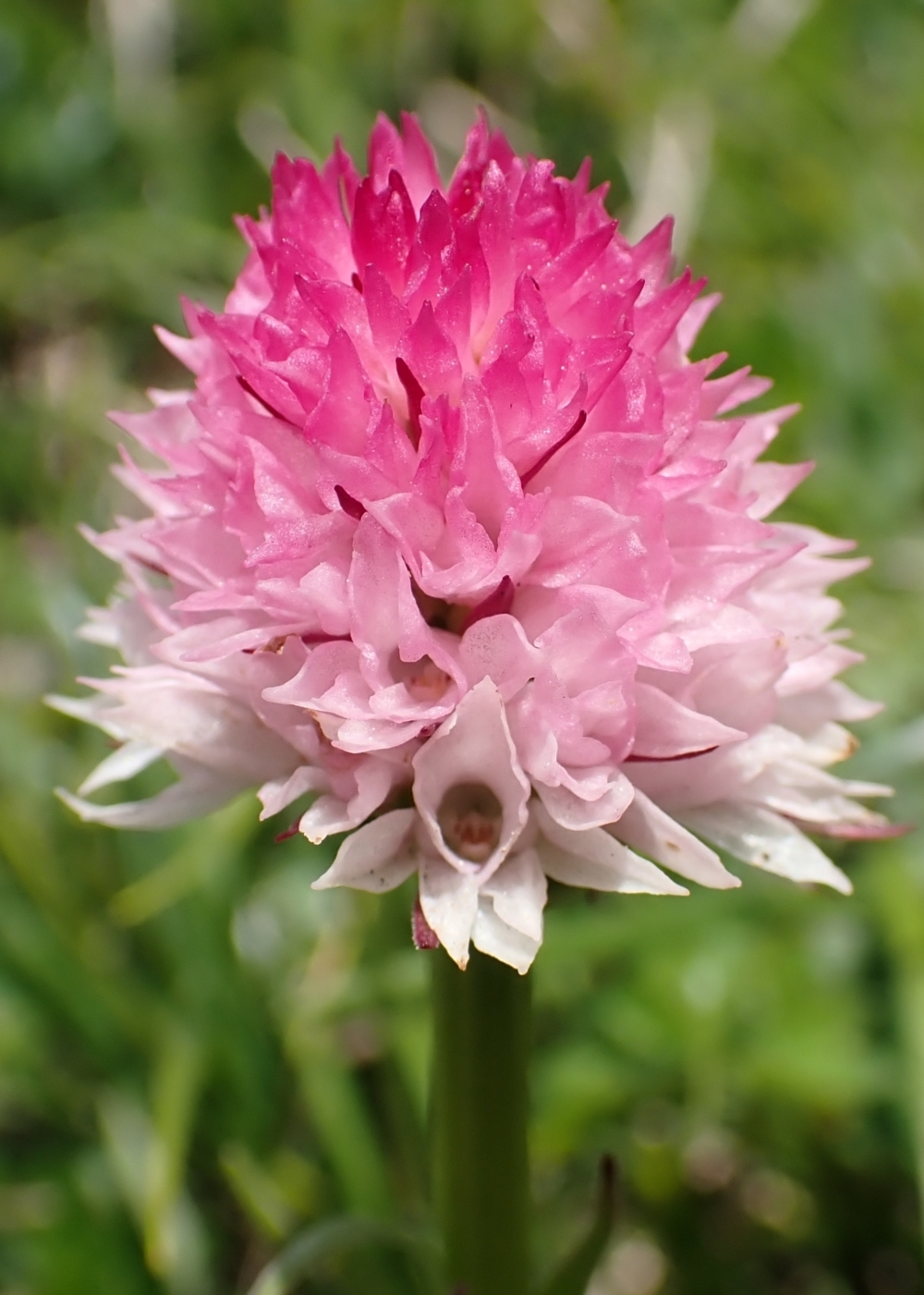

Conservation status
- Endangered (IUCN 3.1)

Scientific classification
- Kingdom: Plantae
- Clade: Tracheophytes
- Clade: Angiosperms
- Clade: Monocots
- Order: Asparagales
- Family: Orchidaceae
- Subfamily: Orchidoideae
- Genus: Gymnadenia
- Species: G. widderi

Binomial name
- Gymnadenia widderi (Teppner & E. Klein) Teppner & E. Klein

Synonyms
- Nigritella widderi Teppner & E. Klein

= Gymnadenia widderi =

Species of orchid

Gymnadenia widderi is a species of orchid native to the central Alps and central Italy.
