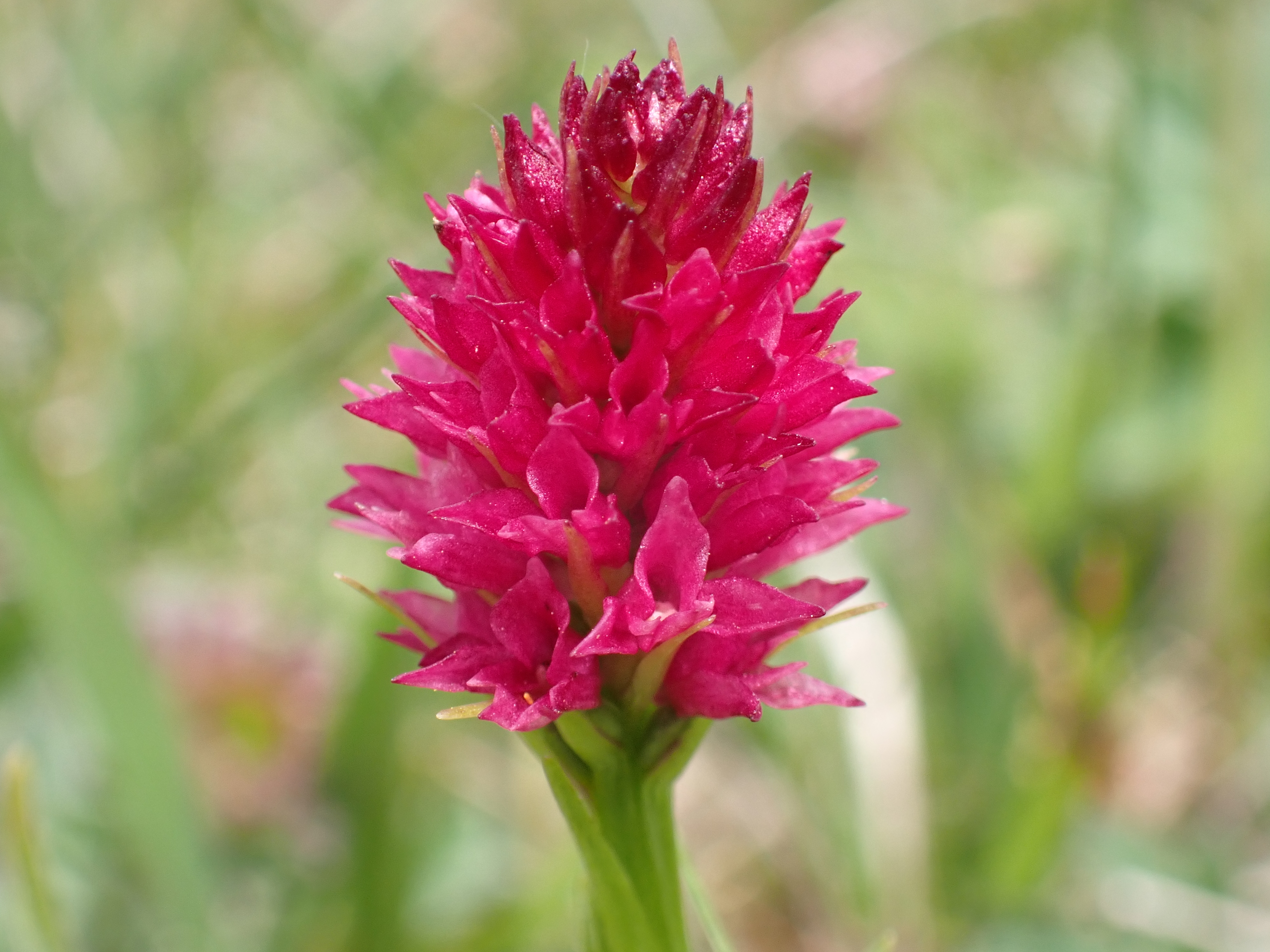

Scientific classification
- Kingdom: Plantae
- Clade: Tracheophytes
- Clade: Angiosperms
- Clade: Monocots
- Order: Asparagales
- Family: Orchidaceae
- Subfamily: Orchidoideae
- Genus: Gymnadenia
- Species: G. minor

Binomial name
- Gymnadenia minor (W.Foelsche & Zernig) W.Foelsche, Zernig & O.Gerbaud, 2011

Synonyms
- Nigritella minor W.Foelsche & Zernig

= Gymnadenia minor =

Species of flowering plant

Gymnadenia minor is a species of orchid endemic to Austria.

== Description ==
Gymnadenia minor, in the sub-genus Nigritella (the vanilla orchids) has the smallest plants of all Gymnadenia species. It looks similar to Gymnadenia miniata but both the entire plants and the individual flowers are smaller and the inflorescence is shorter, sometimes wider than tall. Unlike all other Nigritella species bracts have no dark red border but are bright green with red tips. Flowers are uniformly colored red (except the bottom-most ones are sometimes brighter), their color shade is slightly brighter than that of Gymnadenia miniata. The two side petals are narrower than the two side sepals.

== Distribution ==
Gymandenia minor is only known from the slopes of the Trenchtling in the Hochschwab mountain range.

== Taxonomy ==
Gymandenia minor was described in 2007 as Nigritella minor by Foelsche & Zernig after discovering a small meadow with the new plants. Unlike several other Nigritella species described around the same time it is morphologically well separated from all other species in the genus. The likely origin of the species is a local mutation after a single seed of Gymnadenia miniata germinated at the site of the only known population.
