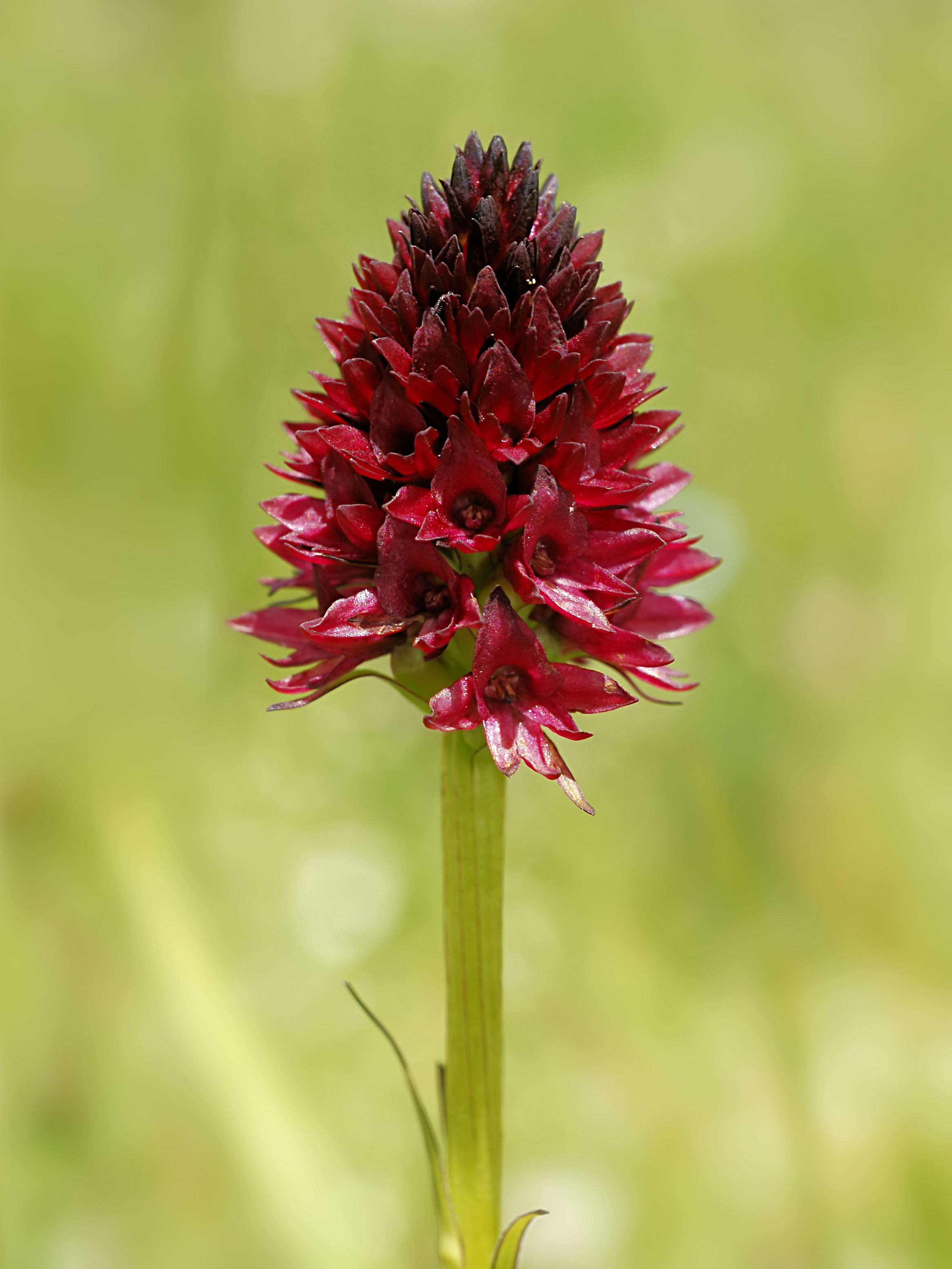

Conservation status
- Least Concern (IUCN 3.1)

Scientific classification
- Kingdom: Plantae
- Clade: Tracheophytes
- Clade: Angiosperms
- Clade: Monocots
- Order: Asparagales
- Family: Orchidaceae
- Subfamily: Orchidoideae
- Genus: Gymnadenia
- Species: G. rhellicani

Binomial name
- Gymnadenia rhellicani (Teppner & E. Klein) Teppner & E. Klein

Synonyms
- Nigritella rhellicani Teppner & E. Klein; Nigritella nigra subsp. rhellicani (Teppner & E. Klein) H. Baumann, Künkele & R. Lorenz

= Gymnadenia rhellicani =

Species of orchid

Gymnadenia rhellicani (common name: dark vanilla orchid or black vanilla orchid) is a European species of orchid.

== Description ==
Gymnadenia rhellicani grows 5–22 centimetres (2.0–8.7 in) high, with a dense, globose to cylindrical inflorescence of red-brown to chocolate-brown flowers with a chocolate-like aroma. Some plants, especially in the south of the species' range have noticeably paler flowers.

== Distribution ==
Gymnadenia rhellicani grows in the Alps and Carpathians at elevations of 1,000–2,800 metres (3,300–9,200 ft).

== Taxonomy ==
The species was described as a distinct species in 1990 by Herwig Teppner and Erich Klein, who noted that it was diploid and reproduced sexually, in contrast to the rest of the wider Gymnadenia nigra group, which is polyploid and apomictic. At the time, all these taxa were in the genus Nigritella, but that was later subsumed into Gymnadenia. The specific epithet rhellicanus commemorates Johannes Rhellicanus, who made the earliest attributed description of the species in 1536. Rhellicanus himself called the plant Christimanus (Latin: Christi manus 'Christ's hand').
