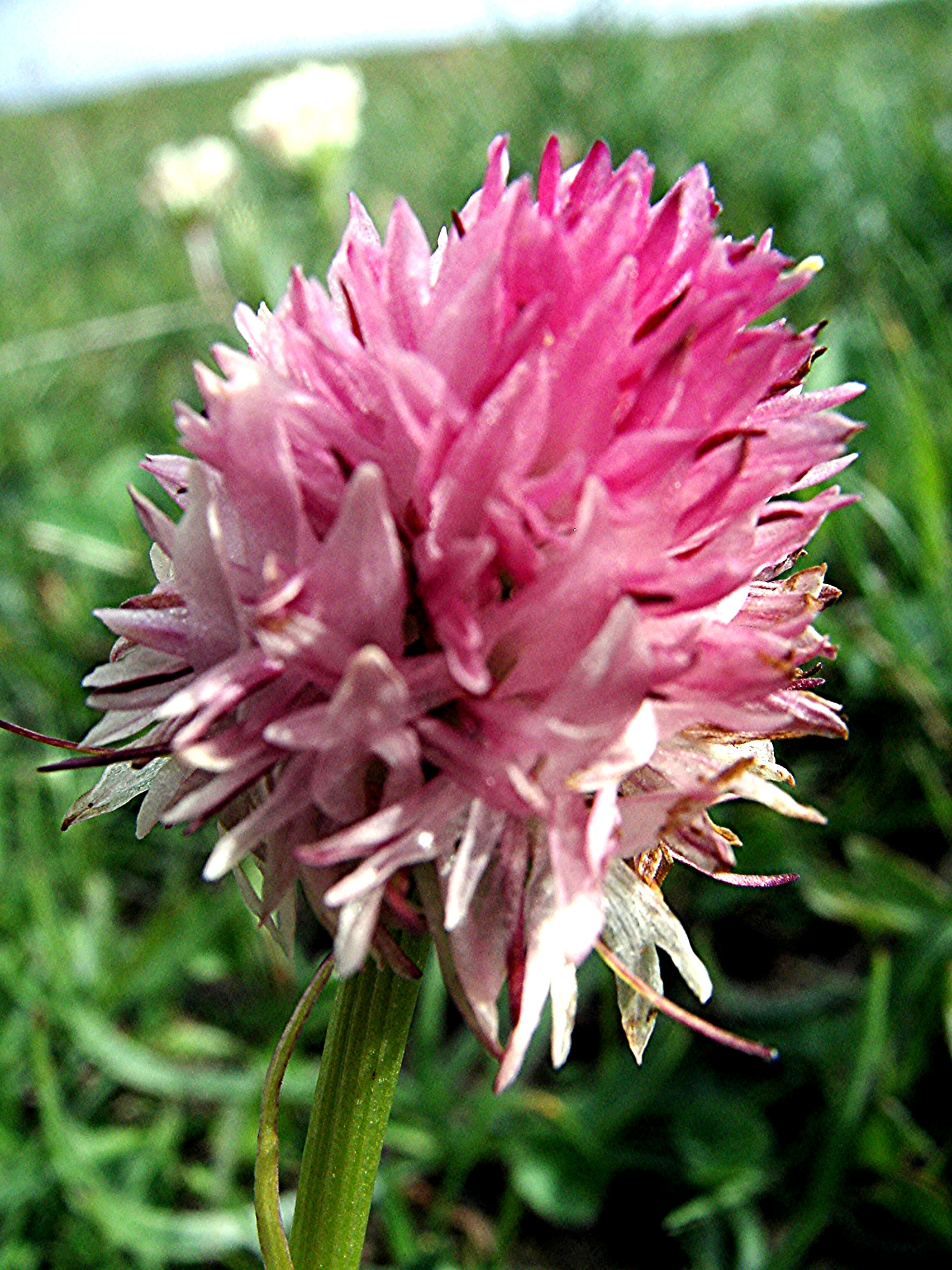

Scientific classification
- Kingdom: Plantae
- Clade: Tracheophytes
- Clade: Angiosperms
- Clade: Monocots
- Order: Asparagales
- Family: Orchidaceae
- Subfamily: Orchidoideae
- Genus: Gymnadenia
- Species: G. corneliana

Binomial name
- Gymnadenia corneliana (Beauverd) Teppner & E. Klein

Synonyms
- Nigritella nigra subsp. corneliana Beauverd (basionym); Nigritella lithopolitanica subsp. corneliana (Beauverd) Teppner & E. Klein; Nigritella corneliana (Beauverd) Gölz & H.R. Reinhard; Nigritella corneliana subsp. bourneriasii E. Breiner & R. Breiner; Nigritella corneliana var. bourneriasii (E. Breiner & R. Breiner) E. Klein; Gymnadenia corneliana var. vesubiana (G. Keller) G. Foelsche & W. Foelsche; Gymnadenia corneliana var. bourneriasii (E. Breiner & R. Breiner) Pellic.; Gymnadenia corneliana f. bourneriasii (E. Breiner & R. Breiner) P. Delforge; Gymnadenia corneliana f. vesubiana (G. Keller) P. Delforge

= Gymnadenia corneliana =

Species of orchid

Gymnadenia corneliana is a species of orchid with light-pink petals, found only in the Southwestern Alps in a small region near the France-Italy border. It was first catalogued by Swiss botanist Gustave Beauverd. Some specimens of this orchid display slightly darker petals, although this is uncommon. This flower, like many orchids in its genus, is said to emit a pleasant odor resembling that of vanilla.
