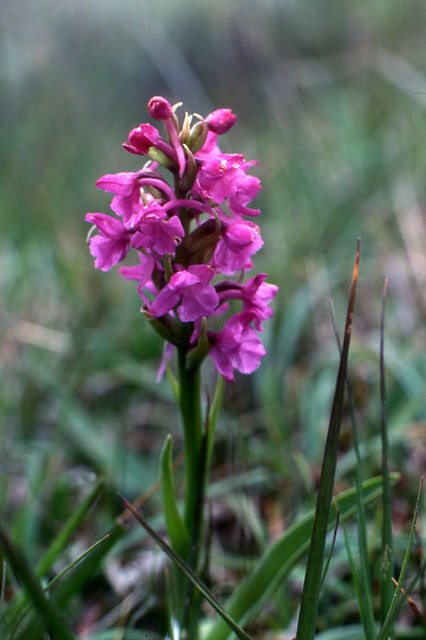

Scientific classification
- Kingdom: Plantae
- Clade: Tracheophytes
- Clade: Angiosperms
- Clade: Monocots
- Order: Asparagales
- Family: Orchidaceae
- Subfamily: Orchidoideae
- Genus: Gymnadenia
- Species: G. borealis

Binomial name
- Gymnadenia borealis (Druce) R.M.Bateman, Pridgeon & M.W.Chase, 1997

= Gymnadenia borealis =

Species of orchid

Gymnadenia borealis, the heath fragrant orchid, is a Palearctic orchid.

Gymnadenia borealis is found in North and Central Europe (Great Britain, Ireland and Germany). The species can be found up to 2,800 meters in altitude.
