= Gymnadenia crassinervis =

Conservation status
- Endangered (IUCN 3.1)

Scientific classification
- Kingdom: Plantae
- Clade: Tracheophytes
- Clade: Angiosperms
- Clade: Monocots
- Order: Asparagales
- Family: Orchidaceae
- Subfamily: Orchidoideae
- Genus: Gymnadenia
- Species: G. crassinervis

Binomial name
- Gymnadenia crassinervis Finet

Synonyms
- Gymnadenia crassinervis var. elatior Tang & F.T.Wang; Herminium chiwui Tang & F.T.Wang

Species of flowering plant

Gymnadenia crassinervis is a species of flowering plant in the family Orchidaceae. It is a tuberous geophyte native to Tibet, western Sichuan, and northwestern Yunnan in China.
