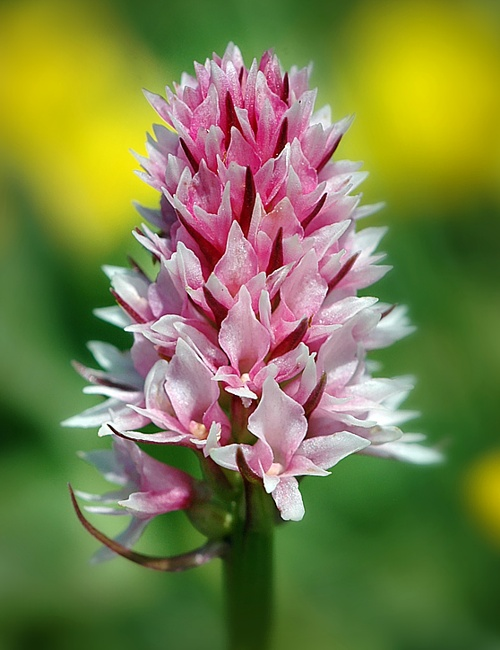

Conservation status
- Endangered (IUCN 3.1)

Scientific classification
- Kingdom: Plantae
- Clade: Tracheophytes
- Clade: Angiosperms
- Clade: Monocots
- Order: Asparagales
- Family: Orchidaceae
- Subfamily: Orchidoideae
- Genus: Gymnadenia
- Species: G. stiriaca

Binomial name
- Gymnadenia stiriaca (Rech.) Teppner & E. Klein, 1998

Synonyms
- Gymnadenia rubra var. stiriaca Rech.; Nigritella rubra subsp. stiriaca (Rech.) H.Baumann & R.Lorenz; Nigritella stiriaca (Rech.) Teppner & E.Klein

= Gymnadenia stiriaca =

Species of flowering plant

Gymandenia stiriaca, the Salzkammergut vanilla orchid, is a species of orchid endemic to Austria.

== Description ==
Gymandenia stiriaca are comparatively robust and many-flowered compared to other species in the Nigritella sub-genus. Their flowers are two-colored, each single flower is dark pink to dark pink-purple in the center and has a gradient towards the petal and sepal tips, with light pink, cream or white tips. Also unlike several other Nigritella species all flower rows of the inflorescence have the same color (with no vertical gradient). Depending on altitude they bloom from June to mid July.

== Distribution ==
As of 2007 only 15 populations of the species had been discovered within the Salzkammergut portion of the Austrian Alps, in the states of Styria, Salzburg and Upper Austria. Their elevation ranges from 1300m to 1800m.

== Taxonomy ==
Gymandenia stiriaca was first published in 1906 as Gymnadenia rubra var stiriaca by Lily and Karl Rechinger after they had discovered a plant on the Sarstein mountain in 1904. In 1985 Teppner&Klein moved it to the rank of full species under Nigritella stiriaca and then in 1998 back to the original genus as Gymnadenia stiriaca.
