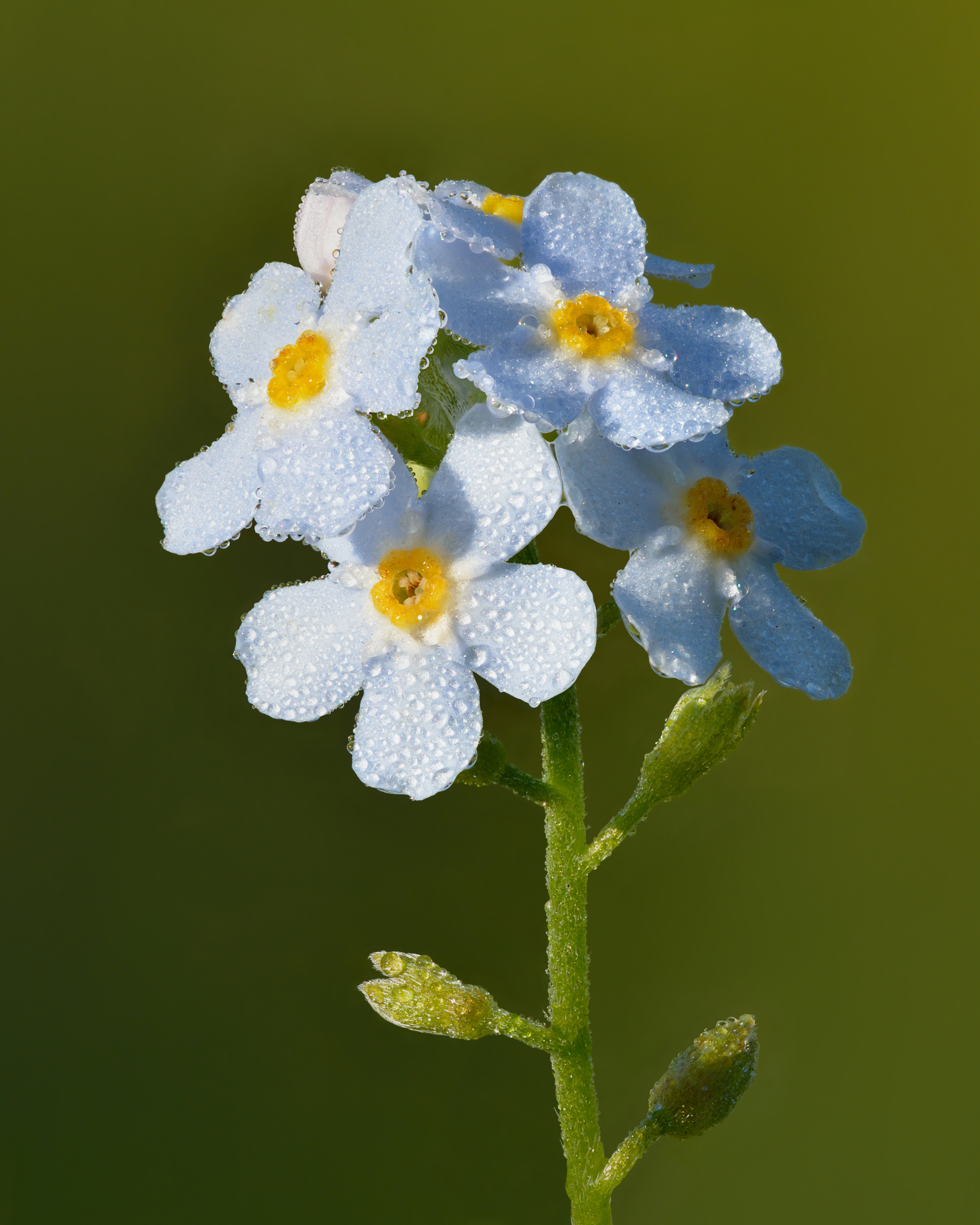

Conservation status
- Secure (NatureServe)

Scientific classification
- Kingdom: Plantae
- Clade: Tracheophytes
- Clade: Angiosperms
- Clade: Eudicots
- Clade: Asterids
- Order: Boraginales
- Family: Boraginaceae
- Genus: Myosotis
- Species: M. scorpioides

Binomial name
- Myosotis scorpioides L.

Synonyms
- List: Echioides palustris Moench; Echioides perennis Moench; Myosotis adpressa Stokes; Myosotis aspera Lamotte; Myosotis coronaria Dumort.; Myosotis dumortieri Thielens; Myosotis geniculata Schur; Myosotis laxiflora Rchb.; Myosotis multiflora Mérat; Myosotis oraria Dumort.; Myosotis palustris (L.) Hill; Myosotis palustris subsp. eupalustris Hyl.; Myosotis palustris var. subglabrata Polozhij; Myosotis perennis Moench; Myosotis scabra Simonk.; Myosotis scorpioides var. palustris L.; Myosotis scorpioides subsp. palustris (L.) F.Herm.; Myosotis scorpiurus Reichard; Myosotis serotina Hülph.; Myosotis strigulosa Rchb.; Scorpioides glaber Gilib.

= Myosotis scorpioides =

Species of flowering plant

Myosotis scorpioides (syn. Myosotis palustris), the true forget-me-not or water forget-me-not, is a forget-me-not plant species in the borage family, Boraginaceae.

== Distribution and habitat ==
This herbaceous perennial plant is native to Europe and Asia, but is widely distributed elsewhere, including much of North America, as an introduced species and sometimes a noxious weed. The plant is common and widespread in Britain, but is very rare in Jersey.

The plant is usually found in damp or wet habitats, such as bogs, ponds, streams, ditches, fen and rivers. Whilst it favours wet ground, it can survive submerged in water, and often can form floating rafts.

== Description ==
It is an erect to ascending plant of up to 70 cm (28 in), bearing small (8–12 mm) flowers pink in bud, becoming blue when fully open, with yellow centers and white honey guides. The plant is distinguished by its long style. The leaves are oblong to linear and pubescent on both sides. It blooms from mid-spring to first frost in temperate climates.

Myosotis scorpioides is also known as water scorpion grass due to the spiraling curve of its inflorescence in the form of a scorpioid cyme. Its corolla is tubular, nectar collected at the base is sucked by pollinating animals like insects and small birds.

== Historical and cultural impact ==
According to an old European legend, the flower got its name from an incident where a knight and his betrothed were walking along the water when they spotted the flowers. The lady expressed her wish to have one of the beautiful flowers and the knight went to carry out his beloved's wish. But as the knight reached for them, he fell into the water. He grasped at the flowers growing along the water's edge and as he drowned he called out "Forget me not!" The flower is the province flower of Dalsland since 1908.

== Gallery ==
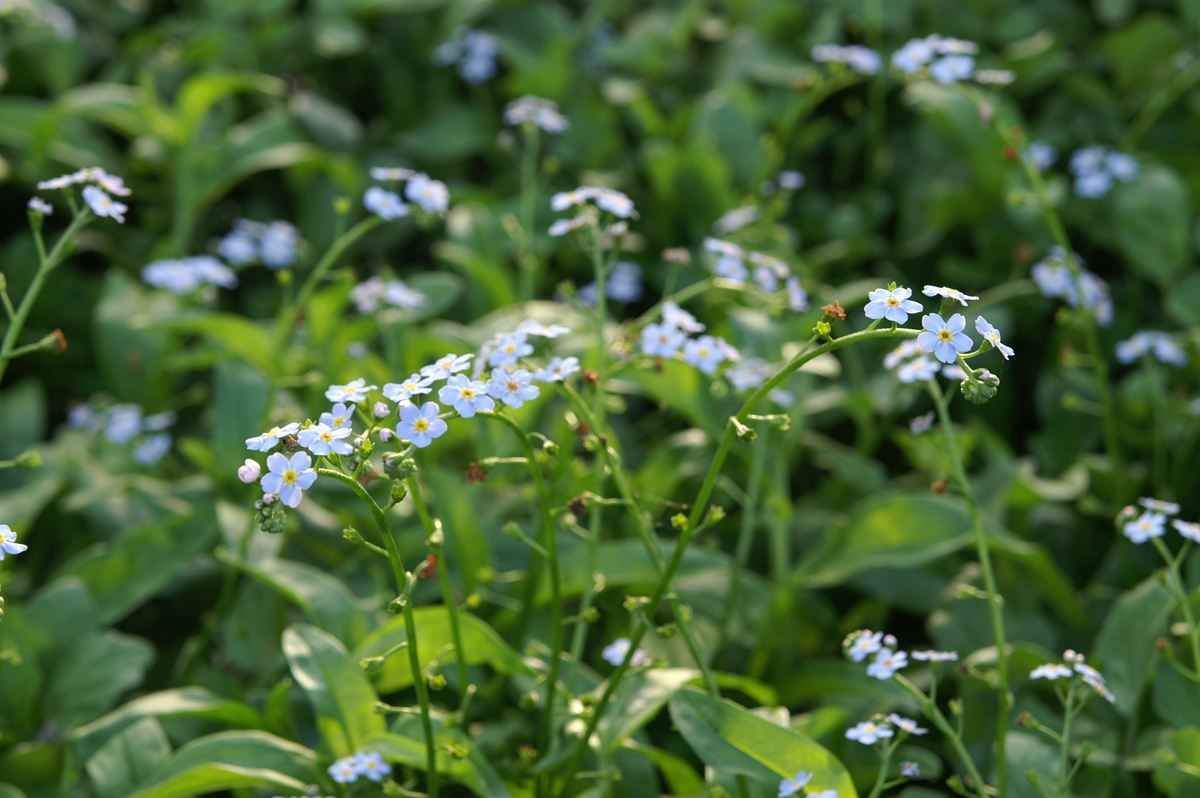
Whole plant

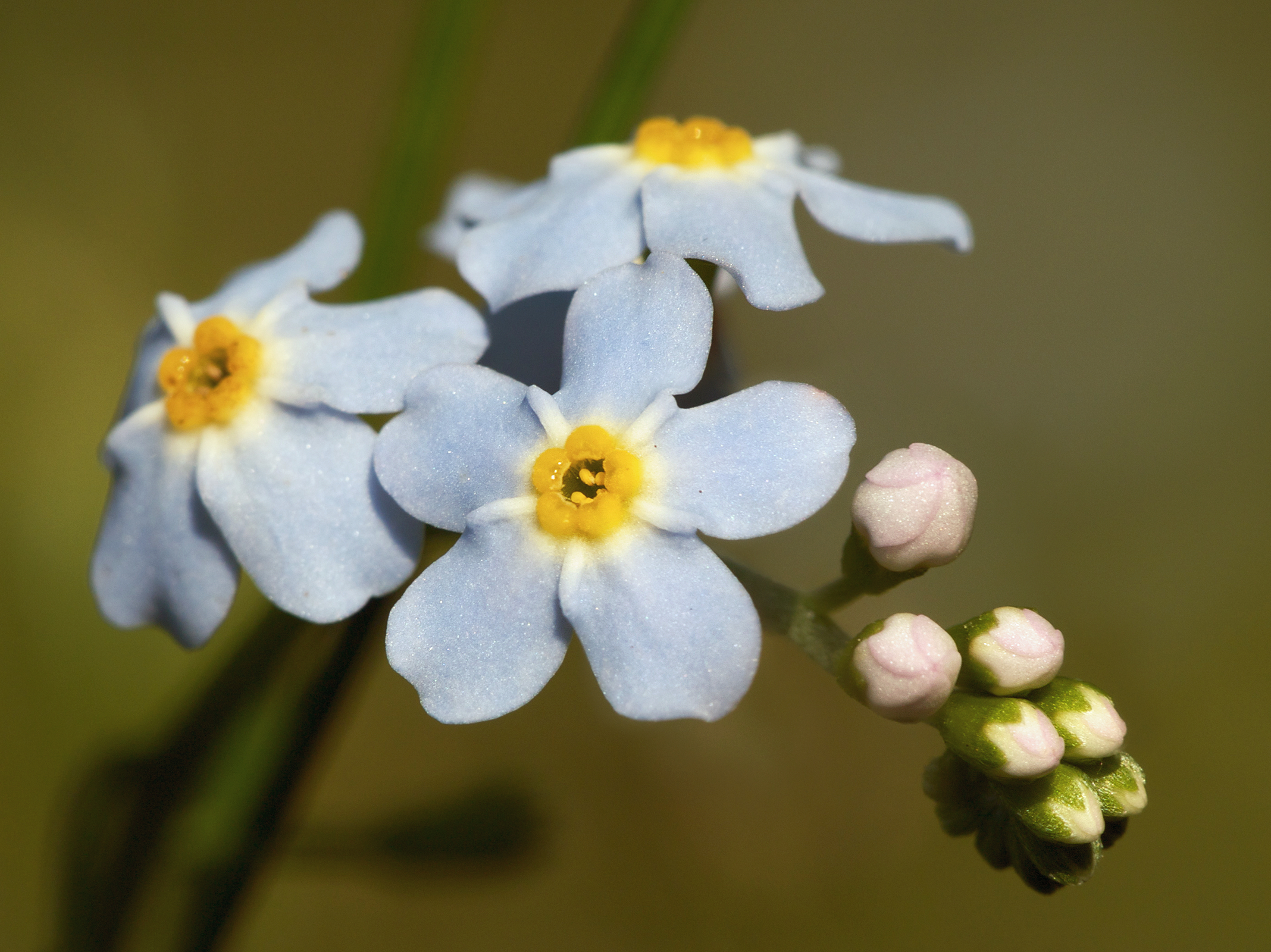
Flowers

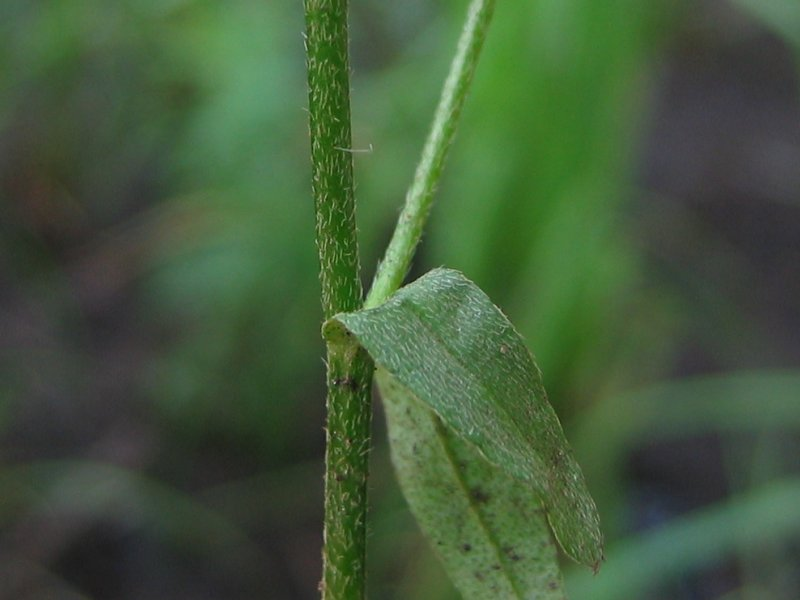
Leaves

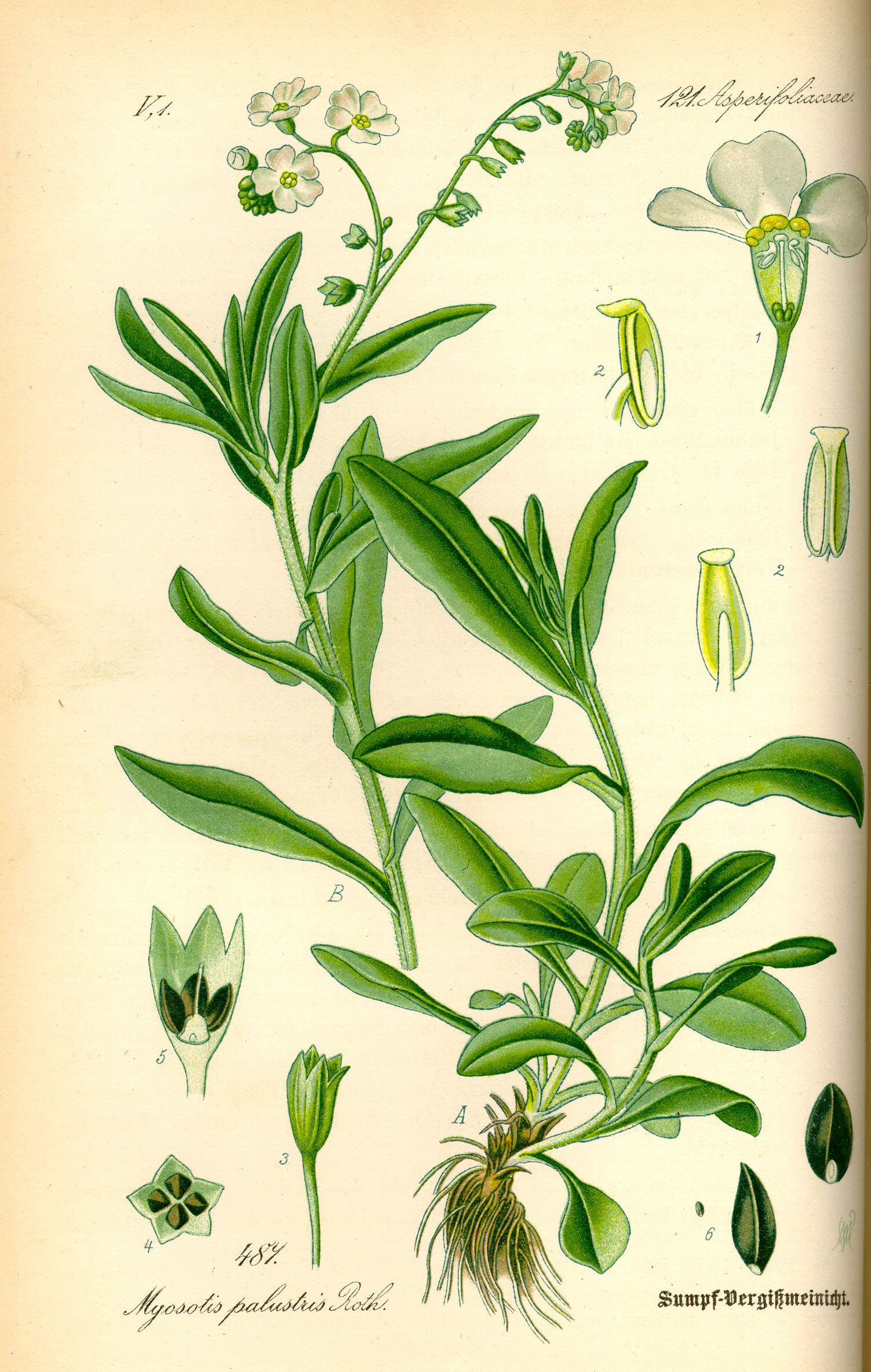
Plate 487 from Thomé's Flora von Deutschland, Österreich und der Schweiz (1885)

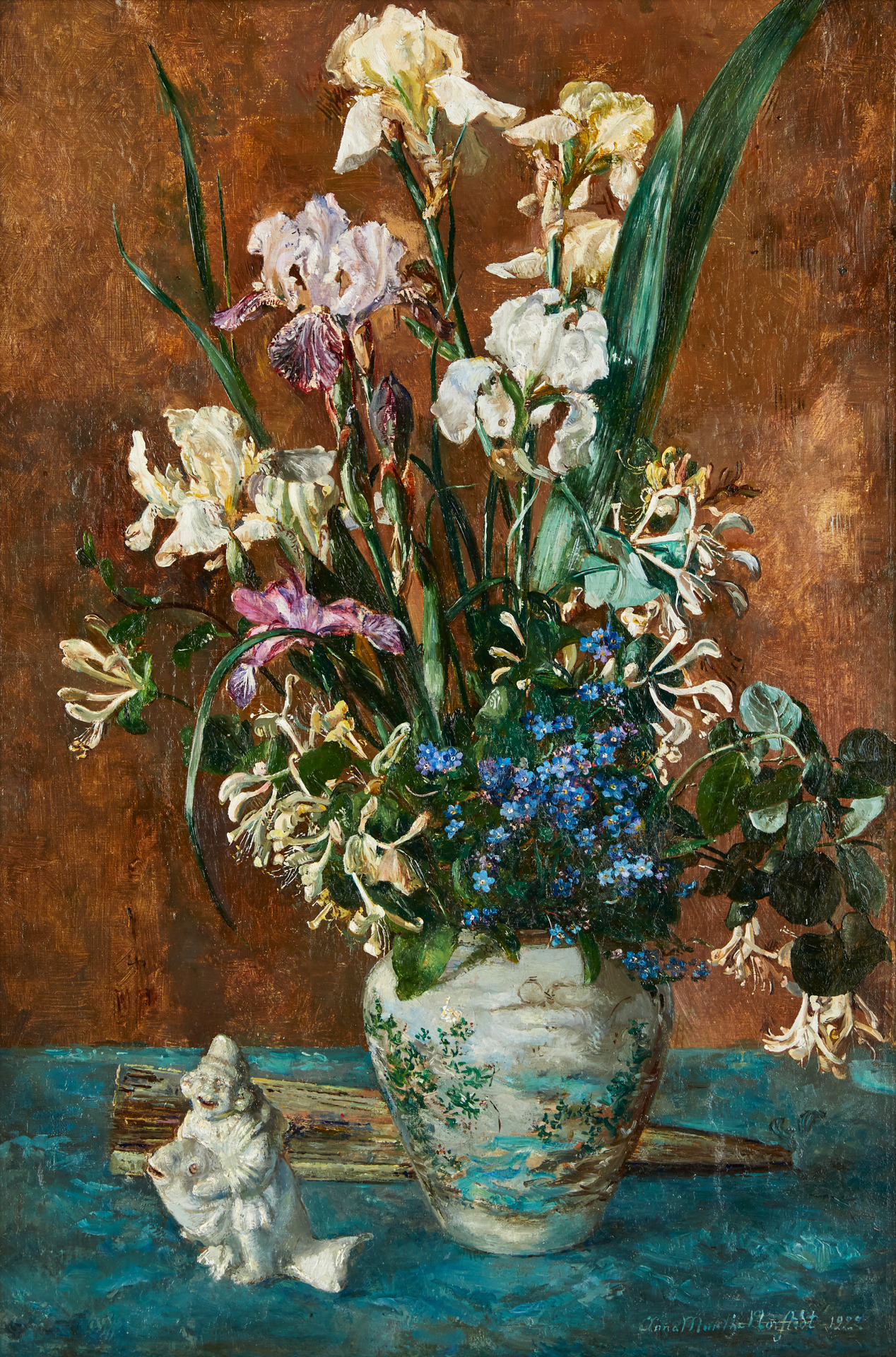
Anna Munthe-Norstedt, Still life with irises and forget-me-nots (1922)

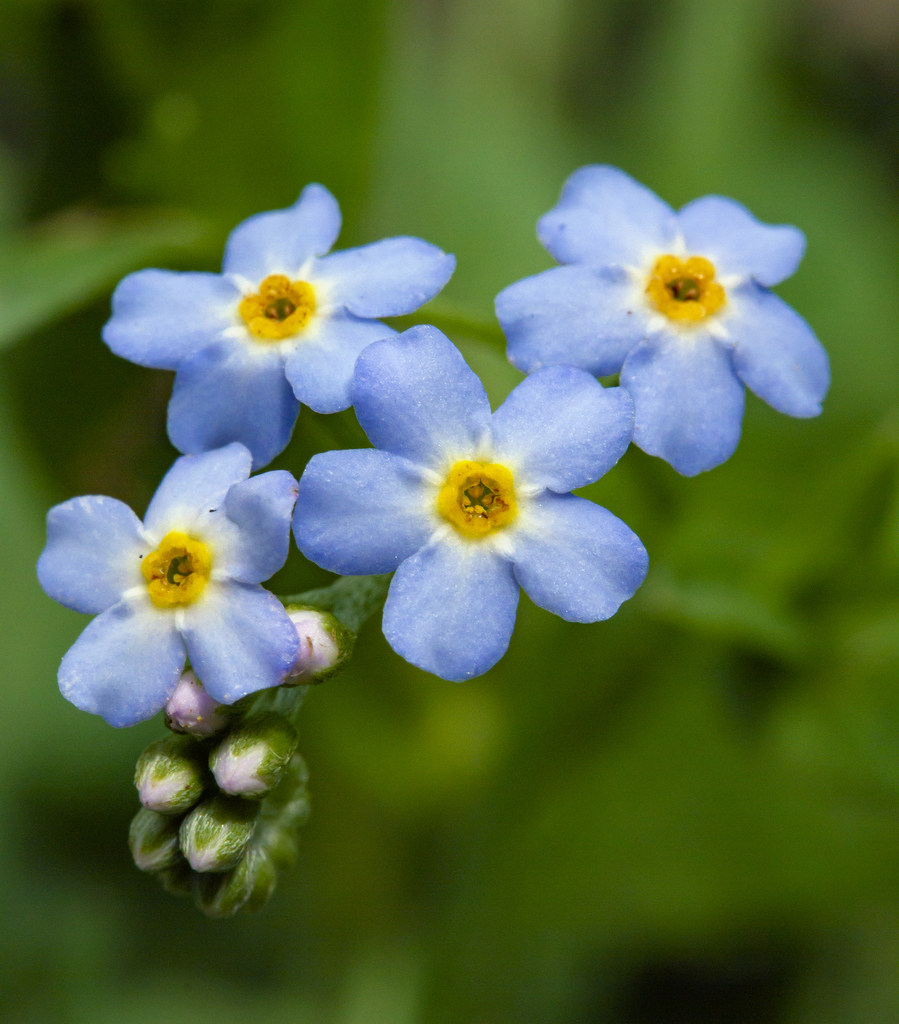
Water Forget-Me-Not (Myosotis scorpioides) in Pennsylvania

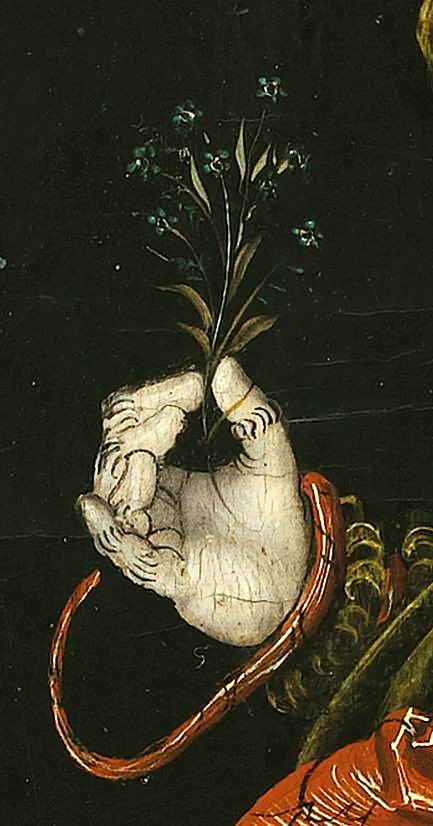
Detail from Cranach the Elder's Girl with forget-me-nots
