= Province flowers of Sweden =

Province flowers are species of plants selected to represent each province of Sweden. The origin of province flowers came from the American idea of state flowers, and was brought to Sweden by August Wickström and Paul Petter Waldenström in 1908. Waldenström published the proposal to introduce province flowers in the May 288, 1908 edition of the newspaper Stockholms Dagblad, and requested suggestions of species from the country's botanics. A list was put together on June 7, 1908, by professor Veit B. Wittrock from the Botanical Garden in Stockholm. Scania and Hälsingland violently opposed the plants that were selected to represent them; Scania was given European beech but wanted oxeye daisy, while Hälsingland was given Scots Pine but wanted flax. Erik E:son Hammar, a pastor and politician in Sweden, granted the two provinces' wish to change their province flowers in 1909. There is still debate amongst several other provinces over which species should represent them and they have therefore been given two province flowers.

== List ==
Province	Image	Local name	Scientific name
Blekinge	Quercus robur	Ek	Quercus robur
Blekinge	Verbascum thapsus	Kungsljus	Verbascum thapsus
Bohuslän	Lonicera periclymenum	Vildkaprifol	Lonicera periclymenum
Dalarna	Campanula rotundifolia	Blåklocka	Campanula rotundifolia
Dalarna	Campanula patula	Ängsklocka	Campanula patula
Dalsland	Myosotis scorpioides	Förgätmigej	Myosotis scorpioides
Gotland	Hedera helix	Murgröna	Hedera helix
Gästrikland	Convallaria majalis	Liljekonvalj	Convallaria majalis
Halland	Genista pilosa	Hårginst	Genista pilosa
Hälsingland	Linum usitatissimum	Lin	Linum usitatissimum
Härjedalen	Pulsatilla vernalis	Mosippa	Pulsatilla vernalis
Härjedalen	Viola biflora	Fjällviol	Viola biflora
Jämtland	Gymnadenia nigra	Brunkulla	Gymnadenia nigra
Lappland	Dryas octopetala	Fjällsippa	Dryas octopetala
Medelpad	Picea abies	Gran	Picea abies
Medelpad	Trollius europaeus	Smörboll	Trollius europaeus
Norrbotten	Rubus arcticus	Åkerbär	Rubus arcticus
Närke	Primula veris	Gullviva	Primula veris
Skåne	Leucanthemum vulgare	Prästkrage	Leucanthemum vulgare
Småland	Linnaea borealis	Linnea	Linnaea borealis
Södermanland	Nymphaea alba	Vit näckros	Nymphaea alba
Uppland	Fritillaria meleagris	Kungsängslilja	Fritillaria meleagris
Värmland	Trientalis europaea	Skogsstjärna	Trientalis europaea
Västerbotten	Pedicularis sceptrum-carolinum	Kung Karls spira	Pedicularis sceptrum-carolinum
Västergötland	Calluna vulgaris	Ljung	Calluna vulgaris
Västmanland	Viscum album	Mistel	Viscum album
Ångermanland	Viola tricolor	Styvmorsviol	Viola tricolor
Öland	Helianthemum oelandicum	Ölandssolvända	Helianthemum oelandicum
Östergötland	Centaurea cyanus	Blåklint	Centaurea cyanus
