= Johannes Rhellicanus =

Protestant scholar in Switzerland, botanist c. 1478-1542

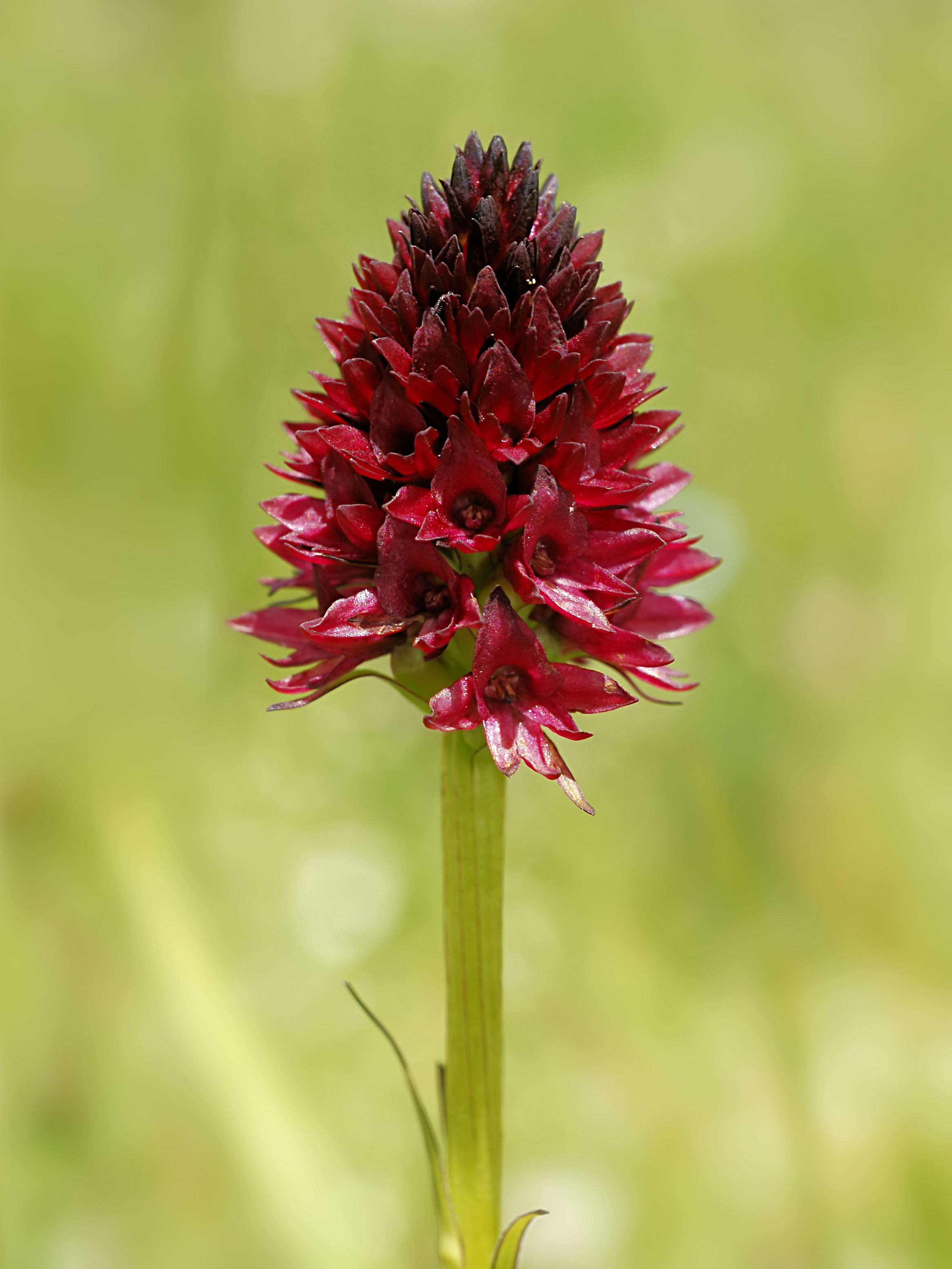
- Gymnadenia rhellicani, named for Rhellicanus
- Born: 1478 or 1488; Rellikon, Swiss Confederation
- Died: 1542
- Education: University of Kraków, University of Wittenberg
- Occupations: University lecturer, translator, pastor, botanist

Johannes Müller (Latin: Johannes Rellicanus, also Rellikan or Rellikon, c. 1478–1488 – 14 January 1542) was a Swiss clergyman and theologian of the Reformation in Switzerland, philologist and philosopher, noted for his work in early modern botany.

Rhellicanus first came to prominence as an apt pupil, and then teacher, of Latin, Greek, and Hebrew. He studied at the Jagellonian University in Kraków (1517–1522), and then at the University of Wittenberg (1522–1525).

In 1525, Rhellicanus became a teacher at St. George's Abbey, Stein am Rhein, near Zurich, where he taught Heinrich Bullinger during the latter's five-month stay in 1527 in Zürich to study languages and attend the Prophezei; both were followers of Huldrych Zwingli.

Rhellicanus was next appointed Professor of Greek and Philosophy at the new High School of Bern.On account of the Bern Debate of 1538, he returned to Zurich, where he was a teacher at the Latin school at Fraumünster. Later, in 1541 he became a pastor in Biel.

Rhellicanus became a botanist in 1536 while visiting the Stockhorn mountain and immersing himself in nature there; he later a didactic poem about the trip, entitled Stockhornias, written in hexameter. In this, he made the earliest known description of the dark vanilla orchid, which was later named Gymnadenia rhellicani in his honor. Rhellicanus himself called the plant Christimanus (Latin: Christi manus, "Christ's hand").

Other works of Rhellicanus include an encomium of Johannes Oecolampadius composed in Greek, and a translation into Latin from the Greek of the De Homero (On Homer) of Pseudo-Plutarch, which he entitles Homeri Vita, Ex Plutarcho ("The Life of Homer, From Plutarch")
