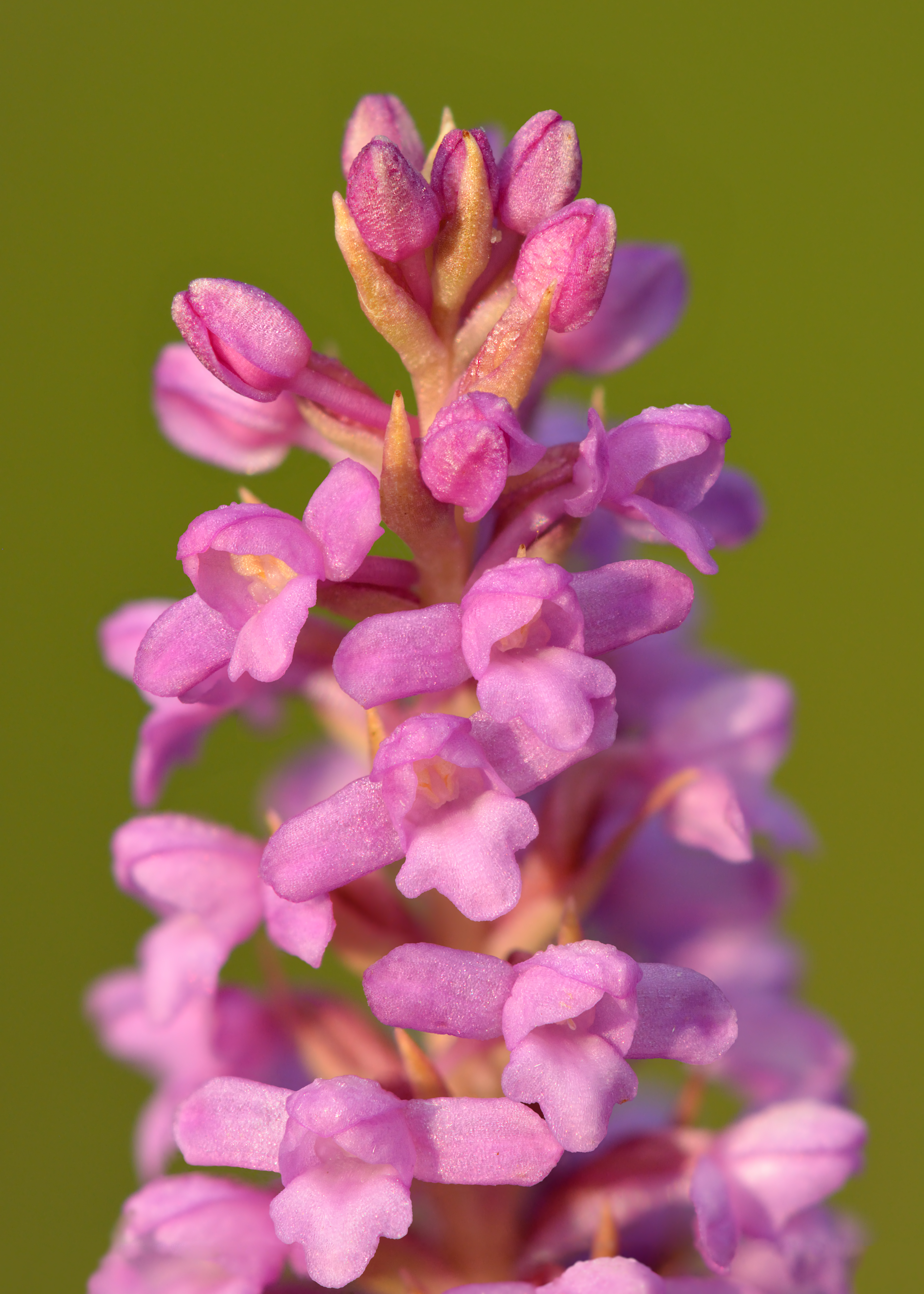

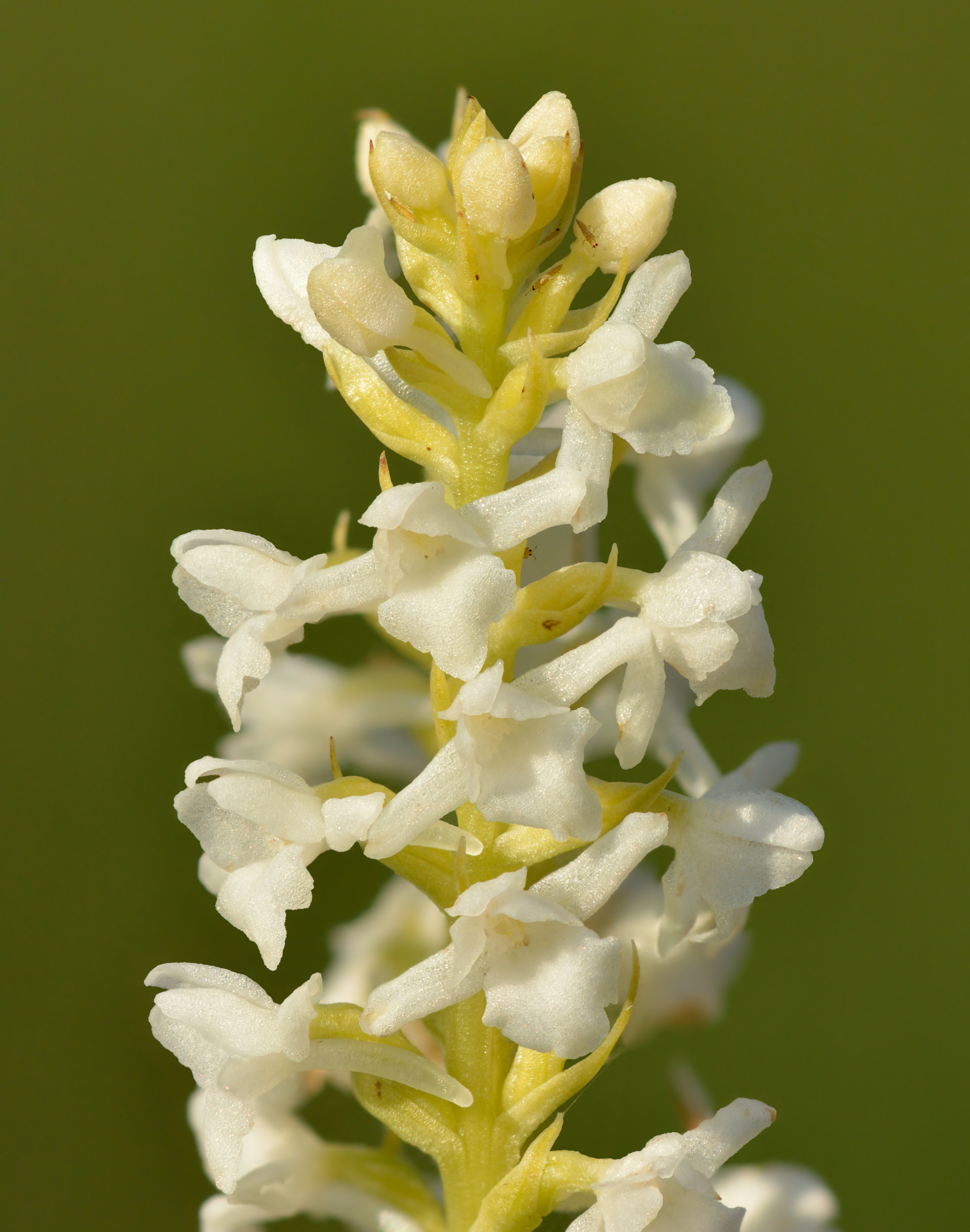

Scientific classification
- Kingdom: Plantae
- Clade: Tracheophytes
- Clade: Angiosperms
- Clade: Monocots
- Order: Asparagales
- Family: Orchidaceae
- Subfamily: Orchidoideae
- Genus: Gymnadenia
- Species: G. odoratissima

Binomial name
- Gymnadenia odoratissima (L.) Rich.

Synonyms
- Orchis odoratissima L. (basionym); Satyrium odoratissimum (L.) Wahlenb.; Habenaria odoratissima (L.) Franch.

= Gymnadenia odoratissima =

Short Spurred Fragrant Orchid

Species of orchid

Gymnadenia odoratissima, the short spurred fragrant orchid, is a species of orchid. It is in the genus Gymnadenia.

== Distribution ==
The short spurred fragrant orchid is native to Europe, it can be found as far west as Spain and as far east as Romania. It can also be found in Sweden.
