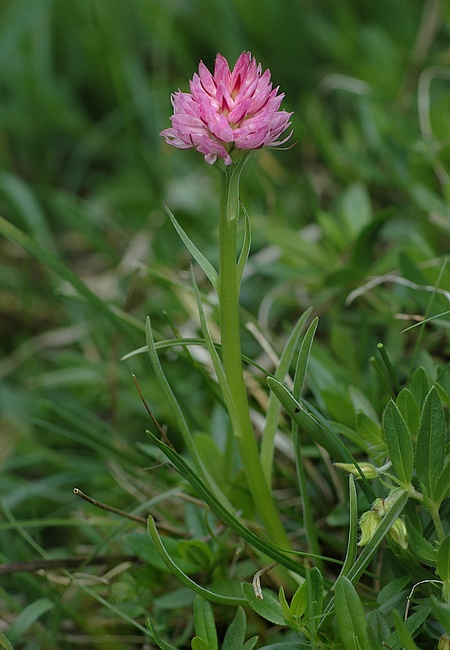

Conservation status
- Endangered (IUCN 3.1)

Scientific classification
- Kingdom: Plantae
- Clade: Tracheophytes
- Clade: Angiosperms
- Clade: Monocots
- Order: Asparagales
- Family: Orchidaceae
- Subfamily: Orchidoideae
- Genus: Gymnadenia
- Species: G. archiducis-joannis

Binomial name
- Gymnadenia archiducis-joannis Teppner & E.Klein, 1998

= Gymnadenia archiducis-joannis =

Species of flowering plant

Nigritella archiducis-joannis (German: Erzherzog-Johann-Kohlröschen) is a species of orchid endemic to a few locations in Totes Gebirge, the Dachstein, the Karawanken, the Koralpe – that is the Austrian states Styria, Upper Austria, Salzburg und Carinthia – as well as Triglav National Park.

== Description ==
The inflorescence is spherical. The flowers are light to dark pink. The lip, lateral petals and the middle sepal extend straight forward, not angled. The lip is 8mm long and 2-4mm from the base has a saddle-shaped constriction. The lateral sepals are slightly wider than the petals. The spur is 1.4mm long. Reproduction is asexual.

They bloom in July and August.

== Distribution ==
This species was first described as endemic to the Northern Limestone Alps in Totes Gebirge. 1996 it was also discovered at several locations in the Dachstein Mountains (Salzburg), 2006 on the Hochobir (Karawanks, Carinthia) and the Styrian Kor Alps and 2008 in Triglav National Park in Slovenia. It grows on sub-alpine chalk heath at elevations between 1800m and 2000m.
