= Gymnadenia bicornis =

Conservation status
- Endangered (IUCN 3.1)

Scientific classification
- Kingdom: Plantae
- Clade: Tracheophytes
- Clade: Angiosperms
- Clade: Monocots
- Order: Asparagales
- Family: Orchidaceae
- Subfamily: Orchidoideae
- Genus: Gymnadenia
- Species: G. bicornis

Binomial name
- Gymnadenia bicornis Tang & K.Y.Lang

Species of flowering plant

Gymnadenia bicornis is a species of flowering plant in the family Orchidaceae. It is a tuberous geophyte endemic to Tibet.

== Appearance ==
G. bicornis reaches heights of 50-70 cm. It has ellipsoid tubers that measure 3-5 cm in length. The plant features a thick stem, which has 2 or 3 tubular sheaths at the base and 6-8 cauline leaves. The leaves are very spaced apart and can be elliptical, narrowly elliptical, or lanceolate, measuring 9-13 x 2-4 cm, with an acuminate apex. The inflorescence is elongated, measuring 25 cm; the peduncle has 2 lanceolate bract that can reach up to 5 cm; the rachis is 8-11.5 cm long and is densely populated with many flowers. The floral bracts are ovate-lanceolate to lanceolate, with an acuminate apex. The flowers themselves are relatively small and are a pale yellowish-green color.

== Distribution ==
The plant is native to eastern and southeastern Tibet.
