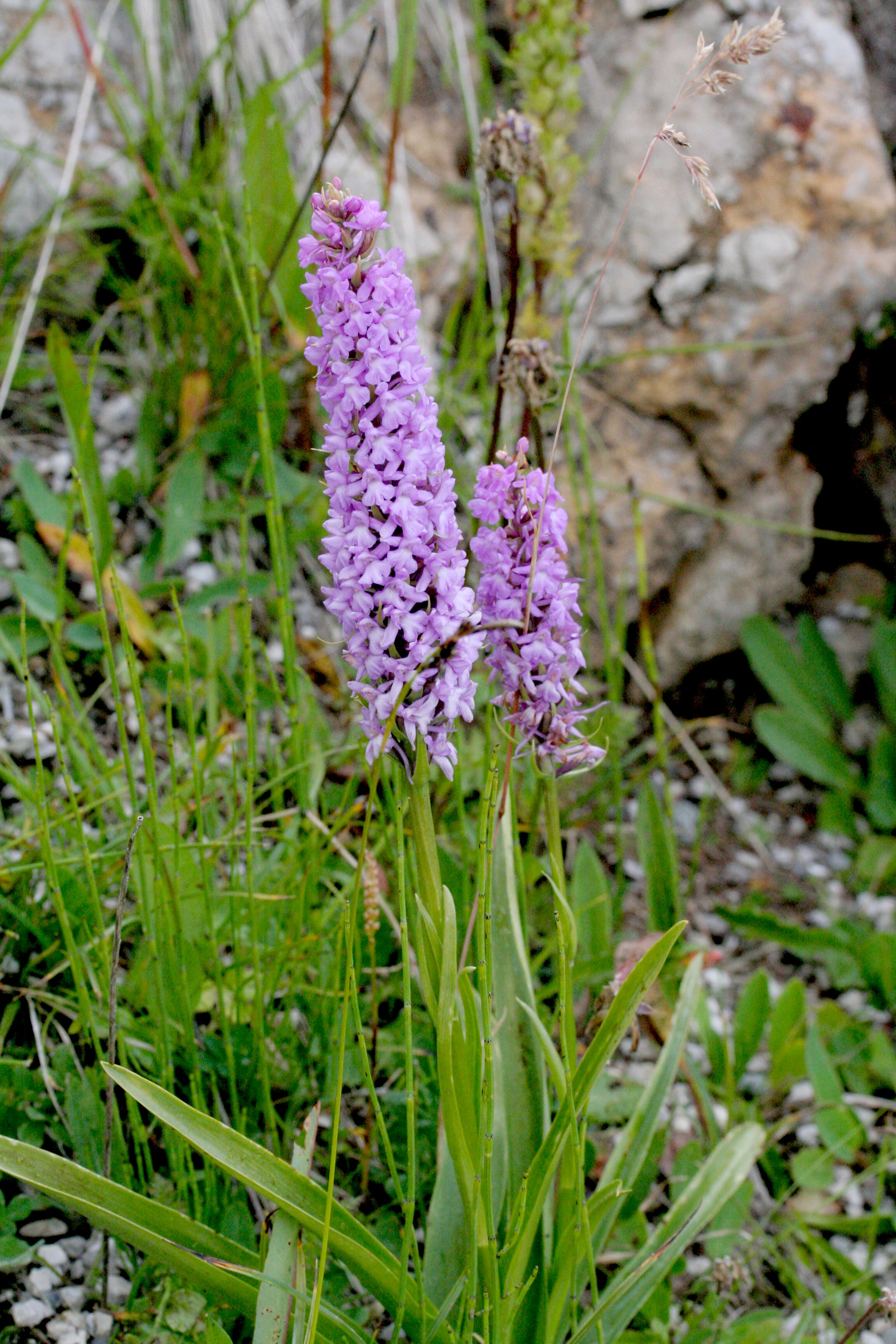
- Gymnadenia densiflora

Scientific classification
- Kingdom: Plantae
- Clade: Embryophytes
- Clade: Tracheophytes
- Clade: Angiosperms
- Clade: Monocots
- Order: Asparagales
- Family: Orchidaceae
- Subfamily: Orchidoideae
- Tribe: Orchideae
- Subtribe: Orchidinae
- Genus: Gymnadenia; R.Br.

Synonyms
- Nigritella Rich.; × Gymnigritella E.G.Camus

= Gymnadenia =

Genus of flowering plants in the orchid family

Gymnadenia is a genus of flowering plants in the orchid family (Orchidaceae) containing 22 terrestrial species. The former genus Nigritella is now included in Gymnadenia.

They can be found in damp meadows, fens and marshes, and on chalk or limestone, often in alpine regions of Europe and Asia from Portugal to Kamchatka, including China, Japan, Mongolia, Siberia, the Himalayas, Iran, Ukraine, Germany, Scandinavia, Great Britain, etc. The fragrant orchid (Gymnadenia conopsea) has been introduced into the US and is reportedly naturalized in Connecticut.

These hardy terrestrial orchids are deciduous. They survive the winter through two deep-cut tubers. Long lanceolate green leaves grow at the bottom of the stem. There are some small leaves at the stop of the stem.

They flower during the summer. The inflorescence is a dense cylindrical spike between 5 and 30 cm (2.0 and 11.8 in) long. It can consists of up to 150 small pleasant-smelling flowers. It is recently discovered that eugenol and isoeugenol, floral volatile scent compounds, are catalyzed by single type of enzyme in Gymnadenia species and gene encoding for this enzyme is first functionally characterized gene in this species so far. Their color can vary from pale purple to pink and white. The lip is wide with three lobes. The marginal petals are horizontal. There is a long, thin, threadlike spur.

Several species were formerly classified under Nigritella. The nothogeneric name ×Gymnigritella was used for hybrids between these two groups.

== Species ==
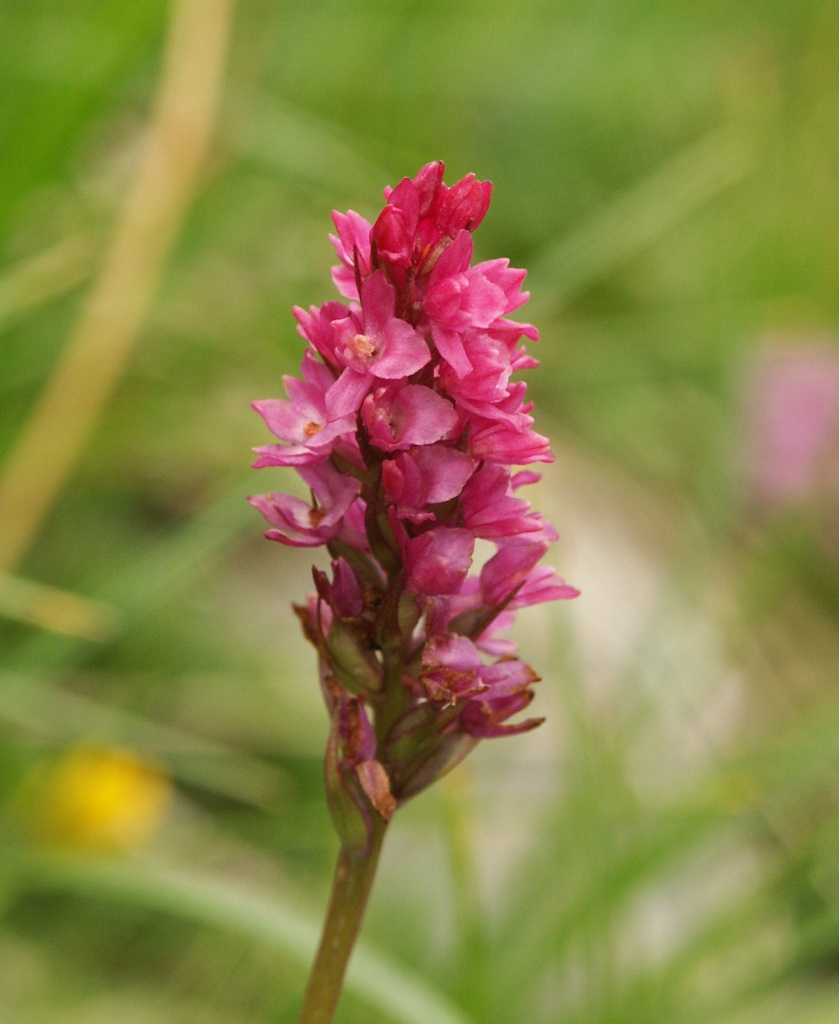
Gymnadenia × heufleri

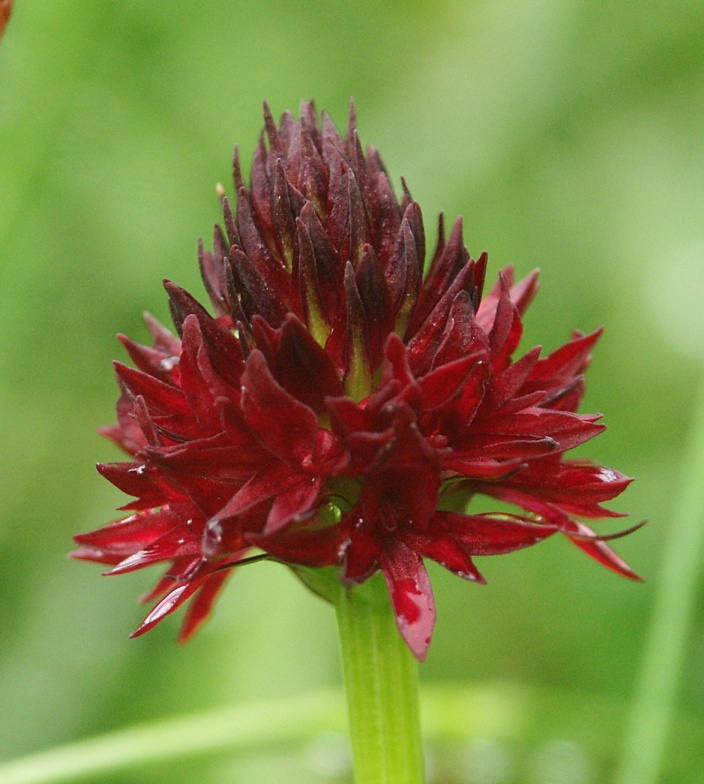
Gymnadenia rhellicani (syn. Nigritella rhellicani)

As of August 2023, Plants of the World Online accepted the following species and hybrids. ([N] = formerly placed in Nigritella, [GN] = formerly placed in ×Gymnigritella.)

- Gymnadenia archiducis-joannis (Teppner & E.Klein) Teppner & E.Klein [N] – Austria
- Gymnadenia austriaca (Teppner & E.Klein) P.Delforge [N] – C. Europe to Pyrenees
- Gymnadenia bicolor (W.Foelsche) W.Foelsche & O.Gerbaud
- Gymnadenia bicornis Tang & K.Y.Lang – Tibet
- Gymnadenia borealis (Druce) R.M.Bateman, Pridgeon & M.W.Chase
- Gymnadenia buschmanniae (Teppner & Ster) Teppner & E.Klein [N] – Italy
- Gymnadenia carpatica (Zapal.) Teppner & E.Klein [N] – E. Carpathians
- Gymnadenia conopsea (L.) R.Br. – fragrant orchid, Europe to Temp. E. Asia
- Gymnadenia corneliana (Beauverd) Teppner & E.Klein – SW. Alps
- Gymnadenia crassinervis Finet – China
- Gymnadenia densiflora (Wahlenb.) A.Dietr.
- Gymnadenia dolomitensis Teppner & E.Klein [N] – S. Alps
- Gymnadenia emeiensis K.Y.Lang – China (Sichuan)
- Gymnadenia frivaldii Hampe ex Griseb. – Balkan Pen. to S. Carpathians
- Gymnadenia gabasiana (Teppner & E.Klein) Teppner & E.Klein [N] – Pyrenees
- Gymnadenia lithopolitanica (Ravnik) Teppner & E.Klein [N] – SE. Alps
- Gymnadenia miniata (Crantz) Hayek
- Gymnadenia minor (W.Foelsche & Zernig) W.Foelsche, Zernig & O.Gerbaud
- Gymnadenia nigra (L.) Rchb.f. [N] – Europe, Israel
- Gymnadenia odoratissima (L.) Rich. – Europe
- Gymnadenia orchidis Lindl. – Himalaya to China
- Gymnadenia rhellicani (Teppner & E.Klein) Teppner & E.Klein [N] – W. Alps
- Gymnadenia stiriaca (Rech.) Teppner & E.Klein
- Gymnadenia taquetii Schltr. – Korea
- Gymnadenia widderi (Teppner & E.Klein) Teppner & E.Klein [N] – NE. Alps, C. Italy

=== Hybrids ===
- Gymnadenia × abelii (Asch. & Graebn.) J.M.H.Shaw
- Gymnadenia × borisii Stoj., Stef. & T.Georgiev
- Gymnadenia × chanousiana G.Foelsche & W.Foelsche (G. rhellicani × G. conopsea) [GN] – France
- Gymnadenia × delphineae (M.Gerbaud & O.Gerbaud) M.Gerbaud & O.Gerbaud (G. corneliana × G. rhellicani) GN) – France
- Gymnadenia × eggeriana O.Gerbaud (G. austriaca var. gallica × G. rhellicani) [N] – France
- Gymnadenia × fohringeri (Griebl) J.M.H.Shaw
- Gymnadenia × geigelsteiniana (B.Baumann & H.Baumann) J.M.H.Shaw
- Gymnadenia × godferyana (G.Keller) W.Foelsche (G. conopsea × G. rubra) [GN] – Alps
- Gymnadenia × hedrenii (W.Foelsche) J.M.H.Shaw
- Gymnadenia × heufleri (A.Kern.) Wettst. – Alps
- Gymnadenia × hubertii (Griebl) J.M.H.Shaw
- Gymnadenia × intermedia Peterm. – Europe
- Gymnadenia × kaeseri (Braun-Blanq.) Oddone
- Gymnadenia × moritziana (Brügger ex Nyman) Oddone
- Gymnadenia × petzenensis (F.Fohringer & Redl) Oddone
- Gymnadenia × pyrenaeensis W.Foelsche [GN] – Pyrenees
- Gymnadenia × runei (Teppner & E.Klein) Ericsson – Sweden
- Gymnadenia × ritzbergeri (Lachmair) Eccarius
- Gymnadenia × schwerei (G.Keller) J.M.H.Shaw
- Gymnadenia × suaveolens (Vill.) Rchb.f.
- Gymnadenia × teppneri (W.Foelsche) Oddone
- Gymnadenia × trummeriana (W.Foelsche) J.M.H.Shaw
- Gymnadenia × truongiae (Demares) W.Foelsche (G. conopsea × G. corneliana) [GN] – France
- Gymnadenia × turnowskyi (W.Foelsche) W.Foelsche (G. conopsea × G. lithopolitanica) [GN] – Austria
- Gymnadenia × wettsteiniana O.Abel [N] – Alps
- Gymnadenia × wucherpfennigiana (W.Foelsche) Eccarius

== In literature ==
Gymnadenia is the title of a novel published in 1929 in Norwegian by Nobel Prize winning author Sigrid Undset. The novel was translated into English by Arthur G. Chater and published in 1931 as The Wild Orchid.
