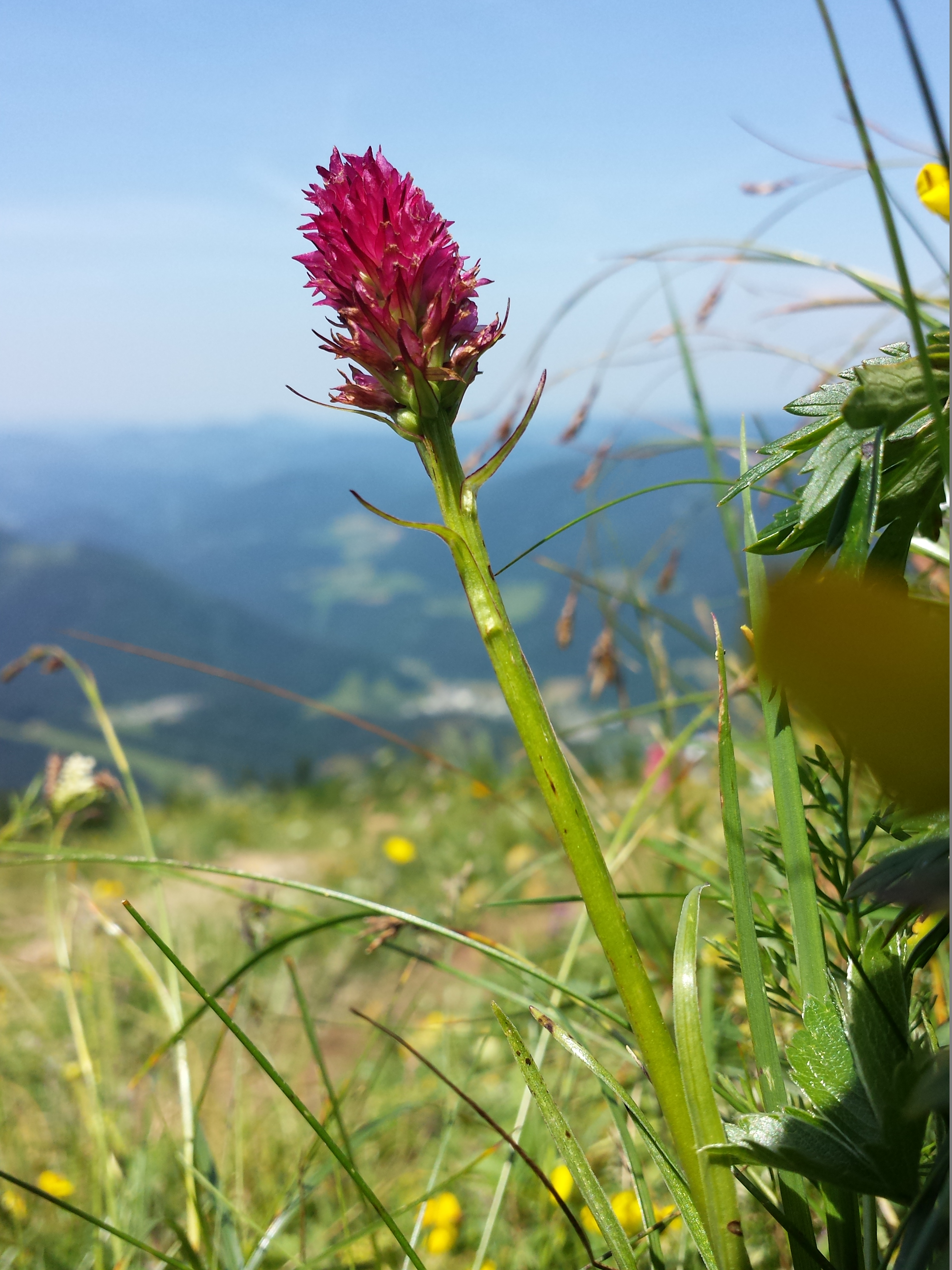

Scientific classification
- Kingdom: Plantae
- Clade: Embryophytes
- Clade: Tracheophytes
- Clade: Spermatophytes
- Clade: Angiosperms
- Clade: Monocots
- Order: Asparagales
- Family: Orchidaceae
- Subfamily: Orchidoideae
- Genus: Gymnadenia
- Species: G. miniata

Binomial name
- Gymnadenia miniata (Crantz) Hayek

Synonyms
- Synonymy: Gymnadenia miniata f. minor (W.Foelsche & Zernig) P.Delforge; Gymnadenia miniata f. rosea (C.Boillat & V.Boillat) P.Delforge; Gymnadenia nigra subsp. rubra (Richter) H.Sund.; Gymnadenia nigra var. rubra (Wettst.) Kraenzl.; Gymnadenia rubra Wettst.; Gymnadenia rubra f. minor (W.Foelsche & Zernig) P.Delforge; Gymnadenia rubra f. rosea (C.Boillat & V.Boillat) P.Delforge; Nigritella miniata (Crantz) Janch.; Nigritella minor W.Foelsche & Zernig; Nigritella nigra subsp. rubra (Wettst.) Beauverd; Nigritella nigra var. rubra (Wettst.) W.D.J.Koch; Nigritella rubra (Wettst.) K.Richt.; Nigritella rubra f. carpatica Soó; Nigritella rubra f. rosea C.Boillat & V.Boillat; Nigritella rubra f. wettsteinii Soó; Nigritella rubra subsp. dolomitensis (Teppner & E.Klein) Kreutz; Nigritella rubra var. minor (W.Foelsche & Zernig) H.Kretzschmar; Orchis miniata Crantz

= Gymnadenia miniata =

Species of flowering plant

Gymnadenia miniata is a species of orchid native to the Eastern Alps and Carpathian Mountains. It is similar in appearance to Gymnadenia bicolor; both species were split from a former less defined taxon Nigritella rubra which referred to all red flowering Gymnadenia.

== Description ==
Gymnadenia miniata are 10–20 cm high with about 6 grass-like leaves at the base, about 5 smaller leaves along the stem, and 3–4 bract-like leaves at the top. The inflorescence is cone or egg shaped, 18–26 mm long and 15–18 mm wide. The flowers are red (carmine to ruby) and all flowers have the same color. Buds are darker than the flowers. Bloom time is end of June to mid July.

To distinguish G. miniata from the very similar and more common G. bicolor, the flower color alone can be tricky. While G. miniata flowers always have a uniform and darker color and G. bicolor often has a gradient of colors from light at the bottom to dark at the top, G. bicolor can also be uniformly colored. It can be helpful to take measurements of average petal, sepal and spur lengths – G. miniata has a noticeably thinner lip and thinner side sepals and a shorter spur, but wider petals. Another difference is the orientation of the sepals which are unfolded in G. bicolor which makes especially the bottom sepal very noticeable – while in G. miniata all sepals are at a more forward angle and less noticeable.

== Taxonomy ==
The first use of the species epithet miniata for plants that are very likely the same species as today's Gymnadenia miniata was in 1769 by Heinrich Johann Nepomuk von Crantz who called red flowers he found Orchis miniata. Wettstein published red Gymnadenias as G. rubra in 1889, which became the standard taxon name long used to refer to them. When August von Hayek split the species (in a manuscript published posthumously in 1956), he again used miniata for the flowers first described by Crantz but many authors kept using G. rubra. In 2011 the International Association for Plant Taxonomy confirmed G. miniata as the current name with G. rubra as a synonym for it.
