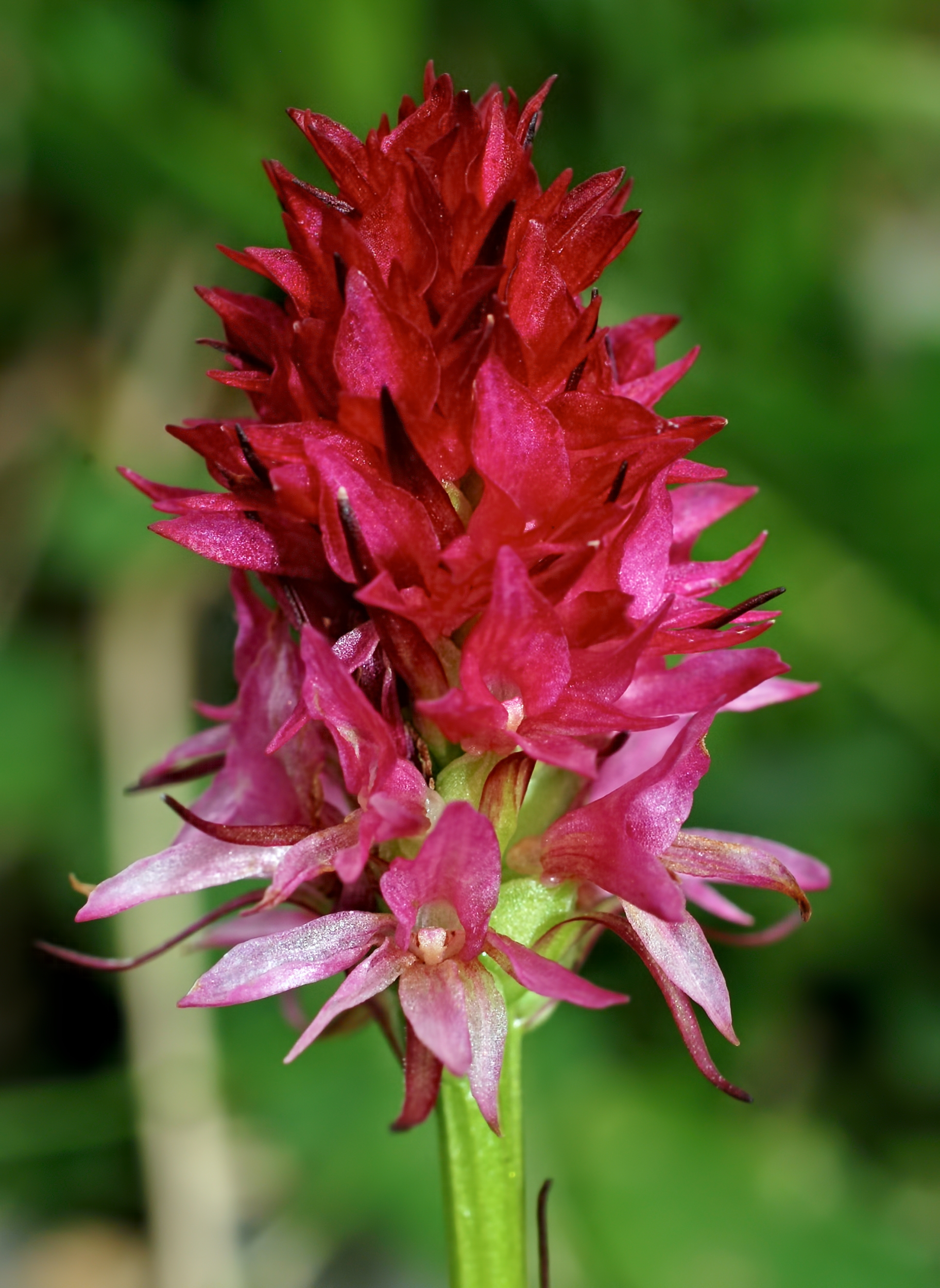

Scientific classification
- Kingdom: Plantae
- Clade: Embryophytes
- Clade: Tracheophytes
- Clade: Spermatophytes
- Clade: Angiosperms
- Clade: Monocots
- Order: Asparagales
- Family: Orchidaceae
- Subfamily: Orchidoideae
- Genus: Gymnadenia
- Species: G. bicolor

Binomial name
- Gymnadenia bicolor (W.Foelsche) W.Foelsche & O.Gerbaud, 2011

Synonyms
- Nigritella bicolor W.Foelsche

= Gymnadenia bicolor =

Species of flowering plant

Gymnadenia bicolor is a species of orchid occurring in the Eastern Alps, the Dinaric Alps and the Carpathian Mountains. It is very similar to Gymnadenia miniata (sometimes called Gymnadenia rubra) and often seen as a variation and not a separate species.

== Description ==
Gymandenia bicolor looks very similar to Gymnadenia miniata but is differentiated by usually having brighter flowers at the base and sepals that are wider than the petals. The middle sepal (at the bottom) is usually bent downwards and very noticeable. The lip (at the top) is less curled than with miniata.

== Taxonomy ==
Plants now considered Gymnadenia bicolor were originally placed into Gymnadenia rubra by Wettstein in 1889. Foelsche split it into a separate species Nigritella bicolor in 2010 and Foelsche&Gerbaud moved it to genus Gymnadenia in 2011.
