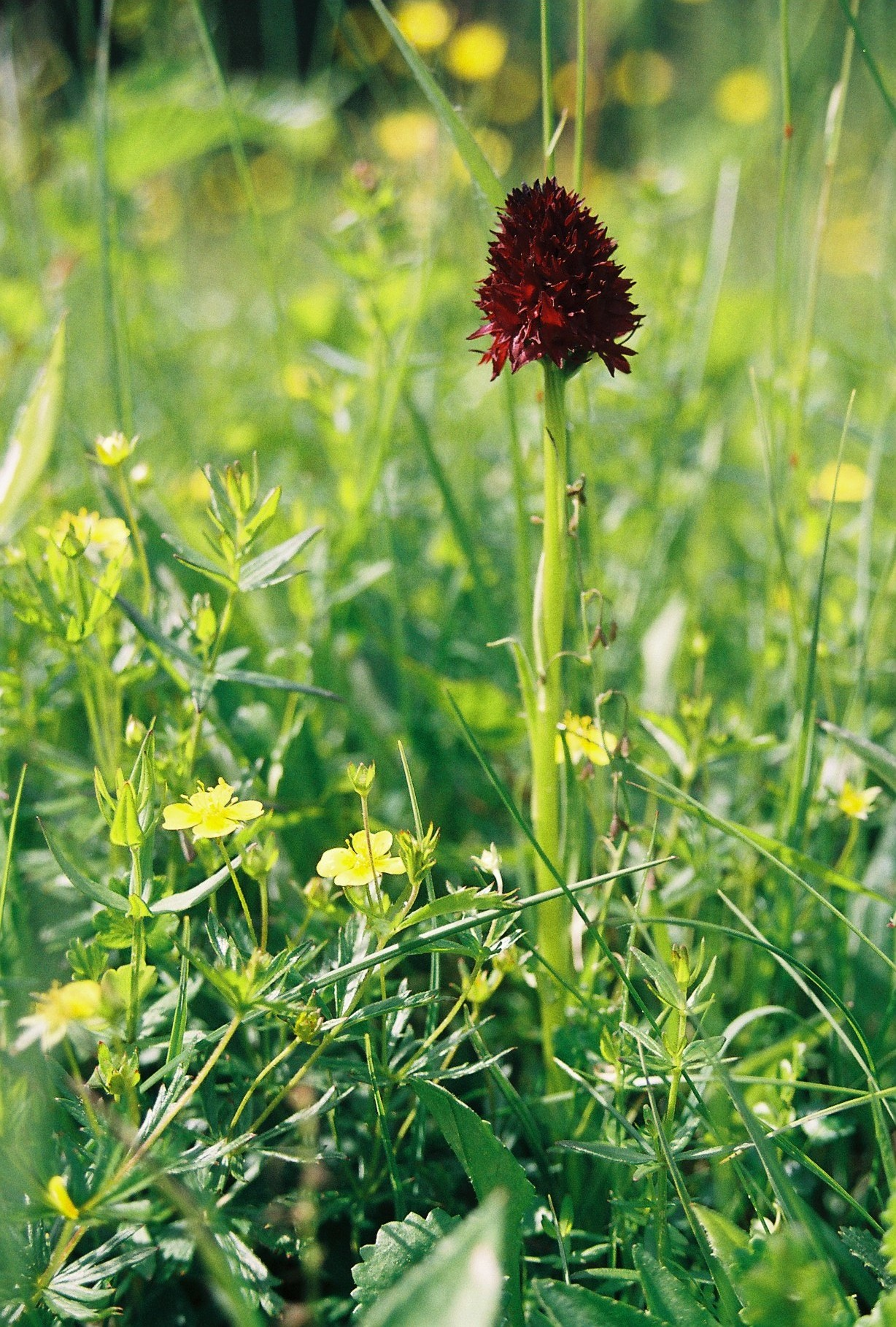

Scientific classification
- Kingdom: Plantae
- Clade: Tracheophytes
- Clade: Angiosperms
- Clade: Monocots
- Order: Asparagales
- Family: Orchidaceae
- Subfamily: Orchidoideae
- Genus: Gymnadenia
- Species: G. nigra

Binomial name
- Gymnadenia nigra (L.) Rchb.f.

Synonyms
- Nigritella nigra

= Gymnadenia nigra =

Species of orchid

Gymnadenia nigra, also known as the black vanilla orchid, is a species of orchid and the provincial flower of Jämtland, a historical province of Sweden. It is a perennial species found in the major mountain ranges of Europe, including the Pyrenees and the Alps, into the Balkans and central Scandinavia, though its population has declined in the past decades due to over-harvesting. In some countries, including Italy, it is listed as an endangered species. It has a maximum height of 25 cm.

== See also ==
- Province flowers of Sweden
