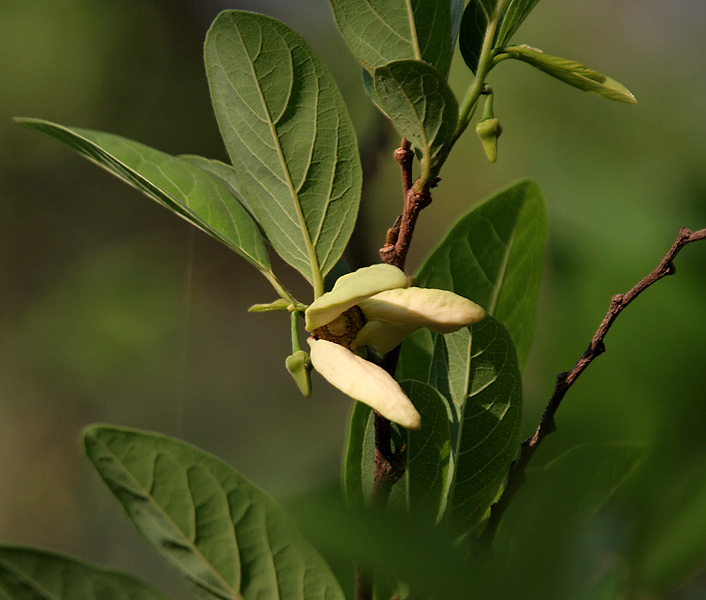
- Annona squamosa flower

Scientific classification
- Kingdom: Plantae
- Clade: Tracheophytes
- Clade: Angiosperms
- Clade: Magnoliids
- Order: Magnoliales
- Family: Annonaceae
- Subfamily: Annonoideae; Rafinesque, 1815

= Annonoideae =

Subfamily of plants

Annonoideae is a subfamily of plants in the family Annonaceae, with genera distributed in tropical areas world-wide. The family and this subfamily are based on the type genus Annona.

== Tribes and genera ==
The following genera, subdivided into seven tribes are accepted:

=== Annoneae ===
Auth.: Endlicher 1839

- Annona L. (synonym Rollinia A. St.-Hil.)
- Anonidium Engl. & Diels
- Asimina Adans. (synonym Deeringothamnus Small)
- Diclinanona Diels
- Disepalum Hook. f.
- Goniothalamus (Blume) Hook.f. & Thomson (synonym Richella A.Gray)
- Neostenanthera Exell (synonym Boutiquea Le Thomas)

=== Bocageeae ===
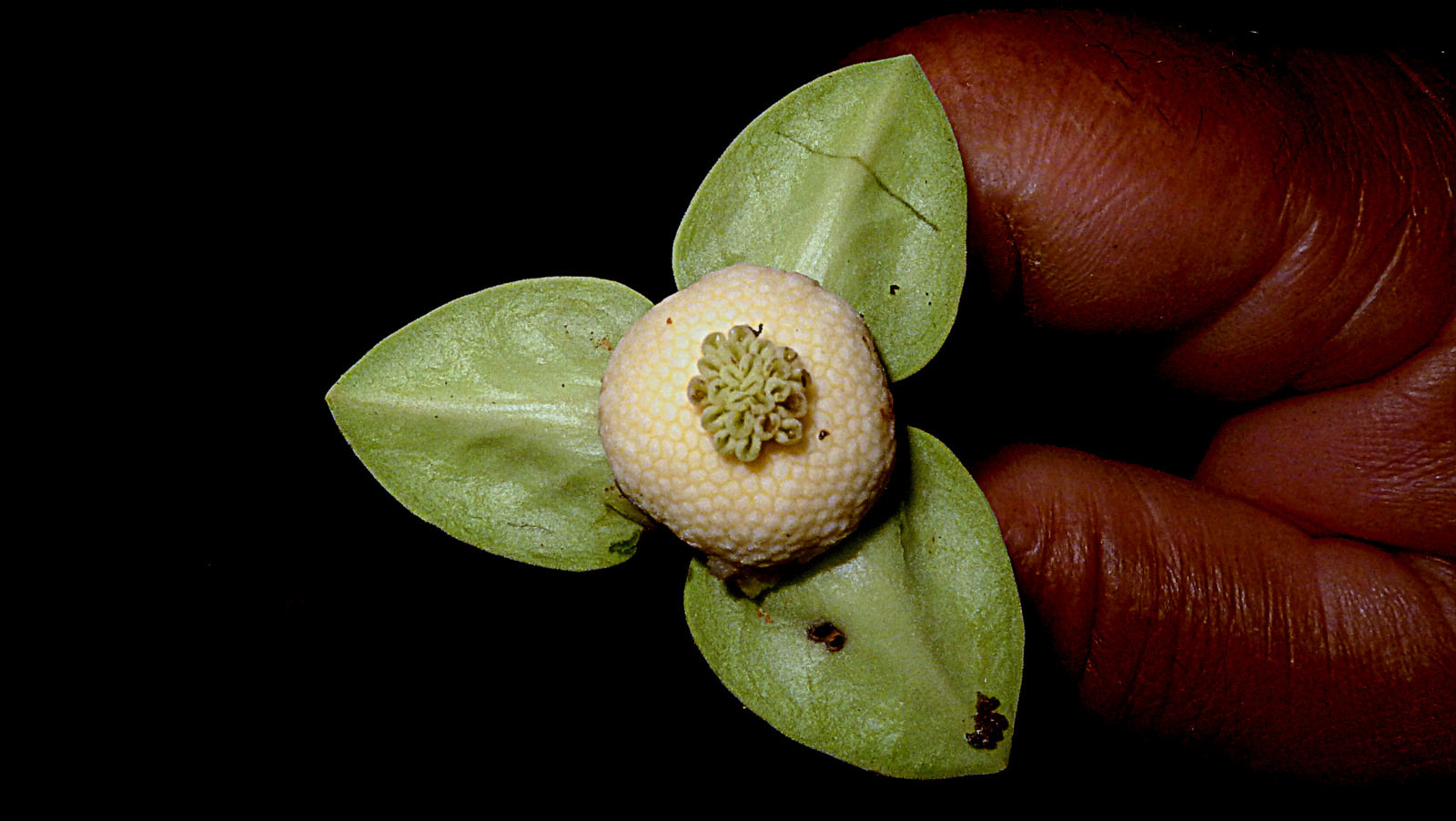
Cymbopetalum brasiliense

Auth.: Endlicher 1839

- Bocagea A.St.-Hil.
- Cardiopetalum Schltdl.
- Cymbopetalum Benth.
- Froesiodendron R.E.Fr.
- Hornschuchia Nees
- Mkilua Verdc.
- Porcelia Ruiz & Pav.
- Trigynaea Schltdl.

=== Duguetieae ===
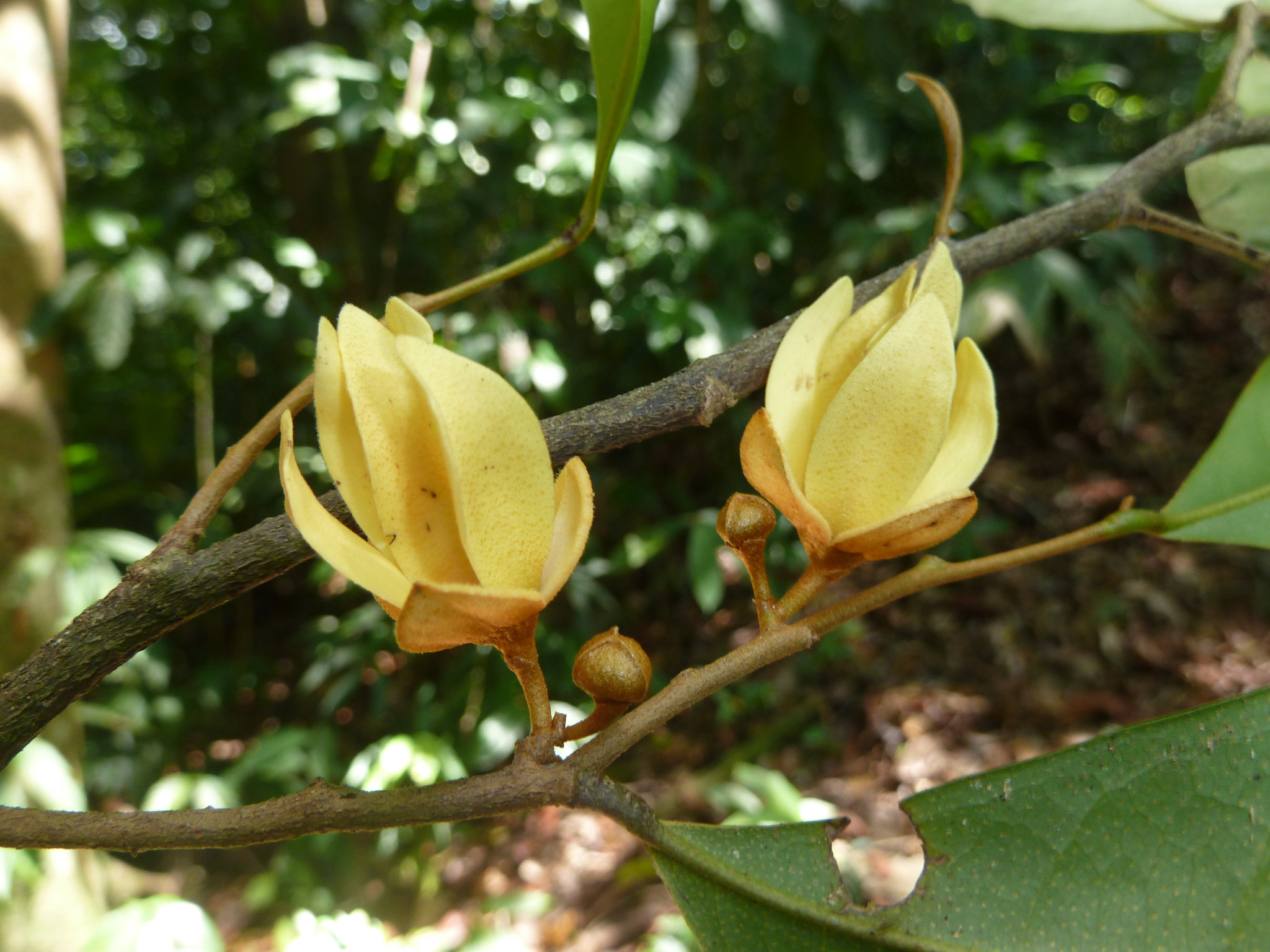
Duguetia confusa

Auth.: Chatrou & Saunders 2012

- Duckeanthus R.E.Fr.
- Duguetia A.St.-Hil.
- Fusaea (Baill.) Saff.
- Letestudoxa Pellegr.
- Pseudartabotrys Pellegr.

=== Guatterieae ===
Auth.: Hooker & Thomson 1855

- Guatteria Ruiz & Pav.

=== Monodoreae ===
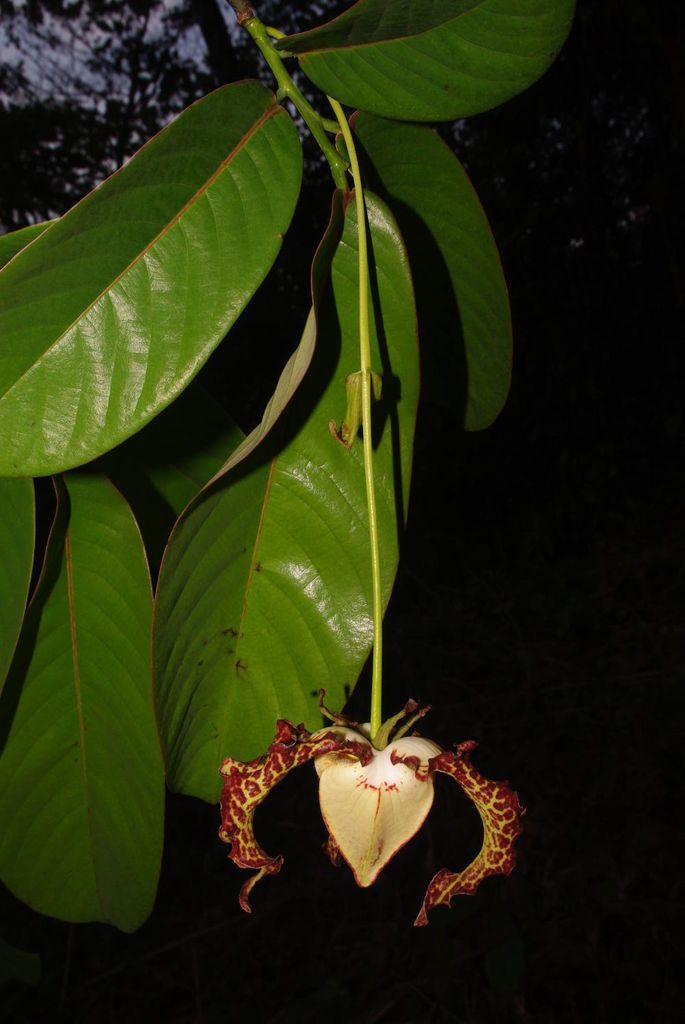
Monodora myristica

Auth.: Baill. 1868

- Asteranthe Engl. & Diels
- Dennettia Baker f.
- Hexalobus A.DC.
- Isolona Engl.
- Lukea Cheek & Gosline
- Mischogyne Exell
- Monocyclanthus Keay
- Monodora Dunal
- Uvariastrum Engl.
- Uvariodendron (Engl. & Diels) R.E.Fr.
- Uvariopsis Engl.

=== Ophrypetaleae ===
Auth.: Dagallier & Couvreur 2023

- Ophrypetalum Diels
- Sanrafaelia Verdc.

=== Uvarieae ===
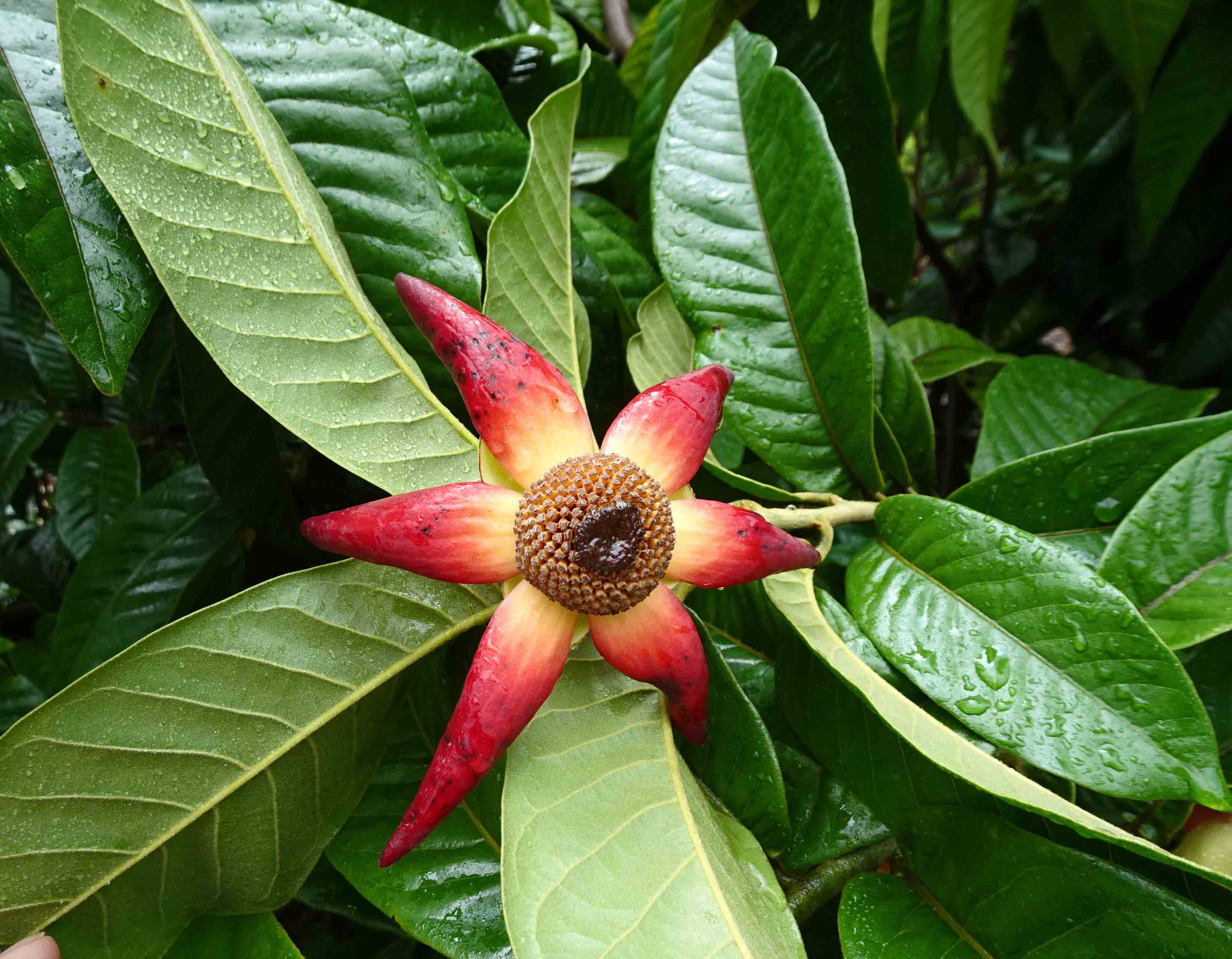
Uvaria grandiflora

Auth.: Hooker & Thomson 1855

- Afroguatteria Boutique
- Cleistochlamys Oliv.
- Dasymaschalon (Hook.f. & Thomson) Dalla Torre & Harms
- Desmos Lour.
- Dielsiothamnus R.E.Fr.
- Fissistigma Griff.
- Friesodielsia Steenis (syn. Schefferomitra Diels)
- Monanthotaxis Baill.
- Pyramidanthe Miq. (syn. Mitrella Miq.)
- Sphaerocoryne (Boerl.) Ridl.
- Toussaintia Boutique
- Uvaria L. (synonym Balonga Le Thomas and Melodorum Lour.)

=== Xylopieae ===
Auth.: Endlicher 1839

- Artabotrys R.Br.
- Xylopia L.
