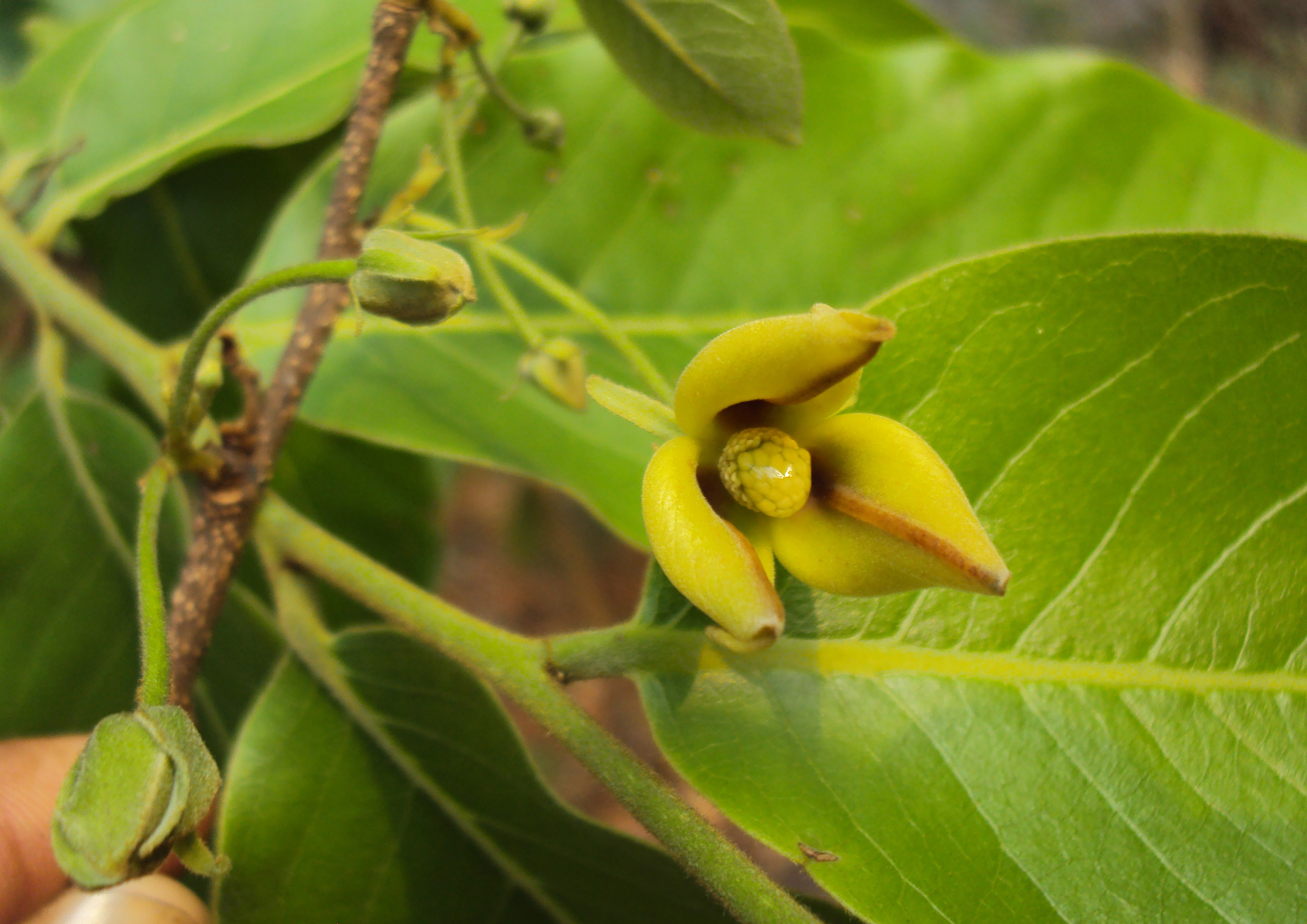
- Miliusa tomentosa

Scientific classification
- Kingdom: Plantae
- Clade: Tracheophytes
- Clade: Angiosperms
- Clade: Magnoliids
- Order: Magnoliales
- Family: Annonaceae
- Subfamily: Malmeoideae; Chatrou et al. 2012

= Malmeoideae =

Subfamily of plants

The Malmeoideae are a subfamily of trees and other plants of the family Annonaceae.

== Tribes and Genera ==
The Angiosperm Phylogeny Website, which recognises Malmeoideae as one of four subfamilies, containing 9 tribes and the following genera:

=== Annickieae ===
Auth: Couvreur et al., 2019

- Annickia Setten & Maas - monotypic tribe with African genus

=== Piptostigmateae ===
Auth: Chatrou & Saunders 2012 - African genera:

- Brieya De Wild.
- Greenwayodendron Verdc.
- Mwasumbia Couvreur & D.M. Johnson
- Piptostigma Oliv.
- Polyceratocarpus Engl. & Diels
- Sirdavidia Couvreur (monotypic)

=== Malmeeae ===
Auth: Chatrou & Saunders 2012 - tropical Americas

- Bocageopsis R.E.Fr.
- Cremastosperma R.E.Fr.
- Ephedranthus S.Moore
- Klarobelia Chatrou
- Malmea R.E.Fr.
- Mosannona Chatrou
- Onychopetalum R.E.Fr.
- Oxandra A.Rich. (black lancewood)
- Pseudephedranthus Aristeg.
- Pseudomalmea Chatrou
- Pseudoxandra R.E.Fr.
- Ruizodendron R.E.Fr.
- Unonopsis R.E.Fr.

=== Maasieae ===
Auth: Chatrou & Saunders 2012

- Maasia Mols et al. - W Indo-China to New Guinea

=== Fenerivieae ===
Auth: Chatrou & Saunders 2012

- Fenerivia Diels - Madagascar endemic

=== Phoenicantheae ===
- Phoenicanthus Alston - Sri Lanka

=== Dendrokingstonieae ===
Auth: Chatrou & Saunders 2012

- Dendrokingstonia Rauschert - western Malesia

=== Monocarpieae ===
Auth: Chatrou & Saunders 2012

- Monocarpia Miq. - western Malesia
- Leoheo Chaowasku – Vietnam

=== Miliuseae ===
Auth: Hooker & Thomson 1855

- Alphonsea Hook.f. & Thomson (southern China to tropical Asia)
- Desmopsis Saff. (Mexico to Colombia, Cuba)
- Huberantha Chaowasku (tropical & subtropical Africa & Asia, Madagascar, southwestern Pacific)
- Marsypopetalum Scheff. (Hainan, Indo-China to western & central Malesia)
- Meiogyne Miq. (India, Indochina to Australia, Fiji)
- Miliusa Lesch. ex A.DC. (tropical & subtropical Asia to northern Australia)
- Mitrephora (Blume) Hook.f. & Thomson (southern India, Southeast Asia)
- Monoon Miq. (India, Indo-China, Malesia, New Guinea and Australia)
- Neo-uvaria Airy Shaw (Indo-China to W. & central Malesia)
- Orophea Blume (tropical & subtropical Asia)
- Phaeanthus Hook.f. & Thomson (Vietnam to New Guinea)
- Platymitra Boerl. (Thailand to W. & central Malesia)
- Polyalthia Blume (Madagascar, tropical & subtropical Asia to northeastern Australia)
- Polyalthiopsis Chaowasku (Vietnam)
- Popowia Endl. (tropical Asia and Africa and Oceania)
- Pseuduvaria Miq. (tropical SE Asia)
- Sageraea Dalzell (tropical Asia)
- Sapranthus Seem. (Mexico to Colombia)
- Stelechocarpus Hook.f. & Thompson (Indo-China to western and central Malesia)
- Stenanona Standl. (Mexico, Central and South America)
- Tridimeris Baill. (Mexico)
- Trivalvaria (Miq.) Miq. (tropical Asia including Hainan)
- Wangia X. Guo & R.M.K. Saunders (central & southern China)
- Wuodendron B.Xue, Y.H.Tan & Chaowasku (China, Vietnam)
