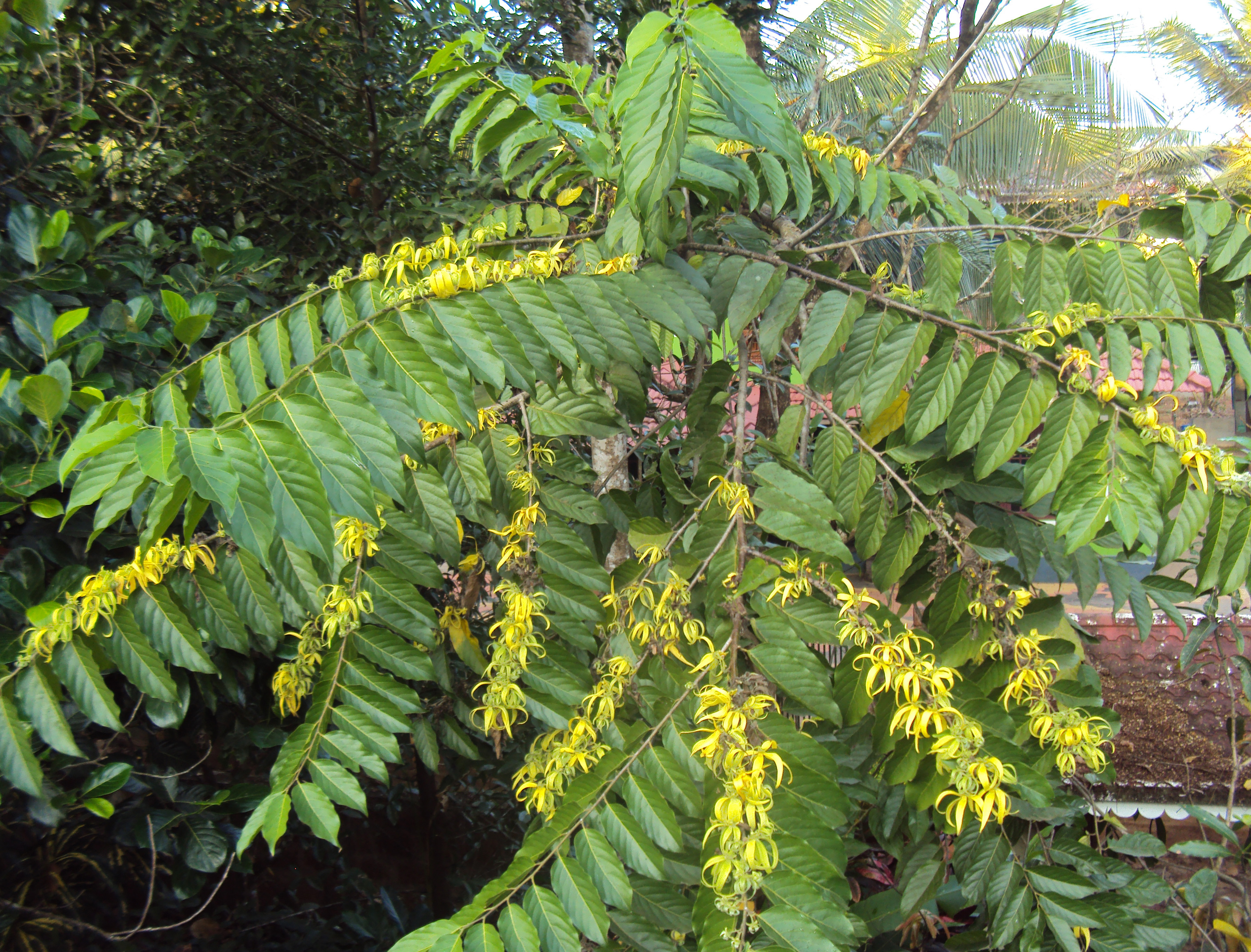
- Flowering

Conservation status
- Least Concern (IUCN 3.1)

Scientific classification
- Kingdom: Plantae
- Clade: Tracheophytes
- Clade: Angiosperms
- Clade: Magnoliids
- Order: Magnoliales
- Family: Annonaceae
- Genus: Cananga
- Species: C. odorata

Binomial name
- Cananga odorata (Lam.) Hook.f. & Thomson

Varieties
- Cananga odorata var. fruticosa (Craib) J.Sinclair; Cananga odorata var. odorata

Synonyms
- 25 synonyms: for Canaga odorata; Canangium odoratum (Lam.) Baill. ex King; Unona odorata (Lam.) Dunal; Uvaria javanica Thunb.; Uvaria odorata Lam.; for var. odorata; Cananga mitrastigma (F.Muell.) Domin; Cananga scortechinii King; Canangium mitrastigma (F.Muell.) Domin; Canangium scortechinii King; Fitzgeraldia mitrastigma F.Muell.; Unona cananga Spreng.; Unona fitzgeraldii F.Muell.; Unona leptopetala DC.; Unona odoratissima Blanco; Unona ossea Blanco; Uvaria axillaris Roxb.; Uvaria cananga Banks; Uvaria farcta Wall.; Uvaria gaertneri Dunal; Uvaria hortensis Noronha; Uvaria ossea (Blanco) Blanco; Uvaria trifoliata Gaertn.; Uvaria undulata Lam.; for var. fruticosa; Canangium fruticosum Craib; Canangium odoratum var. fruticosum (Craib) Coner; Cananga fruticosa Craib

= Cananga odorata =

Ylang-ylang

Species of tree

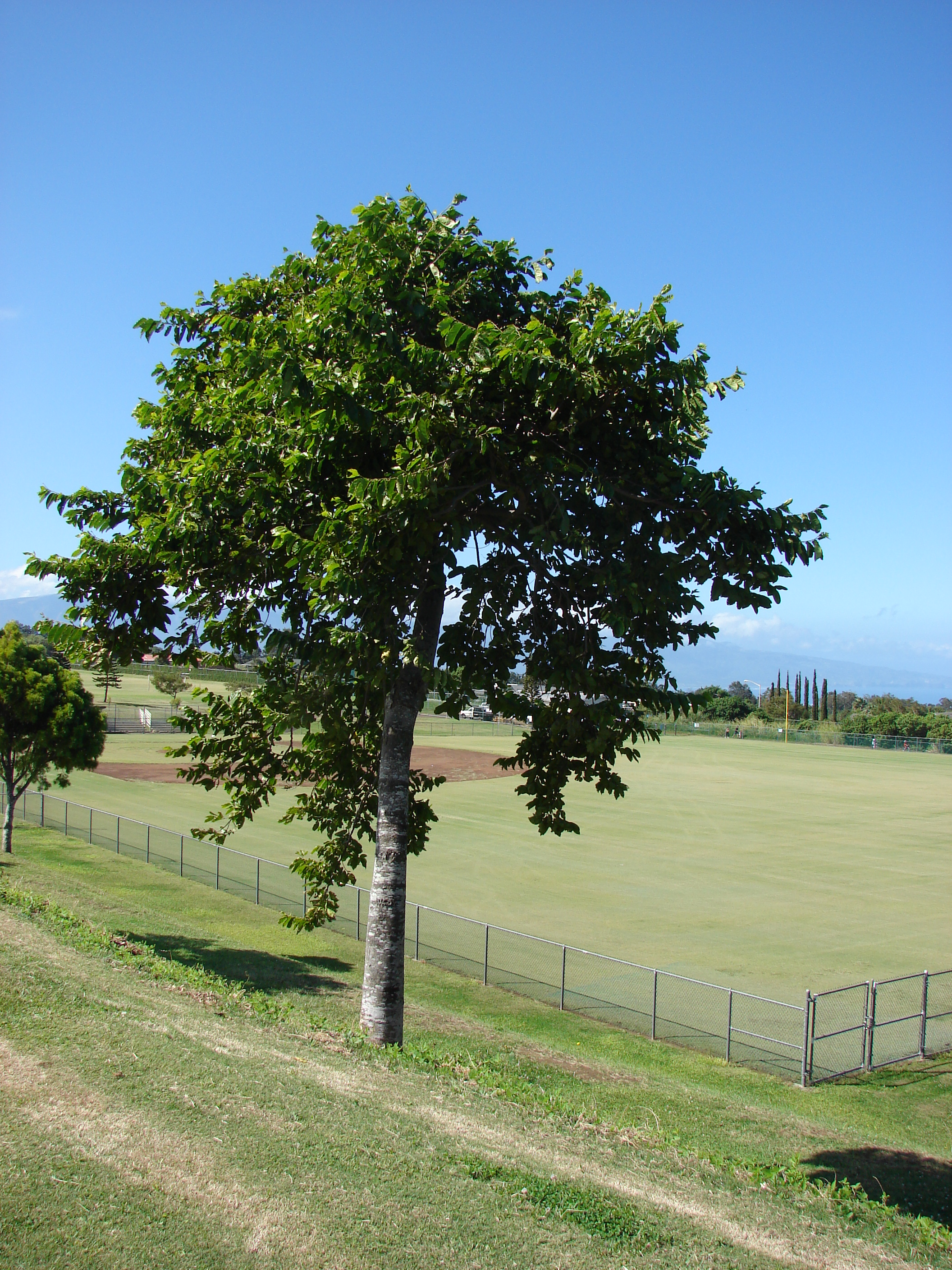
A Cananga odorata in Maui

Cananga odorata, commonly known as ylang-ylang (/ˈiːlæŋ ˈiːlæŋ/), Macassar oil tree, perfume tree or cananga, is a species of plant in the custard apple family Annonaceae. It is native to areas from Indochina to northeastern Australia, and has been introduced to many other regions. It is valued for the essential oil, also called ylang-ylang, which is extracted from the flowers. Ylang-ylang is one of the most extensively used natural fragrances in the perfume industry.

== Description ==
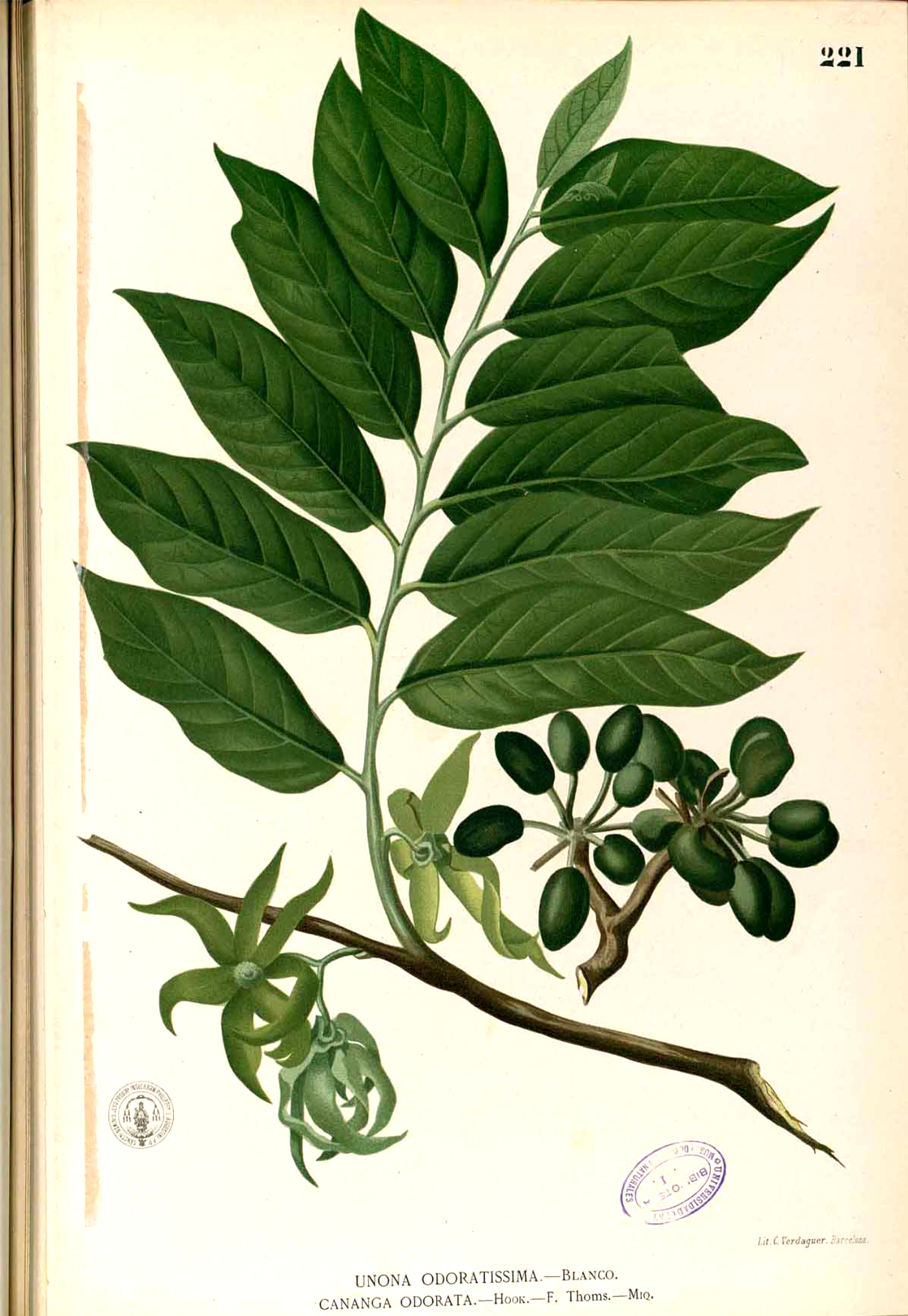
Cananga odorata illustrated in Francisco Manuel Blanco's Flora de Filipinas

Cananga odorata is a fast-growing evergreen tree reaching up to 30 m (98 ft) in height, usually with a straight cylindrical trunk. The compound evergreen leaves are pinnate; the leaflets are ovate and pointed and with wavy margins. They measure up to 22 cm (8.7 in) long and 9 cm (3.5 in) wide with 8–11 pairs of lateral veins. The inflorescences occur in the leaf axils or on the branches, and take the form of a cyme or panicle. The very fragrant flowers are held on stems up to 5 cm (2.0 in) long. They have a small green calyx and six yellow petals up to 9 cm (3.5 in) long. The pollen grains are large (up to 107 μm), and shed as permanent tetrads.

== Taxonomy ==
The species was first described as Uvaria odorata in 1785 by Jean-Baptiste Lamarck, and published in the book Encyclopédie Méthodique. In 1855, British botanists Joseph Dalton Hooker and Thomas Thomson transferred it to the current genus in their book Flora Indica.

The genus Cananga is placed in the family Annonaceae, subfamily Ambavioideae, with sister genera Ambavia, Cleistopholis, Cyathocalyx, Drepananthus, Lettowianthus, Meiocarpidium, Mezzettia and Tetrameranthus. Cananga contains only two species, the subject species and Cananga brandisiana.

Two varieties are recognised: C. odorata var. fruticosa, and the autonym C. odorata var. odorata.

=== Etymology ===
The name Cananga is derived from the Malay word kananga. 'Ylang-ylang' is the Spanish spelling of the Tagalog name for the tree, ilang-ilang. A common mistranslation is 'flower of flowers'.

=== Common names ===
In English, it is also called perfume tree, Macassar oil tree, or fragrant cananga. It is called *kanaŋa in Malay, Ngaju Dayak, Makassarese, Sundanese, Old Javanese, Buruese and Manggarai.

Polynesian names include mataʻoi or motoʻoi (Cook Islands), mohokoi (Tonga), mosoʻoi (Samoa), motoʻoi (Hawaii), and mokosoi, mokasoi or mokohoi (Fiji). Other traditional names include sampangi (Telugu).

== Distribution and habitat ==
The plant is native to Vietnam, Thailand, Peninsula Malaysia, Borneo, Java, Sumatra, Sulawesi, the Lesser Sunda Islands, the Philippines, New Guinea, the Solomon Islands and the Australian state of Queensland. It has been introduced to other tropical parts of Asia from India to Taiwan, as well as parts of Africa, central America and the Caribbean.

It grows in full or partial sun, and prefers the acidic soils of its native rainforest habitat. Ylang-ylang has been cultivated in temperate climates under conservatory conditions.

== Ecology ==
Its clusters of black fruit are an important food item for birds, such as the collared imperial pigeon, purple-tailed imperial pigeon, Zoe's imperial pigeon, superb fruit dove, pink-spotted fruit dove, coroneted fruit dove, orange-bellied fruit dove, and wompoo fruit dove. The Sulawesi red-knobbed hornbill serves as an effective seed disperser for C. odorata.

== Uses ==
The essential oil is used as a perfume, often for soap making. The perfumes are oriental- or floral-themed. Ylang-ylang blends well with most floral, fruit, and wood scents. The aroma of ylang-ylang is described as "sweet, floral, balsamic, green, spicy, animal, woody, waxy, leathery".

In Indonesia, ylang-ylang flowers are spread on the bed of newlywed couples. In the Philippines, its flowers, together with the flowers of the sampaguita, are strung into a necklace (lei) and worn by women and used to adorn religious images.

Ylang-ylang's essential oil makes up 29% of the Comoros' annual export (1998).

Ylang-ylang is grown in Madagascar and exported globally for its essential oils.

Ylang-ylang essential oil is one of the basic ingredients of macassar oil.

== Ylang-ylang essential oil ==
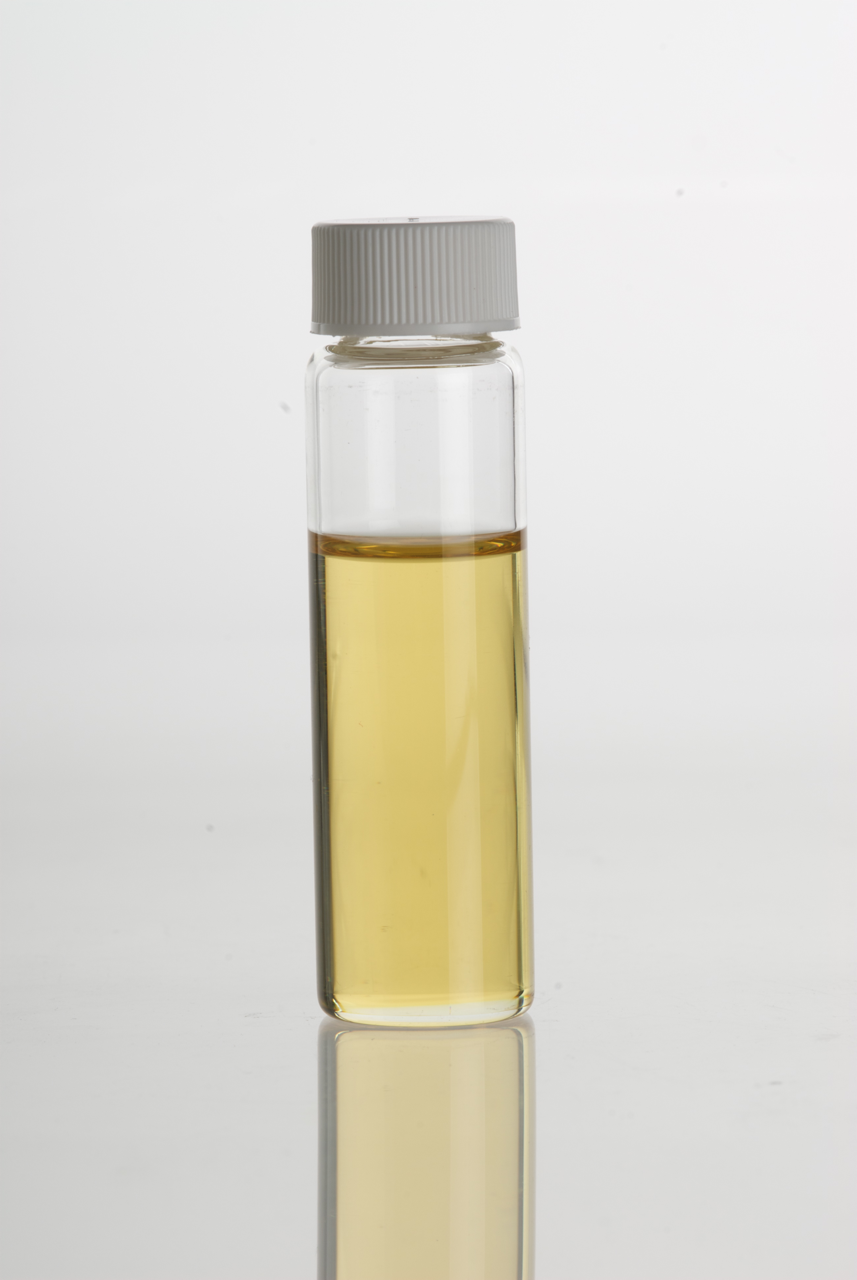
Ylang-ylang (Cananga odorata) essential oil

The fragrance of ylang-ylang is rich and deep with notes of rubber and custard, and bright with hints of jasmine and neroli, thus it is sometimes described as heavy, sweet, and carries a slightly fruity floral scent. The essential oil of the flower is obtained through steam distillation of the flowers and separated into different grades (extra, 1, 2, or 3) according to when the distillates are obtained.

Ylang-ylang essential oil contain the following:

- Linalool
- Germacrene
- Geranyl acetate
- Caryophyllene
- p-Cresyl methyl ether
- Methyl benzoate

The following sesquiterpenes are also found: caryophyllene, germacrene, and (E,E)-α-farnesene. The related cananga oil has a similar composition but much greater concentrations of aryophyllene.

== See also ==
- Artabotrys hexapetalus, a related plant which produced a similar essential oil
- Jasminum sambac, the Arabian jasmine, another plant widely used in perfumes
- Domaine Ylang Ylang
