= Polyceratocarpus scheffleri =

Conservation status
- Endangered (IUCN 3.1)

Scientific classification
- Kingdom: Plantae
- Clade: Embryophytes
- Clade: Tracheophytes
- Clade: Spermatophytes
- Clade: Angiosperms
- Clade: Magnoliids
- Order: Magnoliales
- Family: Annonaceae
- Genus: Polyceratocarpus
- Species: P. scheffleri

Binomial name
- Polyceratocarpus scheffleri Engl. & Diels

Synonyms
- Dielsina schefferi (Engl. & Diels) Kuntze

Species of flowering plant

Polyceratocarpus scheffleri is a species of plant in the Annonaceae family. It is endemic to Tanzania.
