= Trivalvaria nervosa =

Conservation status
- Least Concern (IUCN 3.1)

Scientific classification
- Kingdom: Plantae
- Clade: Embryophytes
- Clade: Tracheophytes
- Clade: Spermatophytes
- Clade: Angiosperms
- Clade: Magnoliids
- Order: Magnoliales
- Family: Annonaceae
- Genus: Trivalvaria
- Species: T. nervosa

Binomial name
- Trivalvaria nervosa (Hook.f. & Thomson) J.Sinclair

Synonyms
- Ellipeia nervosa Hook.f. & Thomson; Popowia nervosa (Hook.f. & Thomson) Ridl.

Species of tree

Trivalvaria nervosa is a species of flowering plant in the family Annonaceae. It is a tree native to Peninsular Malaysia and Peninsular Thailand.
