= Leoheo =

Scientific classification
- Kingdom: Plantae
- Clade: Tracheophytes
- Clade: Angiosperms
- Clade: Magnoliids
- Order: Magnoliales
- Family: Annonaceae
- Subfamily: Malmeoideae
- Tribe: Monocarpieae
- Genus: Leoheo; Chaowasku (2018)
- Species: L. domatiophorus

Binomial name
- Leoheo domatiophorus Chaowasku, D.T.Ngo & Hung T.Le (2018)

Genus of flowering plants

Leoheo domatiophorus is a species of flowering plant in the family Annonaceae. It is the sole species in genus Leoheo. It is a medium-sized to large evergreen tree endemic to Vietnam. It grows 15 to 25 meters tall, and occasionally to 30 meters. It flowers in March and fruits in July. The genus name is derived from "Lèo Heo" the local Vietnamese name of the plant.

The genus and species were first described in 2018. A phylogenetic analysis placed the plant in the tribe Monocarpieae, as a sister to genus Monocarpia. The genus is distinguished from Monocarpia by the absence of intramarginal leaf veins and axillary inflorescences.

It is native to lowland evergreen rainforest in Nam Đông in A Luoi districts of Huế, and in adjacent Quang Tri and Quang Nam provinces, where it typically grows at the edges of primary and secondary forests.
