= Maasia =

Scientific classification
- Kingdom: Plantae
- Clade: Tracheophytes
- Clade: Angiosperms
- Clade: Magnoliids
- Order: Magnoliales
- Family: Annonaceae
- Subfamily: Malmeoideae
- Genus: Maasia; Mols, Kessler & Rogstad

Genus of plants

Maasia is a genus of flowering plants belonging to the family Annonaceae.

Its native range is Indo-China to New Guinea. It is found in Andaman Islands, Borneo, Java, Malaya, Maluku Islands, Myanmar, Nicobar Islands, Philippines, Sulawesi, Sumatera and Thailand.

The genus name of Maasia is in honour of Paul Maas (born 1939), a botanist from the Netherlands and a specialist in the flora of the neotropics. It was first described and published in Syst. Bot. Vol. 33 on page 493 in 2008. The name Mosannona Chatrou (1998), Annonaceae, was also named after him.

== Species ==
According to Kew:

- Maasia discolor (Diels) Mols, Kessler & Rogstad
- Maasia glauca (Hassk.) Mols, Kessler & Rogstad
- Maasia hypoleuca (Hook.f. & Thomson) Mols, Kessler & Rogstad
- Maasia multinervis (Diels) Mols, Kessler & Rogstad
- Maasia ovalifolia (Rogstad) Mols, Kessler & Rogstad
- Maasia sumatrana (Miq.) Mols, Kessler & Rogstad
