= Domaine Ylang Ylang =

Distillery in Mauritius

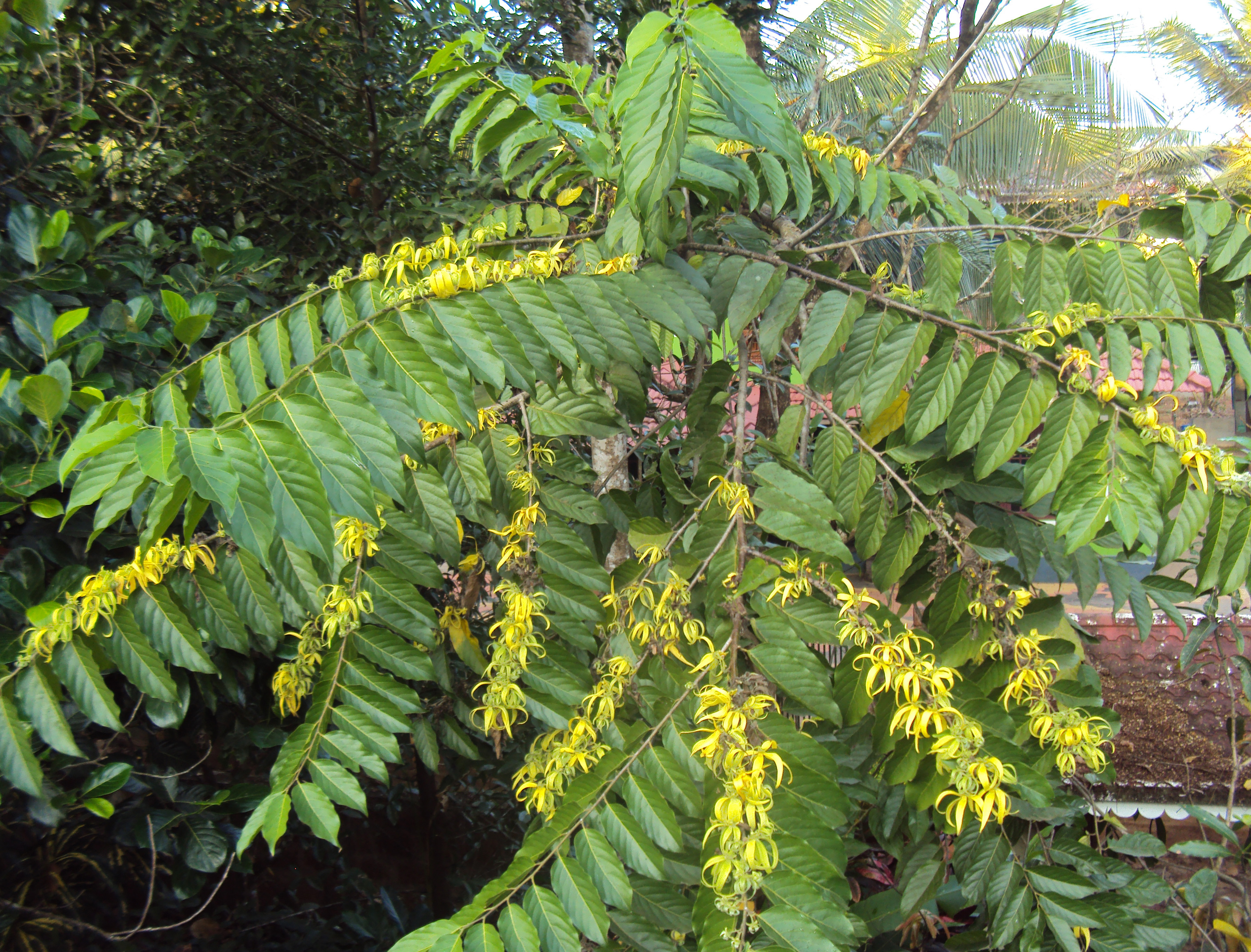
Cananga odorata

Domaine Ylang Ylang is the oldest distillery in Mauritius to produce oil from the ylang ylang (Cananga odorata) tree. The plantation of ylang ylang trees alongside the distillery, provided the flowers from which perfume was distilled. The Domaine Ylang Ylang further up the Kestrel Valley commands a view onto the wide lagoon of Vieux Grand Port of Mahebourg and the neighbouring islets on the central east coast of Mauritius.

Although the distillery stopped functioning after 2002 when it had been popular with tourists looking for essential oils and aromatherapy, the laboratory and building can still be seen.

== Domaine du Chasseur ==
In the adjoining Kestrel Valley (also historically known as the Domaine du Chasseur Game Park and Reserve) forest and nature hiking are available for nature-lovers over an area of more than 200 ha, where the Mauritius kestrel (Falco punctatus) can be seen. It is an important protected area for many other endemic plants and animal species in Mauritius.

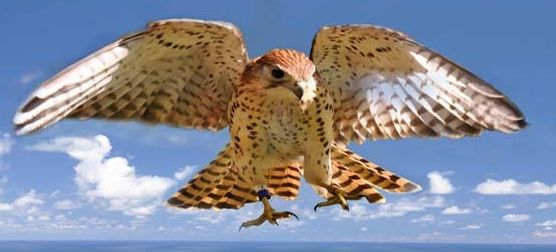
Mauritius kestrel
