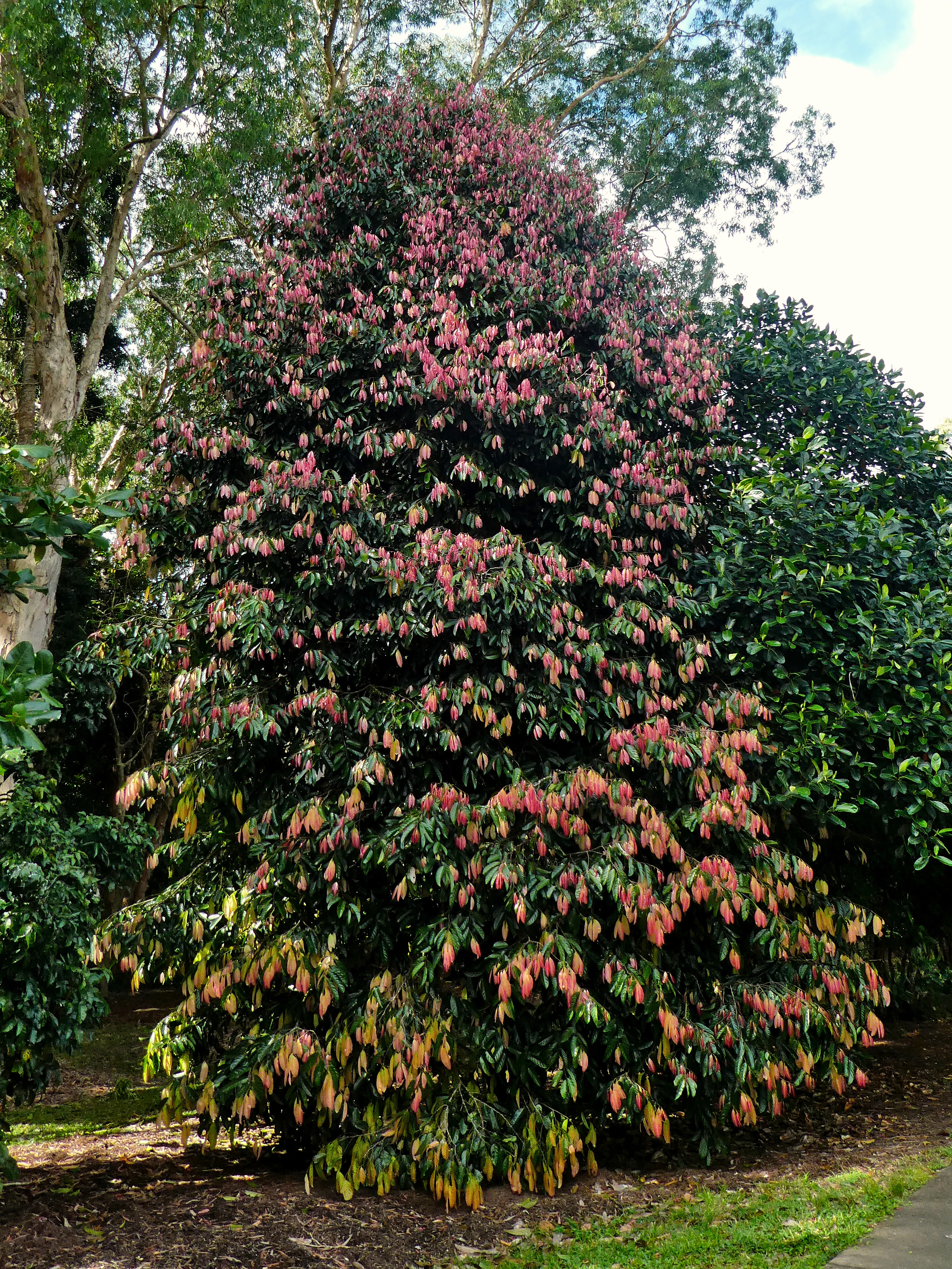
- Stelechocarpus burahol

Scientific classification
- Kingdom: Plantae
- Clade: Tracheophytes
- Clade: Angiosperms
- Clade: Magnoliids
- Order: Magnoliales
- Family: Annonaceae
- Subfamily: Malmeoideae
- Tribe: Miliuseae
- Genus: Stelechocarpus; Hook.f. & Thomson

Synonyms
- Winitia Chaowasku

= Stelechocarpus =

Genus of flowering plants

Stelechocarpus is a genus of flowering plants belonging to the family Annonaceae. Its native range is Indo-China to western and central Malesia.

== Description ==
Plants in this genus are trees growing to about 25 m (82 ft) in height with all parts hairless, or nearly so. They are monoecious, i.e. flowers are either male or female, and both sexes are produced on each plant. Inflorescences emerge from warty protuberances on the trunk and branches, usually with the female inflorescences lower down on the tree than the male ones. Flowers have three sepals and two whorls of three petals each. Male flowers have many stamens; female flowers have few stamens and many carpels; the fruits are globose monocarps.

== Distribution ==
They are native to Thailand, Laos, Peninsular Malaysia, Borneo, Java and Sumatra.

== Taxonomy ==
The genus was first described by Joseph Dalton Hooker and [[Thomas Thomson (botanist}|Thomas Thomson]] in 1885.

== Species ==
As of December 2025, Plants of the World Online accepts the following three species:

- Stelechocarpus burahol (Blume) Hook.f. & Thomson
- Stelechocarpus cauliflorus (Scheff.) R.E.Fr.
- Stelechocarpus expansus (Chaowasku) I.M.Turner
