= Lukea =

Scientific classification
- Kingdom: Plantae
- Clade: Tracheophytes
- Clade: Angiosperms
- Clade: Magnoliids
- Order: Magnoliales
- Family: Annonaceae
- Subfamily: Annonoideae
- Tribe: Monodoreae
- Genus: Lukea; Cheek & Gosline (2022)

Species
- Lukea quentinii Cheek & Gosline; Lukea triciae Cheek & Gosline

Genus of flowering plants

Lukea is a genus of flowering plants in the family Annonaceae. It includes two species native to Kenya and Tanzania.

- Lukea quentinii Cheek & Gosline – Kenya
- Lukea triciae Cheek & Gosline – Tanzania

A phylogenetic study published in 2023 placed Lukea in tribe Monodoreae as sister to genus Mischogyne.
