= Brieya =

Scientific classification
- Kingdom: Plantae
- Clade: Tracheophytes
- Clade: Angiosperms
- Clade: Magnoliids
- Order: Magnoliales
- Family: Annonaceae
- Subfamily: Malmeoideae
- Tribe: Piptostigmateae
- Genus: Brieya; De Wild.

Genus of flowering plants

Brieya is a genus of flowering plants belonging to the family Annonaceae.

Its native range is Western and Western Central Tropical Africa.

Species:

- Brieya fasciculata De Wild.
- Brieya latipetala Exell
