= Froesiodendron =

Scientific classification
- Kingdom: Plantae
- Clade: Tracheophytes
- Clade: Angiosperms
- Clade: Magnoliids
- Order: Magnoliales
- Family: Annonaceae
- Subfamily: Annonoideae
- Tribe: Bocageeae
- Genus: Froesiodendron; R.E.Fr.

Species
- See text

Genus of plants in the soursop family

Froesiodendron is a genus of flowering plants in the custard apple and soursop family Annonaceae, with all species native to South America.

== Species ==
Species currently accepted by The Plant List are as follows:

- Froesiodendron amazonicum R.E.Fr.
- Froesiodendron longicuspe (R.E.Fr.) N.A.Murray
- Froesiodendron urceocalyx N.A.Murray
