= Pseudomalmea =

Scientific classification
- Kingdom: Plantae
- Clade: Tracheophytes
- Clade: Angiosperms
- Clade: Magnoliids
- Order: Magnoliales
- Family: Annonaceae
- Tribe: Malmeeae
- Genus: Pseudomalmea; Chatrou

Genus of flowering plants

Pseudomalmea is a genus of flowering plants belonging to the family Annonaceae.

Its native range is Southern Tropical America.

Species:

- Pseudomalmea boyacana (J.F.Macbr.) Chatrou
- Pseudomalmea darienensis Chatrou
- Pseudomalmea diclina (R.E.Fr.) Chatrou
- Pseudomalmea wingfieldii Chatrou
