= Dendrokingstonia =

Scientific classification
- Kingdom: Plantae
- Clade: Tracheophytes
- Clade: Angiosperms
- Clade: Magnoliids
- Order: Magnoliales
- Family: Annonaceae
- Subfamily: Malmeoideae
- Genus: Dendrokingstonia; Rauschert

Genus of plants

Dendrokingstonia is a genus of flowering plants belonging to the family Annonaceae.

Its native range is Western Malesia.

The genus name of Dendrokingstonia is a portmanteau word, combining the Ancient Greek word of δένδρον (déndron) meaning tree and (Kingston) from John Filmore Kingston (1795–1860), who was an English botanist who wrote about the flora of Devon in 1829.

Known species:

- Dendrokingstonia acuminata (Miq.) Chaowasku
- Dendrokingstonia gardneri Chaowasku
- Dendrokingstonia nervosa (Hook.f. & Thomson) Rauschert
