= Phoenicanthus =

Scientific classification
- Kingdom: Plantae
- Clade: Tracheophytes
- Clade: Angiosperms
- Clade: Magnoliids
- Order: Magnoliales
- Family: Annonaceae
- Subfamily: Malmeoideae
- Genus: Phoenicanthus; Alston

Genus of plants

Phoenicanthus is a genus of flowering plants belonging to the family Annonaceae.

Its native range is Sri Lanka.

Species:

- Phoenicanthus coriacea (Thwaites) H.Huber
- Phoenicanthus obliquus (Hook.f. & Thomson) Alston
