= Wuodendron =

Conservation status
- Endangered (IUCN 3.1)

Scientific classification
- Kingdom: Plantae
- Clade: Tracheophytes
- Clade: Angiosperms
- Clade: Magnoliids
- Order: Magnoliales
- Family: Annonaceae
- Subfamily: Malmeoideae
- Tribe: Miliuseae
- Genus: Wuodendron; B.Xue, Y.H.Tan & Chaowasku
- Species: W. praecox

Binomial name
- Wuodendron praecox (Hook.f. & Thomson) B.Xue, Y.H.Tan & X.L.Hou

Synonyms
- Polyalthia litseifolia C.Y.Wu ex P.T.Li; Desmos praecox (Hook.f. & Thomson) Saff.; Unona praecox Hook.f. & Thomson

Genus of flowering plants

Wuodendron is a genus of plants in the family Annonaceae and tribe Miliuseae, containing the type and only species Wuodendron praecox. It is distributed from northeastern India north to southern China and southeast through most of Mainland Southeast Asia.

== Conservation status and description ==
The single species (under its synonym P. litseifolia) is described as a subtropical and tropical forest tree growing to 40 m tall, with greyish brown bark and glabrous, brown branches. Under this name it has been considered Endangered on the IUCN Red List, which considers it to have a much smaller range (only Yunnan, China) than the wider range now recorded, considering the synonyms and revised nomenclature.

The leaves are elliptic and 90-200 × 45-80 mm on 6-10 mm petioles; they are adaxially furrowed, glabrous and often with an axillary bud at the base. Reticulate veins are elevated on both surfaces, with 10-16 secondary veins on each side of midvein. Inflorescences are single-flowered and axillary, on 20 - 35 mm, glabrous peduncles. Sepals are triangular to lanceolate, approx. 12 mm, puberulent on the outside and glabrous inside. The petals are broadly linear, 60-90 × 7-11 mm, with a midrib and 2-4 parallel secondary veins. There are many stamens, approx. 1.5 mm, truncate at the apices. There are 5 or 6, glabrous carpels, with 3 ovules per carpel; stigmas are clavate and puberulent. The fruit are oblong to ovoid (30-35 × 20-25 mm) and singular on 10-30 mm stalks; constricted between seeds (typically 3 per monocarp), glabrous and warty. In southern China, flowering is from April-July and fruiting is from May-September.
