= Ruizodendron =

Conservation status
- Least Concern (IUCN 3.1)

Scientific classification
- Kingdom: Plantae
- Clade: Embryophytes
- Clade: Tracheophytes
- Clade: Spermatophytes
- Clade: Angiosperms
- Clade: Magnoliids
- Order: Magnoliales
- Family: Annonaceae
- Subfamily: Malmeoideae
- Tribe: Malmeeae
- Genus: Ruizodendron; R.E.Fr.
- Species: R. ovale

Binomial name
- Ruizodendron ovale (Ruiz & Pav.) R.E.Fr.

Synonyms
- Guatteria ovalis Ruiz & Pav.

Genus of plants

Ruizodendron is a monotypic genus of flowering plants belonging to the family Annonaceae. It is part of Malmeoideae subfamily and Malmeeae tribe. The only known species is Ruizodendron ovale.

Its native range is western South America and it is found in northern Brazil, Bolivia, Colombia, Ecuador, Honduras and Peru. It grows in tropical rain forests.

The genus name of Ruizodendron is in honour of Hipólito Ruiz López (1754–1815), a Spanish botanist known for researching the floras of Peru and Chile during an expedition under Carlos III from 1777 to 1788, and the Greek word for tree dendron. The Latin specific epithet of ovale is derived from Latin ovum meaning egg-shaped. Both the genus and the species were first described and published in Ark. Bot. Vol.28 (Edition 4) on page 3 in 1936.
