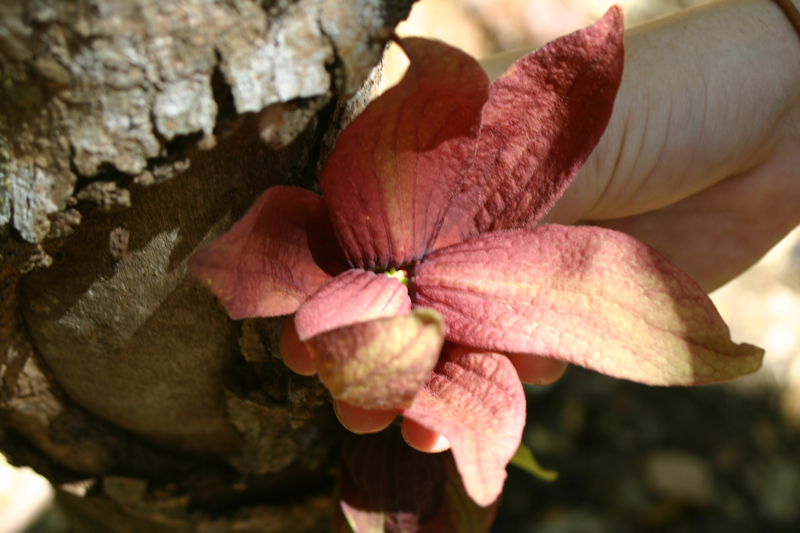
- Sapranthus flower

Scientific classification
- Kingdom: Plantae
- Clade: Embryophytes
- Clade: Tracheophytes
- Clade: Angiosperms
- Clade: Magnoliids
- Order: Magnoliales
- Family: Annonaceae
- Tribe: Miliuseae
- Genus: Sapranthus; Seem.

Species
- See text.

= Sapranthus =

Genus of flowering plants

Sapranthus is a genus of flowering woody plants in the family Annonaceae. The genus was first described in 1866 by Berthold Carl Seemann.

== Description ==
Plants in this genus are shrubs or trees. The flowers are solitary and terminal and have six petals. The flowers have a characteristic foetid odour (giving the generic name) and are pollinated by beetles.

== Species ==
Plants of the World Online gives the following as accepted species:

- Sapranthus campechianus (Kunth) Standl.
- Sapranthus chiapensis Standl. ex G.E.Schatz
- Sapranthus hirsutus van Rooden ex G.E.Schatz
- Sapranthus isae J.G.Vélez & Cogollo
- Sapranthus microcarpus (Donn.Sm.) R.E.Fr.
- Sapranthus palanga R.E.Fr.
- Sapranthus violaceus (Dunal) Saff.
- Sapranthus viridiflorus G.E.Schatz
- Sapranthus pinedai Ortiz-Rodriguez
- Sapranthus foetidus (Rosa) Safford
