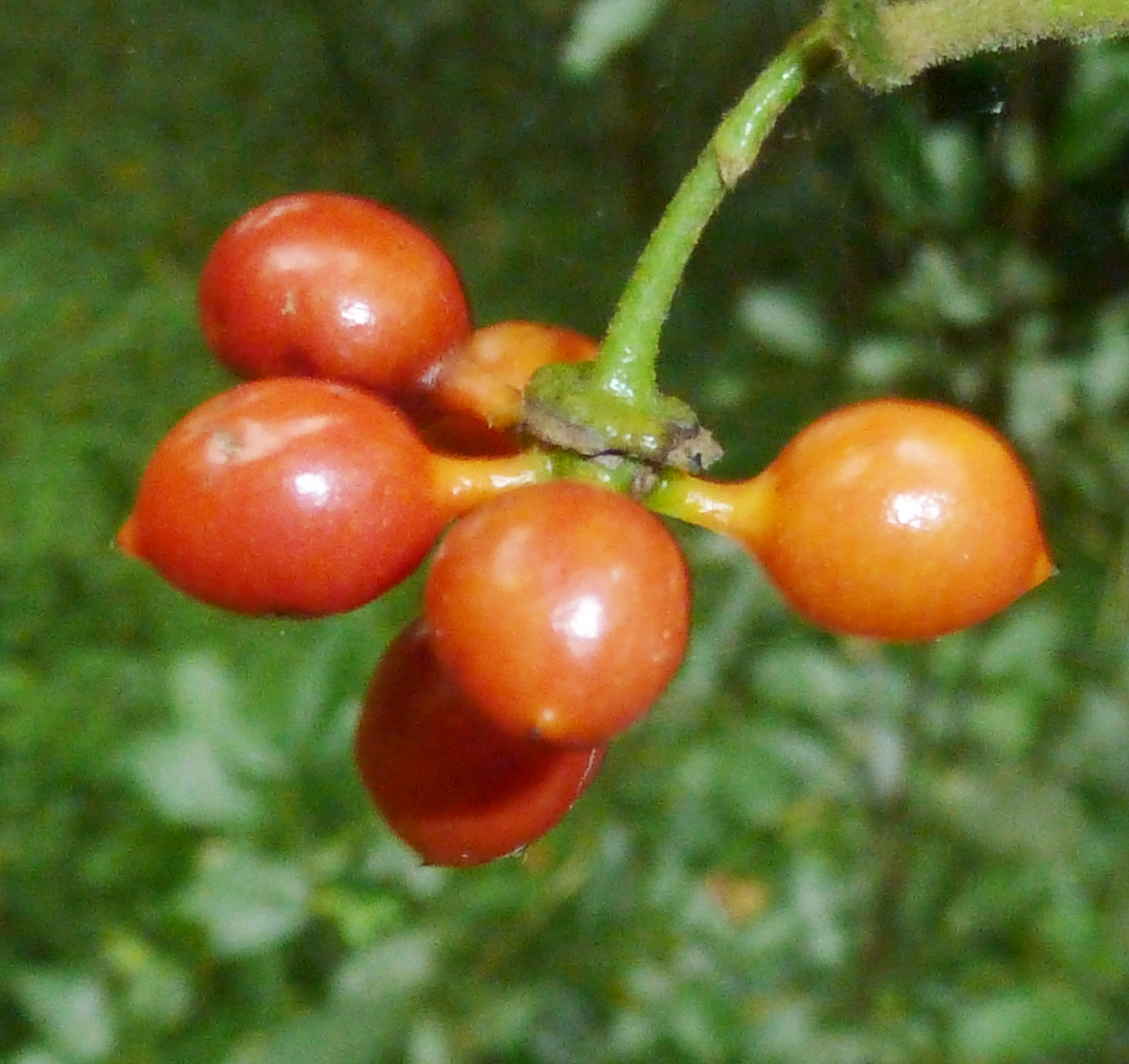
- M. afra fruit in South Africa

Scientific classification
- Kingdom: Plantae
- Clade: Tracheophytes
- Clade: Angiosperms
- Clade: Magnoliids
- Order: Magnoliales
- Family: Annonaceae
- Subfamily: Annonoideae
- Tribe: Uvarieae
- Genus: Monanthotaxis; Baill., 1890

Type species
- Monanthotaxis congoensis Baill.

Species
- See text

Synonyms
- Atopostema Boutique, 1951; Clathrospermum Planch. ex Benth.; Enneastemon Exell, 1932, nom. cons.; Exellia Boutique; Gilbertiella Boutique

= Monanthotaxis =

Genus of flowering plants

Monanthotaxis is an Afrotropical plant genus with some 56 species, belonging to the Annonaceae. They are native to the tropics and subtropics of southeastern Africa and Madagascar.

== Selected species ==
- Monanthotaxis ambrensis
- Monanthotaxis angustifolia
- Monanthotaxis barteri
- Monanthotaxis bicornis

== Bibliography ==
1. Schatz, G. E., et al., 2011. Catalogue of the Vascular Plants of Madagascar. Monogr. Syst. Bot. Missouri Bot. Gard.
