= Neo-uvaria =

Scientific classification
- Kingdom: Plantae
- Clade: Embryophytes
- Clade: Tracheophytes
- Clade: Spermatophytes
- Clade: Angiosperms
- Clade: Magnoliids
- Order: Magnoliales
- Family: Annonaceae
- Tribe: Miliuseae
- Genus: Neo-uvaria; Airy Shaw

Genus of flowering plants

Neo-uvaria is a genus of flowering plants belonging to the family Annonaceae.

Its native range is Indo-China to Western and Central Malesia.

Species:

- Neo-uvaria acuminatissima (Miq.) Airy Shaw
- Neo-uvaria laosensis Tagane & Soulad.
- Neo-uvaria merrillii (C.B.Rob.) Chaowasku
- Neo-uvaria parallelivenia (Boerl.) H.Okada & K.Ueda
- Neo-uvaria sparsistellata Chaowasku
- Neo-uvaria telopea Chaowasku
- Neo-uvaria viridifolia (Elmer) Chaowasku
