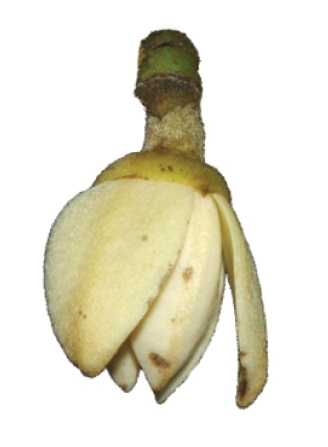
- Polyceratocarpus parviflorus flower

Scientific classification
- Kingdom: Plantae
- Clade: Tracheophytes
- Clade: Angiosperms
- Clade: Magnoliids
- Order: Magnoliales
- Family: Annonaceae
- Subfamily: Malmeoideae
- Tribe: Piptostigmateae
- Genus: Polyceratocarpus; Engl. & Diels

= Polyceratocarpus =

Genus of flowering plants

Polyceratocarpus is a genus of flowering plants in the family Annonaceae. All known species are native to continental Africa.

Species include:

- Polyceratocarpus angustifolius, Paiva
- Polyceratocarpus askhambryan-iringae
- Polyceratocarpus germainii Botique
- Polyceratocarpus gossweileri, (Exell) Paiva
- Polyceratocarpus laurifolius, Paiva
- Polyceratocarpus microtrichus, (Engl. & Diels) Ghesq. ex Pellegr.
- Polyceratocarpus parviflorus (Baker f.) Ghesq.
- Polyceratocarpus pellegrinii, Le Thomas
- Polyceratocarpus scheffleri, Engl. & Diels
- Polyceratocarpus vermoesenii Robyns & Ghesq.
