= Hornschuchia =

Scientific classification
- Kingdom: Plantae
- Clade: Tracheophytes
- Clade: Angiosperms
- Clade: Magnoliids
- Order: Magnoliales
- Family: Annonaceae
- Genus: Hornschuchia; Nees

Species
- See text

Synonyms
- Mosenodendron R.E.Fr.

Genus of plants in the soursop family

Hornschuchia is a genus of flowering plants in the custard apple and soursop family Annonaceae, with all species native to South America and in eastern Brazil. It is within the Bocageeae tribe.

The genus name of Hornschuchia is in honour of Christian Friedrich Hornschuch (1793–1850), a German botanist born in Bavaria. It was first described and published in Flora Vol.4 on page 302 in 1821.

== Species ==
According to Kew;

- Hornschuchia alba (A.St.-Hil.) R.E.Fr.
- Hornschuchia bryotrophe Nees
- Hornschuchia cauliflora Maas & Setten
- Hornschuchia citriodora D.M.Johnson
- Hornschuchia leptandra D.M.Johnson
- Hornschuchia lianarum D.M.Johnson
- Hornschuchia myrtillus Nees
- Hornschuchia obliqua Maas & Setten
- Hornschuchia polyantha Maas
- Hornschuchia santosii D.M.Johnson

Hornschuchia bryotrophe Nees is the type species.
