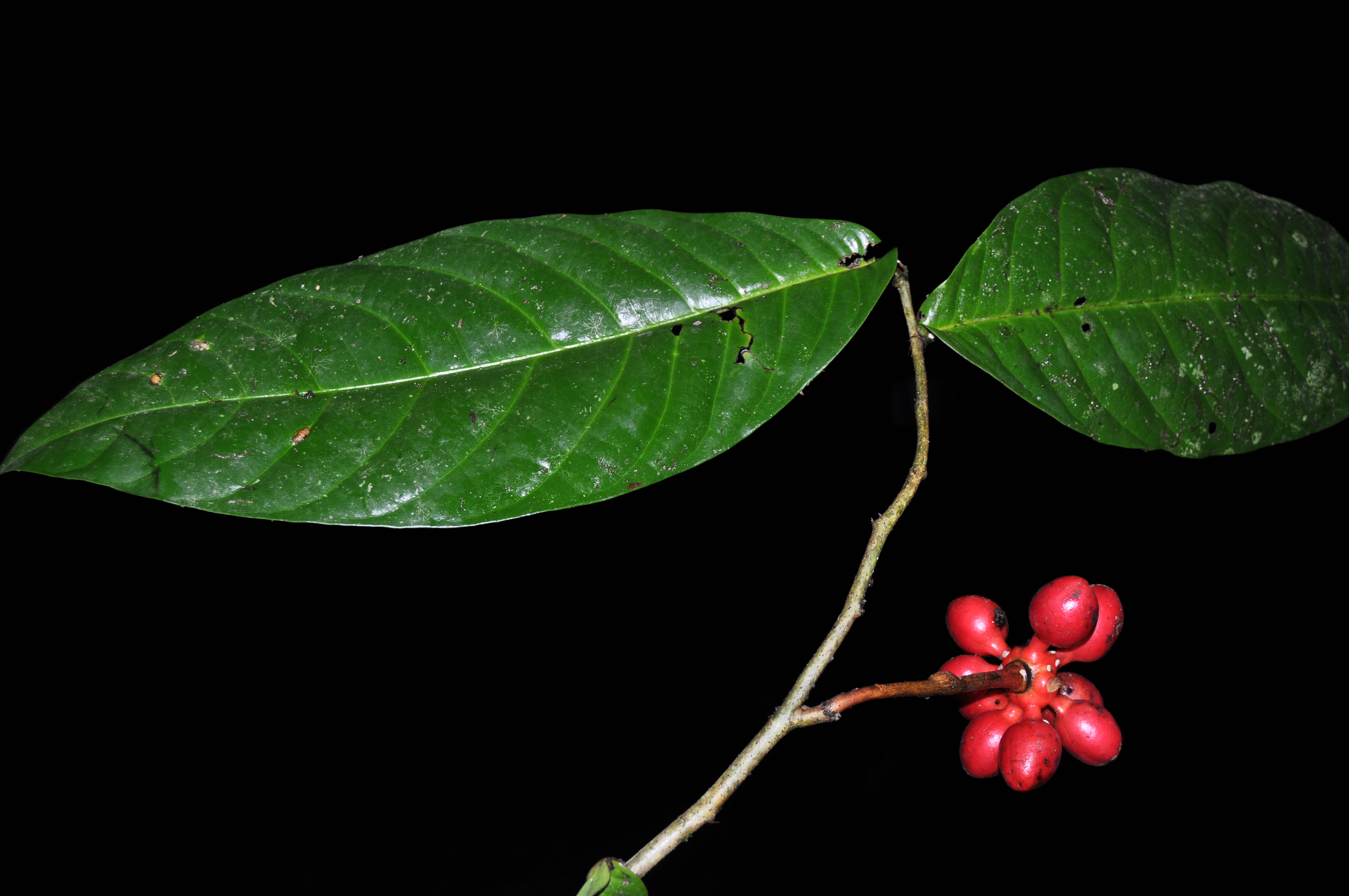
- Desmopsis heteropetala

Scientific classification
- Kingdom: Plantae
- Clade: Tracheophytes
- Clade: Angiosperms
- Clade: Magnoliids
- Order: Magnoliales
- Family: Annonaceae
- Tribe: Miliuseae
- Genus: Desmopsis; Saff.

= Desmopsis =

Genus of flowering plants

Desmopsis is a genus of flowering plants belonging to the family Annonaceae.

Its native range is Mexico to Colombia, Cuba.

Species:

- Desmopsis bibracteata (B.L.Rob.) Saff.
- Desmopsis biseriata G.E.Schatz & Maas
- Desmopsis brachypoda G.E.Schatz & Maas
- Desmopsis dolichopetala R.E.Fr.
- Desmopsis dukei G.E.Schatz
- Desmopsis erythrocarpa Lundell
- Desmopsis guerrerensis Gonz.-Martínez & J.Jiménez Ram.
- Desmopsis heteropetala R.E.Fr.
- Desmopsis lanceolata Lundell
- Desmopsis maxonii Saff.
- Desmopsis mexicana R.E.Fr.
- Desmopsis microcarpa R.E.Fr.
- Desmopsis neglecta (A.Rich.) R.E.Fr.
- Desmopsis nigrescens G.E.Schatz
- Desmopsis oerstedii Saff.
- Desmopsis panamensis (B.L.Rob.) Saff.
- Desmopsis schippii Standl.
- Desmopsis subnuda (R.E.Fr.) G.E.Schatz & Maas
- Desmopsis talamancana G.E.Schatz & Maas
- Desmopsis trunciflora (Schltdl. & Cham.) G.E.Schatz ex Maas, E.A.Mennega & Westra
- Desmopsis uxpanapensis G.E.Schatz
- Desmopsis verrucipes Chatrou, G.E.Schatz & N.Zamora
- Desmopsis wendtii G.E.Schatz
