= Trivalvaria =

Scientific classification
- Kingdom: Plantae
- Clade: Tracheophytes
- Clade: Angiosperms
- Clade: Magnoliids
- Order: Magnoliales
- Family: Annonaceae
- Subfamily: Malmeoideae
- Tribe: Miliuseae
- Genus: Trivalvaria (Miq.) Miq.

Genus of flowering plants

Trivalvaria is a genus of plants in family Annonaceae. It is distributed from India to China and western Malesia.

== Species ==
As of January 2025, Plants of the World Online accepts the following 13 species:

- Trivalvaria argentea (Hook.f. & Thomson) J.Sinclair
- Trivalvaria carnosa (Teijsm. & Binn.) Scheff.
- Trivalvaria casseabriae Y.H.Tan, S.S.Zhou & B.Yang
- Trivalvaria costata (Hook.f. & Thomson) I.M.Turner
- Trivalvaria dubia (Kurz) J.Sinclair
- Trivalvaria kanjilalii D.Das
- Trivalvaria macrophylla (Blume) Miq.
- Trivalvaria nervosa (Hook.f. & Thomson) J.Sinclair
- Trivalvaria ochroleuca Chaowasku & D.M.Johnson
- Trivalvaria recurva Chaowasku & D.M.Johnson
- Trivalvaria rubra Y.H.Tan, S.S.Zhou & B.Yang
- Trivalvaria stenopetala Chaowasku & D.M.Johnson
- Trivalvaria tomentosa B.Xue, Y.H.Tan & Y.S.Chen
