= Fenerivia =

Scientific classification
- Kingdom: Plantae
- Clade: Tracheophytes
- Clade: Angiosperms
- Clade: Magnoliids
- Order: Magnoliales
- Family: Annonaceae
- Subfamily: Malmeoideae
- Tribe: Fenerivieae
- Genus: Fenerivia; Diels

Species
- See text

Genus of plants in the soursop family

Fenerivia is a genus of flowering plants in the custard apple and soursop family Annonaceae, with all species endemic to Madagascar. Fenerivia inflorescences have a prominent flange below the perianth, which is unique to the genus. The complete chloroplast genome of Fenerivia ghesquiereana was published in 2021.

== Species ==
There are nine accepted species:

- Fenerivia angustielliptica (G.E. Schatz & Le Thomas) R.M.K. Saunders
- Fenerivia capuronii (Cavaco & Keraudren) R.M.K. Saunders
- Fenerivia chapelieri (Baill.) R.M.K. Saunders
- Fenerivia emarginata (Diels) R.M.K. Saunders
- Fenerivia ghesquiereana (Cavaco & Keraudren) R.M.K. Saunders
- Fenerivia humbertii (Cavaco & Keraudren) R.M.K. Saunders
- Fenerivia madagascariensis (Cavaco & Keraudren) R.M.K. Saunders
- Fenerivia oligosperma (Danguy) R.M.K.Saunders
- Fenerivia richardiana (Baill.) R.M.K. Saunders
