= Platymitra =

Scientific classification
- Kingdom: Plantae
- Clade: Tracheophytes
- Clade: Angiosperms
- Clade: Magnoliids
- Order: Magnoliales
- Family: Annonaceae
- Subfamily: Malmeoideae
- Tribe: Miliuseae
- Genus: Platymitra; Boerl.

Genus of plants

Platymitra is a genus of flowering plants belonging to the family Annonaceae.

Its native range is Thailand to Western and Central Malesia.

Species:

- Platymitra arborea (Blanco) P.J.A.Kessler
- Platymitra macrocarpa Boerl.
