= Ophrypetalum =

Conservation status
- Near Threatened (IUCN 3.1)

Scientific classification
- Kingdom: Plantae
- Clade: Embryophytes
- Clade: Tracheophytes
- Clade: Spermatophytes
- Clade: Angiosperms
- Clade: Magnoliids
- Order: Magnoliales
- Family: Annonaceae
- Genus: Ophrypetalum; Diels
- Species: O. odoratum

Binomial name
- Ophrypetalum odoratum Diels

Genus of plant in the soursop family

Ophrypetalum is a genus of plant in the family Annonaceae. It is native to Kenya and Tanzania. It contains a single species, Ophrypetalum odoratum. Ludwig Diels, the German botanist who first formally described the species, named it after the perfumed odor (odōrātus, in Latin) of its flowers. Bioactive molecules isolated from its roots and leaves have been reported to have antifungal activity in tests with Candida albicans.

== Description ==
It is a bush reaching 4 to 5 meters (13 to 16 ft) in height. Its branches have lenticels. Its leaves are 2–12 centimeters (0.8–4.7 in) by 1.2–5.5 centimeters (0.5–2.2 in) and come to a shallow point at their tips. The leaves are green on their upper surface and dull, pale green on their lower surfaces. Its petioles are 5 millimeters long. Each flower is on a hairy pedicel 0.2–2.2 centimeters long. Its flowers have 3 oval-shaped sepals that are 6–9 by 6-9 millimeters. The sepals are smooth on both surfaces and concave . Its 6 petals are arranged in two rows of 3. The outer petals are yellow or brown, with a 3.5-5.5 millimeter long claw at their base and a 3.5–5.5 by 8–10 millimeter blade. The outer petals have delicate hairs on their outer surface and are smooth inside. The inner petals are similarly colored, have a 4–6 by 2.5–3 millimeter claw at their base, and a 4 by 8.5 millimeter blade. The inner petals are very lightly hairy on their outer surface and smooth inside with the exception of a distinctive ridge of brown fleshy bristles at their base. It has numerous stamens that are 0.6-0.8 millimeters long. Its fruit are 5–6.8 by 1.8–2.2 centimeters and have 3 longitudinal ribs. Its seeds are 2.5 by 1.4 centimeters with testa that form wings on either side.

Pollen is shed as permanent tetrads.
