= Sanrafaelia =

Conservation status
- Endangered (IUCN 3.1)

Scientific classification
- Kingdom: Plantae
- Clade: Embryophytes
- Clade: Tracheophytes
- Clade: Spermatophytes
- Clade: Angiosperms
- Clade: Magnoliids
- Order: Magnoliales
- Family: Annonaceae
- Genus: Sanrafaelia; Verdc.
- Species: S. ruffonammari

Binomial name
- Sanrafaelia ruffonammari Verdc.

Genus of plants

Sanrafaelia is a monotypic genus of flowering plants belonging to the family Annonaceae. The only species is Sanrafaelia ruffonammari.

Its native range is the forests of Muheza District of Tanga Region Tanzania.
