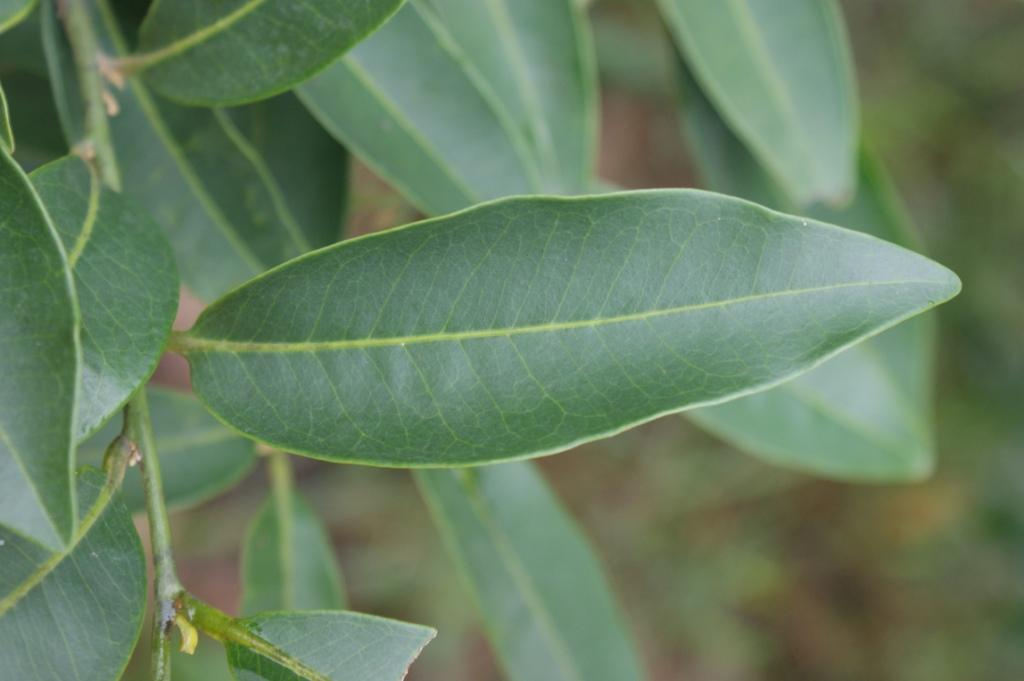
- Cardiopetalum calophyllum leaf

Scientific classification
- Kingdom: Plantae
- Clade: Tracheophytes
- Clade: Angiosperms
- Clade: Magnoliids
- Order: Magnoliales
- Family: Annonaceae
- Genus: Cardiopetalum; Schltdl.

Type species
- Cardiopetalum calophyllum Schltdl.

= Cardiopetalum =

Genus of flowering plants

Cardiopetalum is a genus of flowering plants belonging to the family Annonaceae and native to southern tropical America.

Species:

- Cardiopetalum calophyllum Schltdl.
- Cardiopetalum plicatum N.A.Murray
- Cardiopetalum surinamense R.E.Fr.
