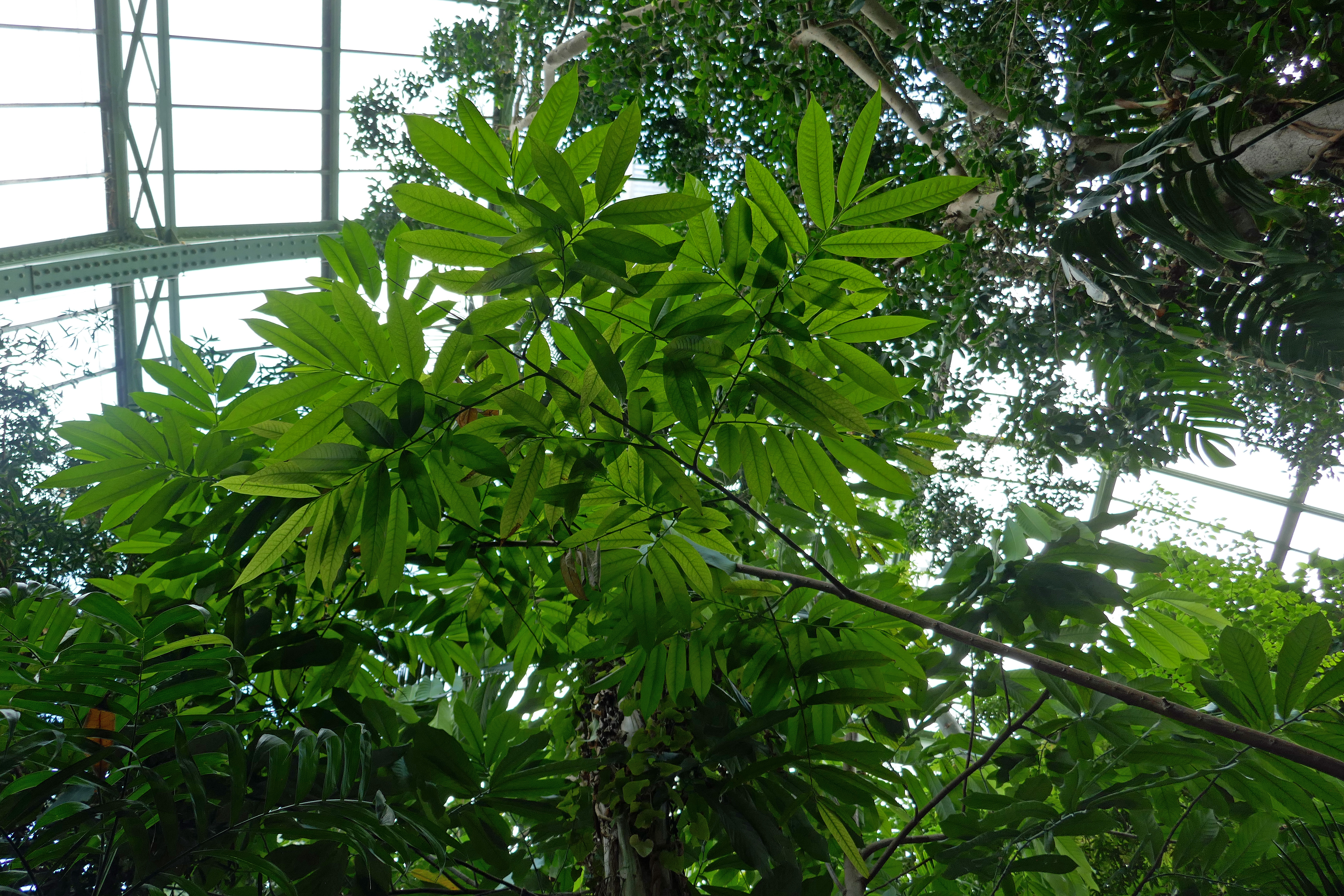
- Cleistopholis patens

Scientific classification
- Kingdom: Plantae
- Clade: Tracheophytes
- Clade: Angiosperms
- Clade: Magnoliids
- Order: Magnoliales
- Family: Annonaceae
- Subfamily: Ambavioideae
- Genus: Cleistopholis; Pierre ex Engl.

= Cleistopholis =

Genus of flowering plants

Cleistopholis is a genus of flowering plants belonging to the family Annonaceae.

Its native range is Western Tropical Africa to Angola.

Species:

- Cleistopholis glauca Pierre ex Engl. & Diels
- Cleistopholis patens (Benth.) Engl. & Diels
- Cleistopholis staudtii (Engl. & Diels) Engl. & Diels
