= Pseudephedranthus =

Scientific classification
- Kingdom: Plantae
- Clade: Tracheophytes
- Clade: Angiosperms
- Clade: Magnoliids
- Order: Magnoliales
- Family: Annonaceae
- Genus: Pseudephedranthus; Aristeg.

Genus of plants

Pseudephedranthus is a genus of flowering plants belonging to the family Annonaceae.

Its native range is Northern South America to Northern Brazil.

Species:

- Pseudephedranthus enigmaticus Maas & Westra
- Pseudephedranthus fragrans (R.E.Fr.) Aristeg.
