= Porcelia =

Scientific classification
- Kingdom: Plantae
- Clade: Tracheophytes
- Clade: Angiosperms
- Clade: Magnoliids
- Order: Magnoliales
- Family: Annonaceae
- Genus: Porcelia; Ruiz & Pav.

Genus of flowering plants

Porcelia is a genus of flowering plants in the family Annonaceae containing at least 19 species of which all are native to Latin America.

== Species ==
- Porcelia macrocarpa R.E. Fr.
- Porcelia magnifructa R.E. Fr.
- Porcelia mediocris N.A. Murray
- Porcelia nitidifolia Ruiz & Pav.
- Porcelia ponderosa Rusby
- Porcelia steinbachii R.E. Fr.
- Porcelia venezuelanensis Pittier

== Taxonomy ==
The genus was first described by Ruiz & Pav. and published in 'Florae Peruvianae, et Chilensis Prodromus 84, t. 16. 1794'.
