= Dielsiothamnus =

Conservation status
- Least Concern (IUCN 3.1)

Scientific classification
- Kingdom: Plantae
- Clade: Embryophytes
- Clade: Tracheophytes
- Clade: Spermatophytes
- Clade: Angiosperms
- Clade: Magnoliids
- Order: Magnoliales
- Family: Annonaceae
- Genus: Dielsiothamnus; R.E.Fr.
- Species: D. divaricatus

Binomial name
- Dielsiothamnus divaricatus (Diels) R.E.Fr.

Synonyms
- Uvaria divaricata Diels

Genus of plants

Dielsiothamnus is a monotypic genus of flowering plants belonging to the family Annonaceae. The only species is Dielsiothamnus divaricatus. It a scrambling shrub or tree native to Malawi, northern Mozambique, and southern Tanzania.
