= Tridimeris =

Scientific classification
- Kingdom: Plantae
- Clade: Tracheophytes
- Clade: Angiosperms
- Clade: Magnoliids
- Order: Magnoliales
- Family: Annonaceae
- Genus: Tridimeris; Baill.

Genus of flowering plants

Tridimeris is a genus of flowering plants belonging to the family Annonaceae.

Its native range is Mexico.

Species:

- Tridimeris chiapensis M.A.Escobar & Ortíz-Rodr.
- Tridimeris hahniana Baill.
