= Monocyclanthus =

Conservation status
- Vulnerable (IUCN 3.1)

Scientific classification
- Kingdom: Plantae
- Clade: Embryophytes
- Clade: Tracheophytes
- Clade: Spermatophytes
- Clade: Angiosperms
- Clade: Magnoliids
- Order: Magnoliales
- Family: Annonaceae
- Genus: Monocyclanthus; Keay
- Species: M. vignei

Binomial name
- Monocyclanthus vignei Keay

Genus of flowering plants

Monocyclanthus is a monotypic genus of flowering plants in the family Annonaceae containing the single species Monocyclanthus vignei. It is a tree native to Ghana and Liberia. It is a rare plant of the understory of wet evergreen forest habitat.

Monocyclanthus and Monocyclanthus vignei were first described in 1953 by Keay.

== Description ==
It is distinguished from plants in the genus, Uvaria, by the single whorl of petals being valvate, and from Isolona, by both the carpels and the petals being free. The flowers are cauliflorous, that is, they flower on the trunk (or major branches).

== Threats ==
It is threatened by ecosystem conversion and degradation, from mining, quarrying, logging and wood-harvesting.
