= Lettowianthus =

Conservation status
- Least Concern (IUCN 3.1)

Scientific classification
- Kingdom: Plantae
- Clade: Embryophytes
- Clade: Tracheophytes
- Clade: Spermatophytes
- Clade: Angiosperms
- Clade: Magnoliids
- Order: Magnoliales
- Family: Annonaceae
- Genus: Lettowianthus; Diels
- Species: L. stellatus

Binomial name
- Lettowianthus stellatus Diels

Genus of plants

Lettowianthus is a genus of flowering plant in family Annonaceae. It contains a single species, Lettowianthus stellatus, a tree found in Kenya and Tanzania.
