= Dennettia =

Conservation status
- Least Concern (IUCN 3.1)

Scientific classification
- Kingdom: Plantae
- Clade: Embryophytes
- Clade: Tracheophytes
- Clade: Angiosperms
- Clade: Magnoliids
- Order: Magnoliales
- Family: Annonaceae
- Genus: Dennettia; Baker f. (1913)
- Species: D. tripetala

Binomial name
- Dennettia tripetala (Baker f.)

Synonyms
- Uvariopsis tripetala (Baker f.) G.E.Schatz (2003)

Species of flowering plant

Dennettia is a monotypic genus (i.e. a genus containing a single species) of plants in the custard apple family Annonaceae. The sole included species is Dennettia tripetala, a shrub or tree native to western and west-central tropical Africa, including Guinea, Sierra Leone, Ghana, Nigeria, and Cameroon. It is threatened by habitat loss.

== Nomenclature ==
D. tripetala is known colloquially in English as the pepper fruit. It is also called mmimmi by the Igbo, ata igebere or igberi by the Yoruba, imako by the Niger Deltans and Urhobo, ako by residents of Benin and nkarika by the Efik.

== Description ==
Three broad green sepals and golden fleshy petals make up the pepper fruit. The oblong-shaped leaves alternate one on top of the other and taper at the tip.

== Uses ==
The leaves of D. tripetala may be dried and kept for a very long time without succumbing to microbial growth. U. tripetala fruits can be used as food and herbs to make herbal remedies, according to Okwu and Morah. The pepper fruit's fruits, leaves, and roots are all used in traditional medicine preparations.

=== Food ===
Essential oils and volatile oils are both present in pepper fruit. This fruit's volatile and essential (oleoresin) oils, which make up a significant portion of its composition, give it flavor, aroma, and pungency. In the eastern portion of Nigeria, it is typically offered with palm wine, garden eggs, bitter kola, and kola nuts for festivals, ceremonials, coronations, traditional weddings, naming rituals, new yam festivities, and other occasions. According to Keay (1989), when chewed, pepper fruit has an extremely peppery flavor. When people chew this peppery food, they frequently feel stimulated.

The fruit of the D. tripetala can be used to season and flavor a variety of foods, including white soup, spicy fish, hot drinks, alcoholic beverages, beverages, meat, vegetables, stew, sauces, and sausages. investigated the viability of utilizing the pepper fruit in place of ginger while making zobo drinks. According to their research, pepper fruit can effectively replace ginger in the preparation of zobo drinks.

==== Nutritional value ====
D. tripetala contains 0.42% magnesium, 1.80% calcium, 2.50% potassium, 9.84% crude fibers, 15.31% crude protein, 8.0% moisture, 62% carbohydrate, 3.47% crude lipids, and 0.33% phosphorus, as well as trace amounts of cadmium, iron, zinc, and copper, according to Okwu and Morah's 2004 study. Water-soluble vitamins like niacin, ascorbic acid, riboflavin, and thiamine are also present in pepper fruit.

=== Medicinal ===
Pepper fruit find wide use among traditional remedies in West Africa. Health claims that have been researched include:

- Postnatal care: Achinewhu et al. (1995), investigated the use of pepper fruit seeds in food given to new mothers to help the uterus contract.
- Anti-inflammatory: Oyemitan et al., investigated the pepper fruit's essential oil for its analgesic and anti-inflammatory characteristics.
- Antimicrobial: Aderogba et al. investigated the antimicrobial properties of U. tripetala.
- Glaucoma: Timothy and Okere researched the use of pepper fruit to lower intraocular pressure (IOP) in glaucoma patients.
