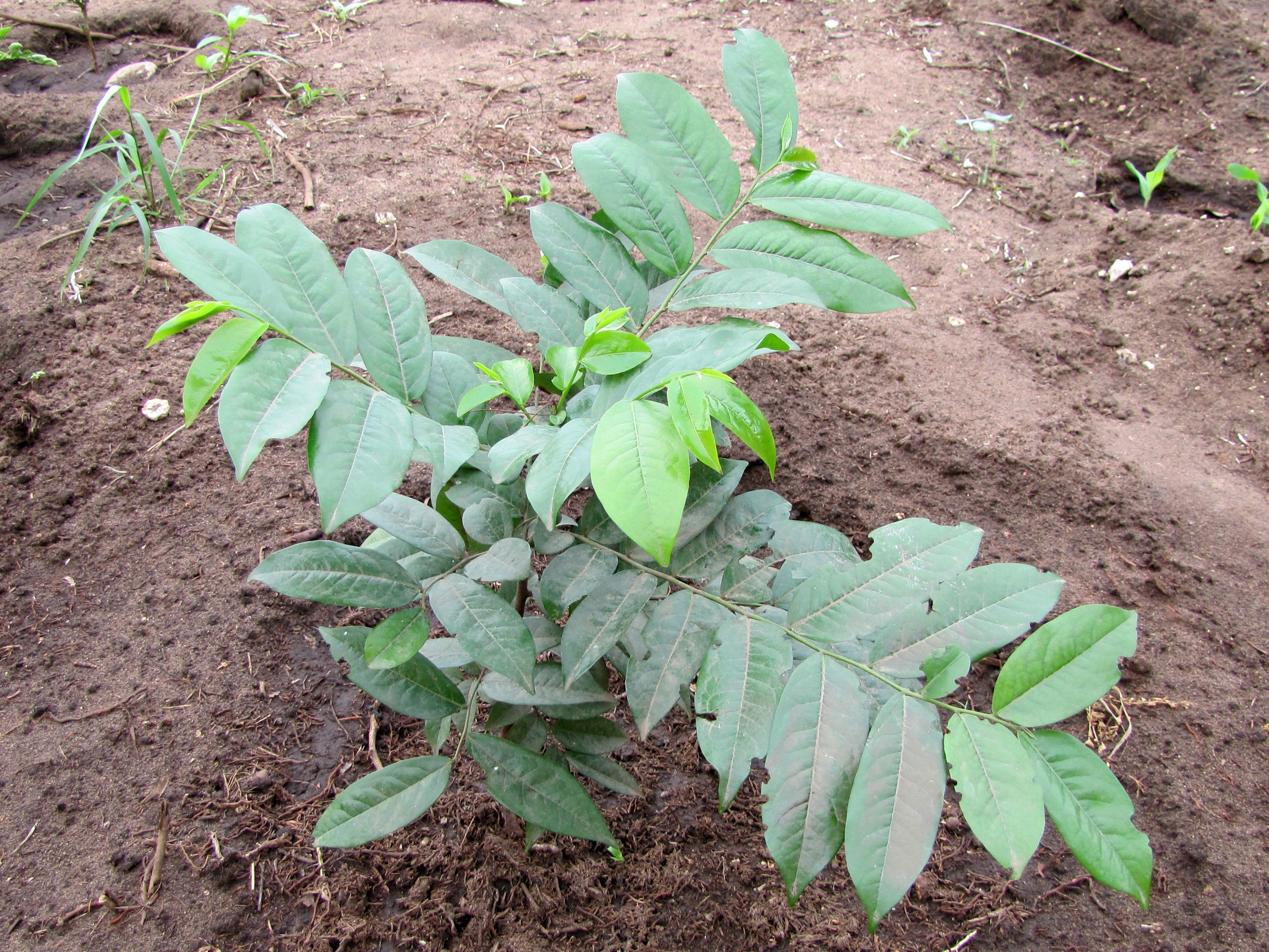

Conservation status
- Vulnerable (IUCN 3.1)

Scientific classification
- Kingdom: Plantae
- Clade: Embryophytes
- Clade: Tracheophytes
- Clade: Spermatophytes
- Clade: Angiosperms
- Clade: Magnoliids
- Order: Magnoliales
- Family: Annonaceae
- Genus: Mkilua; Verdc.
- Species: M. fragrans

Binomial name
- Mkilua fragrans Verdc.

= Mkilua =

Species of plant in the soursop family

Mkilua is a genus of plant in the family Annonaceae. It is native to Kenya and Tanzania. It contains a single species, Mkilua fragrans. Bernard Verdcourt, the British botanist who first formally described the species, named it after the fragrance (frāgrāns in Latin) of its flowers which smell like lemon. It is commonly called Mkilua Mwitu, Kilua and Kiluwa in Swahili, and Kingade in Digo (and Swahili). Volatile oils extracted from its leaves, flowers, and aerial parts have been reported to be repellent to Anopheles gambiae mosquitoes which are vectors for the malaria parasite Plasmodium falciparum. Bioactive molecules extracted from its roots have been reported to have antimicrobial activity in tests with Streptococcus agalactiae and Staphylococcus aureus.

== Description ==
It is a tree reaching 2.7–4.5 meters (8.9–14.8 ft) in height. Its leaves are 1.7–14 cm (0.7–5.5 in) by 0.7–7 cm (0.3–2.8 in) with blunt tips. The leaves are smooth on their upper surfaces while their undersides are hairy when young, but become smooth when mature. Its petioles are 1–2 millimeters long. Its flowers are solitary or grouped in cymes of 2–3. Each flower is on a pedicel 2.4 centimeters long. Its 3 sepals are 4–6 by 4–7 millimeters. Its 6 petals are arranged in two rows of 3. The young petals are green, developing into white or cream colors with reddish-purple highlights at their base. The outer petals are 2.1–3.5 by 1.2–2.3 centimeters. The inner petals are 1.9 by 0.9–1.1 centimeters and hairy. Its orange stamens are 2–2.7 millimeters long. The flowers have 30–40 carpels. Pollen is shed as permanent tetrads.
