= Pseudartabotrys =

Scientific classification
- Kingdom: Plantae
- Clade: Tracheophytes
- Clade: Angiosperms
- Clade: Magnoliids
- Order: Magnoliales
- Family: Annonaceae
- Genus: Pseudartabotrys; Pellegr.
- Species: P. letestui

Binomial name
- Pseudartabotrys letestui Pellegr.

Genus of plants

Pseudartabotrys is a monotypic genus of flowering plants belonging to the family Annonaceae. The only species is Pseudartabotrys letestui.

It is endemic to Gabon in west-central tropical Africa.
