= Cleistochlamys =

Scientific classification
- Kingdom: Plantae
- Clade: Tracheophytes
- Clade: Angiosperms
- Clade: Magnoliids
- Order: Magnoliales
- Family: Annonaceae
- Genus: Cleistochlamys; Oliv.

Genus of flowering plants

Cleistochlamys is a genus of flowering plants belonging to the family Annonaceae.

Its native range is Eastern and Southern Tropical Africa.

Species:

- Cleistochlamys kirkii (Benth.) Oliv.
