= Monocarpia =

Scientific classification
- Kingdom: Plantae
- Clade: Tracheophytes
- Clade: Angiosperms
- Clade: Magnoliids
- Order: Magnoliales
- Family: Annonaceae
- Subfamily: Malmeoideae
- Tribe: Monocarpieae
- Genus: Monocarpia; Miq., 1865

Genus of trees

Monocarpia is an Asian tree genus in the family Annonaceae and the tribe Monocarpieae. Its native range is Borneo, peninsular Malaysia and Sumatera.

== Species ==
Plants of the World Online currently includes:

- Monocarpia borneensis Mols & Kessler
- Monocarpia euneura Miq. - type species
- Monocarpia kalimantanensis P.J.A.Kessler
- Monocarpia maingayi (Hook.f. & Thomson) I.M.Turner
