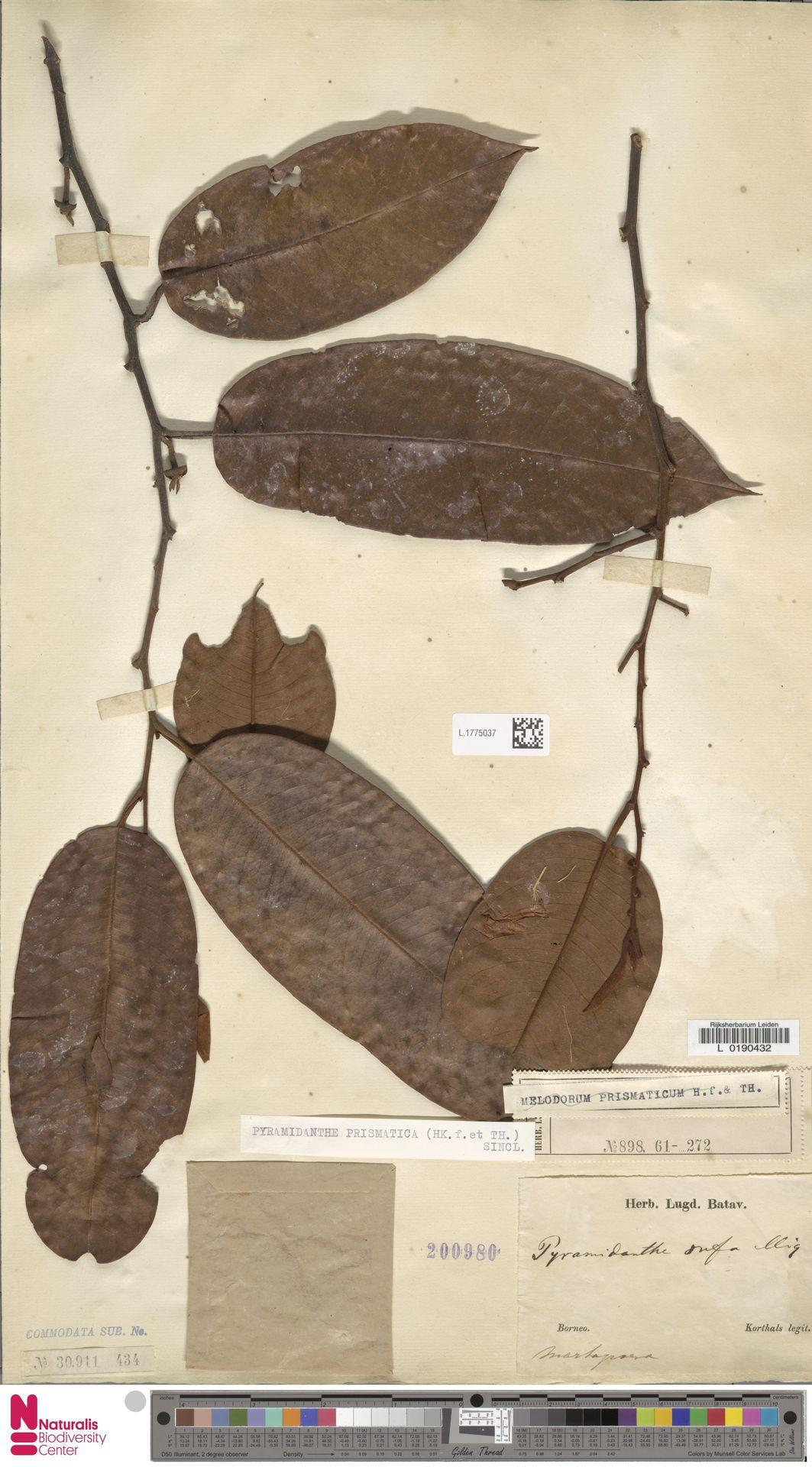
- Pyramidanthe rufa Miq. (type of) - Pyramidanthe prismatica (Hook.f. and Thomson) J.Sinclair (species)

Scientific classification
- Kingdom: Plantae
- Clade: Tracheophytes
- Clade: Angiosperms
- Clade: Magnoliids
- Order: Magnoliales
- Family: Annonaceae
- Genus: Pyramidanthe; Miq. (1865)

Synonyms
- Mitrella Miq. (1865)

= Pyramidanthe =

Genus of plants

Pyramidanthe is a genus of flowering plants belonging to the family Annonaceae. It includes 12 species native to western Malesia (Peninsular Malaysia, Sumatra, Java, and Borneo), New Guinea, and the Northern Territory of Australia.

== Species ==
12 species are accepted.

- Pyramidanthe beccarii (Scheff.) Bangk. & Chaowasku – New Guinea
- Pyramidanthe clementis (Merr.) Bangk. & Chaowasku – Borneo
- Pyramidanthe cylindrica (Maingay ex Hook.f. & Thomson) Bangk. & Chaowasku – Peninsular Malaysia
- Pyramidanthe dielsii (J.Sinclair) Bangk. & Chaowasku – northwestern Borneo
- Pyramidanthe elegans (Hook.f. & Thomson) Bangk. & Chaowasku – southern Thailand and Peninsular Malaysia
- Pyramidanthe kentii (Blume) Bangk. & Chaowasku – Borneo, Java, and Peninsular Malaysia
- Pyramidanthe ledermannii (Diels) Bangk. & Chaowasku – New Guinea
- Pyramidanthe mabiformis (Griff.) Bangk. & Chaowasku – Peninsular Malaysia
- Pyramidanthe prismatica (Hook.f. & Thomson) Merr. – Peninsular Thailand, Peninsular Malaysia, Sumatra, and Borneo
- Pyramidanthe schlechteri (Diels) Bangk. & Chaowasku – New Guinea
- Pyramidanthe silvatica (Diels) Bangk. & Chaowasku – New Guinea
- Pyramidanthe tiwiensis (Jessup & Bygrave) Bangk. & Chaowasku – Northern Territory (Tiwi Islands)
