= Ephedranthus =

Scientific classification
- Kingdom: Plantae
- Clade: Tracheophytes
- Clade: Angiosperms
- Clade: Magnoliids
- Order: Magnoliales
- Family: Annonaceae
- Genus: Ephedranthus; S.Moore

Genus of plants

Ephedranthus is a genus of flowering plants belonging to the family Annonaceae.

Its native range is Southern Tropical America.

== Species ==
Accepted species include:

- Ephedranthus amazonicus R.E.Fr.
- Ephedranthus boliviensis Chatrou & Pirie
- Ephedranthus columbianus Maas & Setten
- Ephedranthus dimerus J.C.Lopes, Chatrou & Mello-Silva
- Ephedranthus guianensis R.E.Fr.
- Ephedranthus parviflorus S.Moore
- Ephedranthus pisocarpus R.E.Fr.
