= Boreotropical flora =

Boreotropical flora were plants that may have formed a belt of vegetation around the Northern Hemisphere during the Eocene epoch. These included forests composed of large, fast-growing trees (such as dawn redwoods) as far north as 80°N.

== See also ==
- Paleocene-Eocene Thermal Maximum
