= Mwasumbia =

Conservation status
- Vulnerable (IUCN 3.1)

Scientific classification
- Kingdom: Plantae
- Clade: Embryophytes
- Clade: Tracheophytes
- Clade: Spermatophytes
- Clade: Angiosperms
- Clade: Magnoliids
- Order: Magnoliales
- Family: Annonaceae
- Genus: Mwasumbia; Couvreur & D.M.Johnson
- Species: M. alba

Binomial name
- Mwasumbia alba Couvreur & D.M.Johnson

Genus of plants

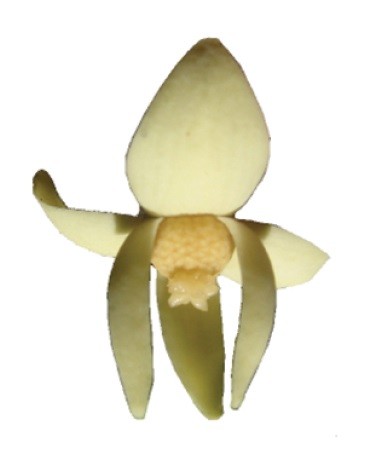
Mwasumbia alba flower

Mwasumbia is a monotypic genus of flowering plants belonging to the family Annonaceae. The only known species is Mwasumbia alba.

It is native to Tanzania.

The genus name of Mwasumbia is in honour of Leonard B. Mwasumbi (b.1938), a Tanzanian botanist, plant taxonomist, specialist in Tanzanian flora, and former head of the Herbarium at the University of Dar es Salaam.

The genus was circumscribed by Thomas Louis Pierre Couvreur and David Mark Johnson in Syst. Bot. vol.34 (Issue 2) on page 268 and 270 in 2009.

The Latin specific epithet alba (of the species) means “white”, referring to the white flowers.
