= Drepananthus =

Scientific classification
- Kingdom: Plantae
- Clade: Tracheophytes
- Clade: Angiosperms
- Clade: Magnoliids
- Order: Magnoliales
- Family: Annonaceae
- Subfamily: Ambavioideae
- Genus: Drepananthus; Maingay ex Hook.f. & Thomson

Genus of flowering plants

Drepananthus is a genus of flowering plants belonging to the family Annonaceae.

Its native range is Vietnam to Papuasia, Fiji.

Species:

- Drepananthus acuminatus (C.B.Rob.) Survesw. & R.M.K.Saunders
- Drepananthus angustipetalus (R.J.Wang & R.M.K.Saunders) Survesw. & R.M.K.Saunders
- Drepananthus apoensis Elmer
- Drepananthus biovulatus (Boerl.) Survesw. & R.M.K.Saunders
- Drepananthus carinatus Ridl.
- Drepananthus cauliflorus (K.Schum. & Lauterb.) Survesw. & R.M.K.Saunders
- Drepananthus crassipetalus (R.J.Wang & R.M.K.Saunders) Survesw. & R.M.K.Saunders
- Drepananthus deltoideus (Airy Shaw) Survesw. & R.M.K.Saunders
- Drepananthus filiformis (Jovet-Ast) Bân
- Drepananthus havilandii (Boerl.) Survesw. & R.M.K.Saunders
- Drepananthus hexagynus (Miq.) Survesw. & R.M.K.Saunders
- Drepananthus kingii (Boerl. ex Koord.-Schum.) Survesw. & R.M.K.Saunders
- Drepananthus lucidus (Diels) Survesw. & R.M.K.Saunders
- Drepananthus magnificus (Diels) Survesw. & R.M.K.Saunders
- Drepananthus minahassae (Koord.) Survesw. & R.M.K.Saunders
- Drepananthus novoguineensis (Baker f.) I.M.Turner & Utteridge
- Drepananthus obtusifolius (Becc. & Scheff.) Survesw. & R.M.K.Saunders
- Drepananthus olivaceus (King) Survesw. & R.M.K.Saunders
- Drepananthus pahangensis M.R.Hend.
- Drepananthus petiolatus (Diels) Survesw. & R.M.K.Saunders
- Drepananthus polycarpus (C.T.White & W.D.Francis) Survesw. & R.M.K.Saunders
- Drepananthus prunifer Maingay ex Hook.f. & Thomson
- Drepananthus pubescens (Scheff.) Survesw. & R.M.K.Saunders
- Drepananthus ramuliflorus Maingay ex Hook.f. & Thomson
- Drepananthus ridleyi (King) Survesw. & R.M.K.Saunders
- Drepananthus samarensis (R.J.Wang & R.M.K.Saunders) Survesw. & R.M.K.Saunders
- Drepananthus vitiensis (A.C.Sm.) Survesw. & R.M.K.Saunders
