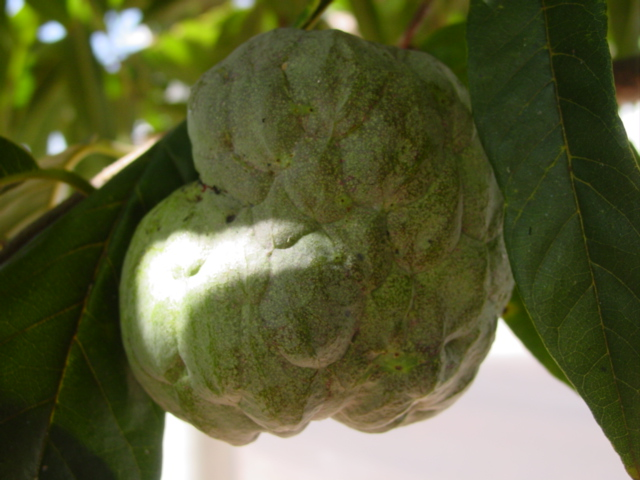
- Annona squamosa fruit

Scientific classification
- Kingdom: Plantae
- Clade: Tracheophytes
- Clade: Angiosperms
- Clade: Magnoliids
- Order: Magnoliales
- Family: Annonaceae; Juss.

Type genus
- Annona

Subfamilies
- Anaxagoreoideae Chatrou et al. 2012; Ambavioideae Chatrou et al. 2012; Malmeoideae Couvreur et al. 2012; Annonoideae Rafinesque 1815

Synonyms
- Hornschuchiaceae J. Agardh; Monodoraceae J. Agardh

= Annonaceae =

Annonaceae Temporal range: Coniacian - recent

Family of flowering plants

The Annonaceae are a family of flowering plants consisting of trees, shrubs, or rarely lianas commonly known as the custard apple family or soursop family. With 108 accepted genera and about 2400 known species, it is the largest family in the Magnoliales. Several genera produce edible fruit, most notably Annona, Anonidium, Asimina, Rollinia, and Uvaria. Its type genus is Annona. The family is concentrated in the tropics, with the only temperate genus being Asimina. Other than Asimina, 900 species are Neotropical, 450 are Afrotropical, and the remaining are Indomalayan.

== Description ==
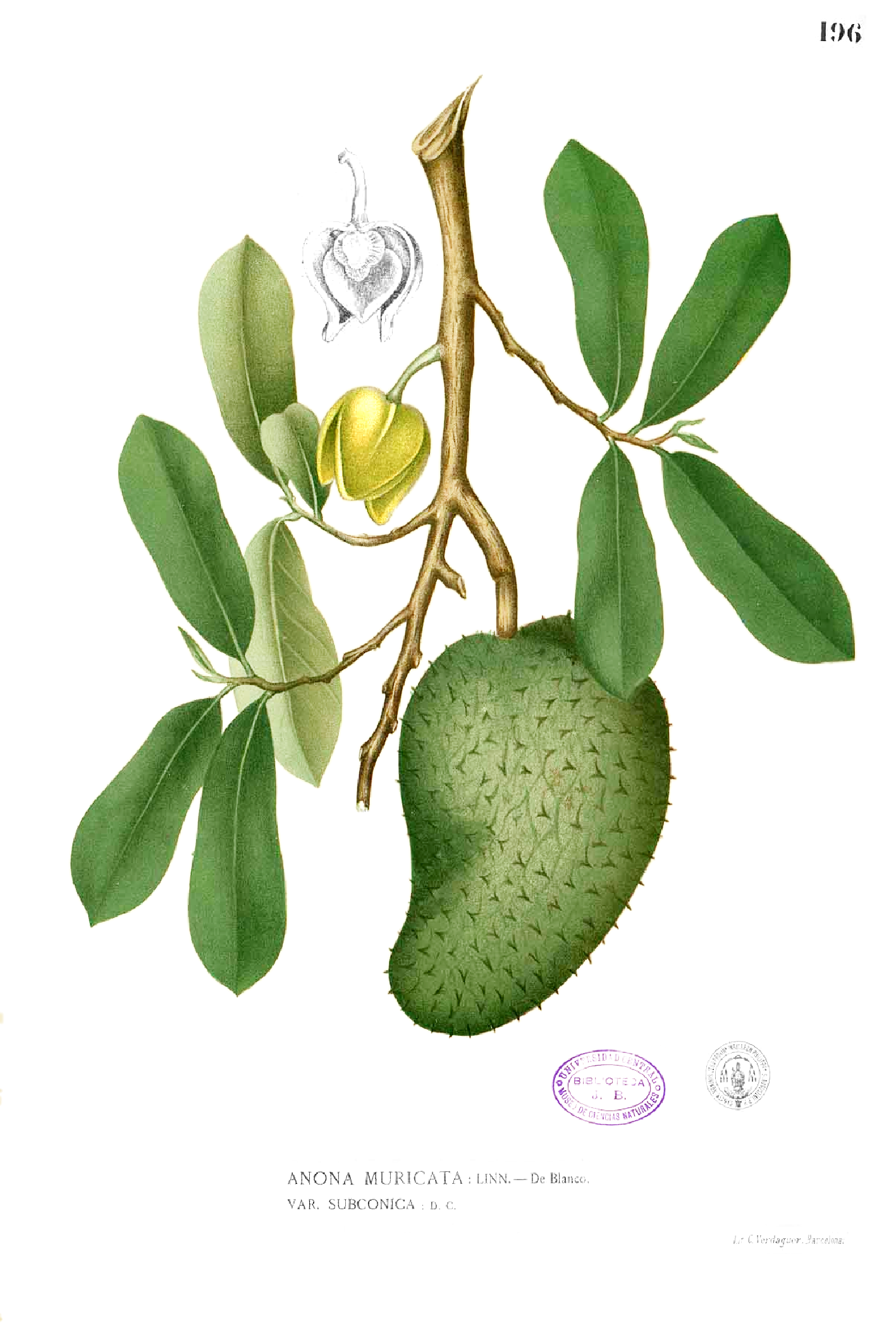
Annona muricata

The species are mostly tropical, some are mid-latitude, deciduous or evergreen trees and shrubs, with some lianas, with aromatic bark, leaves, and flowers.

Stems, stalks and leaves
Bark is fibrous and aromatic. Pith septate (fine tangential bands divided by partitions) to diaphragmed (divided by thin partitions with openings in them). Branching distichous (arranged in two rows/on one plane) or spiral. Leaves are alternate, two-ranked, simple, pinnately veined, and have leaf stalks. Stipules absent.

Flowers
Flower stalks are axillary to (on the opposite side of shoot from) leaf scars on old wood and sometimes from leaves on new shoots. The flowers are usually trimerous; borne singly or in compound inflorescences; bisexual and rarely unisexual. The receptacle might become enlarged, elevated or flat. The outer whorls are inserted below the ovaries, and have valvate (overlapping) or imbricate (nonoverlapping) segments. Usually two to four persistent sepals that are distinct or connate (fused) at the base. Six petals in two unequal whorls of three with larger outer whorls and fleshier inner whorls that might share the same nectar glands, or six to fifteen petals, with impressed veins on their inner face. Ten to twenty (or many more) stamens inserted below the ovary, spirally arranged and forming a ball or flat-topped mass with short and stout filaments and linear to oblong anthers which face outward and open longitudinally. Each flower can have from one to many pistils, distinct to connate, with stigmas distinct. Marginal placentation, each pistil bearing one locule, with one to many ovules. Style short and thick, with terminal stigma.

Fruits and seeds
Fruits are single berries or coalesce from several pistils (into aggregate fruit, syncarps). Seeds are one to many per pistil; have a fleshy and usually brightly colored cover, have ruminate endosperm (nutritive tissue surrounding the embryo) and are oily.

== Systematics ==
Monophyly and inter-familial systematics have been well supported for Annonaceae by a combination of morphological and molecular evidence. The APG II system places Annonaceae as most closely related to the small Magnoliid family Eupomatiaceae.

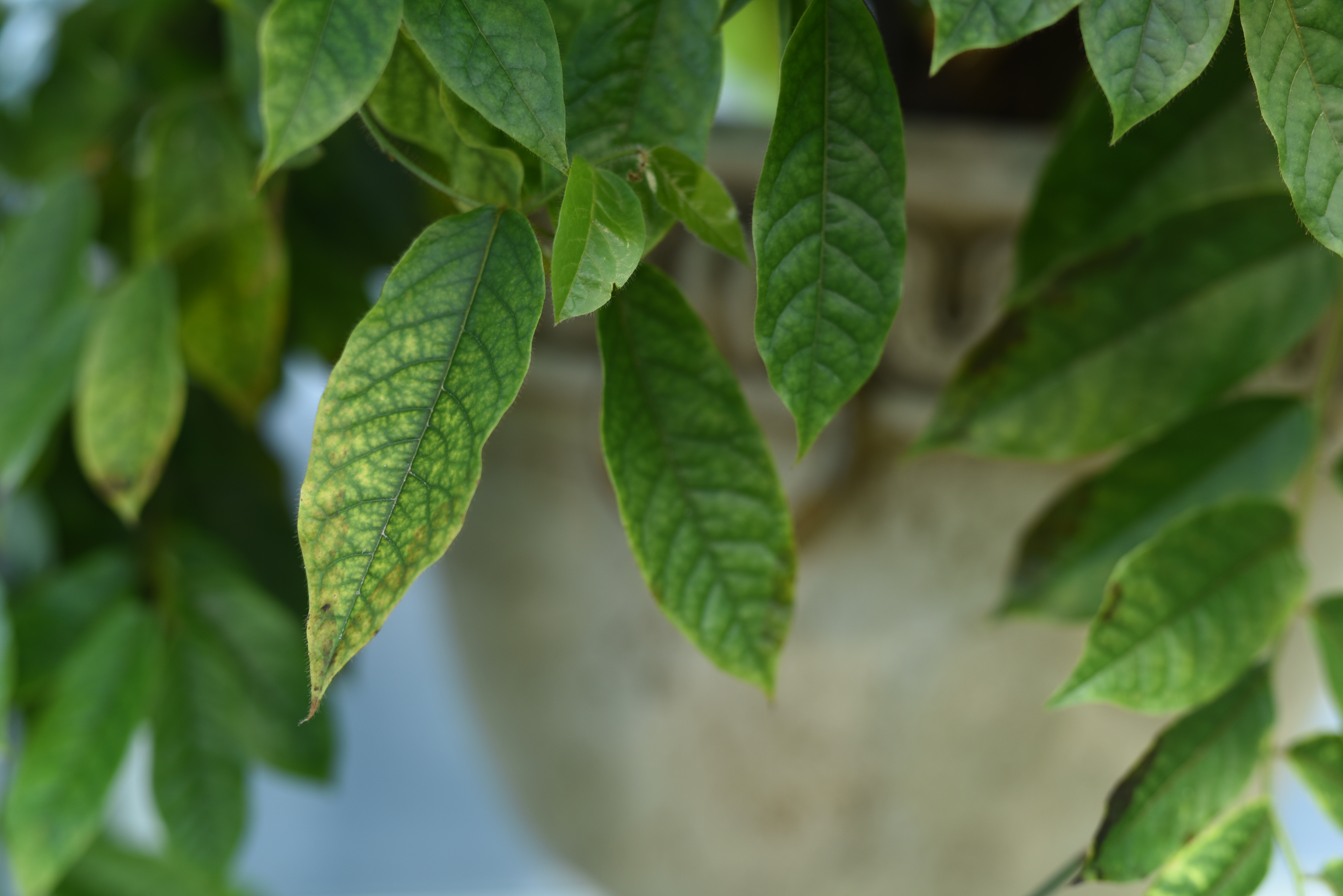
Uvaria ovata

- Magnoliidae
  - - Canellales
    - Piperales
  - - - Magnoliales
        - Myristicaceae
        - - Magnoliaceae
          - - - Degeneriaceae
              - Himantandraceae
            - - Eupomatiaceae
              - Annonaceae
    - Laurales

- Annonaceae
  - Anaxagoreoideae
    Anaxagorea
  - - Ambavioideae
    - - Annonoideae
        - Bocageeae
        - - Guatterieae
          - - - Duguetieae
              - Xylopieae
            - - Annoneae
              - - Monodoreae
                - Uvarieae
      - Malmeoideae
        - Piptostigmateae
        - - Malmeeae
          - - Maasieae
            - - Fenerivieae
              - - Phoenicantheae
                - - Dendrokingstonieae
                  - - Monocarpieae
                    - Miliuseae

In a phylogeny-based reclassification of the family, four subfamilies are recognised: Anaxagoreoideae (including just Anaxagorea), Ambavioideae, Annonoideae, and Malmeoideae. A number of the larger genera, including Guatteria, with its 177 species, Annona, and Xylopia, belong to Annonoideae. Together, Annonoideae and Malmeoideae comprise the majority of the species and each are further subdivided into a number of tribes. The subfamilial and tribal classification is followed in World Annonaceae which presents an overview of all Annonaceae genera and taxonomic, distribution and photographic information for a large number of species. Keys for the identification of Annonaceae genera (separately for Neotropical, African/Madagascan, and Asian/Australian taxa) are presented in: For a concise bibliographic overview of the taxonomic literature (1900 to 2012) see:

Both plastid DNA markers and morphological characters provide evidence that Anaxagorea is the sister clade to the rest of the family. This may confirm the hypothesis that morphological traits shared between Anaxagorea and other Magnoliales species (such as 2-ranked phyllotaxis, monosulcate pollen, and laminate stamens) represent ancestral characters, while derived characters observed in other genera have evolved independently multiple times. The oldest fossil evidence of Annonaceae is described as the genus Futabanthus, from the Late Cretaceous (Coniacian) of Japan, which represents a minimum age of c. 89 million years ago for the most recent common ancestor (crown group) of the family. The ages of Annonaceae clades inferred using fossil evidence and molecular clock–based dating techniques suggests that the pantropical distribution of the family originated subsequent to the break-up of the Gondwanan supercontinent, as the result of a combination of geodispersal tracking the expansion of the boreotropical flora during the Eocene and more recent long-distance dispersal events.

=== Taxonomic revisions within the subfamily Malmeoideae ===
==== Reclassification and establishment of Huberantha ====
The genus Huberantha (synonym Hubera) was resolved to be sister to Miliusa, with certain species previously under Polyalthia being additionally reclassified. This reclassification was highly supported by maximum parsimony, Bayesian analysis, and morphological characters. Hubera is characterized by reticulate tertiary venation, axillary inflorescences, 1 ovule per ovary, seeds with flat to slightly raised raphes, and other characters. Huberantha's phylogenetic distance and morphological difference from Monoon and Polyalthia, distinguish Huberantha on the generic level. Morphologically, Huberantha has a finely and densely granular infratectum whereas Monoon and Polyalthia have columellate or densely granular infratecta.

==== Controversy over Stelechocarpus/Winitia ====
It was proposed that the genus Stelechocarpus, which includes S. burahol and S. cauliflorus be reclassified under a new genus Winitia, which is characterized by mixed flowers, multicolumellar stigmas, and columellate/coarsely granular infratectum. This genus was created after phylogenetic analysis that highly supported an unclassified species from Thailand being sister to S. cauliflorus as a monophyletic group. However this is no longer accepted.

==== Reclassification of Annickia as tribe Annickieae ====
The genus Annickia was previously included within the tribe Piptostigmateae. However, it is highly supported to being sister to the rest of the Malmeoideae tribes, and weakly supported to being sister to the rest of the Piptostigmateae genera. For these reasons, Annickia is now classified within its own tribe in the Malmeoideae, the Annickieae.

== Subfamilies ==
The taxonomy of the Annonaceae is based on the Angiosperm Phylogeny Website, which recognises four subfamilies and the extinct genus †Anonaspermum.

=== Anaxagoreoideae ===
Auth.: Chatrou et al. 2012 (monotypic)

- Anaxagorea St.-Hilaire 1825

=== Ambavioideae ===
Auth.: Chatrou et al. 2012

- Ambavia Le Thomas
- Cananga (DC.) Hook.f. & Thomson (ylang-ylang)
- Cleistopholis Pierre ex Engl.
- Cyathocalyx Champ. ex Hook.f. & Thomson
- Drepananthus Maingay ex Hook.f.
- Lettowianthus Diels
- Meiocarpidium Engl. & Diels
- Mezzettia Becc.
- Tetrameranthus R.E.Fr.

=== Annonoideae ===
Auth. Rafinesque, 1815

- Tribe Annoneae Endlicher 1839
  - Annona L. (synonym Rollinia A.St.-Hil.)
  - Anonidium Engl. & Diels
  - Asimina Adans.
  - Diclinanona Diels
  - Disepalum Hook. f.
  - Goniothalamus (Blume) Hook.f. & Thomson
  - Neostenanthera Exell (syn. Boutiquea Le Thomas)
- Tribe Bocageeae Endlicher 1839
  - Bocagea A.St.-Hil.
  - Cardiopetalum Schltdl.
  - Cymbopetalum Benth.
  - Froesiodendron R.E.Fr.
  - Hornschuchia Nees
  - Mkilua Verdc.
  - Porcelia Ruiz & Pav.
  - Trigynaea Schltdl.
- Tribe Duguetieae Chatrou & Saunders 2012
  - Duckeanthus R.E.Fr.
  - Duguetia A.St.-Hil.
  - Fusaea (Baill.) Saff.
  - Letestudoxa Pellegr.
  - Pseudartabotrys Pellegr.
- Tribe Guatterieae Hooker & Thomson 1855
  - Guatteria Ruiz & Pav.
- Tribe Monodoreae Baill. 1868
  - Asteranthe Engl. & Diels
  - Dennettia Baker f.
  - Hexalobus A.DC.
  - Isolona Engl.
  - Lukea Cheek & Gosline
  - Mischogyne Exell
  - Monocyclanthus Keay
  - Monodora Dunal
  - Uvariastrum Engl.
  - Uvariodendron (Engl. & Diels) R.E.Fr.
  - Uvariopsis Engl.
- Tribe Ophrypetaleae Dagallier & Couvreur
  - Ophrypetalum Diels
  - Sanrafaelia Verdc.
- Tribe Uvarieae Hooker & Thomson 1855
  - Afroguatteria Boutique
  - Cleistochlamys Oliv.
  - Dasymaschalon (Hook.f. & Thomson) Dalla Torre & Harms
  - Desmos Lour.
  - Dielsiothamnus R.E.Fr.
  - Fissistigma Griff.
  - Friesodielsia Steenis
  - Monanthotaxis Baill.
  - Pyramidanthe Miq. (synonym Mitrella Miq.)
  - Sphaerocoryne (Boerl.) Ridl.
  - Toussaintia Boutique
  - Uvaria L. (synonyms Balonga Le Thomas and Melodorum Lour.)
- Tribe Xylopieae Endlicher 1839
  - Artabotrys R.Br.
  - Xylopia L.

=== Malmeoideae ===
- Tribe Annickieae Couvreur et al., 2019 (monotypic)
  - Annickia Setten & Maas
- Tribe Piptostigmateae Chatrou & Saunders 2012
  - Brieya De Wild.
  - Greenwayodendron Verdc.
  - Mwasumbia Couvreur & D.M. Johnson
  - Piptostigma Oliv.
  - Polyceratocarpus Engl. & Diels
  - Sirdavidia Couvreur
- Tribe Malmeeae Chatrou & Saunders 2012
  - Bocageopsis R.E.Fr.
  - Cremastosperma R.E.Fr.
  - Ephedranthus S.Moore
  - Klarobelia Chatrou
  - Malmea R.E.Fr.
  - Mosannona Chatrou
  - Onychopetalum R.E.Fr.
  - Oxandra A.Rich. (black lancewood)
  - Pseudephedranthus Aristeg.
  - Pseudomalmea Chatrou
  - Pseudoxandra R.E.Fr.
  - Ruizodendron R.E.Fr.
  - Unonopsis R.E.Fr.
- Tribe Maasieae Chatrou & Saunders 2012 (monotypic)
  - Maasia Mols et al.
- Tribe Fenerivieae Chatrou & Saunders 2012 (monotypic)
  - Fenerivia Diels
- Tribe Phoenicantheae (monotypic)
  - Phoenicanthus Alston
- Tribe Dendrokingstonieae Chatrou & Saunders 2012 (monotypic)
  - Dendrokingstonia Rauschert
- Tribe Monocarpieae Chatrou & Saunders 2012
  - Monocarpia Miq.
  - Leoheo Chaowasku
- Tribe Miliuseae Hooker & Thomson 1855
  - Alphonsea Hook.f. & Thomson
  - Desmopsis Saff.
  - Huberantha (synonym Hubera) Chaowasku
  - Marsypopetalum Scheff.
  - Meiogyne Miq. (synonyms: Ancana F. Mueller; Guamia Merrill; Fitzalania F. Muell.; Oncodostigma Diels, Polyaulax Backer)
  - Miliusa Lesch. ex A.DC. (Saccopetalum Bennett)
  - Mitrephora (Blume) Hook.f. & Thomson
  - Monoon Miq. (Cleistopetalum H. Okada, Enicosanthum Becc., Woodiellantha Rauschert)
  - Neo-uvaria Airy Shaw
  - Orophea Blume
  - Phaeanthus Hook.f. & Thomson
  - Platymitra Boerl.
  - Polyalthia Blume
  - Polyalthiopsis Chaowasku
  - Popowia Endl.
  - Pseuduvaria Miq.
  - Sageraea Dalzell
  - Sapranthus Seem.
  - Stelechocarpus Hook.f. & Thompson
  - Stenanona Standl.
  - Tridimeris Baill.
  - Trivalvaria (Miq.) Miq.
  - Wangia X.Guo & R.M.K.Saunders
  - Wuodendron B.Xue, Y.H.Tan & Chaowasku

== Uses ==
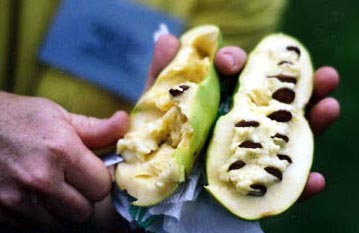
Asimina triloba fruit

=== Food ===
The large, edible, pulpy fruits of some members, typically called anona by Spanish- and Portuguese-speaking people of the family's Neotropical range, include species of Annona: custard apple (A. reticulata), cherimoya (A. cherimola), soursop/guanábana/graviola (A. muricata), sweetsop (A. squamosa), ilama (A. macroprophyllata), soncoya (A. purpurea), atemoya (a cross between A. cherimola and A. squamosa); and biriba (A. mucosa). The names of many of those fruits are sometimes used interchangeably.

The American pawpaw (Asimina triloba) has an Eastern United States distribution and has been investigated as a commercial agricultural crop.

Flower petals from sacred earflower (Cymbopetalum penduliflorum) and from related species C. costaricense were traditionally used to flavor chocolate before the arrival of cinnamon and the other Old World spices. The dried petals are still used to flavor atoles, pinoles, and coffee.

=== Toxicity ===
Consumption of the neotropical annonaceous plant Annona muricata (soursop, graviola, guanabana) has been strongly associated as a causal agent in "atypical Parkinsonism". The causative agents are acetogenins, especially the most abundant annonacin, found in all parts of the plant. It is thought to be responsible for up to 70% of Parkinsonian conditions in Guadeloupe. Exposure is typically through consumption of the fruits or its juice, traditional food and natural medicines.

The acetogenins, present in significative amounts in Annonaceae, cause atypical Parkinsonism by cumulatively inhibiting NADH dehydrogenase and disrupting mitochondrial function. Because of the cumulative effect, consumption of one fruit, or its juice, everyday for a year has the same effect as the consumption of one fruit every ten days for ten years. Annona muricata, Annona squamata, Annona reticulata, and Asimina triloba were shown to have toxic levels of acetogenins.

Asimina triloba's toxicity has been studied for use as a pesticide, an insecticide, and for cancer treatment. The unripe fruits were the parts that yield the highest levels of toxins.

=== Folk medicine ===
The bark, leaves, and roots of some species are used in folk medicines.

== Toxicology ==
The acetogenin compounds, which occur in the fruit, seeds, and leaves of many Annonaceae, including soursop (Annona muricata), are neurotoxins and seem to be the cause of a neurodegenerative disease. The disorder is a so-called tauopathy associated with a pathologic accumulation of tau protein in the brain. Experimental results indicate that acetogenins are responsible for this accumulation.

== Other uses ==
Lancewood (Oxandra lanceolata) is a tough, elastic, and heavy wood obtained from the West Indies and The Guianas. It was often used for carriage shafts. It is brought into commerce in the form of taper poles of about 6 m (20 ft) in length and from 15 to 20 cm (5.9 to 7.9 in) in breadth at the butt. The black lancewood or carisiri of the Guianas is of remarkably slender form.

The yellow lancewood tree Calycophyllum candididissimum, common names lemonwood or degame, is from a different family (Rubiaceae). It is used as an alternative to lancewood and is found in tolerable abundance throughout The Guianas, and used by the Amerinds for arrow-points, as well as for spars, beams, etc. Some bowyers use this wood for making longbows.

=== Other ===
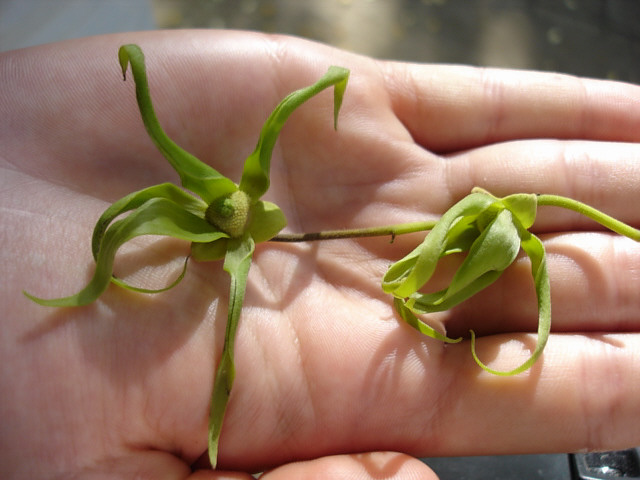
Ylang-ylang (Cananga odorata) flowers

- Some species of the family, such as Cananga odorata (ylang-ylang) also have aromatic oil and are used for perfumes or spices.
- The strong bark is used for carrying burdens in the Amazon rainforest and for wooden implements, such as tool handles and pegs. The wood is valued as firewood.
- Yellow and brown natural dyes
- Some species are also grown as ornamental plants, especially the Indian species Polyalthia longifolia pendula.
- The fruit and leaves of Uvariopsis tripetala (pepperfruit) are used as a spice for meats in some parts of Nigeria, due to its "hot" peppery flavor.

== Chemical constituents ==
A large number of chemical compounds, including flavonoids, alkaloids, and acetogenins, have been extracted from the seeds and many other parts of these plants. Flavonoids and alkaloids contained in the leaves and bark of several species of the family have shown insecticidal properties.
