= Bocageopsis =

Scientific classification
- Kingdom: Plantae
- Clade: Tracheophytes
- Clade: Angiosperms
- Clade: Magnoliids
- Order: Magnoliales
- Family: Annonaceae
- Genus: Bocageopsis; R.E.Fr.

Genus of flowering plants

Bocageopsis is a genus of flowering plants belonging to the family Annonaceae.

Its native range is Southern Tropical America.

Species:

- Bocageopsis canescens (Benth.) R.E.Fr.
- Bocageopsis mattogrossensis (R.E.Fr.) R.E.Fr.
- Bocageopsis multiflora (Mart.) R.E.Fr.
- Bocageopsis pleiosperma Maas
