= Kani =

Kani may refer to:

== Geography ==
- Kani (island), an island in the Maldives
- Kani, Myanmar
- Kani, Ivory Coast
- Kani, Iran (disambiguation)
- Kani, Republic of Dagestan, Russia
- Kani District, Gifu, Japan
- Kani, Gifu, Japan
- Kani River, Japan

== Other uses ==
- KANI, a radio station in Texas, United States
- Kani (letter), a Georgian letter
- Kani (name), with a list of persons having the name
- Kani tribe, a tribe in Kerala
- Kanikama (crab stick), a food product made from fish
- 4265 Kani, an asteroid
- Amiya Deb (1917–1983), Indian footballer and cricketer, nicknamed "Kani"
- Kani (crab), a genus of crab found in India

== See also ==
- Kanni (disambiguation)
- Kâni Karaca, Turkish musician
- KANI, radio station in Wharton, Texas
- Kani-Kéli, commune in Mayotte, France
