= Meiogyne trichocarpa =

Conservation status
- Least Concern (NCA)

Scientific classification
- Kingdom: Plantae
- Clade: Tracheophytes
- Clade: Angiosperms
- Clade: Magnoliids
- Order: Magnoliales
- Family: Annonaceae
- Genus: Meiogyne
- Species: M. trichocarpa

Binomial name
- Meiogyne trichocarpa (Jessup) D.C.Thomas & R.M.K.Saunders

Species of flowering plant

Meiogyne trichocarpa is a species of plants in the custard apple family Annonaceae. It is native to the east coast of Cape York Peninsula, Queensland, Australia, where it inhabits monsoon forest and beach forest at altitudes from sea level up to about 200 m (660 ft). It was first described as a subspecies of Meiogyne cylindrocarpa in 2007, and promoted to species rank in 2014. The Queensland Herbarium still treats this taxon as Meiogyne cylindrocarpa subsp. trichocarpa, and lists it as least concern under the Queensland Government's Nature Conservation Act.
