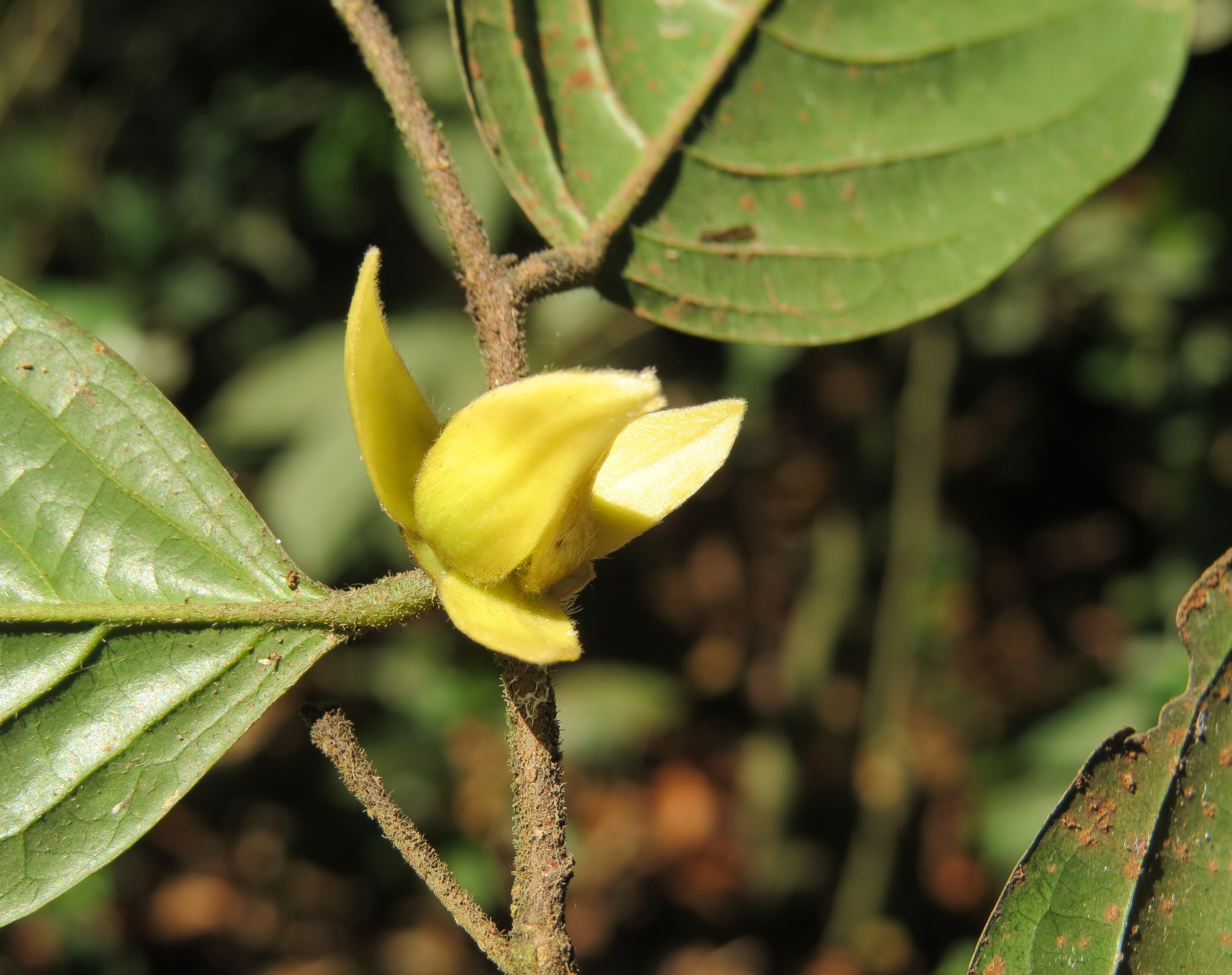
- Habit

Conservation status
- Near Threatened (IUCN 3.1)

Scientific classification
- Kingdom: Plantae
- Clade: Embryophytes
- Clade: Tracheophytes
- Clade: Spermatophytes
- Clade: Angiosperms
- Clade: Magnoliids
- Order: Magnoliales
- Family: Annonaceae
- Genus: Meiogyne
- Species: M. pannosa

Binomial name
- Meiogyne pannosa (Dalzell) J.Sinclair

Synonyms
- Desmos pannosus (Dalzell) Saff.; Unona pannosa Dalzell

= Meiogyne pannosa =

Species of flowering plant

Meiogyne pannosa is a small tree in the family Annonaceae endemic to the Western Ghats.

== Vernacular names ==
Malabar Fingersop, പന്തൽമരം, ചാവി (Malayalam).

== Description ==
This plant grows up to 8 m in height with grey, lenticellate bark and creamy blaze. Branches are whitish and pubescent. Leaves are simple, alternate, and lanceolate, with an acuminate tip and entire margins. Flowers are solitary, axillary or terminal, yellowish-green or dirty white, and tomentose. The fruit is a cluster of 1–3-seeded, elliptic berries, velvety and sessile.

== Phenology ==
Flowering and fruiting: Throughout the year.

== Uses ==
The leaves are dried along with those of Trichopus zeylanicus, Begonia malabarica, and the rhizome of Curculigo orchioides, then pounded into a powder. This powder is taken orally with honey to strengthen the body. The leaves, bark, and seeds are used to treat allergies, menorrhea, and cough.
