= Ennichi =

Japanese religious term

Ennichi (縁日, "related day") is a day believed to have a special relation (en) with a particular Japanese deity. Often, it is a day when a deity is believed to have been born or left the world. In Shinto, this day is encouraged to be embraced as it is in the "four affirmations" of their religious code. Japanese people generally think that visiting a temple or a shrine on these holy days related to Kami and/or Buddha will bring greater fortunes than on regular days. Therefore, temples and shrines often hold festivals. At such events, there are generally a large number of food stalls selling Japanese food, such as takoyaki, okonomiyaki, grilled corn, and cotton candy.

== See also ==
- Japanese festivals
- Kani
