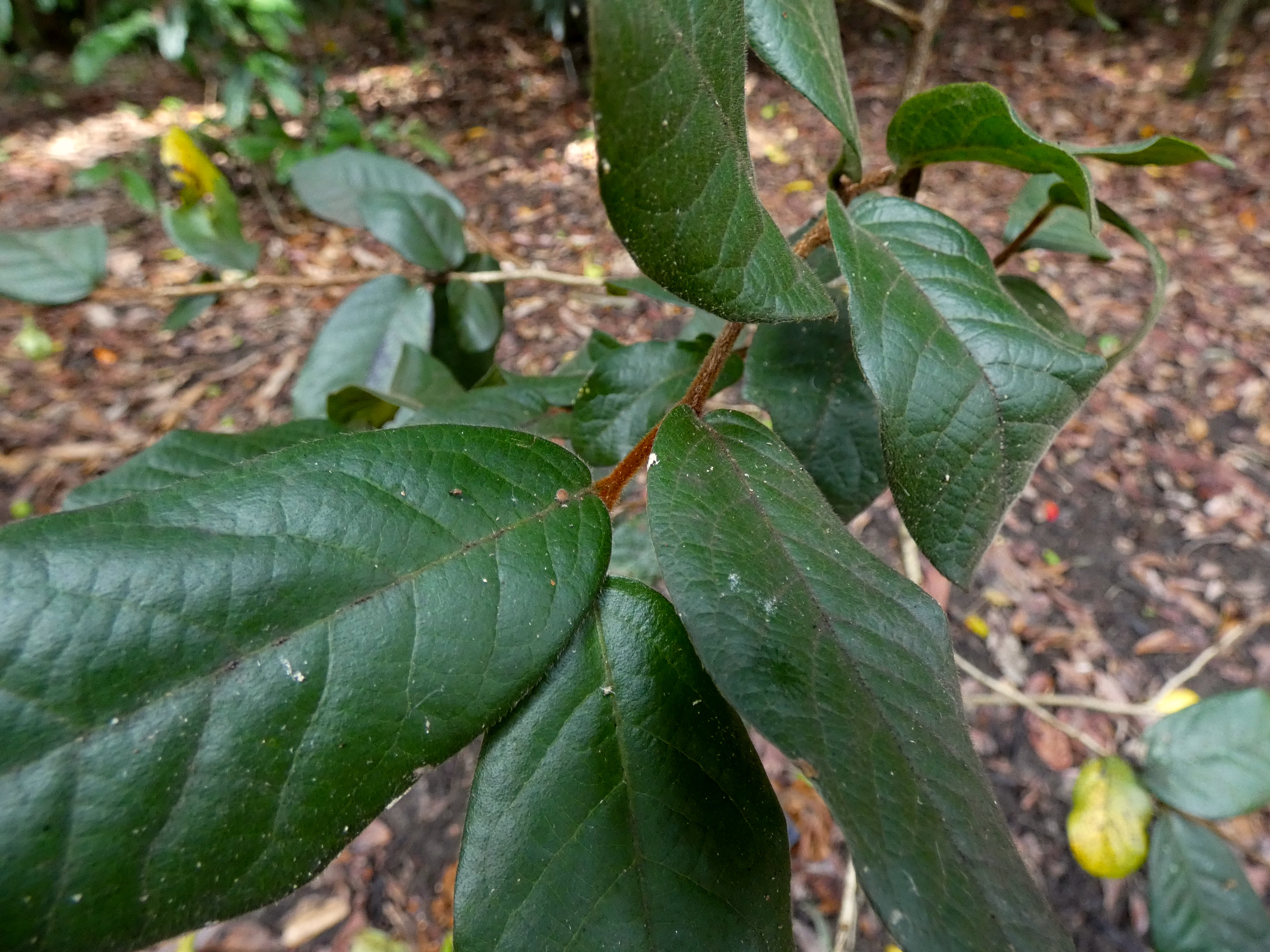

Conservation status
- Least Concern (IUCN 3.1)

Scientific classification
- Kingdom: Plantae
- Clade: Embryophytes
- Clade: Tracheophytes
- Clade: Spermatophytes
- Clade: Angiosperms
- Clade: Magnoliids
- Order: Magnoliales
- Family: Annonaceae
- Genus: Meiogyne
- Species: M. bidwillii

Binomial name
- Meiogyne bidwillii (Benth.) D.C.Thomas, Chaowasku & R.M.K.Saunders

Synonyms
- Homotypic: Saccopetalum bidwillii Benth.; Heterotypic: Fitzalania bidwillii (Benth.) Jessup, Kessler & Mols; Miliusa bidwillii (Benth.) R.E.Fr.

= Meiogyne bidwillii =

Species of flowering plant

Meiogyne bidwillii is a species of flowering plant in the custard apple family Annonaceae which is endemic to Queensland, Australia. It is a shrub or small tree to 5 m (16 ft) tall. The new growth is densely hairy, leaves are simple and arranged alternately on the twigs. Flowers are solitary and produced in the leaf axils. The fruit is an aggregate of several distinct orange/yellow carpels, each about 25 mm (1 in) long, 15 mm (0.6 in) wide and containing up to six seeds. It is found along the east coast of Queensland from about the Mackay region south to Hervey Bay.

== Conservation ==
This species has been assessed to be of least concern by the International Union for Conservation of Nature (IUCN) and by the Queensland Government under its Nature Conservation Act.

== Gallery ==
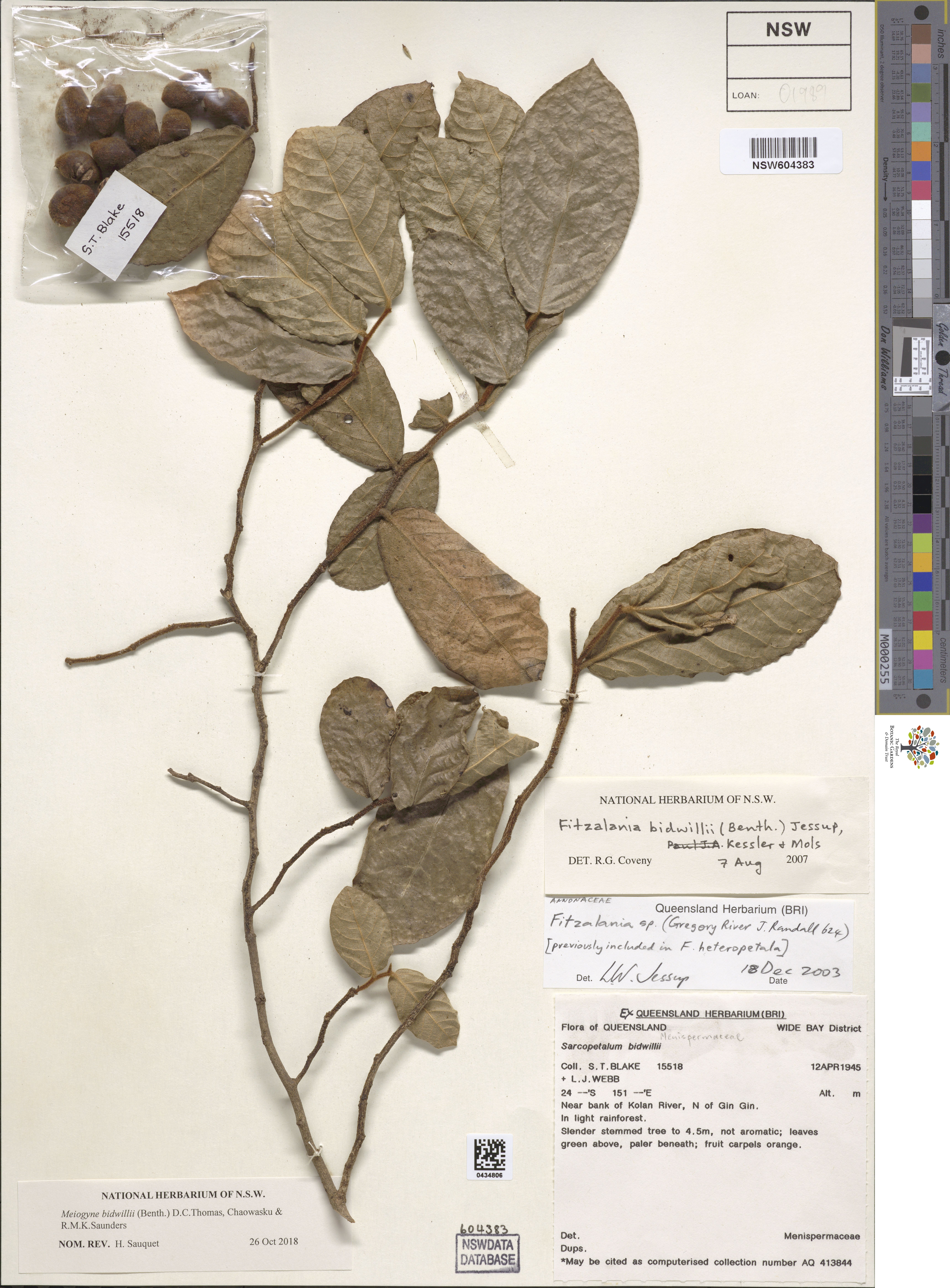
Herbarium specimen

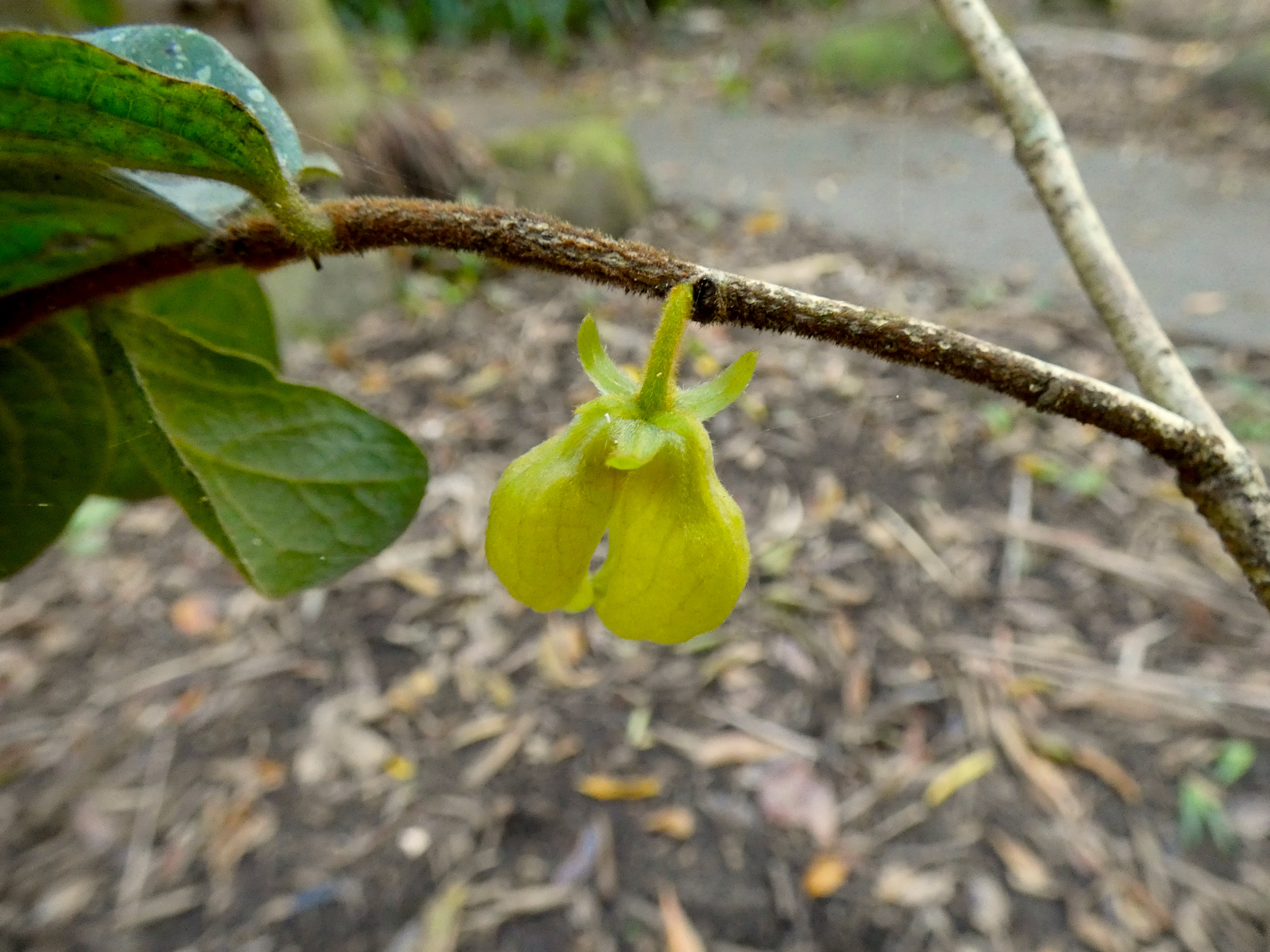
Immature flower

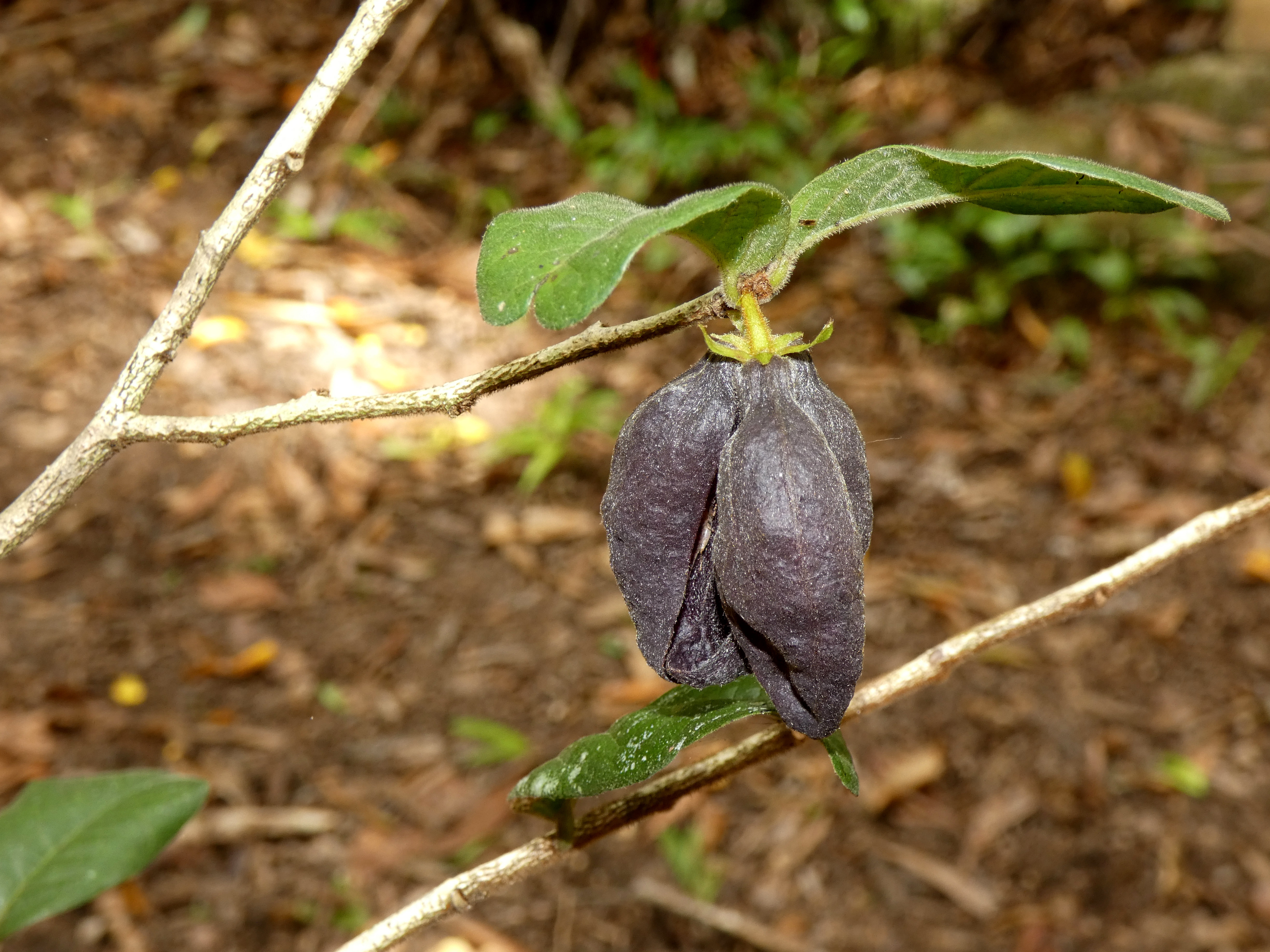
Mature flower

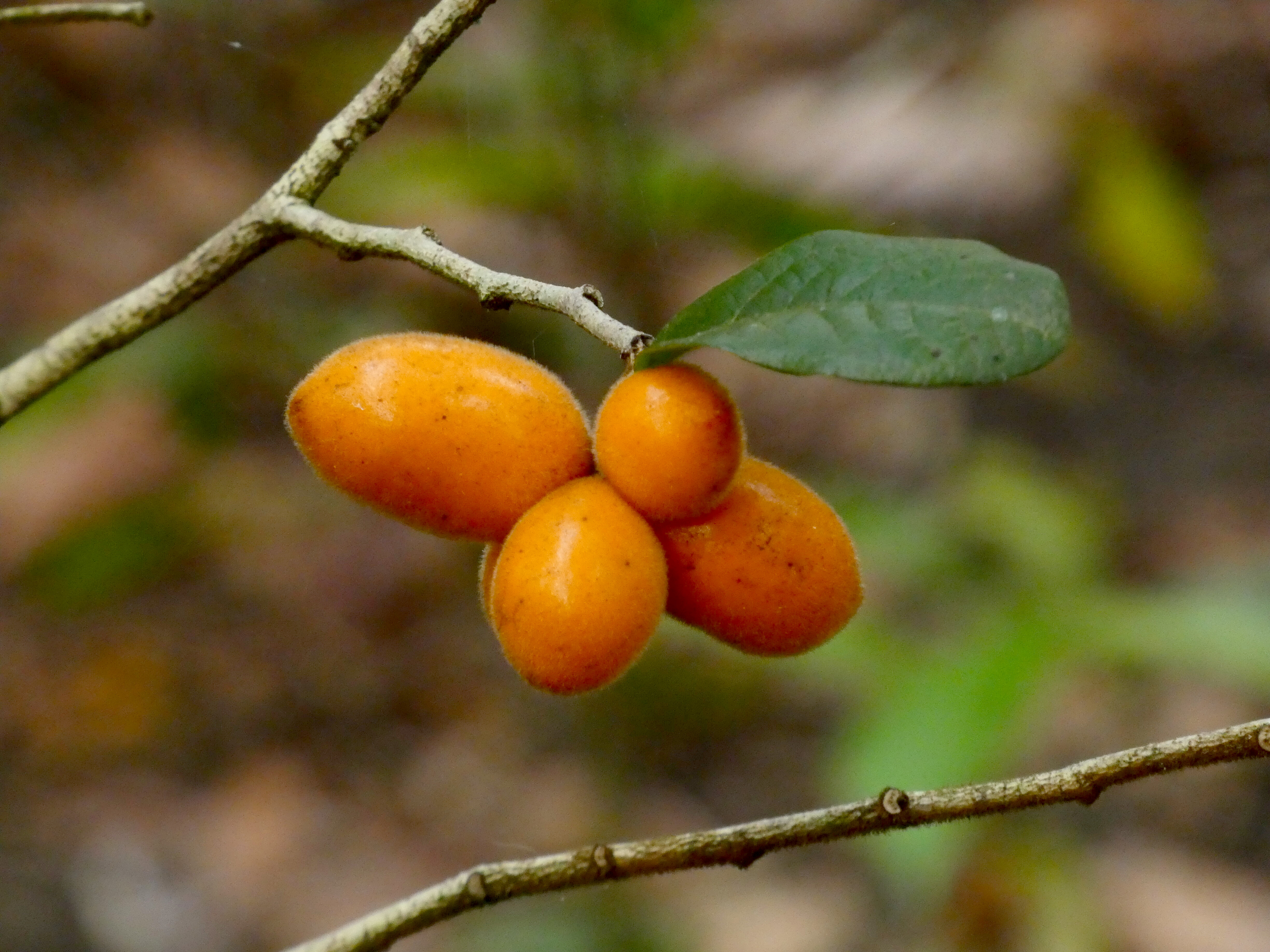
Ripe fruit
