= Meiogyne hainanensis =

Conservation status
- Vulnerable (IUCN 2.3)

Scientific classification
- Kingdom: Plantae
- Clade: Tracheophytes
- Clade: Angiosperms
- Clade: Magnoliids
- Order: Magnoliales
- Family: Annonaceae
- Genus: Meiogyne
- Species: M. hainanensis

Binomial name
- Meiogyne hainanensis (Merr.) Bân (1973)

Synonyms
- Chieniodendron hainanense (Merr.) Y.Tsiang & P.T.Li (1964); Desmos hainanensis (Merr.) Merr. & Chun (1935); Fissistigma hainanense Merr. (1925); Fissistigma maclurei Merr. (1923), nom. illeg.; Oncodostigma hainanense (Merr.) Y.Tsiang & P.T.Li (1979)

Genus of flowering plants

Meiogyne hainanensis is a species of flowering plant in the Annonaceae family. It is a tree native southern China, including the island of Hainan and southern Guangxi on the mainland. It is threatened by habitat loss.

The species was first described as Fissistigma hainanense by Elmer Drew Merrill in 1925. In 1973 Nguyên Tiên Bân placed it in genus Meiogyne as Meiogyne hainanensis. It is known by several synonyms including Chieniodendron hainanense and Oncodostigma hainanense.
