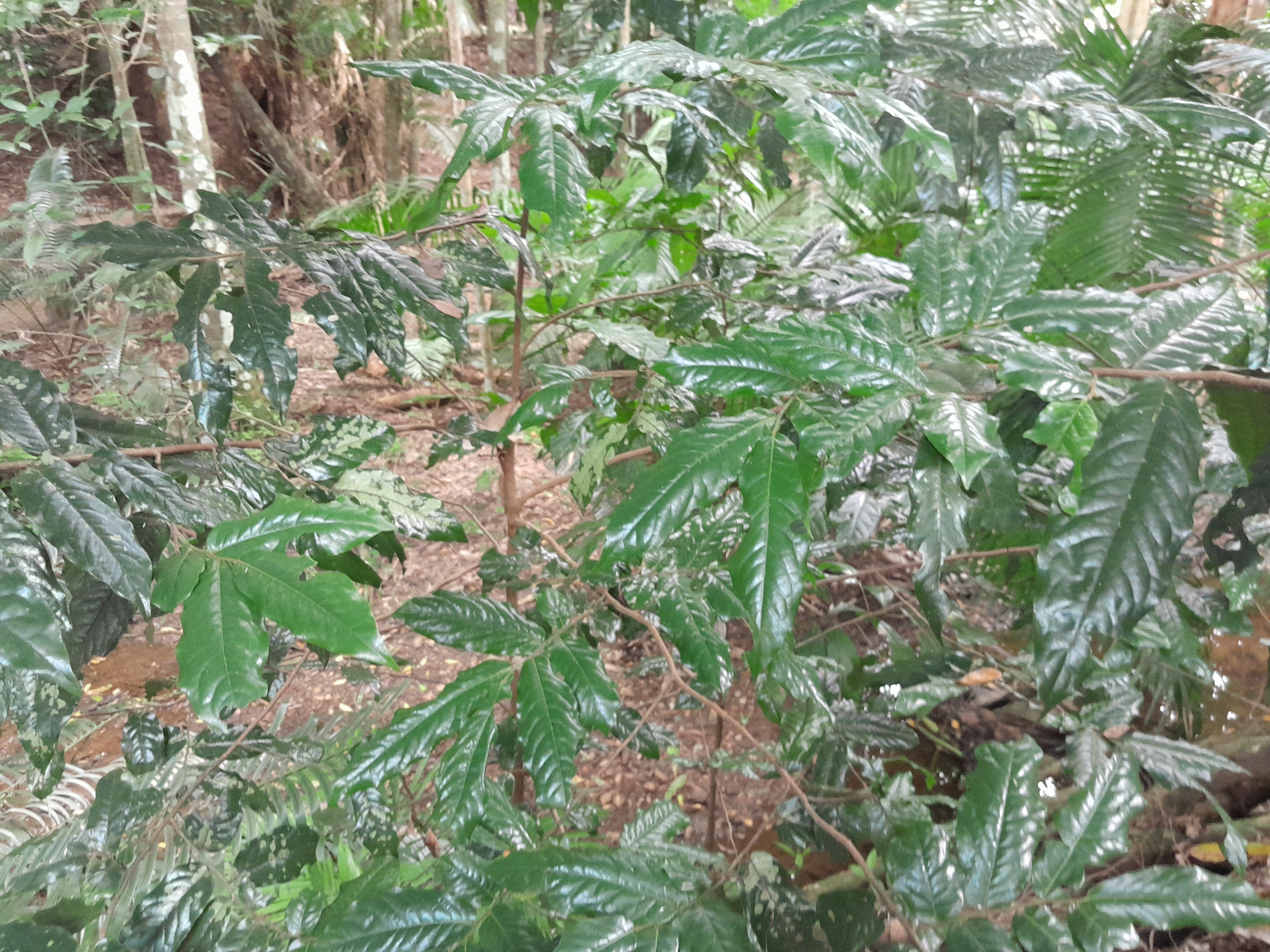
- Habit

Conservation status
- Near Threatened (NCA)

Scientific classification
- Kingdom: Plantae
- Clade: Tracheophytes
- Clade: Angiosperms
- Clade: Magnoliids
- Order: Magnoliales
- Family: Annonaceae
- Genus: Meiogyne
- Species: M. hirsuta

Binomial name
- Meiogyne hirsuta (Jessup) Jessup

Synonyms
- Ancana hirsuta Jessup

= Meiogyne hirsuta =

Species of flowering plant

Meiogyne hirsuta is a plant in the custard apple family Annonaceae endemic to the Wet Tropics bioregion of Queensland, Australia. It is known from only a small number of collections from three widely separated locations.

== Description ==
Meiogyne hirsuta is a shrub up to 2.5 m (8 ft 2 in) tall, the twigs and small branches covered with fine soft hairs. Leaves are arranged alternately, on short petioles about 2–3 mm (0.08–0.12 in) long. They are lanceolate to oblanceolate and slight asymmetric at the base. They measure up to 14 cm (5.5 in) long by 5 cm (2.0 in) wide, with 13–16 pairs of lateral veins either side of the midrib.

The flowers are solitary, borne in the leaf axils on pedicels (stems) up to 4 mm (0.16 in) long. The sepals are green, broadly ovate and about 5 mm (0.20 in) long and wide. The petals are pale yellow and finely hairy; there are two whorls of three petals each, the outer whorl slightly shorter at about 40 mm (1.6 in) long, the inner whorl about 48 mm (1.9 in) long and tinged purple at the base. There are 45–60 stamens up to 2 mm (0.08 in) long, and 5–16 carpels. The plant may flower when only 0.5 m (1 ft 8 in) high; the flowers emit an unpleasant odour.

The fruit is an aggregate fruit of botanical berries — in other words, it appears as a cluster of individual fruitlets, each of which has developed from one of the carpels in the flower. The fruitlets are orange and hairy, measure about 3.8 cm (1.5 in) long by 1.4 cm (0.55 in) wide, and contain up to five brown seeds about 9 mm (0.35 in) long.

=== Penology ===
Flowering occurs in November and December, fruit appear from January to March.

== Taxonomy ==
This species was first described in 1989 as Ancana hirsuta by the Australian botanist Laurence W. Jessup, based on material collected from all three localities where it is known to exist. In his paper, titled "The genus Ancana F.Muell. (Annonaceae) in Australia", Jessup noted that the distinctions between this genus and a number of others in the family are unclear, and in 2004 he formally transferred the species to its current placement in the genus Meiogyne.

=== Type ===
The designated type specimen was collected at Henrietta Creek in the Wooroonooran National Park.

=== Etymology ===
The genus name Meiogyne is from the Ancient Greek meíōn 'smaller', combined with gyne 'female'. It is a reference to the small number of carpels in the flowers.

== Distribution and habitat ==
This plant occurs in three widely separated locations, the most northerly is the Cedar Bay area near Cooktown. The next occurrence is about 95 km (59 mi) directly south, in the lower reaches of Mossman Gorge. The last occurrence is another 135 km (84 mi) SSE, in the foothills of the southern Atherton Tableland in the vicinity of the North Johnstone River.

It grows as an understorey plant in well-developed rainforest (complex mesophyll vine forest) (Note: See rainforest classifications at the Wet Tropics Management Authority website), at altitudes from near sea level to about 300 m (980 ft). Its area of occupancy (AOO) (Note: For a definition of Area of Occupancy see this page at the Atlas of Living Australia) is just 44 km^{2} (17 sq mi).

== Ecology ==
This plant serves as a host plant for the green-spotted triangle butterfly, Graphium agamemnon.

== Gallery ==
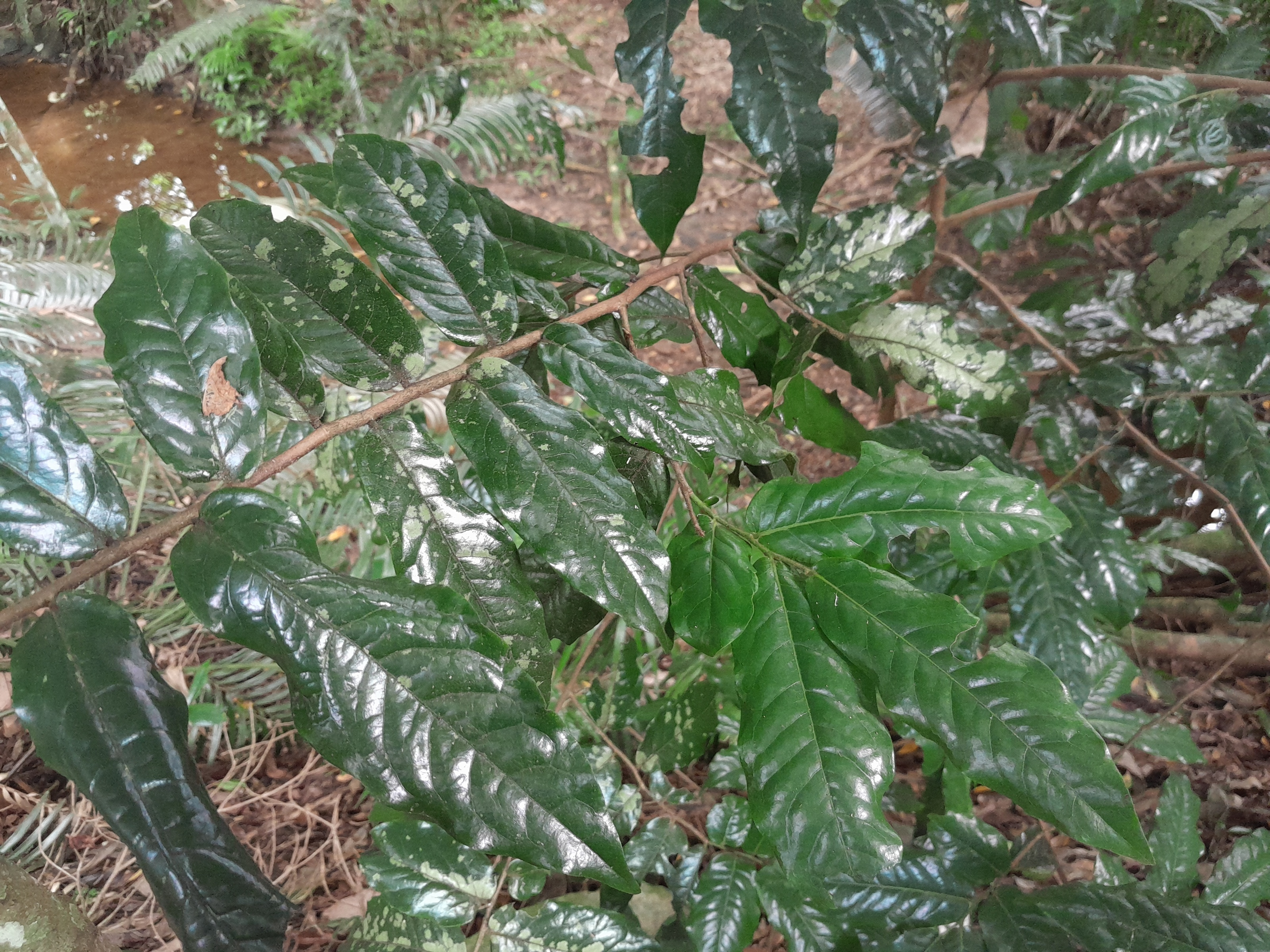
Foliage

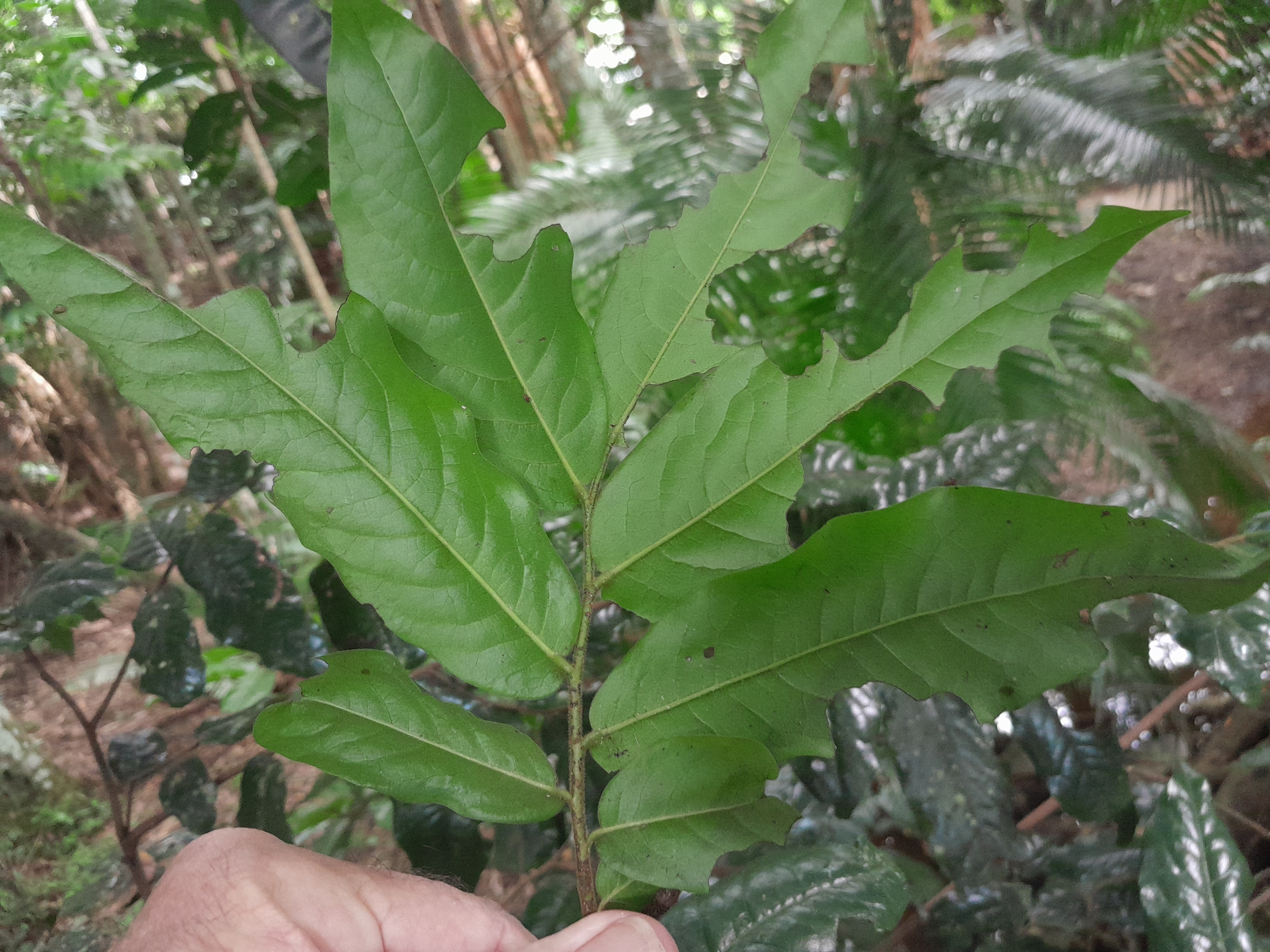
Underside of leaves

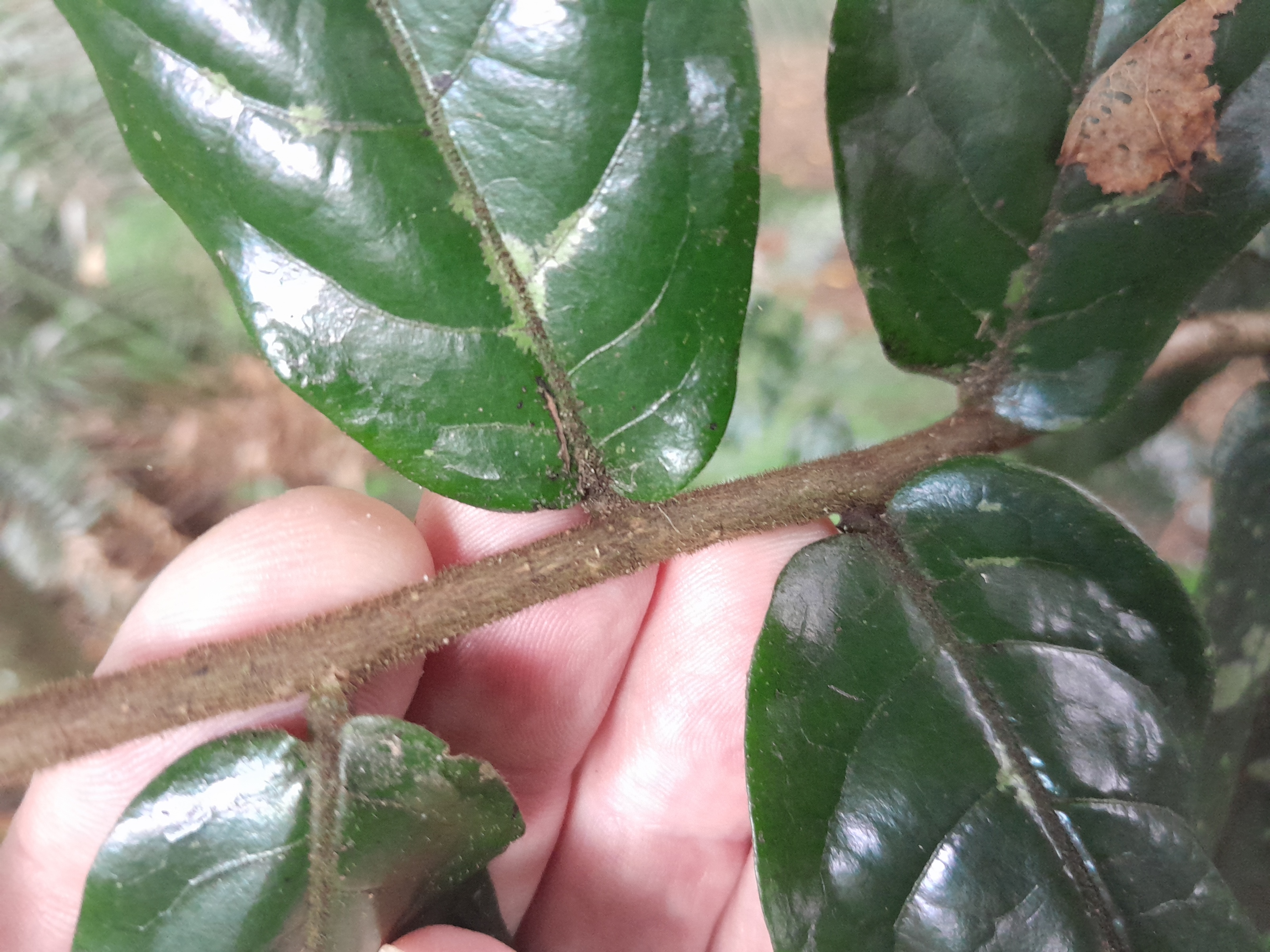
Detail of leaf base and twig

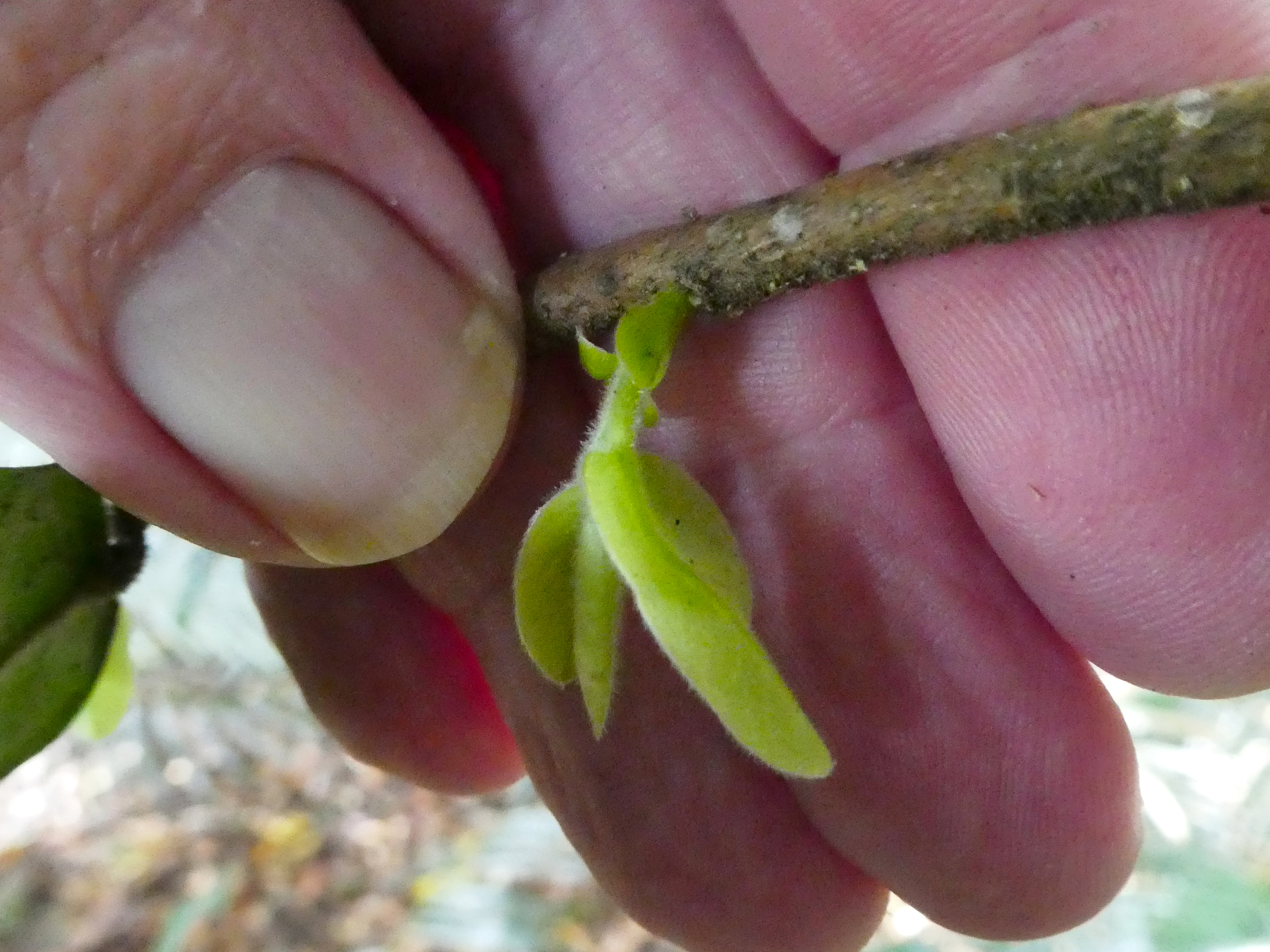
New leaf growth

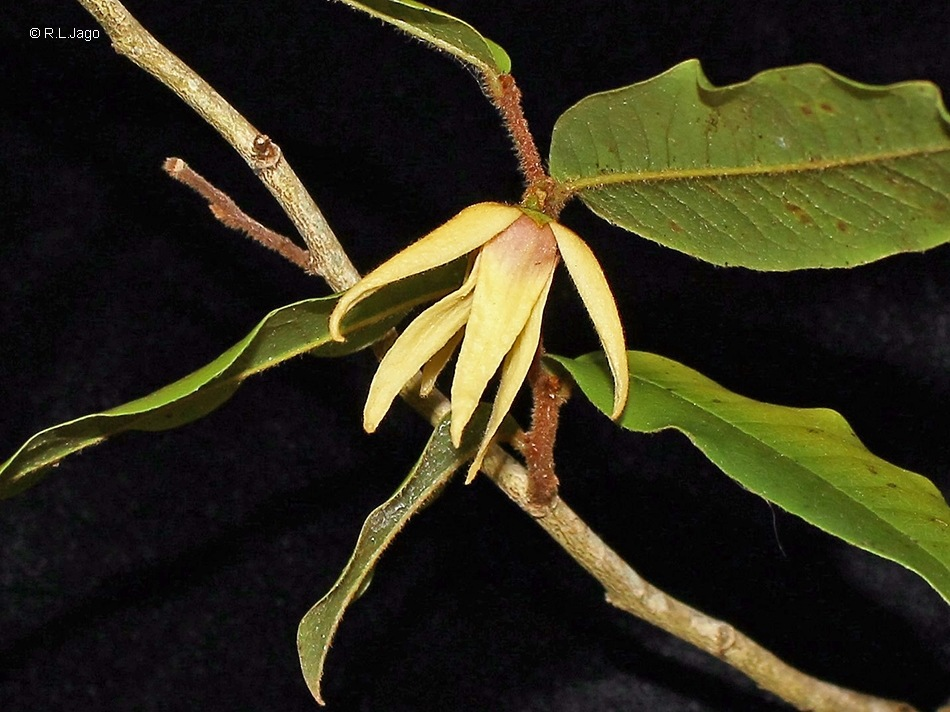
Flower
