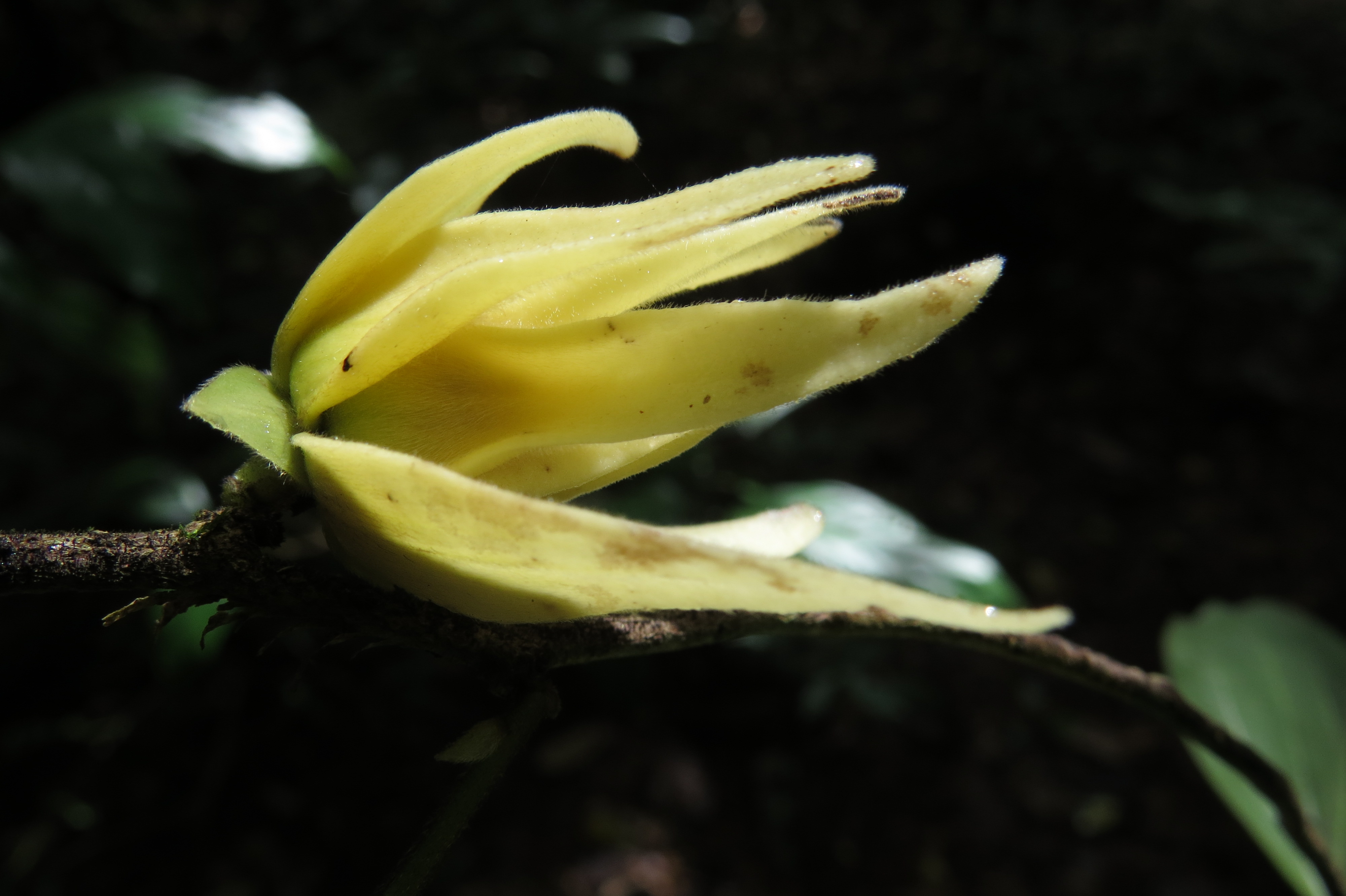
- Meiogyne pannosa

Scientific classification
- Kingdom: Plantae
- Clade: Tracheophytes
- Clade: Angiosperms
- Clade: Magnoliids
- Order: Magnoliales
- Family: Annonaceae
- Tribe: Miliuseae
- Genus: Meiogyne; Miq.

Species
- See text.

Synonyms
- Ancana F.Muell.; Ararocarpus Scheff.; Chieniodendron Tsiang & P.T.Li; Fitzalania F.Muell.; Guamia Merr.; Oncodostigma Diels; Polyaulax Backer

= Meiogyne =

Genus of flowering plants

Meiogyne is a genus of flowering plants with 38 species belonging to the family Annonaceae. It is native from southwestern India and Southeast Asia to Australia and the southwestern Pacific. The type species is Meiogyne virgata.

Meiogyne is distinguished by two morphological characters. The innermost whorl of stamens possesses elongated connectives. Most species also produce warty or corrugated outgrowths on the inner surface of the inner petals.

== Pollination ==
The inner petal outgrowths on the inner petals serve as food bodies for nitidulid, curculionid and staphylinid beetle pollinators in Meiogyne cylindrocarpa, Meiogyne stenopetala and Meiogyne trichocarpa.

Several Meiogyne species possess highly unusual pollination systems. The species Meiogyne hainanensis exhibits a three-way mutualistic relationship. Ascomycete fungi, such as Fusarium, Penicillium and Cladosporium grow on the inner petal outgrowth. The staphylinid and monotomid beetles pollinate the flower and lay eggs on the inner petal outgrowth. Once the eggs hatch, the larvae feed on the fungi.

The Australian species Meiogyne heteropetala imitates aboveground leaf litter and deceives erotylid beetles to achieve pollination.

== Species ==
As of May 2024 Plants of the World Online includes 38 species, as follows:

- Meiogyne amicorum (A.C.Sm.) B.Xue & R.M.K.Saunders
- Meiogyne amygdalina (A.Gray) B.Xue & R.M.K.Saunders
- Meiogyne anomalocarpa D.M.Johnson & Chalermglin
- Meiogyne arunachalensis N.V.Page
- Meiogyne baillonii (Guillaumin) Heusden
- Meiogyne beccarii I.M.Turner
- Meiogyne bidwillii (Benth.) D.C.Thomas, Chaowasku & R.M.K.Saunders
- Meiogyne caudata (C.E.C.Fisch.) I.M.Turner
- Meiogyne chiangraiensis Chalermglin & M.F.Liu
- Meiogyne cylindrocarpa (Burck) Heusden
- Meiogyne dumetosa (Vieill. ex Guillaumin) Heusden
- Meiogyne gardneri D.M.Johnson
- Meiogyne glabra Heusden
- Meiogyne habrotricha (A.C.Sm.) B.Xue & R.M.K.Saunders
- Meiogyne hainanensis (Merr.) Bân
- Meiogyne heteropetala (F.Muell.) D.C.Thomas, Chaowasku & R.M.K.Saunders
- Meiogyne hirsuta (Jessup) Jessup
- Meiogyne insularis (A.C.Sm.) D.C.Thomas, B.Xue & R.M.K.Saunders
- Meiogyne kanthanensis Ummul-Nazrah & J.P.C.Tan
- Meiogyne laddiana (A.C.Sm.) B.Xue & R.M.K.Saunders
- Meiogyne lecardii (Guillaumin) Heusden
- Meiogyne leptoneura (Diels) I.M.Turner & Utteridge
- Meiogyne maxiflora D.M.Johnson & Chalermglin
- Meiogyne microflora (H.Okada) B.Xue, M.F.Liu & R.M.K.Saunders
- Meiogyne mindorensis (Merr.) Heusden
- Meiogyne monosperma (Hook.f. & Thomson) Heusden
- Meiogyne oligocarpa B.Xue & Y.H.Tan
- Meiogyne pannosa (Dalzell) J.Sinclair
- Meiogyne papuana I.M.Turner & Utteridge
- Meiogyne punctulata (Baill.) I.M.Turner & Utteridge
- Meiogyne ramarowii (Dunn) Gandhi
- Meiogyne rubra Jaikhamseub, Damth. & Chaowasku
- Meiogyne stenopetala (F.Muell.) Heusden
- Meiogyne subsessilis (Ast) J.Sinclair
- Meiogyne trichocarpa (Jessup) D.C.Thomas & R.M.K.Saunders
- Meiogyne verrucosa Jessup
- Meiogyne vietnamica Jaikhamseub, T.A.Le & Chaowasku
- Meiogyne virgata (Blume) Miq.
