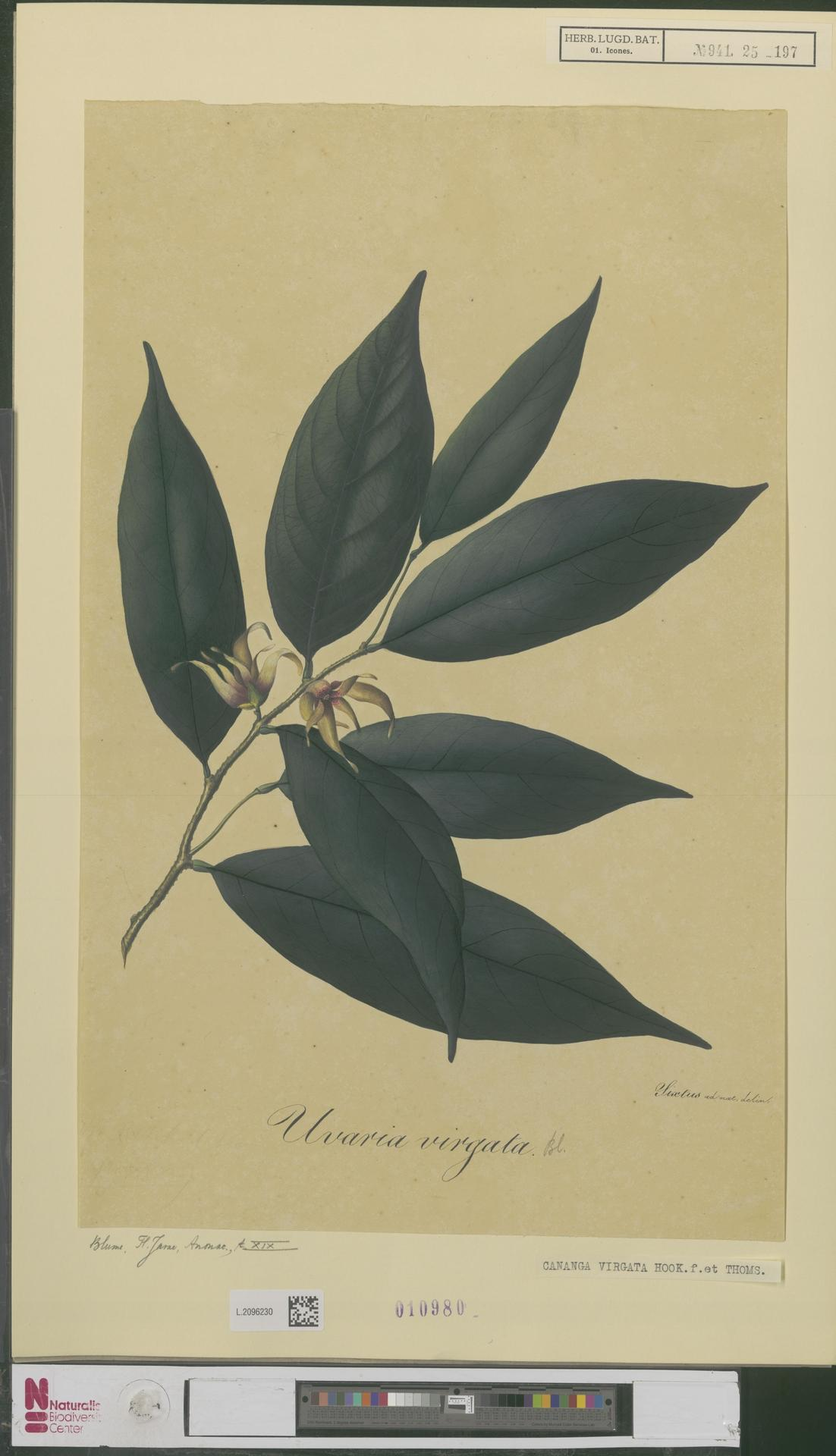

Conservation status
- Least Concern (IUCN 3.1)

Scientific classification
- Kingdom: Plantae
- Clade: Embryophytes
- Clade: Tracheophytes
- Clade: Spermatophytes
- Clade: Angiosperms
- Clade: Magnoliids
- Order: Magnoliales
- Family: Annonaceae
- Subfamily: Malmeoideae
- Tribe: Miliuseae
- Genus: Meiogyne
- Species: M. virgata

Binomial name
- Meiogyne virgata (Blume) Miq. (1865)

Synonyms
- List: Ararocarpus velutinus Scheff.; Cananga virgata (Blume) Hook.f. & Thomson; Cyathocalyx subsessilis Ast; Cyathocalyx virgatus (Blume) King; Desmos monogynus Merr.; Enicosanthum erianthum (Ridl.) Airy Shaw; Meiogyne eriantha (Ridl.) J.Sinclair; Meiogyne lucida Elmer; Meiogyne monogyna (Merr.) Bân; Meiogyne montana (Blume) Backer; Meiogyne paucinervia Merr.; Meiogyne philippinensis Elmer; Meiogyne stipitata Koord. & Valeton nom. illeg.; Meiogyne subsessilis (Ast) J.Sinclair; Polyalthia eriantha Ridl.; Stelechocarpus montanus (Noronha) Miq.; Unona virgata Blume (1825); Uvaria montana Blume; Uvaria virgata (Blume) Blume nom. illeg.

= Meiogyne virgata =

Species of tree

Meiogyne virgata is an Asian tree species in the family Annonaceae and tribe Miliuseae. Originally described in 1825 as Unona virgata, it was later placed as the type species of the genus Meiogyne by Friedrich Anton Wilhelm Miquel. This species has been recorded from: Borneo, Java, Malaya, Philippines, Thailand and Vietnam (where it is called thiều nhụy nhẵn).
