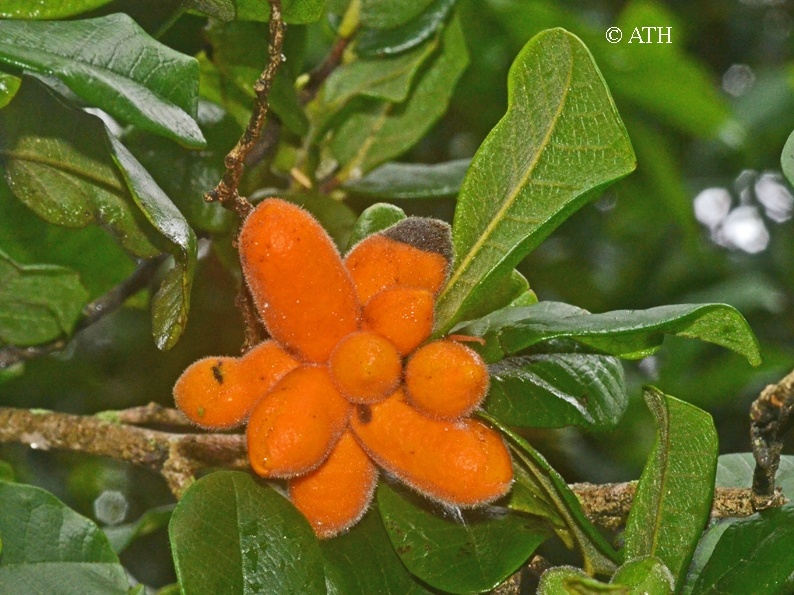
- Fruit

Conservation status
- Least Concern (NCA)
- Least Concern (IUCN 3.1)

Scientific classification
- Kingdom: Plantae
- Clade: Embryophytes
- Clade: Tracheophytes
- Clade: Spermatophytes
- Clade: Angiosperms
- Clade: Magnoliids
- Order: Magnoliales
- Family: Annonaceae
- Genus: Meiogyne
- Species: M. heteropetala

Binomial name
- Meiogyne heteropetala R.M.K.Saunders

Synonyms
- Fitzalania heteropetala (F.Muell.) F.Muell.; Uva heteropetala (F.Muell.) Kuntze; Uvaria heteropetala F.Muell.; Uraria heteropetala (F.Muell.) F.M.Bailey

= Meiogyne heteropetala =

Orange annona

Species of flowering plant

Meiogyne heteropetala, commonly known as orange annona, is a species of plants in the custard apple family Annonaceae. It is native to coastal areas of Queensland, Australia, from near Cairns in the north to about Maryborough. It is a shrub or small tree growing in drier types of rainforests and monsoon forest at elevations up to 100 m (330 ft). It was first described in 1862 as Uvaria heteropetala, and in 2014 it was moved to the genus Meiogyne.

The Queensland Herbarium treats this as Fitzalania heteropetala.

== Conservation ==
As of April 2025, this species has been assessed to be of least concern by the International Union for Conservation of Nature (IUCN) and by the Queensland Government under its Nature Conservation Act.

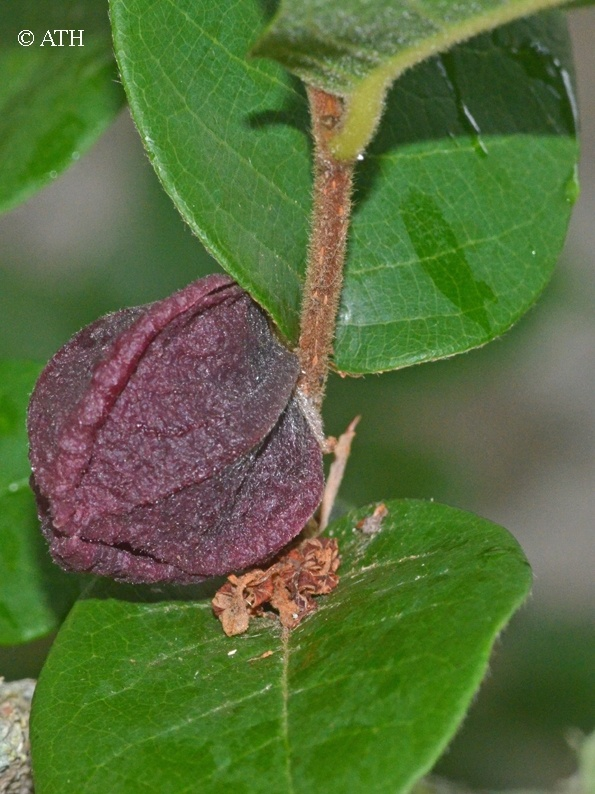
Flower

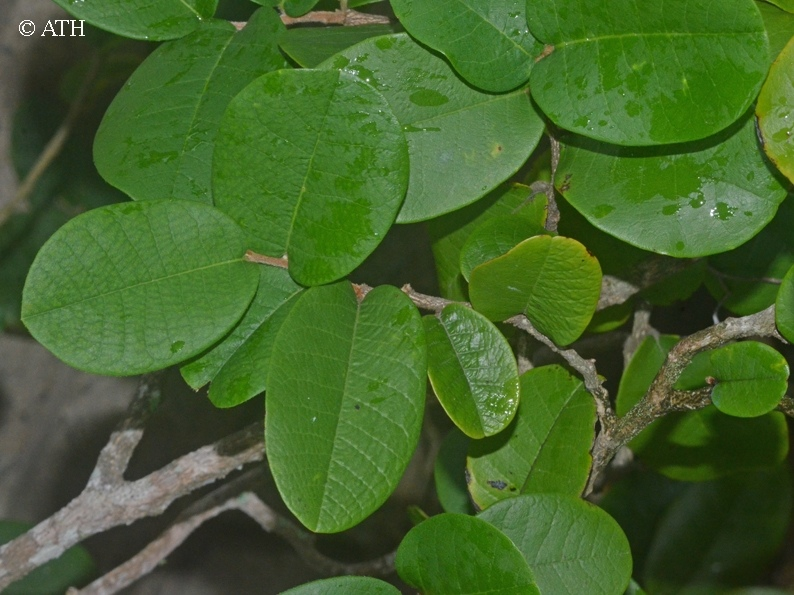
Foliage
