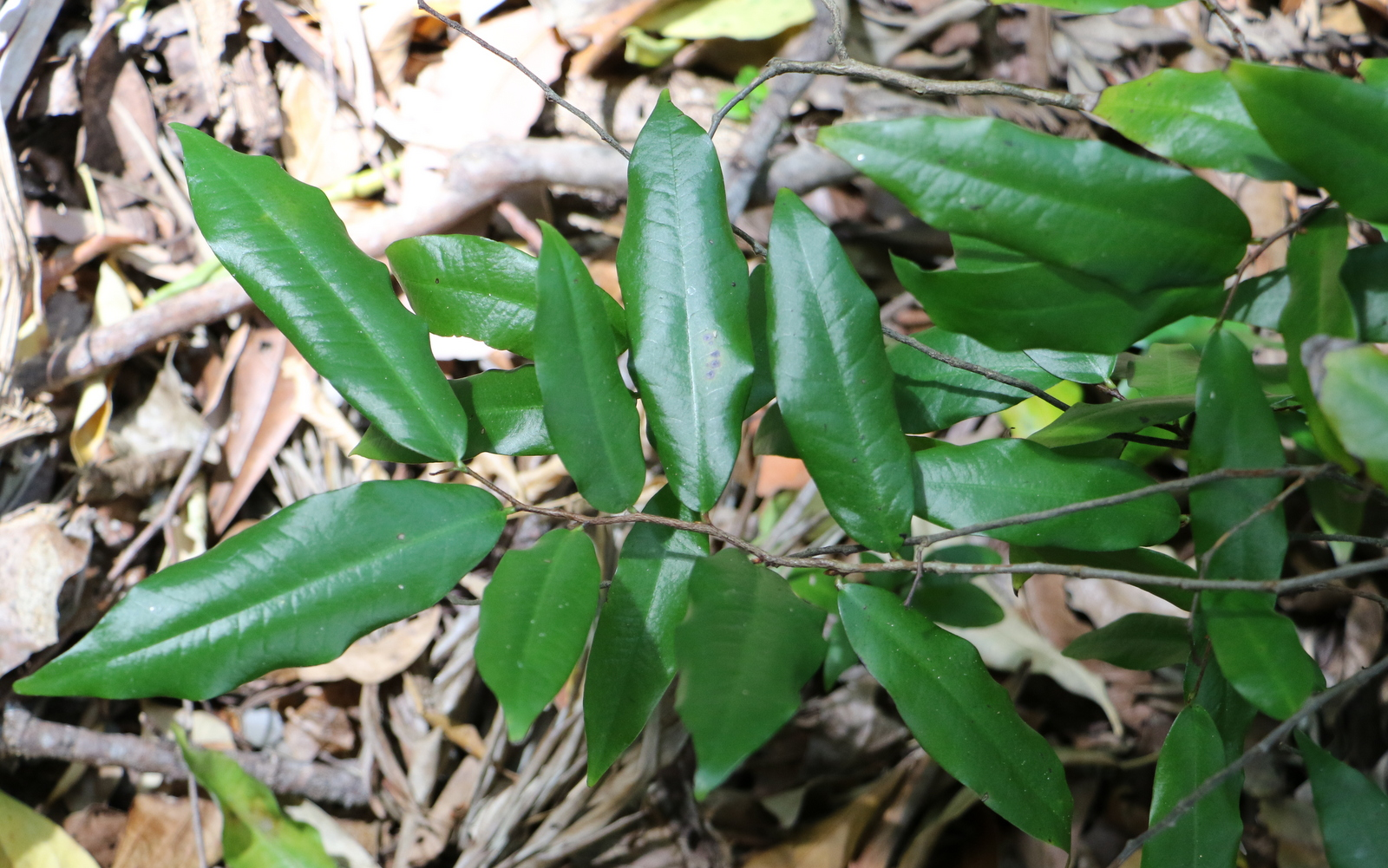

Scientific classification
- Kingdom: Plantae
- Clade: Tracheophytes
- Clade: Angiosperms
- Clade: Magnoliids
- Order: Magnoliales
- Family: Annonaceae
- Genus: Meiogyne
- Species: M. stenopetala

Binomial name
- Meiogyne stenopetala (F.Muell.) Heusden

Synonyms
- Ancana stenopetala F.Muell.; Fissistigma stenopetala (F.Muell.) R.E.Fr.

= Meiogyne stenopetala =

Species of shrub

Meiogyne stenopetala is a species of plant in the custard apple family Annonaceae. Often found as a small tree or shrub in lowland sub tropical rainforest in Australia.
