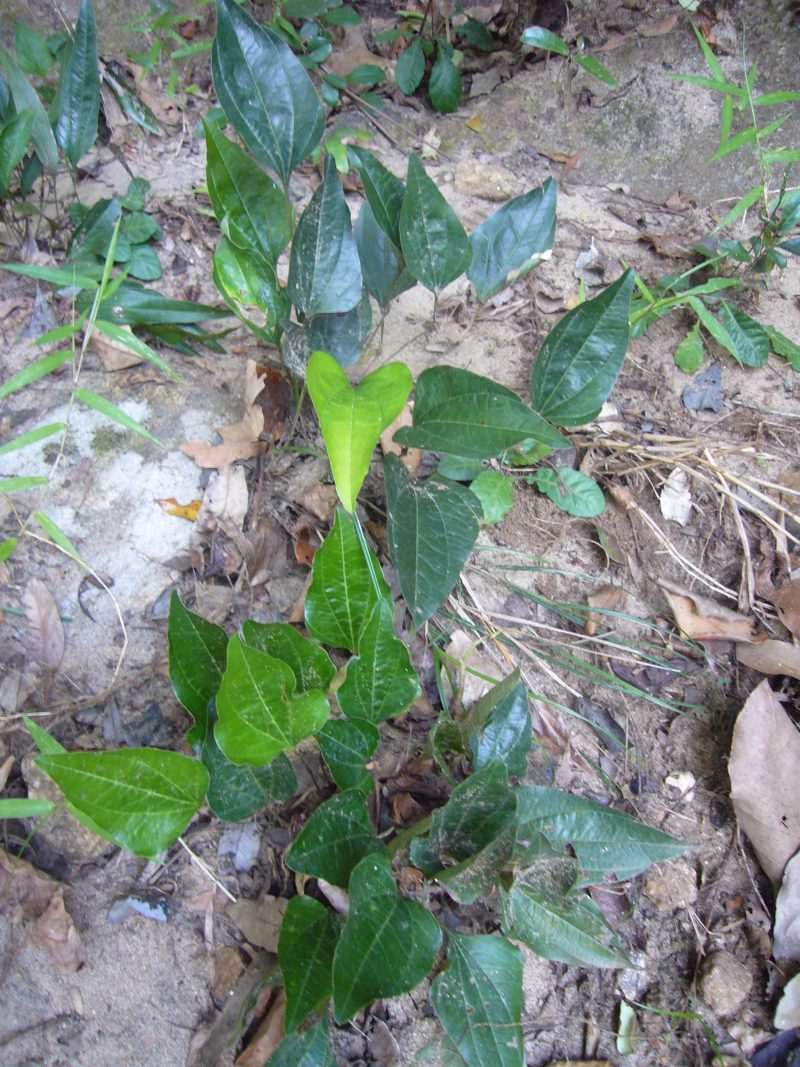
- Trichopus zeylanicus at Nilagala, Sri Lanka.

Scientific classification
- Kingdom: Plantae
- Clade: Tracheophytes
- Clade: Angiosperms
- Clade: Monocots
- Order: Dioscoreales
- Family: Dioscoreaceae
- Genus: Trichopus; Gaertn.

Species
- Trichopus sempervirens (H. Perrier) Caddick & Wilkin; Trichopus zeylanicus Gaertn.

Synonyms
- Trichopodium Lindl.; Steireya Raf.; Podianthus Schnizl.; Avetra H.Perrier

= Trichopus =

Genus of flowering plants

Trichopus is a genus of two known species of flowering plants. These plants were formerly included in the family Trichopodaceae, but are now considered to belong to Dioscoreaceae.

== Taxonomy ==
The known species of Trichopus are T. sempervirens, endemic to Madagascar and T. zeylanicus, native to India, Sri Lanka, Thailand and Malaysia.
