= Kani, Iran =

Kani (Persian: كاني or كني) may refer to:

- Kani, Hormozgan (كاني - Kānī)
- Kani, Khuzestan (كني - Kanī)
- Kani, Kurdistan (كاني - Kānī)

== See also ==
- Kani is a common element in Iranian place names; see
