= Meiogyne verrucosa =

Conservation status
- Least Concern (NCA)

Scientific classification
- Kingdom: Plantae
- Clade: Tracheophytes
- Clade: Angiosperms
- Clade: Magnoliids
- Order: Magnoliales
- Family: Annonaceae
- Genus: Meiogyne
- Species: M. verrucosa

Binomial name
- Meiogyne verrucosa Jessup

Species of flowering plant

Meiogyne verrucosa is a species of plants in the custard apple family Annonaceae, native to the Wet Tropics bioregion of Queensland, Australia. It is a shrub to about 3 m (9.8 ft) tall that inhabits mature rainforest on granitic soils.

== Conservation ==
This species is listed as least concern under the Queensland Government's Nature Conservation Act. As of 19 April 2025, it has not been assessed by the International Union for Conservation of Nature (IUCN).

== Ecology ==
This species is a host plant for larvae of the Green Spotted Triangle butterfly, Graphium agamemnon.
