= Meiogyne laddiana =

Conservation status
- Least Concern (IUCN 3.1)

Scientific classification
- Kingdom: Plantae
- Clade: Embryophytes
- Clade: Tracheophytes
- Clade: Spermatophytes
- Clade: Angiosperms
- Clade: Magnoliids
- Order: Magnoliales
- Family: Annonaceae
- Genus: Meiogyne
- Species: M. laddiana

Binomial name
- Meiogyne laddiana (A.C.Sm.) B.Xue & R.M.K.Saunders

Synonyms
- Polyalthia laddiana A.C.Sm.

Species of flowering plant

Meiogyne laddiana is a species of flowering plant in the family Annonaceae, first described by Albert Charles Smith in 1936 as Polyalthia laddiana. It is a tree endemic to southeastern Fiji.
