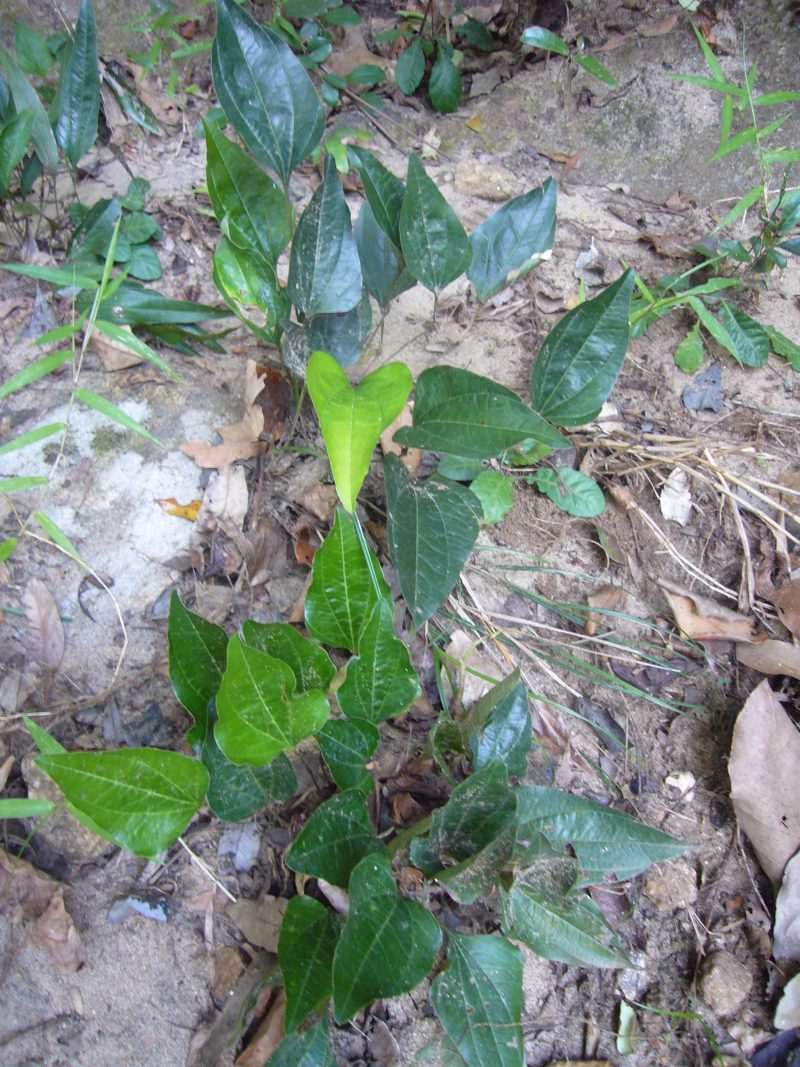
- Trichopus zeylanicus at Nilagala, Sri Lanka.

Scientific classification
- Kingdom: Plantae
- Clade: Tracheophytes
- Clade: Angiosperms
- Clade: Monocots
- Order: Dioscoreales
- Family: Dioscoreaceae
- Genus: Trichopus
- Species: T. zeylanicus

Binomial name
- Trichopus zeylanicus Gaertn.

= Trichopus zeylanicus =

Species of flowering plant

Trichopus zeylanicus is a small herbaceous plant, which is one of only two species of its genus, Trichopus. Formerly it was placed in its own family, Trichopodaceae, but is now included in the family Dioscoreaceae. The leaves are about 20 centimetres (7.9 in) long and grow from a rhizome. The shape of the leaves can be highly variable even within one location, but the most common shape is cordate. The herb grows on sandy soil near rivers and streams in shady places in lowland and intermediate altitude forests. It flowers year long and the fruits are thought to be dispersed by water. The unusual flowers are purplish black.

== Distribution ==
T. zeylanicus grows in Malaysia, Singapore, Sri Lanka, Thailand and the Southwestern Ghats mountains of Southern India.

== Traditional medicine ==
It has been used for centuries by the Kaani tribal community of the Agastya Koodam ranges in Tamil Nadu and Kerala, India, for its medicinal properties.

Modern Indian scientists learned the medical properties of Trichopus zeylanicus in December 1987 while on a scientific expedition to the Agasthia Hills in the Western Ghats. They noticed that their guides, belonging to the Kaani tribe, were very energetic in sharp contrast to themselves. They had walked for several hours with the scientists, but the difference was that they ate the fruits of a wild plant T. zeylanicus as they walked. It was found from the Kaani men that it was indeed the fruits they were eating that made them energetic, a fact about the plant well known to the tribe for ages. Historically, the members of the tribes called the plant 'chathan kalanji' literally meaning 'satan destroyer'. The more popular name of the plant, "Arogya pacha" (literally meaning "the green that gives strength") was given to it by the scientists.

Detailed chemical and pharmacological investigations showed that the leaf of the plant contained flavonoid glycosides, glycolipids and some other non-steroidal compounds. In the article published in www.ijpcbs.com showed the antibacterial and antifungal activities of the leaf extract against 8 bacterial and 8 fungal strains.

== Legal issues ==
The Indian commercial and scientific interest in the herb caused misguided suspicions of bio-piracy in Sri Lanka, where it is called Bimpol, and exports of the herb were forbidden in 1998.

== Images ==
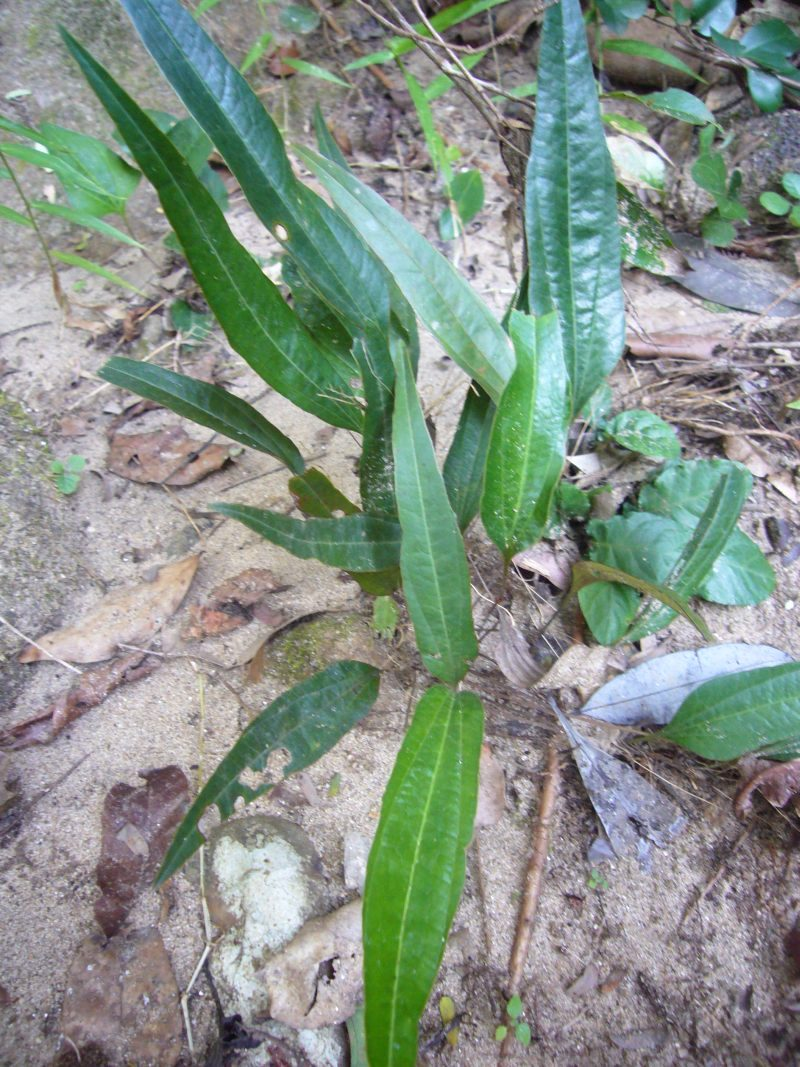
Lanceolate leaf type, Nilagala, Sri Lanka

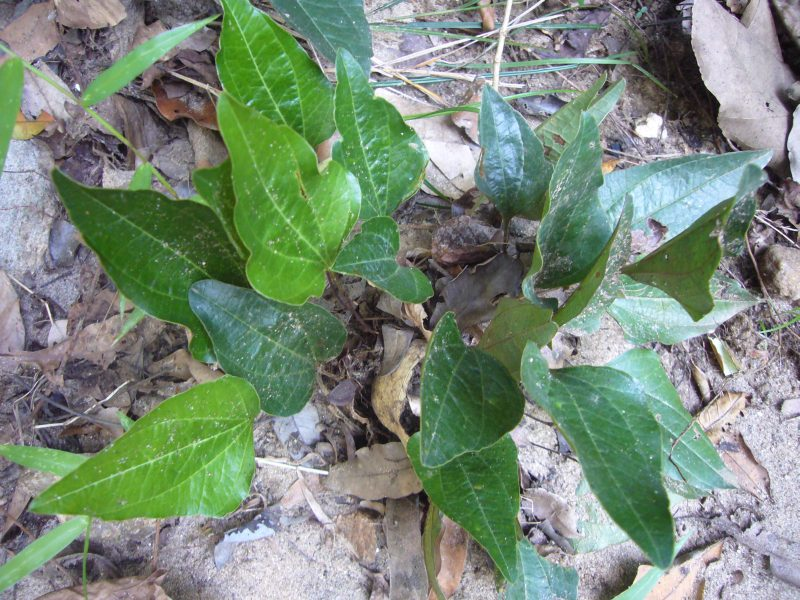
Cordate leaf type, Nilagala, Sri Lanka

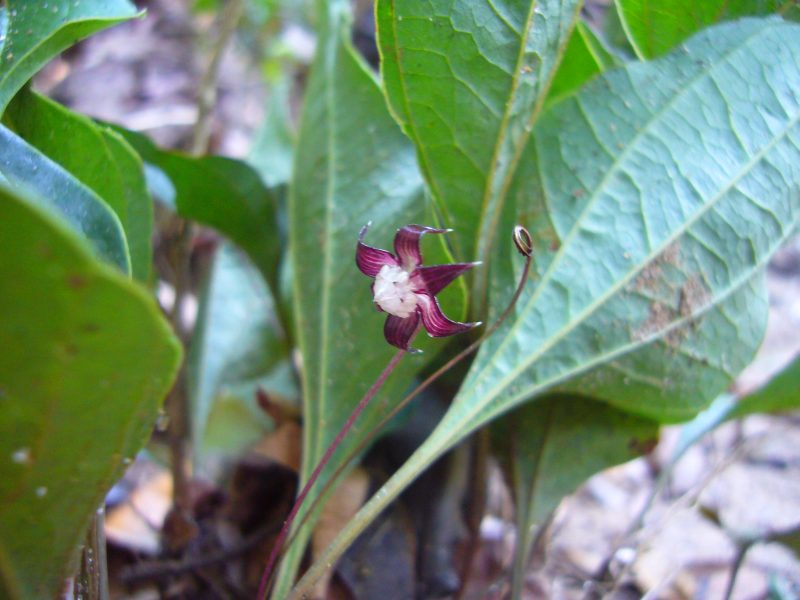
With flower, from side, Nilagala, Sri Lanka

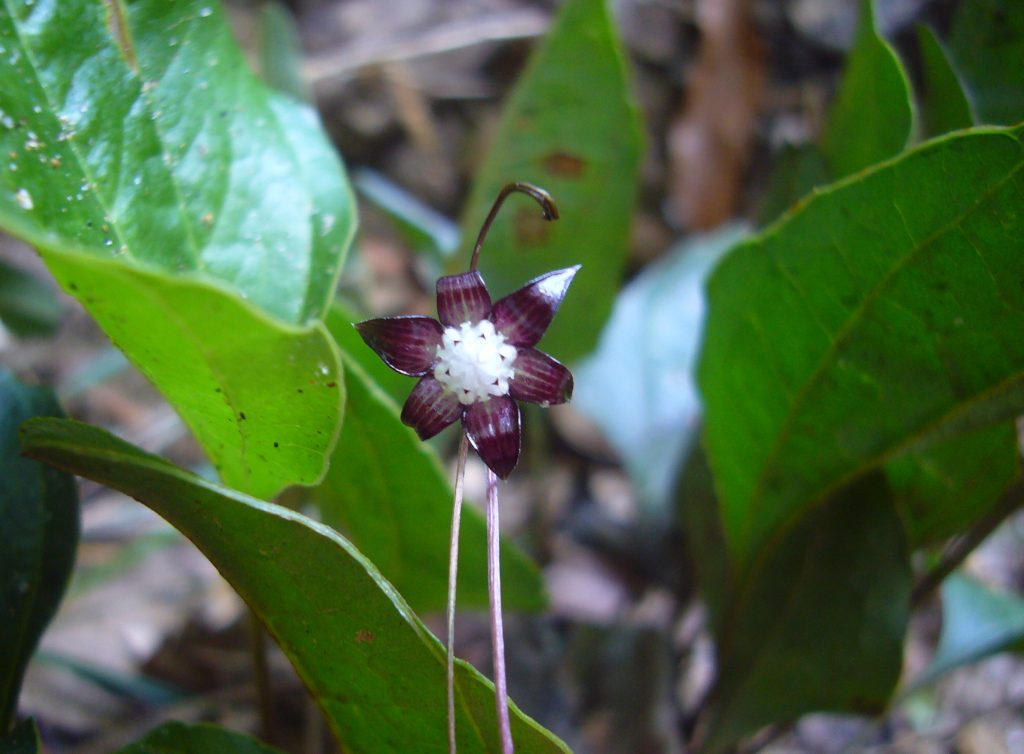
With flower, Nilagala, Sri Lanka

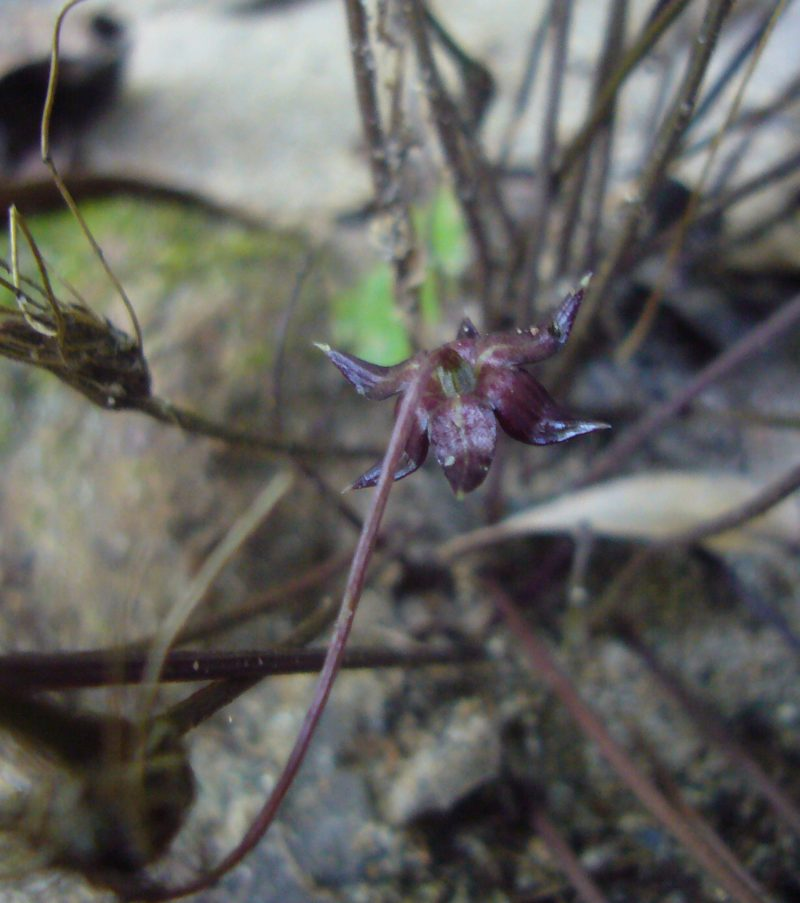
Flower from above, Nilagala, Sri Lanka

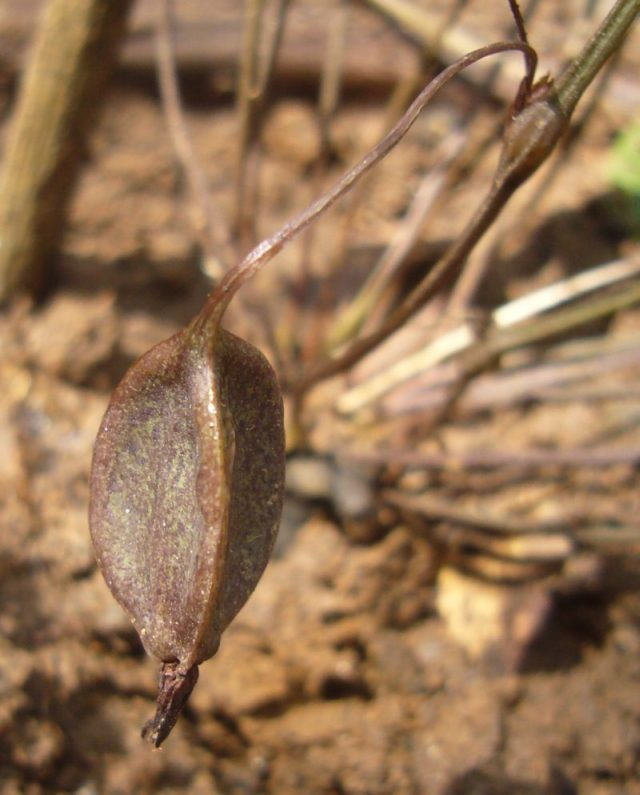
Fruit, Nilagala, Sri Lanka
