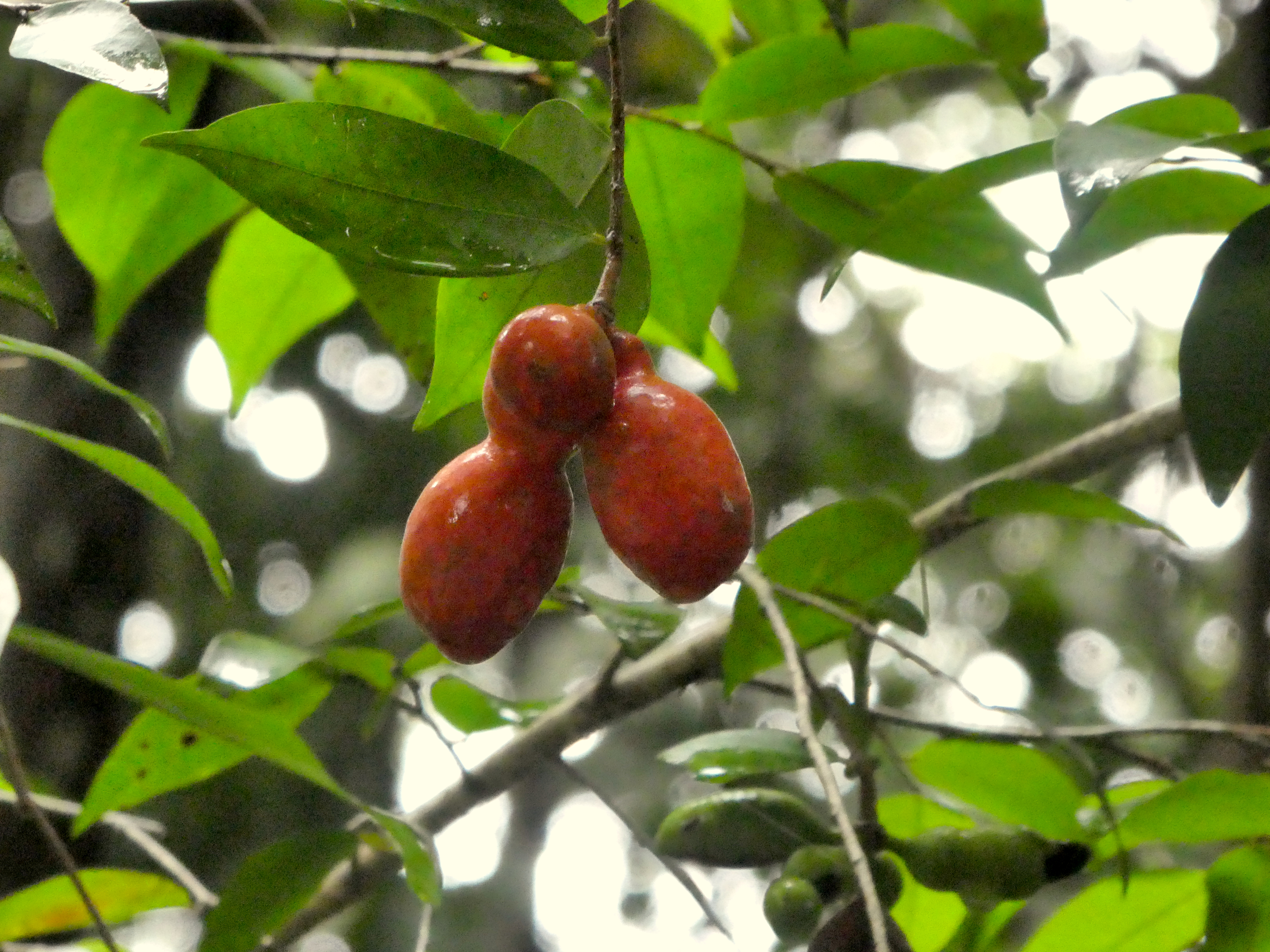
- Cairns Botanic Gardens, January 2023

Conservation status
- Least Concern (NCA)
- Least Concern (IUCN 3.1)

Scientific classification
- Kingdom: Plantae
- Clade: Embryophytes
- Clade: Tracheophytes
- Clade: Spermatophytes
- Clade: Angiosperms
- Clade: Magnoliids
- Order: Magnoliales
- Family: Annonaceae
- Genus: Meiogyne
- Species: M. cylindrocarpa

Binomial name
- Meiogyne cylindrocarpa (Burck) Heusden

Synonyms
- Homotypic: Mitrephora cylindrocarpa Burck; Polyaulax cylindrocarpa (Burck) Backer; Heterotypic: Alphonsea sessiliflora Merr.; Guamia mariannae (Saff.) Merr.; Oncodostigma wilsonii Guillaumin; Papualthia mariannae Saff.; Polyalthia mariannae (Saff.) Merr.

= Meiogyne cylindrocarpa =

Fingersop

Species of plant in the soursop family

Meiogyne cylindrocarpa, commonly known as fingersop or native apricot in Australia, is a small tree or shrub in the custard apple family Annonaceae. It is native to parts of tropical Asia and Australasia.

== Description ==
Meiogyne cylindrocarpa is an evergreen rainforest plant with an open habit. It will grow to 10 m (33 ft) high, and perhaps 20 m (66 ft). The dark green leaves are held on petioles about 1.5 to 3 mm (0.06 to 0.12 in) long, and measure up to 9.6 cm (3.8 in) long by 4.3 cm (1.7 in) wide, with 7 to 13 pairs of secondary veins. They are glossy above and glabrescent (minutely hairy) underneath.

The flowers may be solitary or paired, with six fleshy, triangular petals arranged in two whorls of three. The outer petals measure up to 10 mm (0.39 in) long by 7 mm (0.28 in) wide.

The fruit are elongated and cylindrical in shape. They measure up to 3.3 cm (1.3 in) long and 1.6 cm (0.63 in) diameter, and are initially green, becoming orange or red when ripe, and they contain up to 9 disc-like seeds up to 9 mm diameter. They are edible and sweet and have been compared to a sapodilla with a floral flavour.

== Taxonomy ==
This plant was first described in 1909 as Mitrephora cylindrocarpa by the Dutch botanist William Burck, and published in the book Nova Guinea : résultats de l'expédition scientifique néerlandaise à la Nouvelle-Guinée. In 1945 it was transferred to the genus Polyaulax by another Dutch botanist, Cornelis Andries Backer, where it remained until 1994 when it was again transferred to a new genus and given the current combination by E.C.H. van Heusden, also from the Netherlands.

== Distribution and habitat ==
Meiogyne cylindrocarpa is native to Borneo, Java, the Philippines, New Guinea, the Mariana Islands, and Vanuatu, and to Western Australia, the Northern Territory and Queensland in Australia. It grows in drier types of rainforest such as monsoon forest, in rocky areas and gullies.

== Ecology ==
This plant is a host plant for larvae of the pale green triangle butterfly Graphium eurypylus. The fruit are eaten by fruit doves.

== Conservation ==
This species has been assessed as being of least concern by both the International Union for Conservation of Nature and by the Queensland Government under its Nature Conservation Act.

== Cultivation ==
Fingersop is typically propagated by seeds, taking anywhere from two weeks to six months to germinate. Seedlings of M. c. subsp. cylindrocarpa tend to be smaller, with a bushier form than M. c. subsp. trichocarpa, which is more erect. Trees bear fruit after five to six years, but when grafted, will produce much sooner and develop a smaller, more compact form.

The plant is available in Australia and elsewhere from plant nurseries.

== Gallery ==
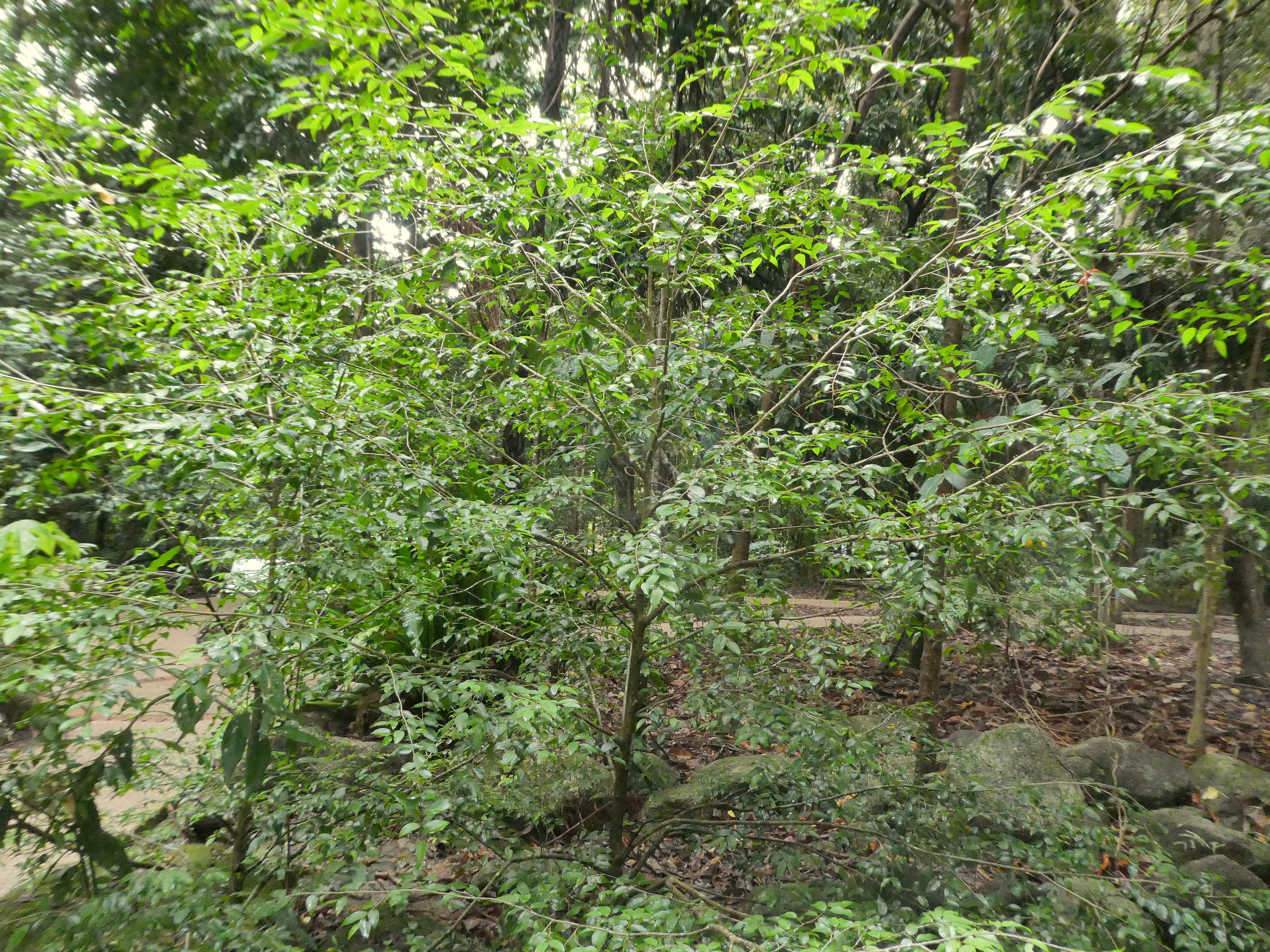
Habit

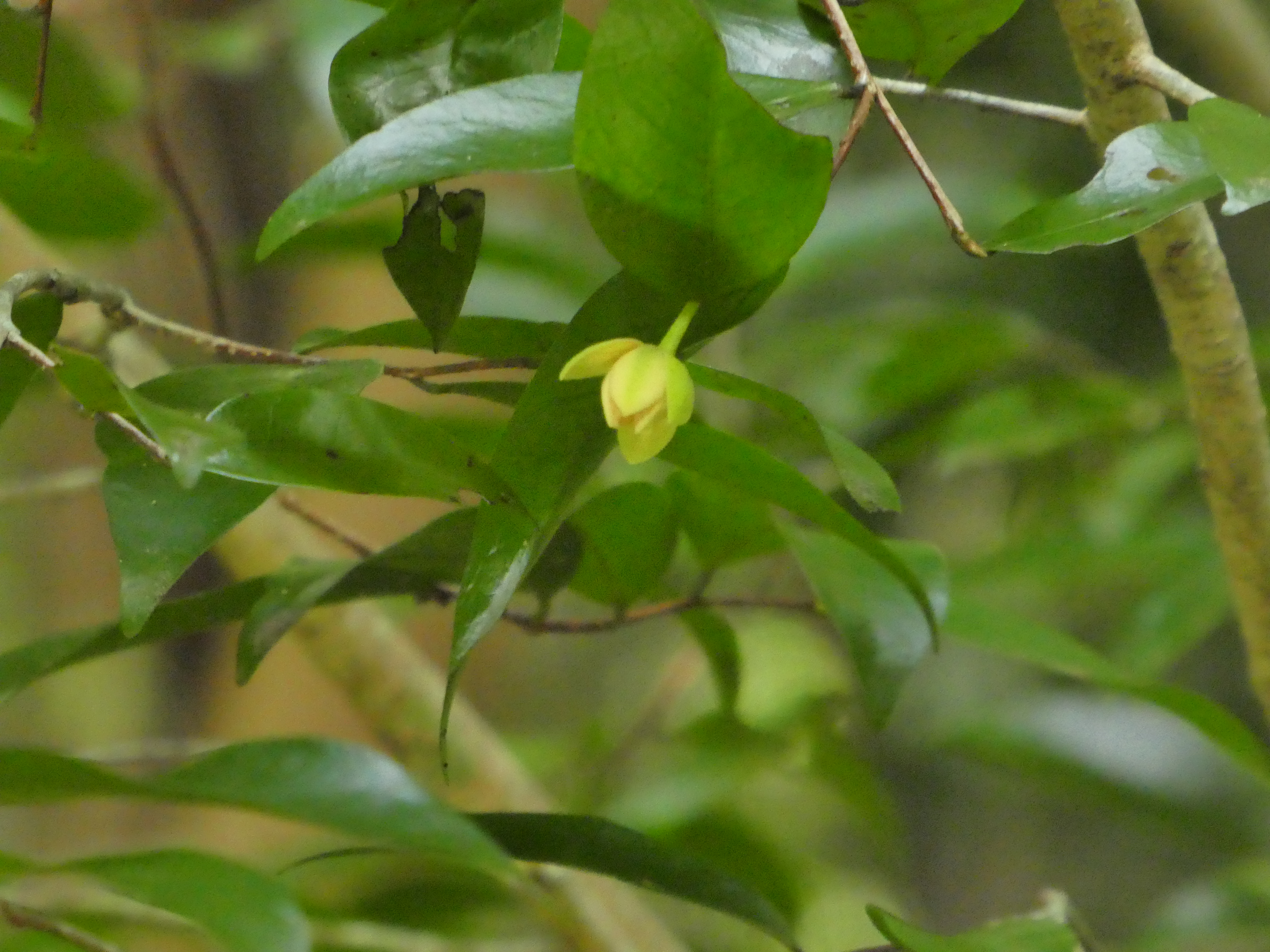
Flower and foliage

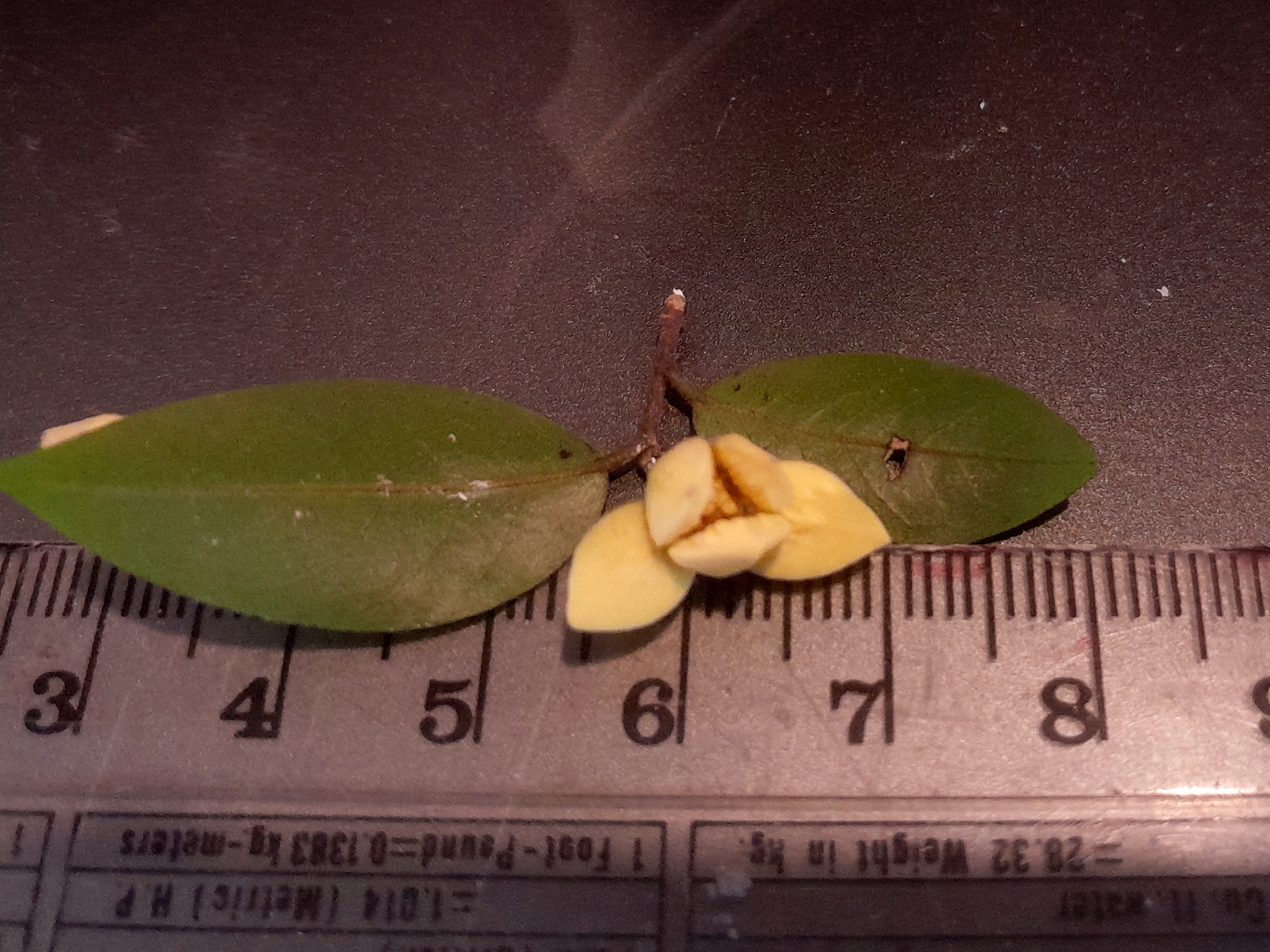

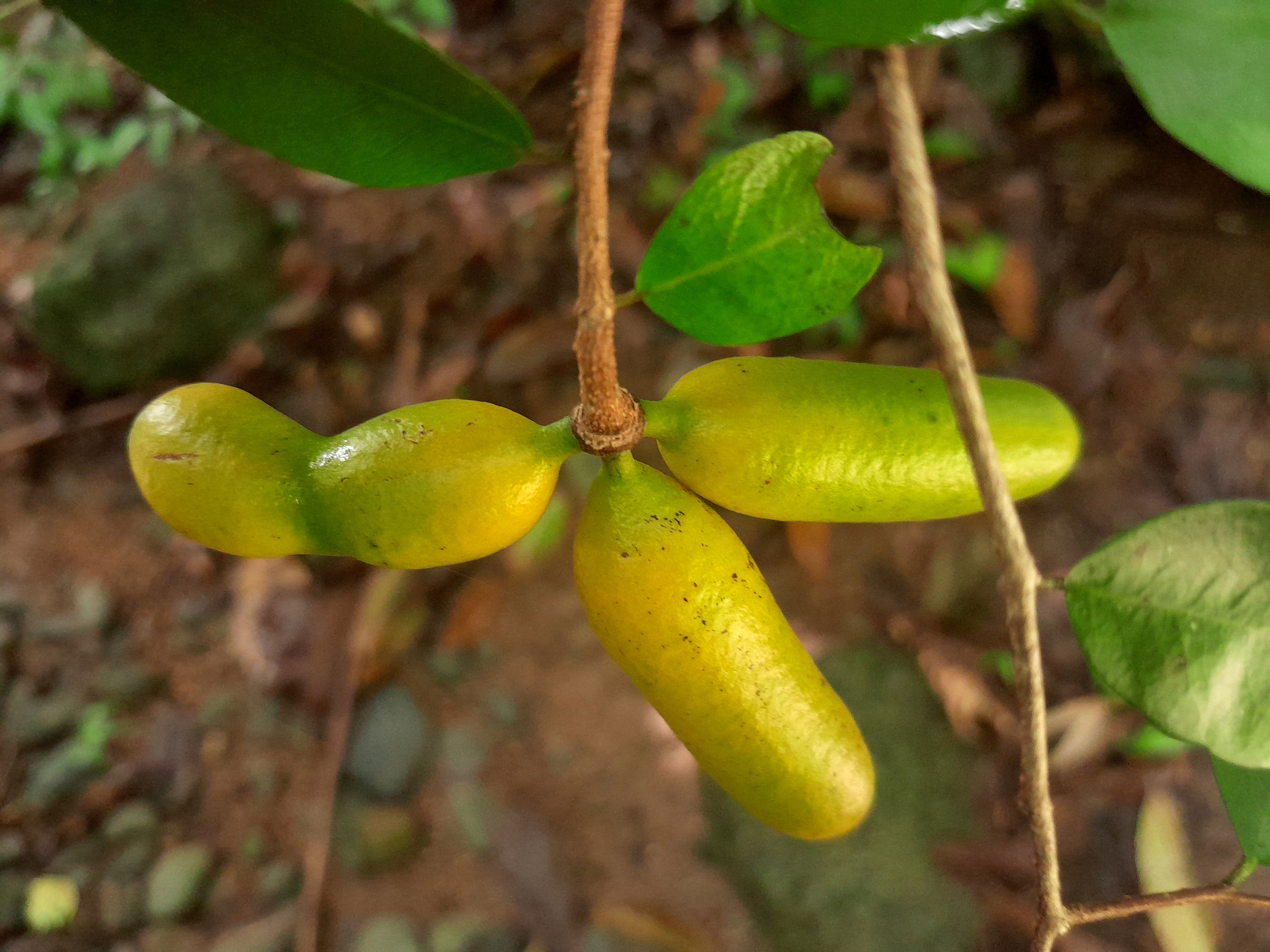
Unripe fruit

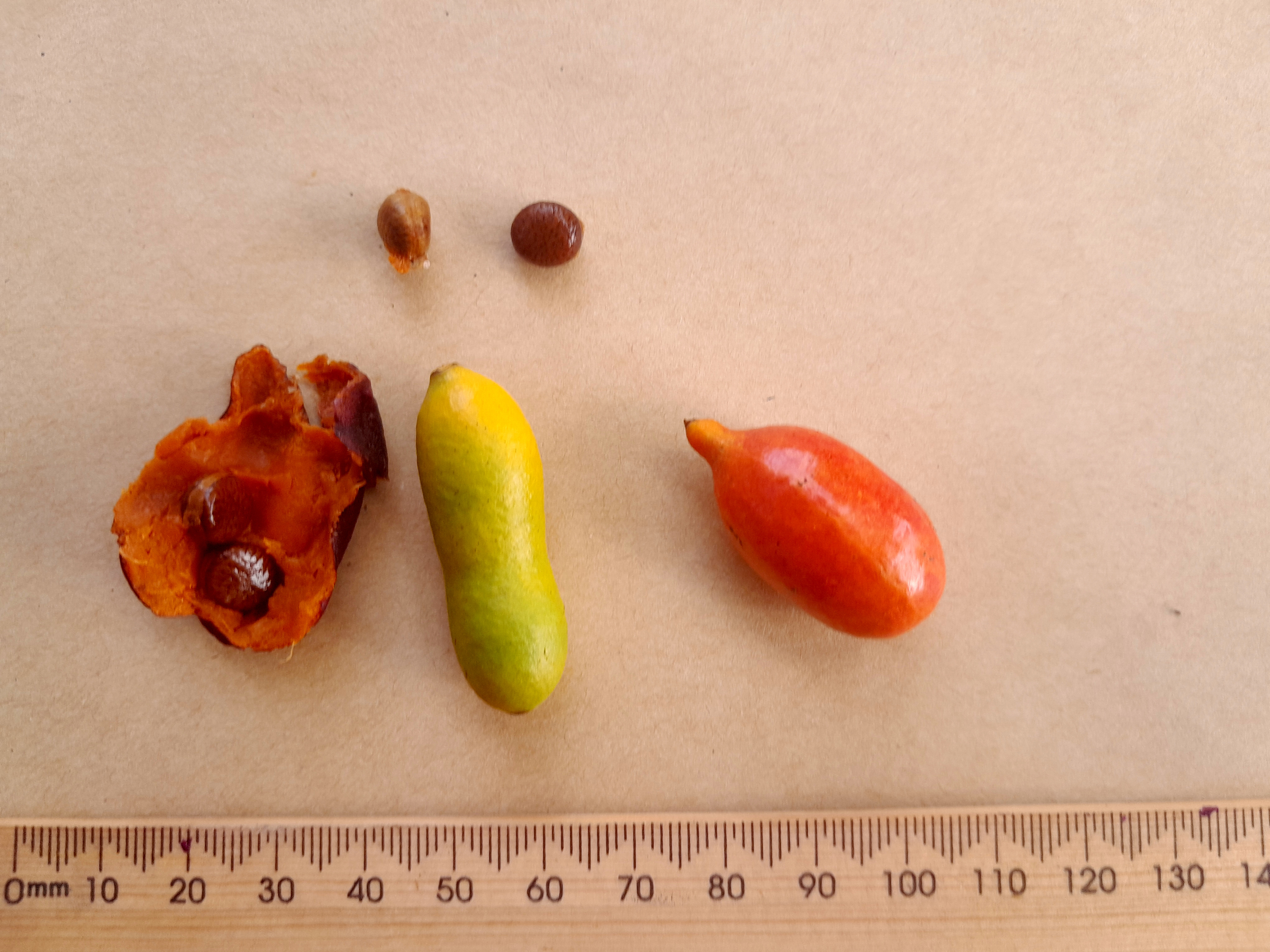
Fruit and seeds

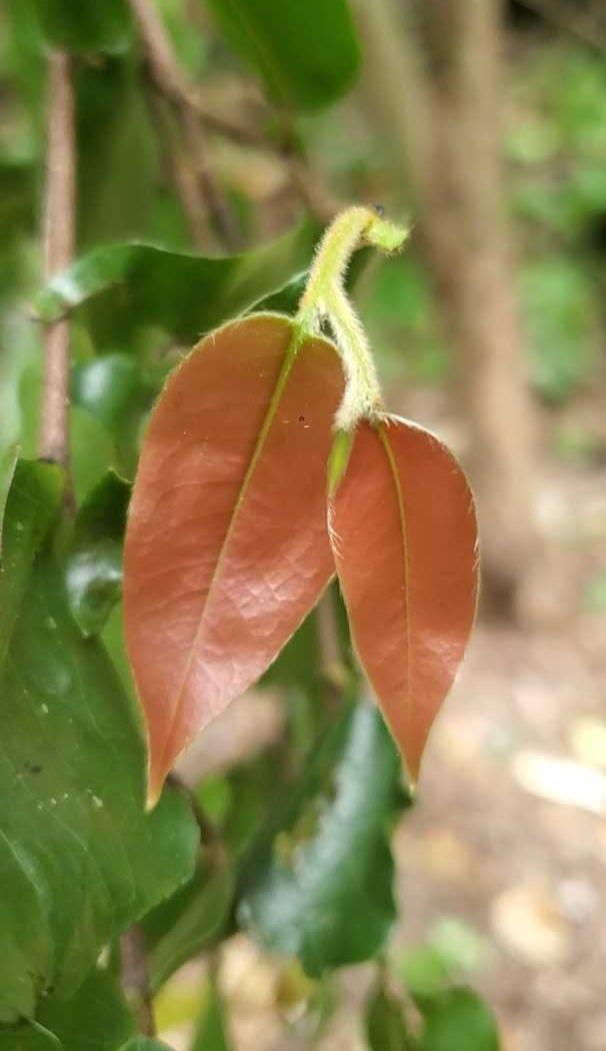
New leaves
