= Kani tribe =

Tribal community in India

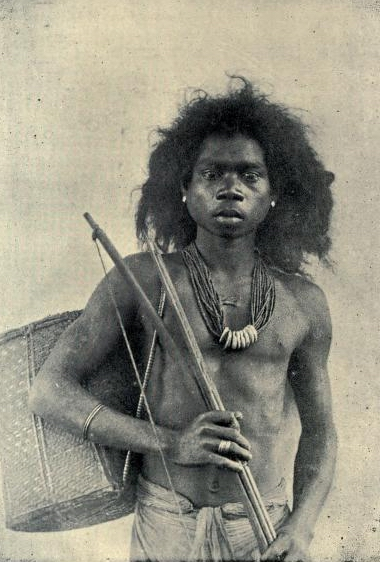
Kani man holding tools

Kani is a tribe living in the Western Ghats area of Kerala, India.

== Background ==
Their use of the forest plant arogyapacha (Trichopus zeylanicus) as a key ingredient in a herbal remedy called Jeevani was noted by visiting scientists in the 1980s. The formula was eventually developed as a commercial enterprise by Arya Vaidya Pharmacy, with the tribe's Kerala Kani Welfare Trust receiving license fees and royalties. Members have been encouraged to cultivate the plant. A recently discovered species of a tree-dwelling crab has been named Kani maranjandu after the tribe.
