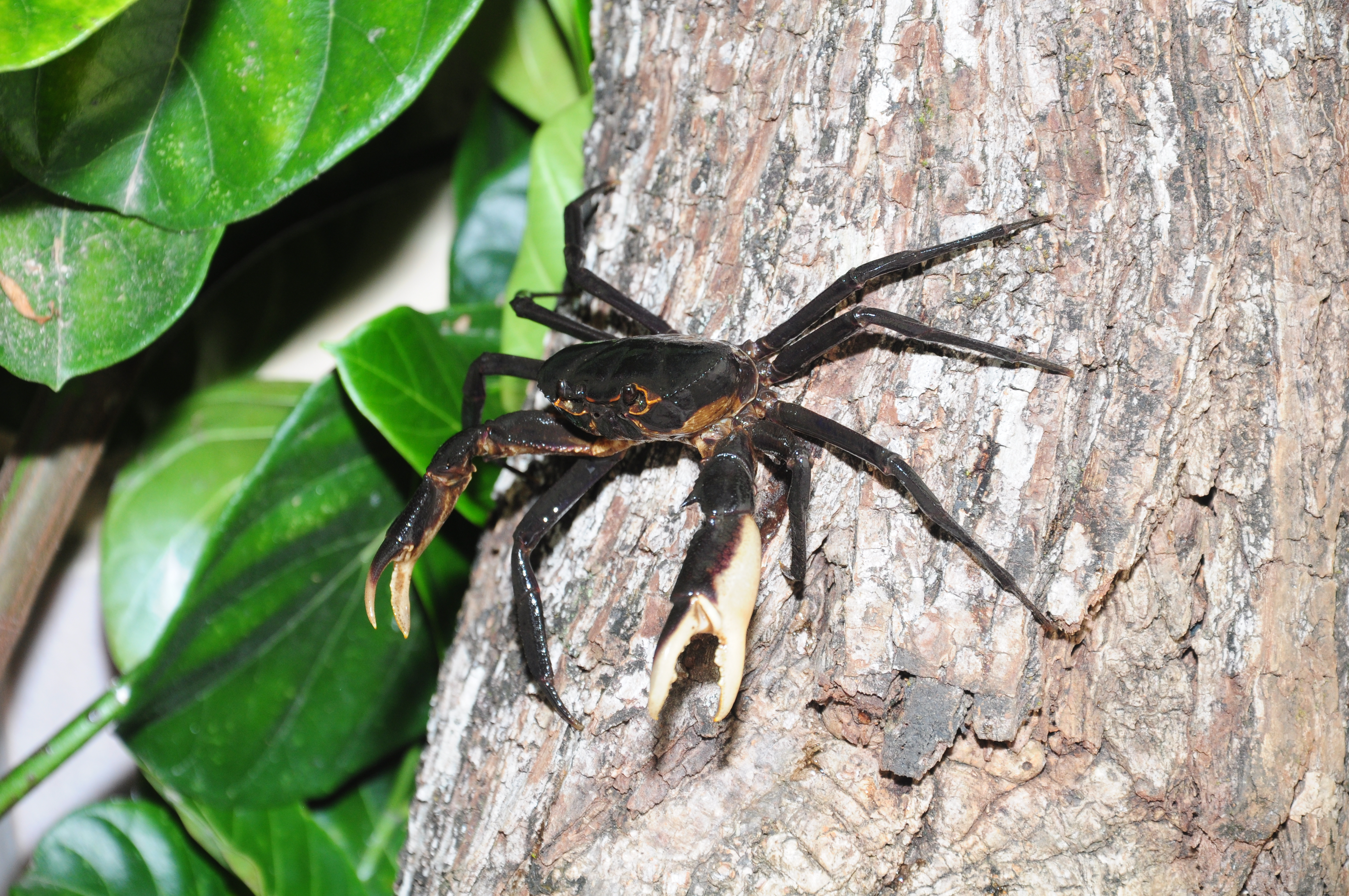

Scientific classification
- Kingdom: Animalia
- Phylum: Arthropoda
- Clade: Pancrustacea
- Class: Malacostraca
- Order: Decapoda
- Suborder: Pleocyemata
- Infraorder: Brachyura
- Family: Gecarcinucidae
- Genus: Kani; Kumar, Raj & Ng, 2017
- Species: K. maranjandu

Binomial name
- Kani maranjandu Kumar, Raj & Ng, 2017

= Kani maranjandu =

Species of crab

Kani maranjandu is a species of tree-dwelling crab first identified in 2017. K. maranjandu has, to date, only been observed in the forests of the Western Ghats in Kerala, India. As of 2021, it is the only species in the genus Kani.

== Taxonomy ==
Kani maranjandu represents a newly discovered genus (Kani), named for the local Kani tribe. The species name maranjandu means tree crab in local language (Malayalam). The discoverers have placed the genus within the family Gecarcinucidae.

== Characteristics ==
Kani maranjandu is distinguished from other crabs of the family Gecarcinidae by its distinctive carapace and the structure of the male abdomen, as well as its very long walking legs. The species is entirely arboreal, relying on water held in small hollows of trees for survival.

== Distribution ==
Kani maranjandu's type locality is the Thiruvananthapuram district of Kerala in the Western Ghats. It is endemic to this area.

== Habitat and Diet ==
Kani maranjandu inhabits water-filled tree hollows in the rainforest canopies of the southern Western Ghats in Kerala. It is believed to feed on organic debris, plant material, small insects, and other microorganisms found within these tree-hole microhabitats.
