= Kani (name) =

Kani is both a surname and a given name.

In Tamil Language, the word Kani gives the meaning of fruit. It is also used as name by Tamil people.

Notable people with the name include:

== Surname ==
- Atandwa Kani (21st century), South African actor
- John Kani (born 1943), South African actor, director and playwright
- Karl Kani American fashion designer
- Mohammad-Reza Mahdavi Kani (1931–2014), Iranian cleric and politician
- Kani Saizō (1554–1613), Japanese samurai

== Given name ==
- Kâni Karaca (1930–2004), Turkish musical artist
- Kani Kauahi (born 1959), American footballer
- Kani Vrana (1913–1984), Turkish judge
- Kani Thiru (born 1981), Indian actress
- Kani Walker (born 2003), American football player
