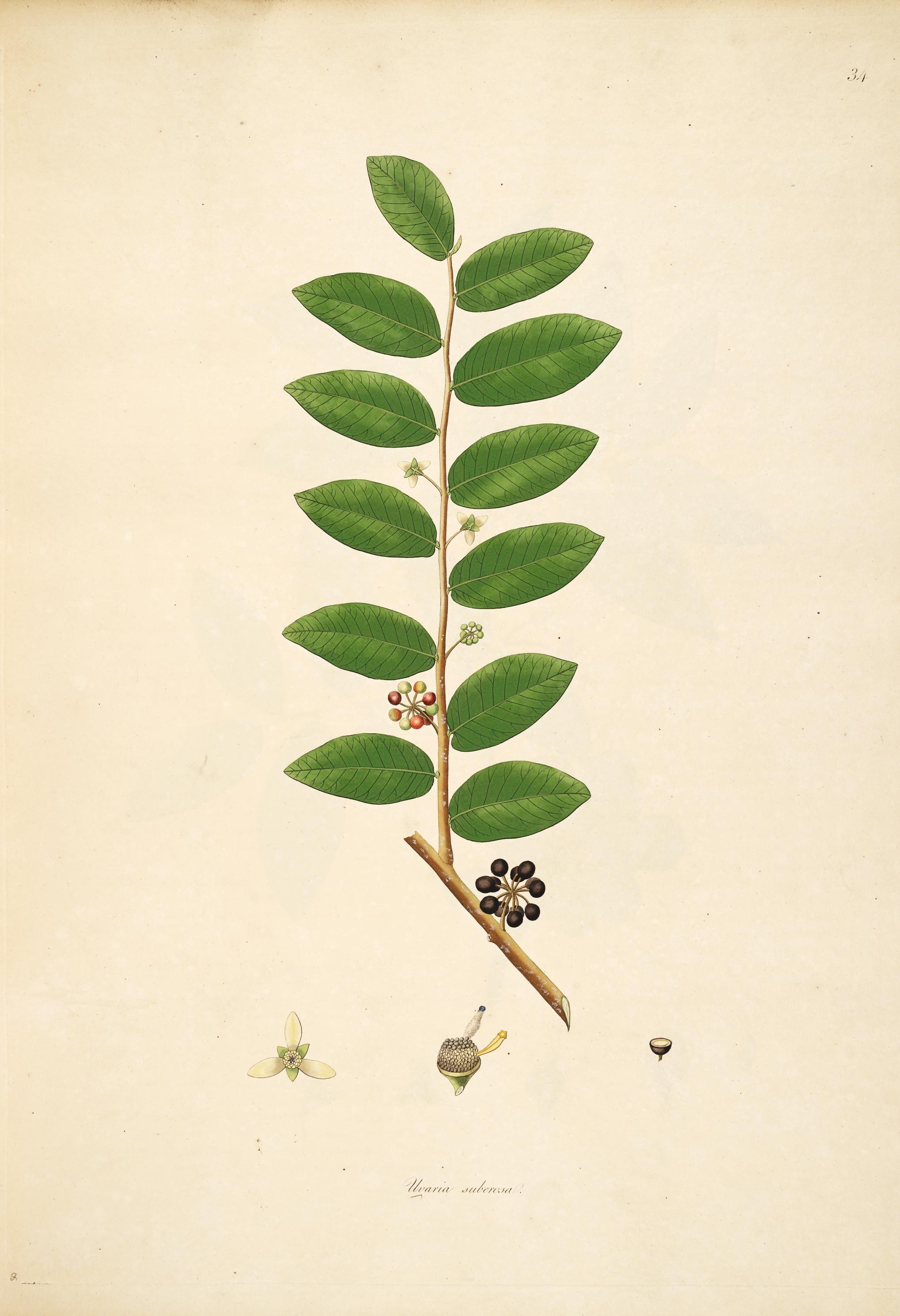
- Polyalthia suberosa
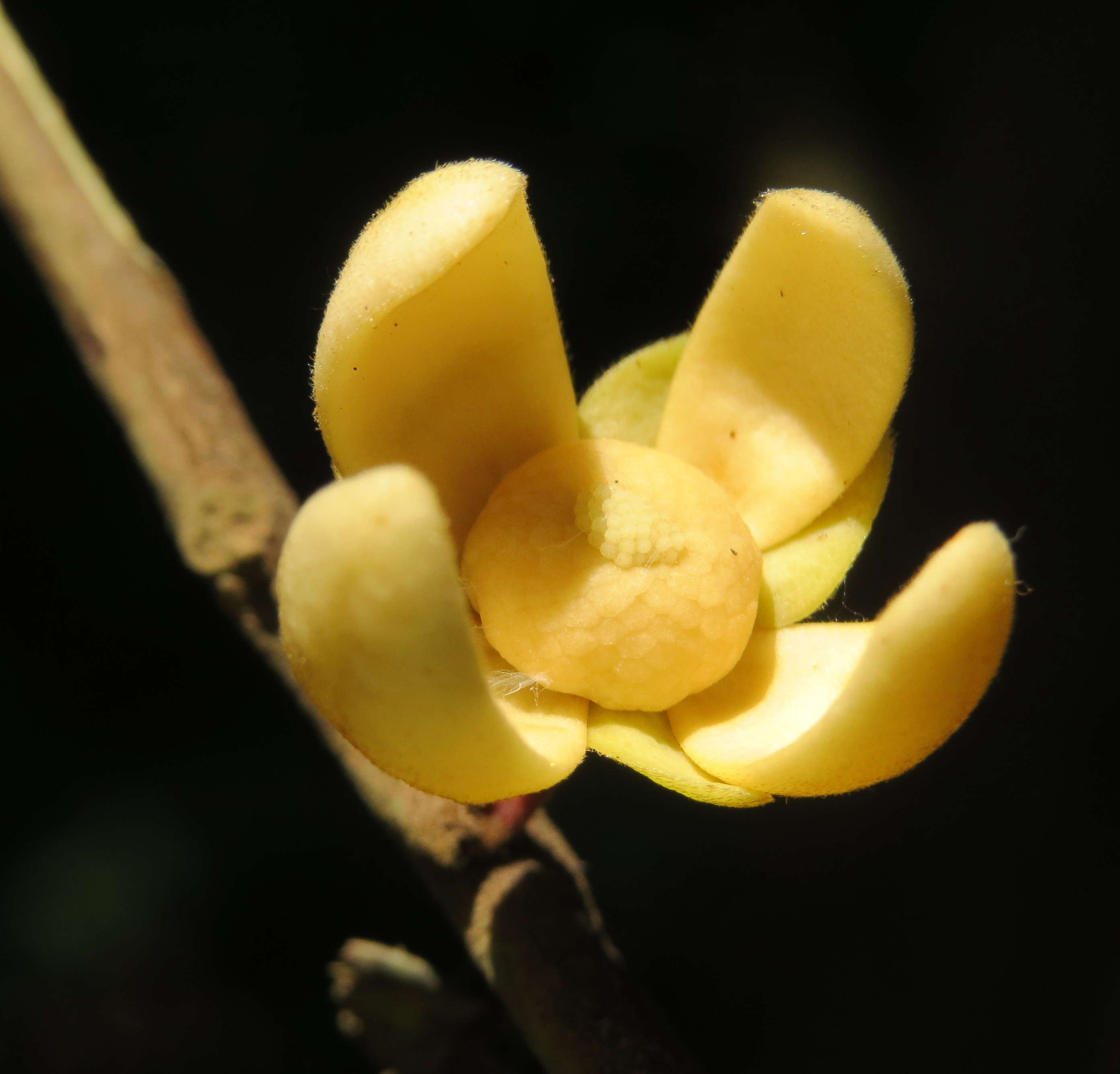
- P. suberosa flower

Scientific classification
- Kingdom: Plantae
- Clade: Tracheophytes
- Clade: Angiosperms
- Clade: Magnoliids
- Order: Magnoliales
- Family: Annonaceae
- Tribe: Miliuseae
- Genus: Polyalthia; Blume

Type species
- Polyalthia subcordata (Blume) Blume

Synonyms
- Haplostichanthus F.Muell.; Monostichanthus F.Muell.; Papualthia Diels; Sphaerothalamus Hook.f.; Tabraca Noronha

= Polyalthia =

Genus of flowering plants

Polyalthia is a genus of flowering plants in the family Annonaceae. There are approximately 90 species distributed from Africa to Asia and the Pacific.

These are trees and shrubs. The flower has six petals in two whorls, the inner petals curving inward over the centre.

The name Polyalthia is derived from a combination of Greek words meaning 'many cures' with reference to the medicinal properties of certain species.

== Species ==
This large genus was known to be polyphyletic, with many species having been separated and reassigned to other genera. Species have also been transferred into this genus (e.g. P. malabarica from Phaeanthus).

As of January 2025, Plants of the World Online accepts the following 98 species:

- Polyalthia angustissima Ridl.
- Polyalthia barenensis Bân
- Polyalthia borneensis Merr.
- Polyalthia bracteosa Bân
- Polyalthia bromantha I.M.Turner
- Polyalthia brunneifolia J.Sinclair
- Polyalthia bullata King
- Polyalthia cambodica (Finet & Gagnep.) Wiya & Chaowasku
- Polyalthia castanea Ridl.
- Polyalthia cauliflora Hook.f. & Thomson
- Polyalthia celebica Miq.
- Polyalthia chalermglinii Bunchalee & D.M.Johnson
- Polyalthia chantaranothaii Bunchalee & Chalermglin
- Polyalthia charitopoda I.M.Turner
- Polyalthia chayamaritiana Bunchalee & N.A.Murray
- Polyalthia chinii I.M.Turner & Utteridge
- Polyalthia chrysotricha Ridl.
- Polyalthia cinnamomea Hook.f. & Thomson
- Polyalthia clemensiorum Jovet-Ast
- Polyalthia corticosa (Pierre) Finet & Gagnep.
- Polyalthia debilis (Pierre) Finet & Gagnep.
- Polyalthia dictyoneura Diels
- Polyalthia dolichopoda I.M.Turner
- Polyalthia dumosa King
- Polyalthia elegans K.Schum. & Lauterb.
- Polyalthia elliptica (Blume) Blume
- Polyalthia endertii D.M.Johnson
- Polyalthia evecta (Pierre) Finet & Gagnep.
- Polyalthia flagellaris (Becc.) Airy Shaw
- Polyalthia fruticosa (Jessup) B.Xue & R.M.K.Saunders
- Polyalthia gamopetala Boerl. ex Koord.-Schum.
- Polyalthia gracilicolumnaris H.Okada, Tsukaya & Suleiman
- Polyalthia gracilipes Merr.
- Polyalthia guabatuensis I.M.Turner & Utteridge
- Polyalthia guamusangensis I.M.Turner & Utteridge
- Polyalthia heliopetala Leerat. & Bunchalee
- Polyalthia hirtifolia J.Sinclair
- Polyalthia hispida B.Xue & R.M.K.Saunders
- Polyalthia ichthyosma I.M.Turner
- Polyalthia igniflora D.M.Johnson
- Polyalthia insignis (Hook.f.) Airy Shaw
- Polyalthia intermedia (Pierre) Bân
- Polyalthia johnsonii (F.Muell.) B.Xue & R.M.K.Saunders
- Polyalthia kanchanaburiana Khumch. & Thongp.
- Polyalthia khaoyaiensis Bunchalee & Chantar.
- Polyalthia kinabaluensis I.M.Turner
- Polyalthia lanceolata S.Vidal
- Polyalthia lancilimba C.Y.Wu ex P.T.Li
- Polyalthia lasioclada I.M.Turner
- Polyalthia lateritia J.Sinclair
- Polyalthia longipedicellata (Alister, G.Rajkumar, Nazarudeen & Pandur.) Shailaj., B.Parthipan, A.K.Sreekala & E.S.S.Kumar
- Polyalthia longipes (Miq.) Koord. & Valeton
- Polyalthia longirostris (Scheff.) B.Xue & R.M.K.Saunders
- Polyalthia luzonensis B.Xue & R.M.K.Saunders
- Polyalthia malabarica (Bedd.) I.M.Turner
- Polyalthia meghalayensis V.Prakash & Mehrotra
- Polyalthia microsepala Diels
- Polyalthia microtus Miq.
- Polyalthia miliusoides I.M.Turner
- Polyalthia mindorensis Merr.
- Polyalthia miniata Teijsm. & Binn.
- Polyalthia minima Jovet-Ast
- Polyalthia minutiflora Elmer
- Polyalthia monocarpioides I.M.Turner
- Polyalthia montis-silam D.M.Johnson
- Polyalthia moonii Thwaites
- Polyalthia motleyana (Hook.f.) Airy Shaw
- Polyalthia myristica I.M.Turner
- Polyalthia novoguineensis (H.Okada) B.Xue & R.M.K.Saunders
- Polyalthia obliqua Hook.f. & Thomson
- Polyalthia oblonga King
- Polyalthia pakdin I.M.Turner & Utteridge
- Polyalthia parviflora Ridl.
- Polyalthia persicifolia (Hook.f. & Thomson) Bedd.
- Polyalthia pisocarpa (Hassk.) I.M.Turner
- Polyalthia polyphlebia Diels
- Polyalthia praeflorens Bân
- Polyalthia pumila Ridl.
- Polyalthia rufescens Hook.f. & Thomson
- Polyalthia saprosma I.M.Turner
- Polyalthia sessiliflora (Ast) Bân
- Polyalthia socia Craib
- Polyalthia spathulata (Teijsm. & Binn.) Boerl.
- Polyalthia stellata (Heusden) B.Xue & R.M.K.Saunders
- Polyalthia stenopetala (Hook.f. & Thomson) Finet & Gagnep.
- Polyalthia stenophylla I.M.Turner
- Polyalthia subcordata (Blume) Blume
- Polyalthia suberosa (Roxb.) Thwaites
- Polyalthia submontana (Jessup) B.Xue & R.M.K.Saunders
- Polyalthia suthepensis Wiya & Chaowasku
- Polyalthia sympetala I.M.Turner
- Polyalthia taweensis Bunchalee & Leerat.
- Polyalthia tipuliflora D.M.Johnson
- Polyalthia trochilia I.M.Turner
- Polyalthia venosa Merr.
- Polyalthia watui K.M.Wong
- Polyalthia xanthocarpa B.Xue & R.M.K.Saunders
- Polyalthia yingjiangensis Y.H.Tan & B.Xue

=== Reassigned to other genera ===
According to Plants of the World Online, species have been placed in the following genera:

- Disepalum
  - Polyalthia pingpienensis P.T.Li – synonym of Disepalum plagioneurum (Diels) D.M.Johnson
- Huberantha Chaowasku
  - Polyalthia cerasoides (Roxb.) Bedd. – synonym of Huberantha cerasoides (Roxb.) Chaowasku
  - Polyalthia korinti (Dunal) Benth. & J. Hk. ex J. Hk. & Thoms – synonym of Huberantha korinti (Dunal) Chaowasku
  - Polyalthia nitidissima – synonym of Huberantha nitidissima (Dunal) Chaowasku
  - Polyalthia palawanensis Merr. – synonym of Huberantha palawanensis (Merr.) I.M.Turner
- Meiogyne
  - Polyalthia laddiana A.C.Sm. – synonym of Meiogyne laddiana (A.C.Sm.) B.Xue & R.M.K.Saunders
- Monoon Miq.
  - Polyalthia coffeoides (Hook.f. & Th.) – synonym of Monoon coffeoides (Thwaites ex Hook.f. & Thomson) B.Xue & R.M.K.Saunders
  - Polyalthia fragrans (Dalz.) Bedd. – synonym of Monoon fragrans (Dalzell) B.Xue & R.M.K.Saunders
  - Polyalthia glabra (Hook.f. & Th.) James Sincl. – synonym of Monoon glabrum (Hook.f. & Thomson) B.Xue & R.M.K.Saunders
  - Polyalthia hookeriana King – synonym of Monoon hookerianum (King) B.Xue & R.M.K.Saunders
  - Polyalthia hypogaea King – synonym of Monoon hypogaeum (King) B.Xue & R.M.K.Saunders
  - Polyalthia longifolia (Sonn.) Thwaites – synonym of Monoon longifolium (Sonn.) B.Xue & R.M.K.Saunders
  - Polyalthia pachyphylla King – synonym of Monoon pachyphyllum (King) B.Xue & R.M.K.Saunders
  - Polyalthia shendurunii Basha & Sasi. is now Monoon shendurunii (Basha & Sasidh.) B.Xue & R.M.K.Saunders
  - Polyalthia simiarum (Buch.-Ham. ex Hook.f. & Thomson) Hook.f. & Thomson – synonym of Monoon simiarum (Buch.-Ham. ex Hook.f. & Thomson) B.Xue & R.M.K.Saunders
- Phaeanthus
  - Polyalthia macropoda King – synonym of Phaeanthus ophthalmicus (Roxb. ex G.Don) J.Sinclair
- Polyalthiopsis Chaowasku
  - Polyalthia floribunda Jovet-Ast – synonym of Polyalthiopsis floribunda (Jovet-Ast) Chaowasku (Vietnam)
- Wuodendron B.Xue, Y.H.Tan & Chaowasku (monotypic)
  - Polyalthia litseifolia C.Y.Wu ex P.T.Li – synonym of Wuodendron praecox (Hook.f. & Thomson) B.Xue, Y.H.Tan & X.L.Hou
