= P. malabaricus =

P. malabaricus may refer to:

- Phaeanthus malabaricus, a plant species
- Pseudorhabdosynochus malabaricus, a fish parasite
- Psilopogon malabaricus, the Malabar barbet, a fish species
