= Polyalthia elmeri =

Conservation status
- Vulnerable (IUCN 2.3)

Scientific classification
- Kingdom: Plantae
- Clade: Tracheophytes
- Clade: Angiosperms
- Clade: Magnoliids
- Order: Magnoliales
- Family: Annonaceae
- Genus: Polyalthia
- Species: P. elmeri

Binomial name
- Polyalthia elmeri Merr.

Species of flowering plant

Polyalthia elmeri is a species of plant in the Annonaceae family. It is endemic to the Philippines.
