= Polyalthia macropoda =

Polyalthia macropoda is a taxon synonym for two species of flowering plants:

- Polyalthia macropoda King, a synonym of Monoon borneense (H.Okada) B.Xue & R.M.K.Saunders
- Polyalthia macropoda (Miq.) F.Muell., a synonym of Phaeanthus ophthalmicus (Roxb. ex G.Don) J.Sinclair
