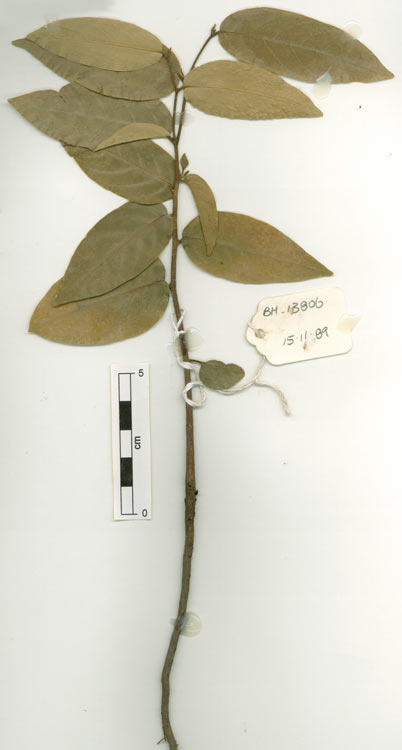
- Seedling

Conservation status
- Least Concern (IUCN 3.1)

Scientific classification
- Kingdom: Plantae
- Clade: Tracheophytes
- Clade: Angiosperms
- Clade: Magnoliids
- Order: Magnoliales
- Family: Annonaceae
- Genus: Monoon
- Species: M. australe

Binomial name
- Monoon australe (Benth.) B.Xue & R.M.K.Saunders

Synonyms
- Polyalthia australis (Benth.) Jessup; Popowia australis Benth.; Polyalthia armitiana F.Muell. ex F.M.Bailey; Polyalthia holtzeana F.Muell.

= Monoon australe =

Cape canary beech

Species of flowering plant

Monoon australe is a plant in the custard apple family Annonaceae found in the northern parts of the Australian states of Western Australia, the Northern Territory and Queensland. It was originally described as Popowia australis by the English botanist George Bentham in 1863, but it was transferred to its current combination in 2012 in a review of the closely related genus Polyalthia conducted by the botanist Bine Xue and others.

== Conservation ==
As of September 2024, this species has been assessed to be of least concern by the International Union for Conservation of Nature (IUCN) and by the Queensland Government under its Nature Conservation Act.
