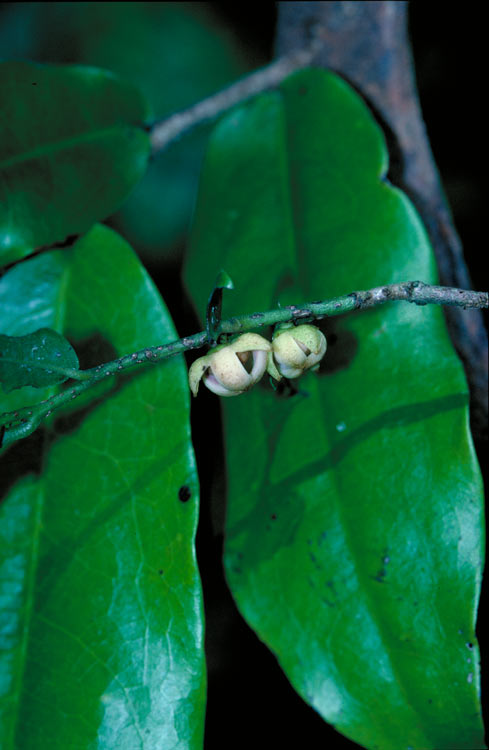
- Flowers and foliage

Conservation status
- Least Concern (NCA)

Scientific classification
- Kingdom: Plantae
- Clade: Tracheophytes
- Clade: Angiosperms
- Clade: Magnoliids
- Order: Magnoliales
- Family: Annonaceae
- Genus: Polyalthia
- Species: P. xanthocarpa

Binomial name
- Polyalthia xanthocarpa B.Xue & R.M.K.Saunders

Synonyms
- Haplostichanthus ramiflorus Jessup

= Polyalthia xanthocarpa =

Species of flowering plant

Polyalthia xanthocarpa is a species of plants in the custard apple family Annonaceae. It is endemic to the coastal lowlands between the Daintree River and Cape Tribulation in Queensland, Australia. It is a shrub to about 4 m (13 ft) tall, first described (as Haplostichanthus ramiflorus) in 2007 and transferred to its current name in 2012. It is listed as least concern under the Queensland Government's Nature Conservation Act.
