= Polyalthia angustissima =

Conservation status
- Data Deficient (IUCN 2.3)

Scientific classification
- Kingdom: Plantae
- Clade: Embryophytes
- Clade: Tracheophytes
- Clade: Spermatophytes
- Clade: Angiosperms
- Clade: Magnoliids
- Order: Magnoliales
- Family: Annonaceae
- Genus: Polyalthia
- Species: P. angustissima

Binomial name
- Polyalthia angustissima Ridl.

Species of tree

Polyalthia angustissima is a species of flowering plant in the Annonaceae family. It is a tree found in Malaysia, Singapore, and Vietnam.
