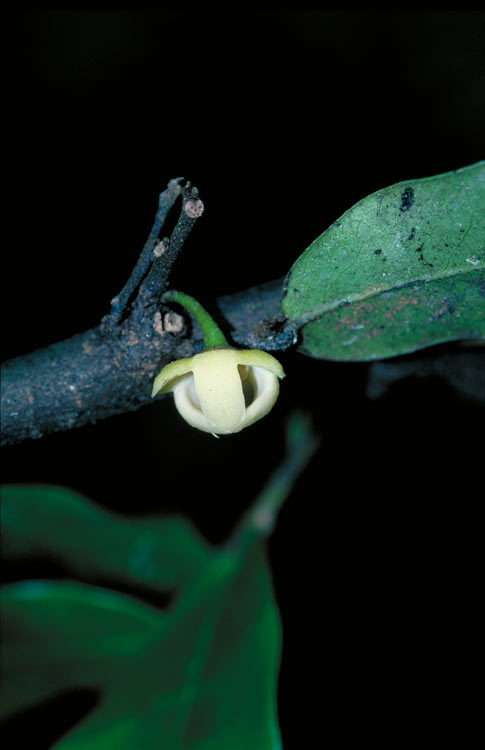
- Flower

Conservation status
- Least Concern (NCA)

Scientific classification
- Kingdom: Plantae
- Clade: Tracheophytes
- Clade: Angiosperms
- Clade: Magnoliids
- Order: Magnoliales
- Family: Annonaceae
- Genus: Polyalthia
- Species: P. johnsonii

Binomial name
- Polyalthia johnsonii (F.Muell.) B.Xue & R.M.K.Saunders
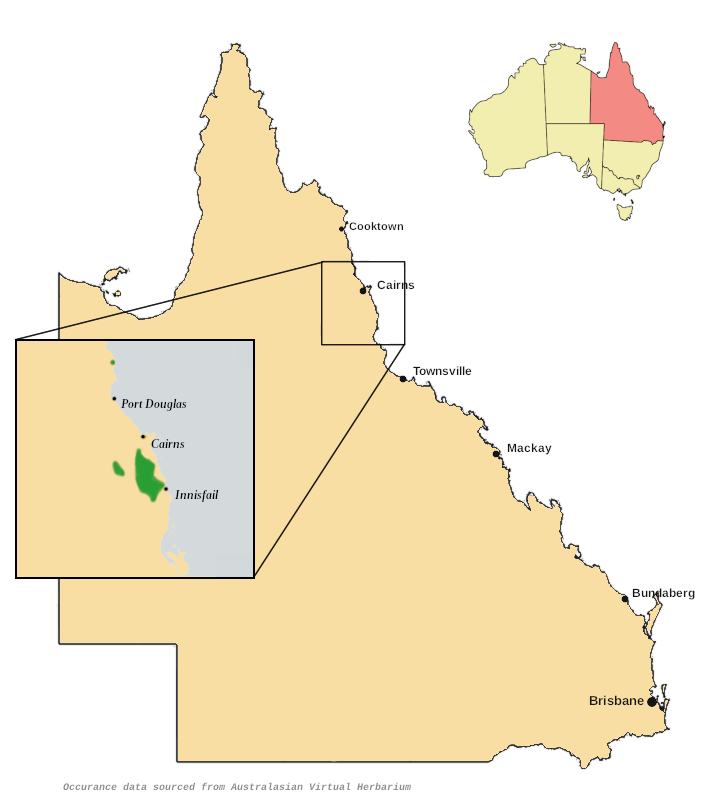

Synonyms
- Haplostichanthus johnsonii F.Muell.; Monostichanthus johnsonii F.Muell.

= Polyalthia johnsonii =

Species of flowering plant

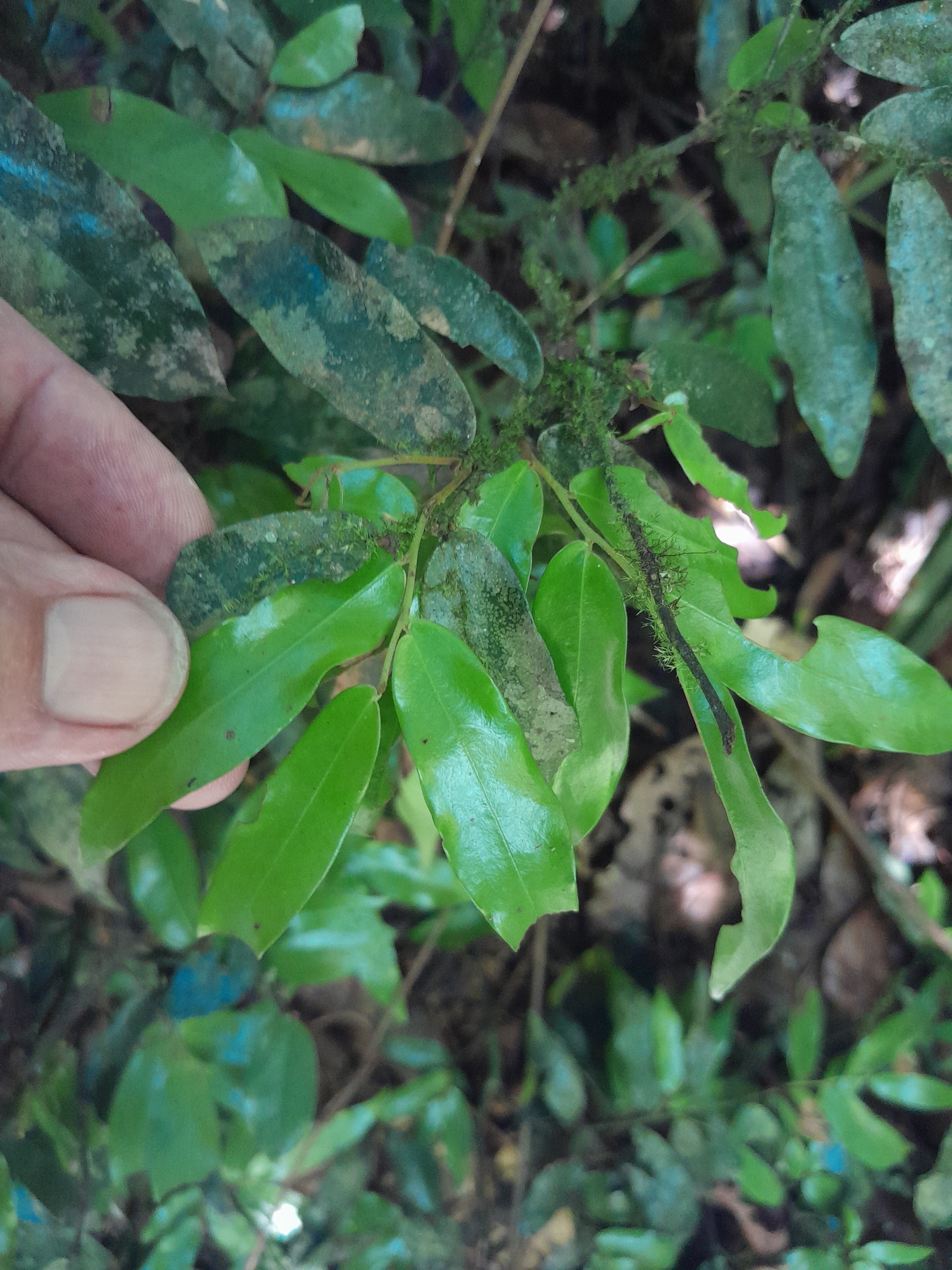
Foliage

Polyalthia johnsonii is a species of plants in the custard apple family Annonaceae. It is restricted to a small part of the Wet Tropics bioregion of Queensland, Australia.

== Description ==
Polyalthia johnsonii is a shrub to about 4 m (13 ft) tall. The leaves are up to 10 cm (3.9 in) long by 3 cm (1.2 in) wide, dark green and smooth on the upper surface and paler below, and they are held on a petiole, or leaf stem, about 3 mm (0.12 in) long. There are six to nine pairs of inconspicuous lateral veins either side of the midrib, and oil dots are visible with a lens. The leaf base is rounded and asymmetric, the tip is acute.

Flowers are either solitary or in clusters, produced in the leaf axils. They are small, about 10 mm (0.39 in) diameter, and have six cream petals arranged in two whorls of three. The inner whorl arch forward and join at their tips, forming a 'roof' over the flower centre. There are about 30–40 stamens about 1 mm (0.04 in) long, and six ovaries each with two ovules.

The fruit is a berry, or an aggregate of berries, each black, about 18 mm (0.71 in) long and 16 mm (0.63 in) wide, containing up to two seeds about 7 by 4 mm (0.28 by 0.16 in).

=== Phenology ===
Flowering occurs from around October through to March or April, and fruit ripen between May and December.

== Taxoonomy ==
This species was first described in 1891 by the German-born Australian botanist Ferdinand von Mueller, and was published in the journal The Victorian Naturalist. In 2012, Bine Xue et al. published a paper discussing the polyphyly of Polyalthia and some other genera in the Annonaceae family, in which this species was renamed and given its current binomial.

=== Etymology ===
The species epithet johnsonii honours the collector of the first specimens of this plant, zoologist Stephen Johnson.

== Distribution and habitat ==
Polyalthia johnsonii is endemic to a very small part of Queensland. It is found in the foothills and the lowlands around the two highest mountains in Queensland, Mount Bartle Frere and Mount Bellenden Ker, where it inhabits well developed rainforest.

== Conservation ==
This species is listed as least concern under the Queensland Government's Nature Conservation Act. As of 14 April 2025, it has not been assessed by the International Union for Conservation of Nature (IUCN).
