= Monoon shendurunii =

Conservation status
- Endangered (IUCN 2.3)

Scientific classification
- Kingdom: Plantae
- Clade: Embryophytes
- Clade: Tracheophytes
- Clade: Spermatophytes
- Clade: Angiosperms
- Clade: Magnoliids
- Order: Magnoliales
- Family: Annonaceae
- Genus: Monoon
- Species: M. shendurunii

Binomial name
- Monoon shendurunii (Basha & Sasidh.) B.Xue & R.M.K.Saunders

Synonyms
- Polyalthia shendurunii Basha & Sasidh.

Species of flowering plant

Monoon shendurunii is a species of flowering plant in the Annonaceae family. It is endemic to Kerala in India. It was reclassified from the genus Polyalthia to Monoon.
