= Polyalthia rufescens =

Conservation status
- Endangered (IUCN 2.3)

Scientific classification
- Kingdom: Plantae
- Clade: Embryophytes
- Clade: Tracheophytes
- Clade: Spermatophytes
- Clade: Angiosperms
- Clade: Magnoliids
- Order: Magnoliales
- Family: Annonaceae
- Genus: Polyalthia
- Species: P. rufescens

Binomial name
- Polyalthia rufescens Hook.f. & Thomson

Species of flowering plant

Polyalthia rufescens is a species of flowering plant in the Annonaceae family. It is a tree native to the Western Ghats Kerala and Tamil Nadu in India. It is threatened by habitat loss.
