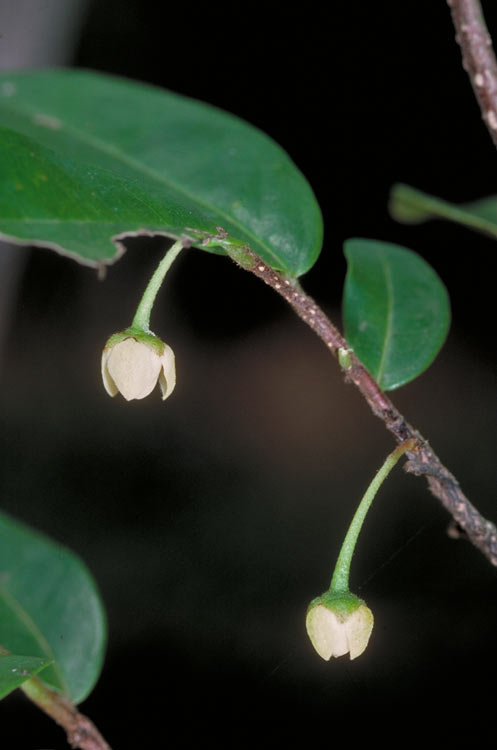
- Flowers

Conservation status
- Least Concern (NCA)

Scientific classification
- Kingdom: Plantae
- Clade: Tracheophytes
- Clade: Angiosperms
- Clade: Magnoliids
- Order: Magnoliales
- Family: Annonaceae
- Genus: Polyalthia
- Species: P. fruticosa

Binomial name
- Polyalthia fruticosa (Jessup) B.Xue & R.M.K.Saunders

Synonyms
- Haplostichanthus fruticosus Jessup

= Polyalthia fruticosa =

Species of flowering plant

Polyalthia fruticosa is a plant in the custard apple family Annonaceae found only in the northern half of Cape York Peninsula, Queensland, from the Torres Strait to the McIlwraith Range. It is a shrub up to 3 m (9.8 ft) tall, producing white flowers and red fruit. It was first described in 2007 as Haplostichanthus fruticosus by the Australian botanist Lawrence W. Jessup, and transferred to the genus Polyalthia in 2018 in a broad taxonomic review of the genus by Xue et al.

It is one of the host plants for larvae of the green-spotted triangle butterfly (Graphium agamemnon).

== Conservation ==
This species is listed by the Queensland Government's Department of Environment, Science and Innovation as least concern. As of October 2024, it has not been assessed by the International Union for Conservation of Nature (IUCN).
