= Polyalthia hirtifolia =

Conservation status
- Critically Endangered (IUCN 3.1)

Scientific classification
- Kingdom: Plantae
- Clade: Embryophytes
- Clade: Tracheophytes
- Clade: Spermatophytes
- Clade: Angiosperms
- Clade: Magnoliids
- Order: Magnoliales
- Family: Annonaceae
- Genus: Polyalthia
- Species: P. hirtifolia

Binomial name
- Polyalthia hirtifolia J.Sinclair

Species of tree

Polyalthia hirtifolia is a species of flowering plant in the family Annonaceae. It is a tree endemic to Peninsular Malaysia. It is threatened by habitat loss.
