= Monoon harmandii =

Scientific classification
- Kingdom: Plantae
- Clade: Tracheophytes
- Clade: Angiosperms
- Clade: Magnoliids
- Order: Magnoliales
- Family: Annonaceae
- Subfamily: Malmeoideae
- Tribe: Miliuseae
- Genus: Monoon
- Species: M. harmandii

Binomial name
- Monoon harmandii (Pierre) B.Xue & R.M.K.Saunders

Synonyms
- Polyalthia harmandii (Pierre) Finet & Gagnep.; Unona harmandii Pierre (basionym)

Species of plant

Monoon harmandii is an Asian tree species in the family Annonaceae and tribe Miliuseae. It is endemic to Vietnam, where it may be called nhọc lá lớn (or quần đầu Harmand) and was named by Jean Baptiste Louis Pierre of the Saigon Botanic Gardens.
