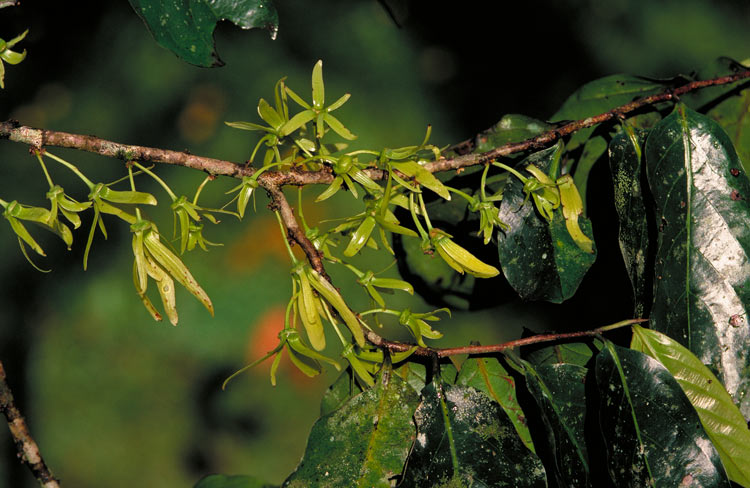
- Flowers

Conservation status
- Least Concern (IUCN 3.1)

Scientific classification
- Kingdom: Plantae
- Clade: Tracheophytes
- Clade: Angiosperms
- Clade: Magnoliids
- Order: Magnoliales
- Family: Annonaceae
- Genus: Monoon
- Species: M. michaelii

Binomial name
- Monoon michaelii (C.T.White) B.Xue & R.M.K.Saunders

Synonyms
- Polyalthia michaelii C.T.White

= Monoon michaelii =

Canary beech

Species of flowering plant

Monoon michaelii is a plant in the custard apple family Annonaceae found only in a very small part of the Wet Tropics bioregion of Queensland, Australia. It was originally described as Polyalthia michaelii in 1915 and transferred to its current name in 2012.

== Description ==
Monoon michaelii is a tree to 30 m (98 ft) tall, the shoots and young branches are covered in soft fine hairs. The leaves are arranged alternately on the twigs and held on a petiole up to 9 mm (0.35 in) long. The leaves are mostly glabrous and measure up to 19 cm (7.5 in) long by 7 cm (2.8 in) wide. They are elliptic to ovate or lanceolate, with 5‍–‍10 lateral veins either side of the midrib.

The inflorescences take the form of a fascicle or raceme, are produced in the leaf axils or directly from the branches (a process known as ramiflory). They bear up to six flowers, each with two whorls of three cream to yellow petals — the outer petals smaller, about 25 mm (1 in) long and 5 mm (0.2 in) wide, inner petals up to 65 mm (2.6 in) long and 11 mm (0.4 in) wide. There are about 60 stamens, all about 1 mm (0.04 in) long, and about 20 carpels about 0.7 mm (0.03 in) long.

The fruit is an aggregate fruit of botanical berries — in other words, it appears as a cluster of individual fruitlets, each of which has developed from one of the carpels from a single flower. The fruitlets are orange, measure about 6 cm (2.4 in) long and 5 cm (2.0 in) wide, and contain one brown, shallowly-wrinkled seed about 4 by 2.5 cm (1.6 by 1.0 in).

=== Phenology ===
Flowering occurs from November to March, and fruit appear from May to December.

== Taxonomy ==
This plant was first described – as Polyalthia michaelii – in 2015 by the Australian botanist Cyril Tenison White. Almost a century later, botanists Bine Xue, Richard M.K. Saunders, et al. reviewed the genus Polyalthia, and in the process they gave this species the new combination Monoon michaelii.

=== Etymology ===
The species epithet michaelii is in honour of Norman Michael, an Anglican minister and active plant collector in Queensland. He collected the type specimen of this species.

== Distribution and habitat ==
Monoon michaelii is restricted to a very small area of northeastern Queensland, mostly contained within the boundaries of the Wet Tropics World Heritage Area. It inhabits rainforest around Mt Bartle Frere and Mt Bellenden Ker, in the catchments of the North and South Johnstone, the Russell and the Mulgrave Rivers, mostly on the coastal plains but ascending up to the edge of the Atherton Tableland. The altitudinal range is from sea level to about 750 m (2,460 ft), and the total "area of occupancy" is just 198 km^{2} (76 sq mi). (Note: For a definition of Area of Occupancy see this page at the Atlas of Living Australia)

== Ecology ==
This plant serves as a host for the larvae of the green-spotted triangle (Graphium agamemnon), pale green triangle (Graphium eurypylus), and green triangle (Graphium macfarlanei) butterflies. Fruit are eaten by cassowaries (Casuarius casuarius) and spectacled flying foxes (Pteropus conspicillatus).

== Conservation ==
As of September 2024, this species has been assessed to be of least concern by the International Union for Conservation of Nature (IUCN), and by the Queensland Government under its Nature Conservation Act.

== Uses ==
The tree produces a useful hardwood with the trade name of 'canary beech'. It has a specific gravity of 0.62.

== Gallery ==
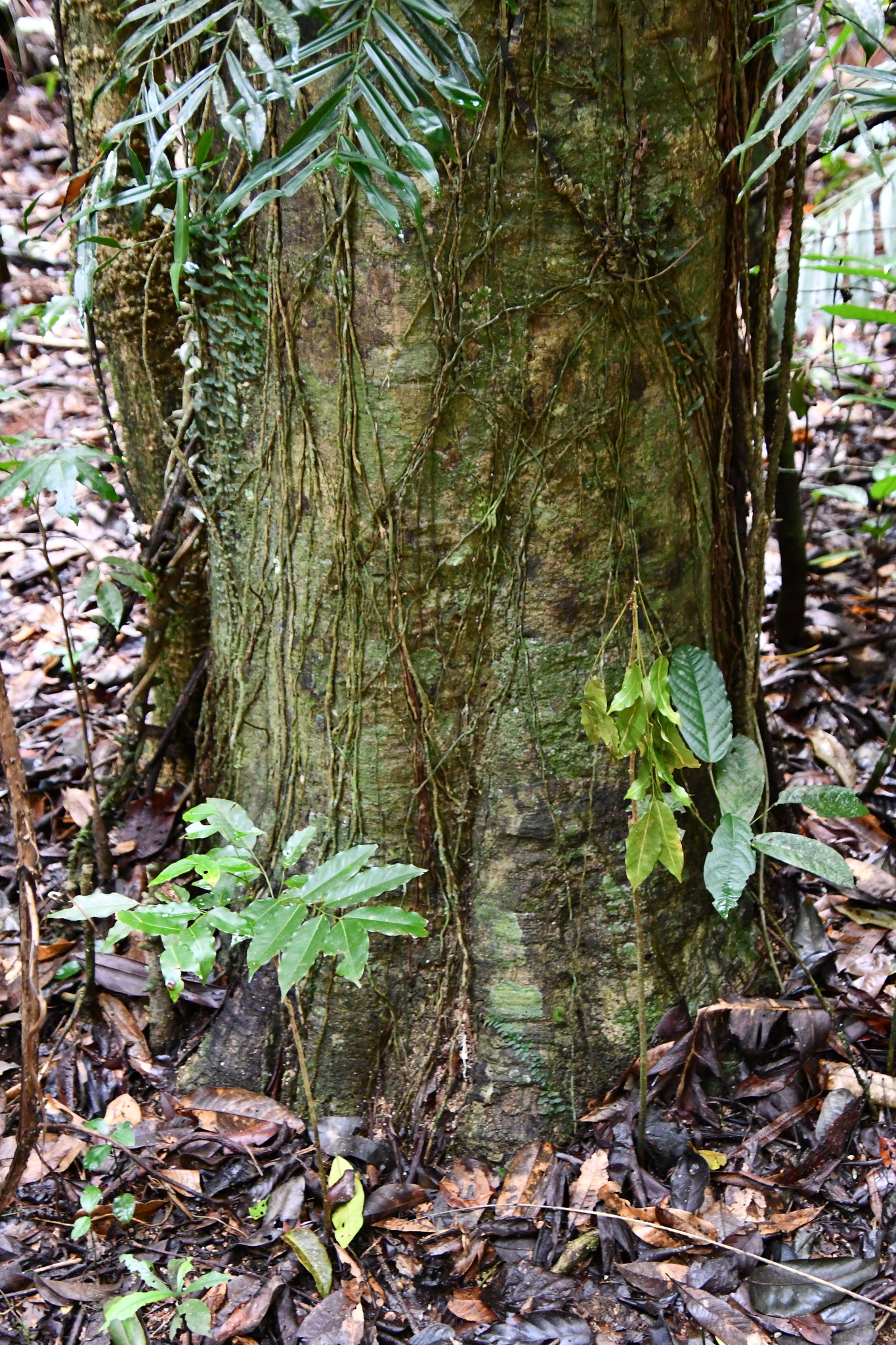
Trunk

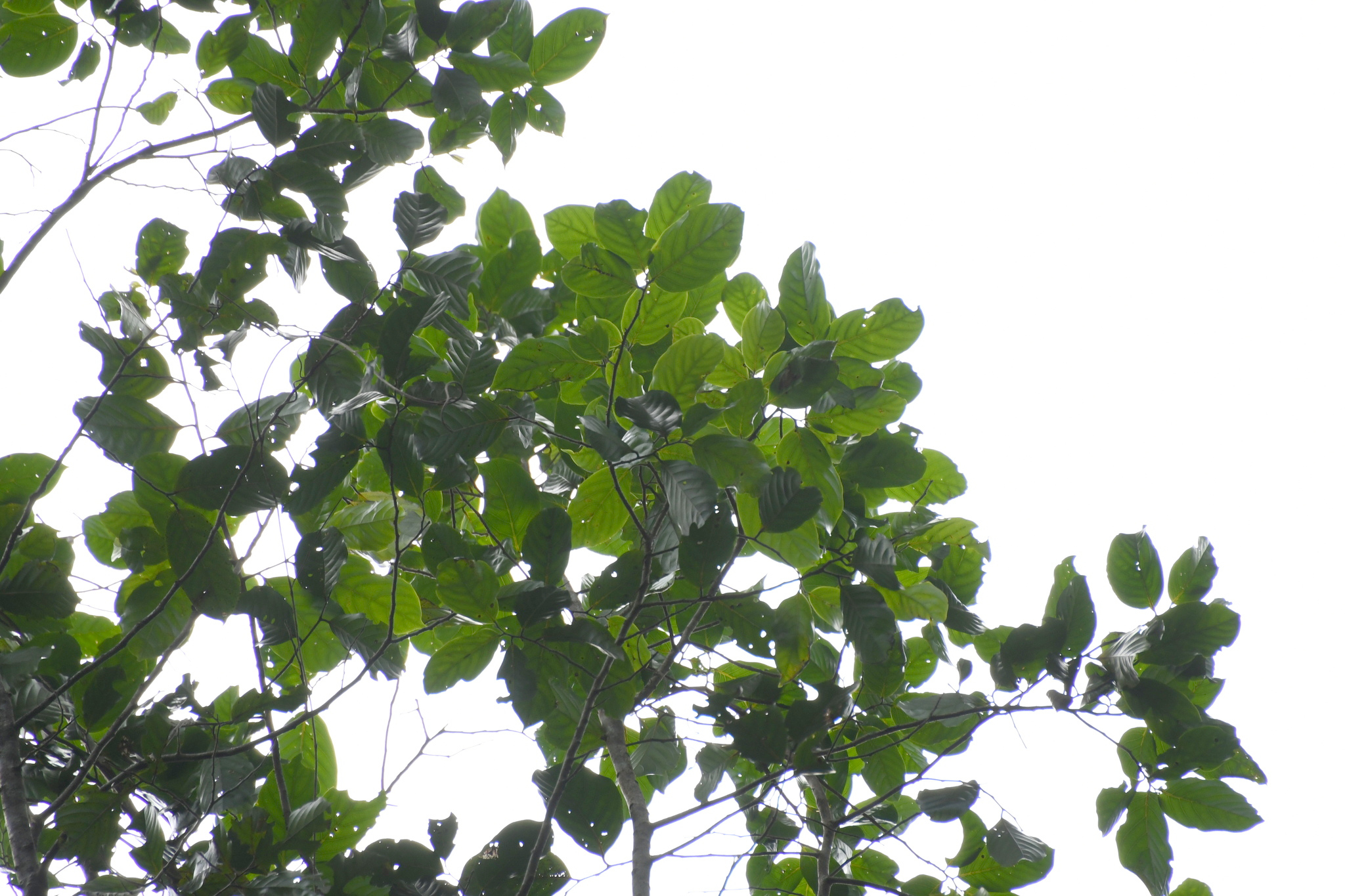
Foliage

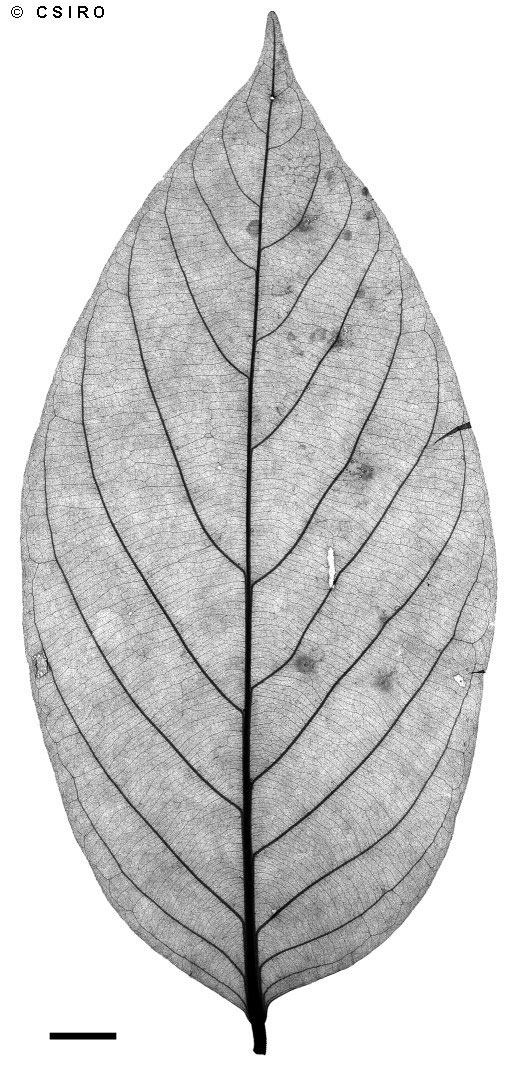
Leaf detail (x-ray)

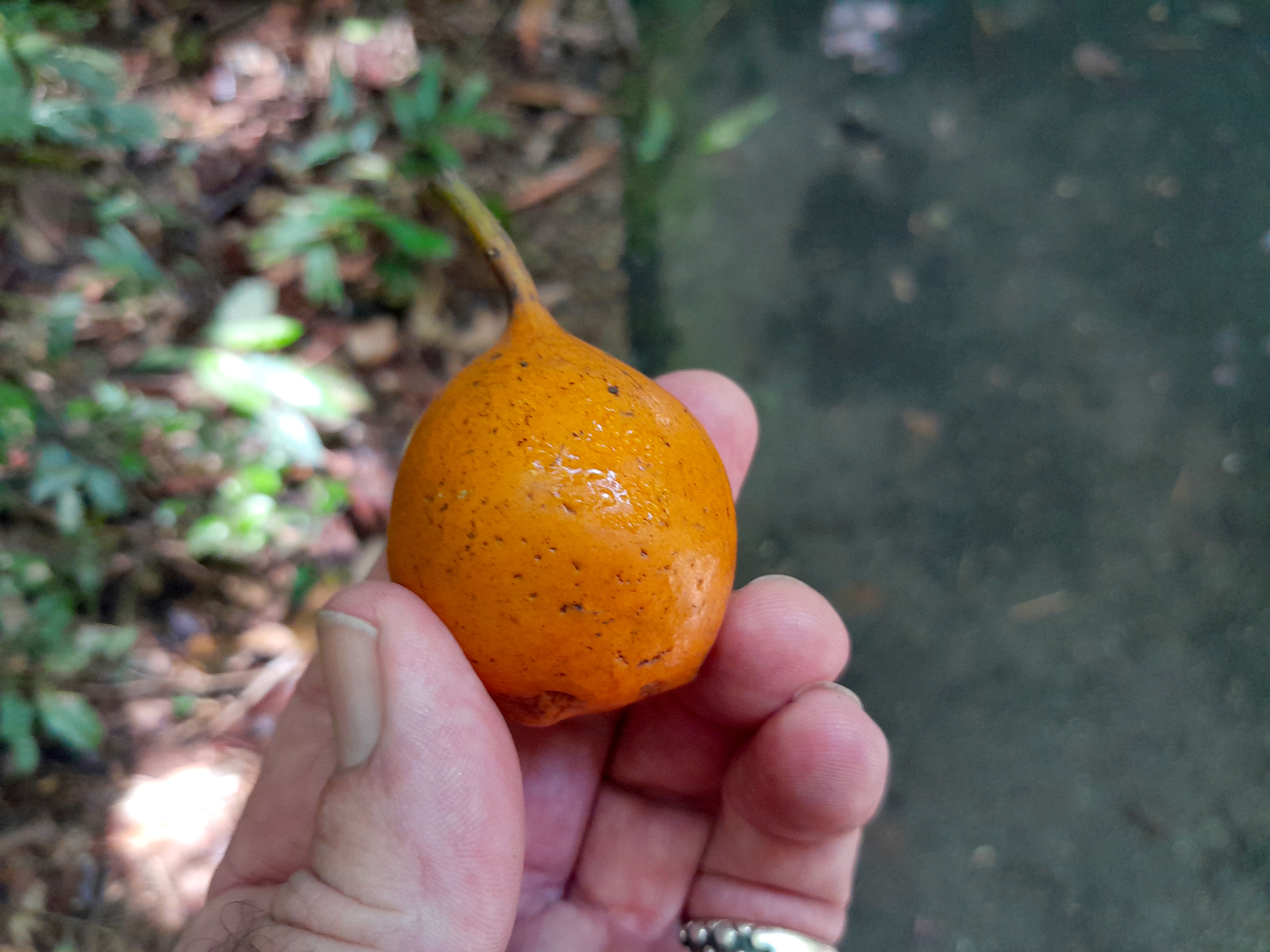
Fruit (fruitlet)
