= Polyalthia lateritia =

Conservation status
- Least Concern (IUCN 2.3)

Scientific classification
- Kingdom: Plantae
- Clade: Embryophytes
- Clade: Tracheophytes
- Clade: Spermatophytes
- Clade: Angiosperms
- Clade: Magnoliids
- Order: Magnoliales
- Family: Annonaceae
- Genus: Polyalthia
- Species: P. lateritia

Binomial name
- Polyalthia lateritia J.Sinclair

Species of tree

Polyalthia lateritia is a species of plant in the family Annonaceae. It is a tree found in Peninsular Malaysia and Thailand.
