= Disepalum plagioneurum =

Conservation status
- Least Concern (IUCN 3.1)

Scientific classification
- Kingdom: Plantae
- Clade: Embryophytes
- Clade: Tracheophytes
- Clade: Spermatophytes
- Clade: Angiosperms
- Clade: Magnoliids
- Order: Magnoliales
- Family: Annonaceae
- Genus: Disepalum
- Species: D. plagioneurum

Binomial name
- Disepalum plagioneurum (Diels) D.M.Johnson

Synonyms
- Enicosanthellum plagioneurum (Diels) Bân; Polyalthia pingpienensis P.T.Li; Polyalthia plagioneura Diels; Uvaria petelotii Exell

Species of flowering plant

Disepalum plagioneurum (synonym Polyalthia pingpienensis) is a species of flowering plant in the Annonaceae family. It is a tree native to southern China (southern Guizhou, Guangxi, Guangdong, and Hainan), Laos, and Vietnam.
