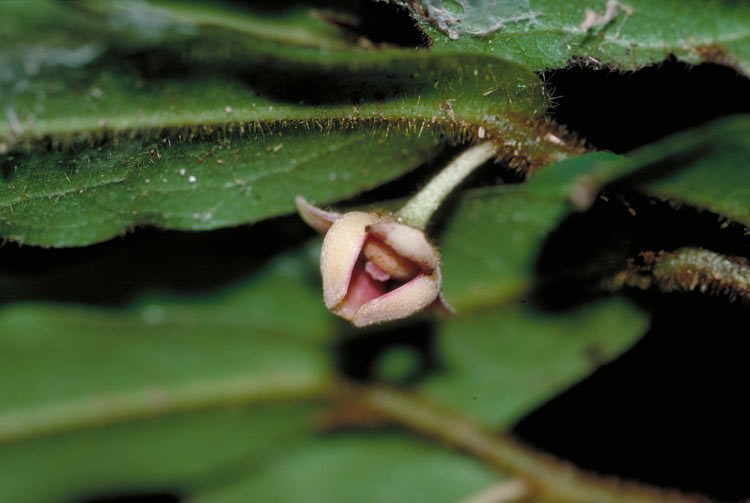
- Flower

Conservation status
- Least Concern (NCA)

Scientific classification
- Kingdom: Plantae
- Clade: Tracheophytes
- Clade: Angiosperms
- Clade: Magnoliids
- Order: Magnoliales
- Family: Annonaceae
- Genus: Polyalthia
- Species: P. hispida

Binomial name
- Polyalthia hispida B.Xue & R.M.K.Saunders

Synonyms
- Haplostichanthus rufescens Jessup

= Polyalthia hispida =

Species of flowering plant

Polyalthia hispida is a species of plants in the custard apple family Annonaceae. It is endemic to the foothills of Mount Bartle Frere, in the catchments of the north and south arms of the Johnstone River, Queensland, Australia. It is shrub or small tree which may flower once it has reached about 4 m (13 ft) in height. It was first described (as Haplostichanthus rufescens) in 2007 and transferred to its current name in 2012. It is listed as least concern under the Queensland Government's Nature Conservation Act.
