= Polyalthiopsis verrucipes =

Conservation status
- Critically Endangered (IUCN 3.1)

Scientific classification
- Kingdom: Plantae
- Clade: Tracheophytes
- Clade: Angiosperms
- Clade: Magnoliids
- Order: Magnoliales
- Family: Annonaceae
- Genus: Polyalthiopsis
- Species: P. verrucipes

Binomial name
- Polyalthiopsis verrucipes (C.Y.Wu ex P.T.Li) B.Xue & Y.H.Tan

Synonyms
- Polyalthia verrucipes C.Y.Wu ex P.T.Li

Species of flowering plant

Polyalthiopsis verrucipes is a species of flowering plant in the Annonaceae family. It is a tree endemic to southern Yunnan in south-central China.
