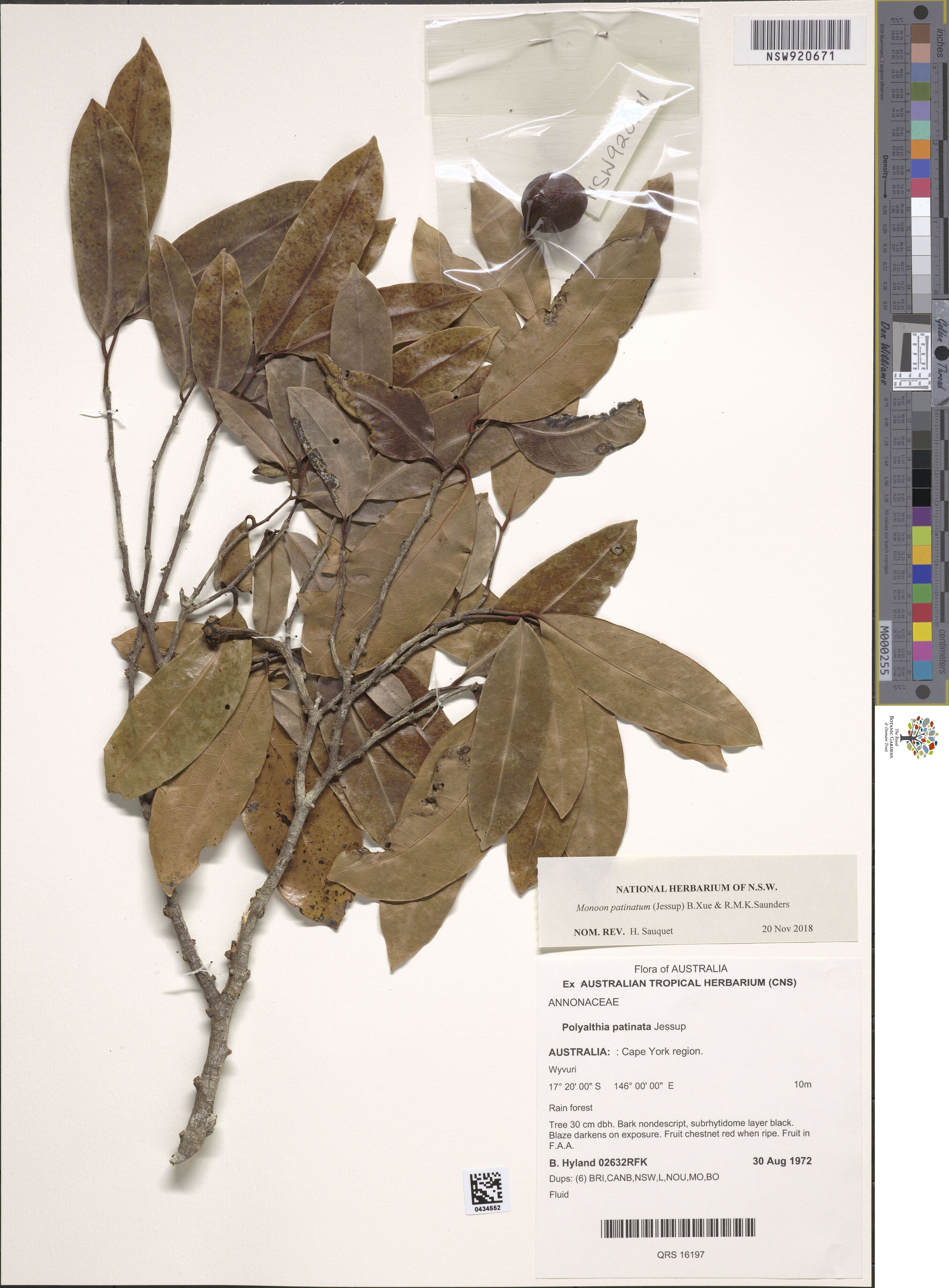
- Herbarium specimen

Conservation status
- Least Concern (NCA)

Scientific classification
- Kingdom: Plantae
- Clade: Tracheophytes
- Clade: Angiosperms
- Clade: Magnoliids
- Order: Magnoliales
- Family: Annonaceae
- Genus: Monoon
- Species: M. patinatum

Binomial name
- Monoon patinatum (Jessup) B.Xue & R.M.K.Saunders

Synonyms
- Polyalthia patinatum Jessup

= Monoon patinatum =

Species of flowering plant

Monoon patinatum is a species of plant in the custard apple family Annonaceae. It is native to a part of the Wet Tropics bioregion of Queensland, Australia, and has the conservation status of least concern. It was first described in 2007 as Polyalthia patinatum but soon afterwards it was transferred to the genus Monoon by Bine Xue and Richard M.K.Saunders in 2012.
