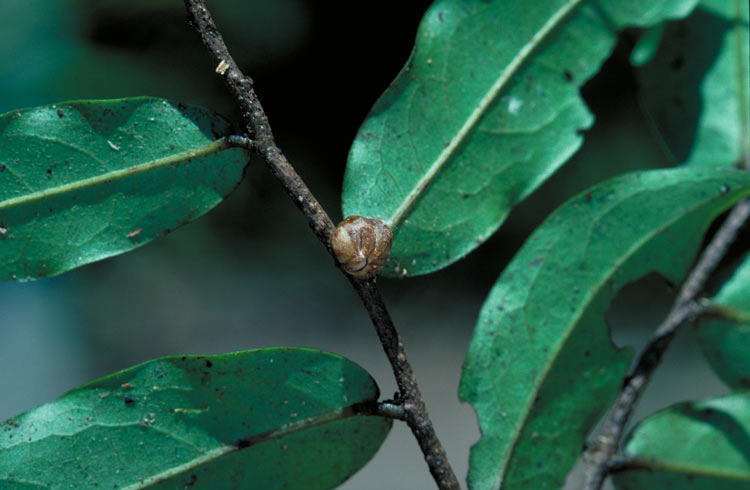
- Flower and foliage

Scientific classification
- Kingdom: Plantae
- Clade: Tracheophytes
- Clade: Angiosperms
- Clade: Magnoliids
- Order: Magnoliales
- Family: Annonaceae
- Genus: Polyalthia
- Species: P. submontana

Binomial name
- Polyalthia submontana (Jessup) B.Xue & R.M.K.Saunders

Synonyms
- Haplostichanthus submontanus Jessup

= Polyalthia submontana =

Species of flowering plant

Polyalthia submontana is a species of plants in the custard apple family Annonaceae. It is endemic to the rainforests of northeast Queensland, Australia. It is a shrub to about 4 m (13 ft) tall, first described (as Haplostichanthus submontanus) in 2007 and transferred to its current name in 2012. In 2017 botanist Laurence W. Jessup described the subspecies Polyalthia submontana subsp. sessiliflora.

== Infraspecies ==
Two subspecies are recognised:

Polyalthia submontana subsp. sessiliflora – Restricted to the Atherton Tableland. Conservation status is least concern.

Polyalthia submontana subsp. submontana – Scattered populations in the area around Rossville, and from Cape Tribulation to Mossman. Conservation status is near threatened.
