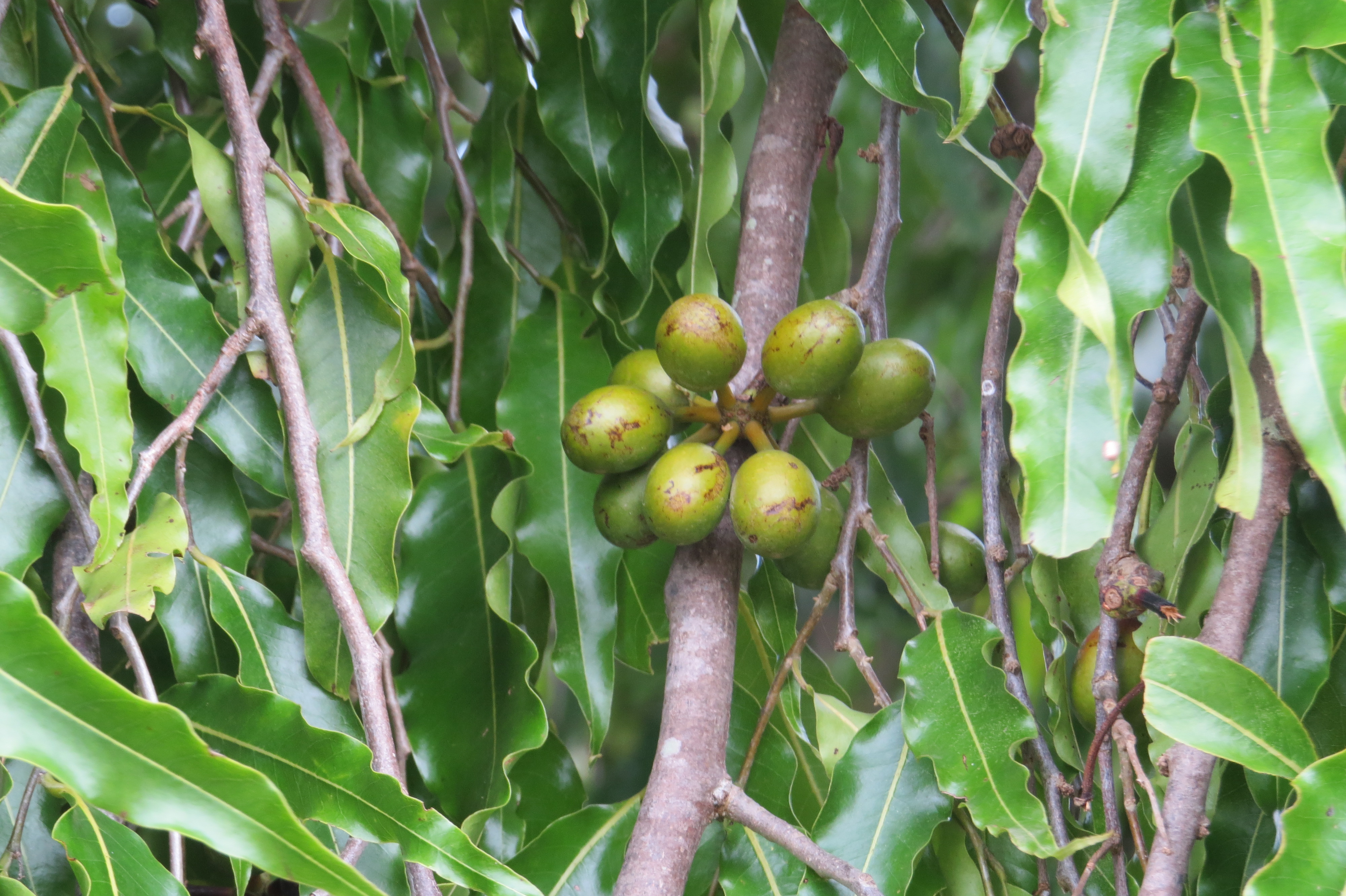
- Monoon longifolium fruits

Scientific classification
- Kingdom: Plantae
- Clade: Tracheophytes
- Clade: Angiosperms
- Clade: Magnoliids
- Order: Magnoliales
- Family: Annonaceae
- Tribe: Miliuseae
- Genus: Monoon; Miq.

Synonyms
- Cleistopetalum H.Okada; Enicosanthum Becc.; Griffithia Maingay ex King; Griffithianthus Merr.; Marcuccia Becc.; Woodiella Merr.; Woodiellantha Rauschert

= Monoon =

Genus of flowering plants

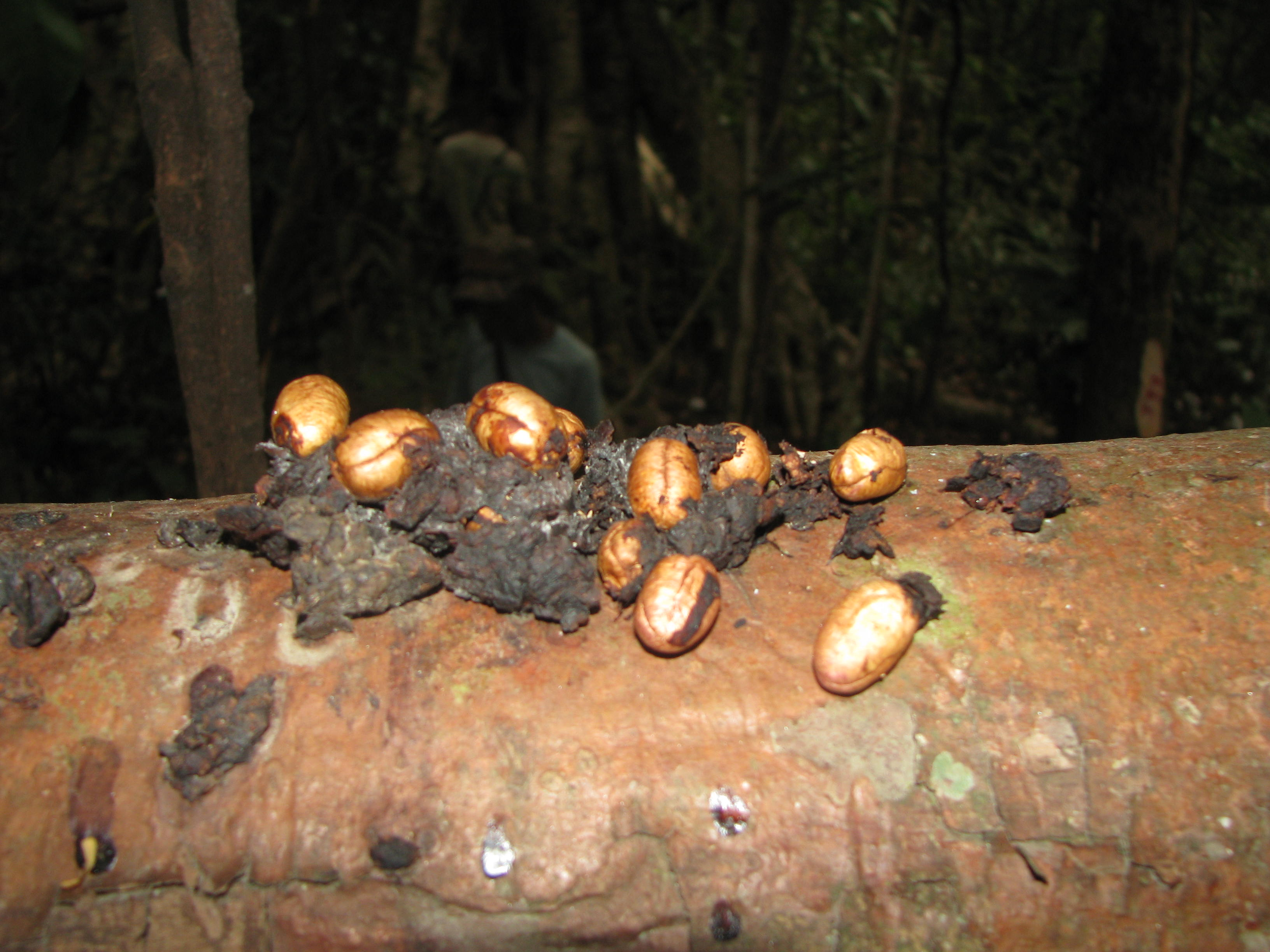
Monoon simiarum seeds dispersed by civets in Pakke Tiger Reserve, India

Monoon is a genus of about 80 species of lowland tropical trees in the family Annonaceae, within the tribe Miliuseae. Species have been recorded from the Indian subcontinent, Indochina, Malesia through New Guinea, the Solomon Islands, and northern Australia. The genus was resurrected out from Polyalthia following a molecular study showing the two genera as not immediately related.

== Species ==
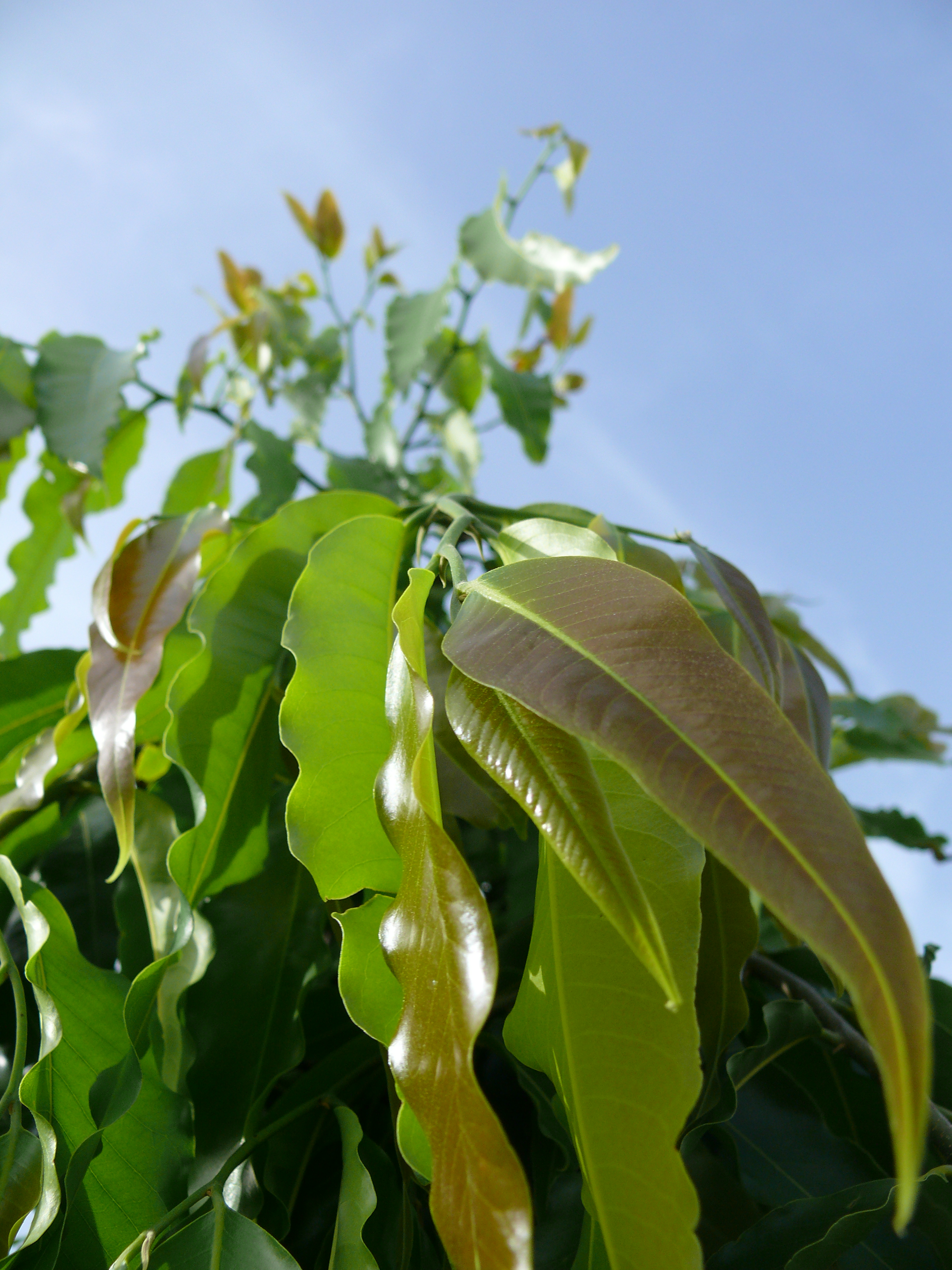
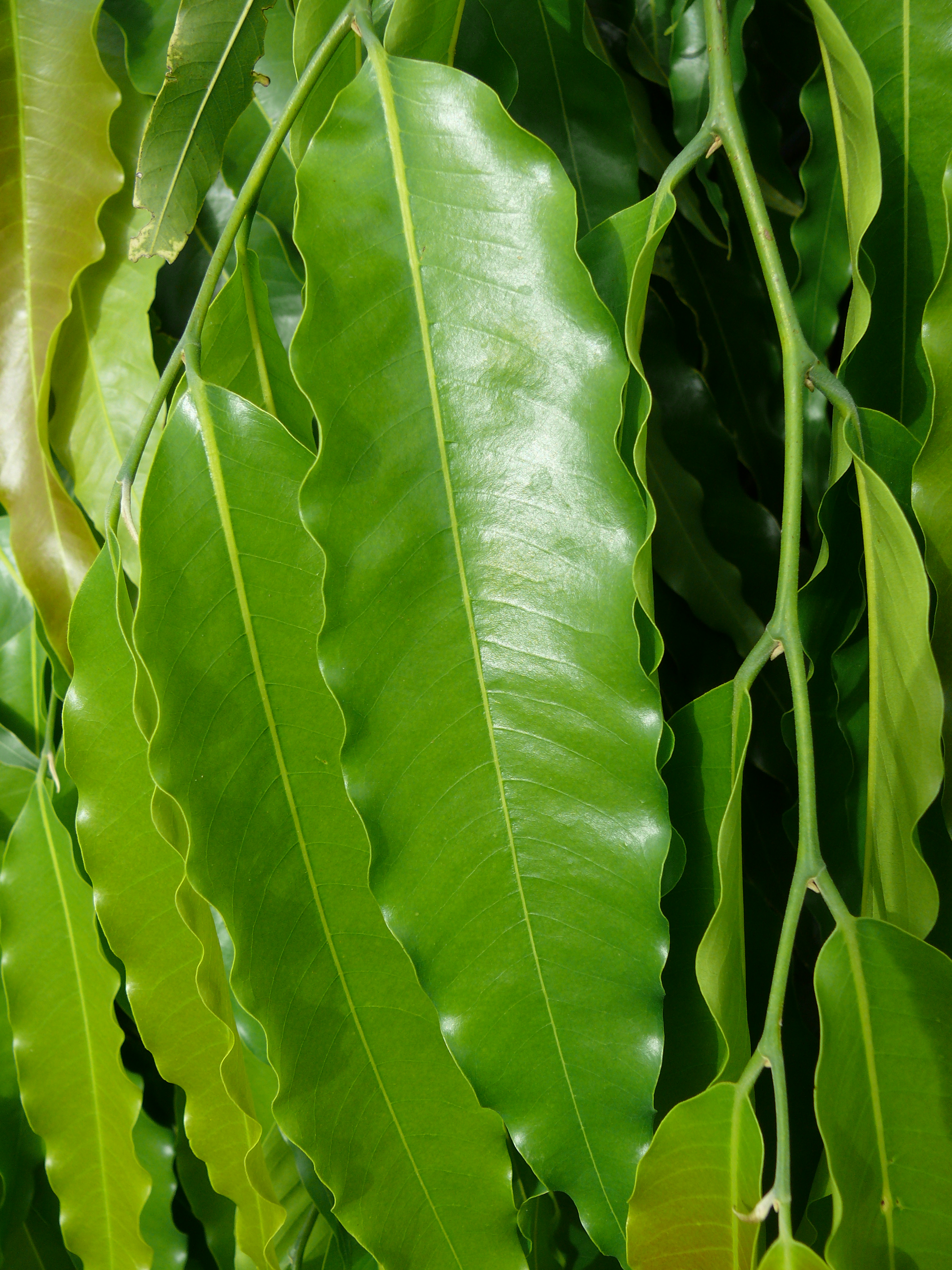
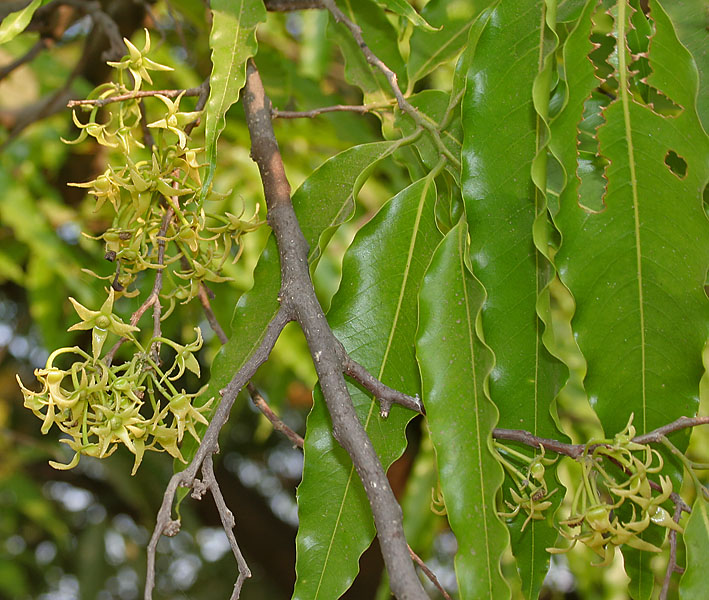
Monoon longifolium var pendula - leaves and flowers

As of March 2026, Plants of the World Online accepts the following 75 species:

- Monoon acuminatum (Thwaites) B.Xue & R.M.K.Saunders
- Monoon amischocarpum (I.M.Turner) B.Xue & R.M.K.Saunders
- Monoon anomalum (Becc.) B.Xue & R.M.K.Saunders
- Monoon asteriellum (Ridl.) B.Xue & R.M.K.Saunders
- Monoon australe (Benth.) B.Xue & R.M.K.Saunders
- Monoon barnesii (Merr.) B.Xue & R.M.K.Saunders
- Monoon bathrantherum I.M.Turner
- Monoon bemban Miq.
- Monoon borneense (H.Okada) B.Xue & R.M.K.Saunders
- Monoon brevipedunculatum (Boerl.) B.Xue & R.M.K.Saunders
- Monoon chloroxanthum Miq.
- Monoon clavigerum (King) Bunchalee
- Monoon coffeoides (Thwaites ex Hook.f. & Thomson) B.Xue & R.M.K.Saunders
- Monoon congestum (Ridl.) B.Xue & R.M.K.Saunders
- Monoon congregatum (King) B.Xue & R.M.K.Saunders
- Monoon coriaceum (Ridl.) B.Xue & R.M.K.Saunders
- Monoon costigerum Miq.
- Monoon cupulare (King) B.Xue & R.M.K.Saunders
- Monoon daclacense (Bân) B.Xue & R.M.K.Saunders
- Monoon elongatum (Merr.) B.Xue & R.M.K.Saunders
- Monoon erianthoides (Airy Shaw) B.Xue & R.M.K.Saunders
- Monoon fragrans (Dalzell) B.Xue & R.M.K.Saunders
- Monoon fuscum (King) B.Xue & R.M.K.Saunders
- Monoon gigantifolium (Merr.) B.Xue & R.M.K.Saunders
- Monoon glabrum (Hook.f. & Thomson) B.Xue & R.M.K.Saunders
- Monoon grandiflorum (Becc.) B.Xue & R.M.K.Saunders
- Monoon grandifolium (Elmer) B.Xue & R.M.K.Saunders
- Monoon harmandii (Pierre) B.Xue & R.M.K.Saunders
- Monoon hookerianum (King) B.Xue & R.M.K.Saunders
- Monoon hypogaeum (King) B.Xue & R.M.K.Saunders
- Monoon jucundum (Pierre) B.Xue & R.M.K.Saunders
- Monoon kalimantanense Nurmawati
- Monoon kingii (Baker f.) B.Xue & R.M.K.Saunders
- Monoon klemmei (Elmer) B.Xue & R.M.K.Saunders
- Monoon lateriflorum (Blume) Miq.
- Monoon laui (Merr.) B.Xue & R.M.K.Saunders
- Monoon liukiuense (Hatus.) B.Xue & R.M.K.Saunders
- Monoon longifolium (Sonn.) B.Xue & R.M.K.Saunders
- Monoon longipetalum Nurmawati
- Monoon macranthum (King) B.Xue & R.M.K.Saunders
- Monoon magnoliiflorum (Maingay ex Hook.f. & Thomson) B.Xue & R.M.K.Saunders
- Monoon malayanum I.M.Turner & Utteridge
- Monoon membranifolium (J.Sinclair) B.Xue & R.M.K.Saunders
- Monoon merguiense (Chatterjee) B.Xue & R.M.K.Saunders
- Monoon merrillii (Kaneh.) I.M.Turner & Utteridge
- Monoon michaelii (C.T.White) B.Xue & R.M.K.Saunders
- Monoon mindanaense (Elmer) B.Xue & R.M.K.Saunders
- Monoon namkadingense Soulad. & Tagane
- Monoon nitidum (A.DC.) I.M.Turner
- Monoon oblongifolium (C.B.Rob.) B.Xue & R.M.K.Saunders
- Monoon obtusum (Craib) B.Xue & R.M.K.Saunders
- Monoon oligocarpum Miq.
- Monoon ornithocephalum Bunchalee
- Monoon pachypetalum I.M.Turner & Utteridge
- Monoon pachyphyllum (King) B.Xue & R.M.K.Saunders
- Monoon paradoxum (Becc.) B.Xue & R.M.K.Saunders
- Monoon patinatum (Jessup) B.Xue & R.M.K.Saunders
- Monoon phukraduengense Bunchalee
- Monoon phuluangense Bunchalee
- Monoon praestigiosum (J.Sinclair) B.Xue & R.M.K.Saunders
- Monoon ramiflorum (Merr.) B.Xue & R.M.K.Saunders
- Monoon roseum Bunchalee
- Monoon salomonicum I.M.Turner & Utteridge
- Monoon sclerophyllum (Hook.f. & Thomson) B.Xue & R.M.K.Saunders
- Monoon shendurunii (Basha & Sasidh.) B.Xue & R.M.K.Saunders
- Monoon simiarum (Buch.-Ham. ex Hook.f. & Thomson) B.Xue & R.M.K.Saunders
- Monoon sublanceolatum Miq.
- Monoon sympetalum (Merr.) B.Xue & R.M.K.Saunders
- Monoon thorelii (Pierre) B.Xue & R.M.K.Saunders
- Monoon tirunelveliense (M.B.Viswan. & Manik.) B.Xue & R.M.K.Saunders
- Monoon tsukayae (H.Okada) Saengpho & Chaowasku
- Monoon vietnamensis N.S.Lý
- Monoon viride (Craib) B.Xue & R.M.K.Saunders
- Monoon xanthopetalum (Merr.) B.Xue & R.M.K.Saunders
- Monoon zamboangaense (Merr.) B.Xue & R.M.K.Saunders
