= Polyalthia chrysotricha =

Conservation status
- Least Concern (IUCN 3.1)

Scientific classification
- Kingdom: Plantae
- Clade: Embryophytes
- Clade: Tracheophytes
- Clade: Spermatophytes
- Clade: Angiosperms
- Clade: Magnoliids
- Order: Magnoliales
- Family: Annonaceae
- Genus: Polyalthia
- Species: P. chrysotricha

Binomial name
- Polyalthia chrysotricha Ridl.

Species of tree

Polyalthia chrysotricha is a species of flowering plant in the family Annonaceae. It is a tree native to Borneo and Peninsular Malaysia.
