= Polyalthia lancilimba =

Conservation status
- Critically Endangered (IUCN 3.1)

Scientific classification
- Kingdom: Plantae
- Clade: Tracheophytes
- Clade: Angiosperms
- Clade: Magnoliids
- Order: Magnoliales
- Family: Annonaceae
- Genus: Polyalthia
- Species: P. lancilimba

Binomial name
- Polyalthia lancilimba C.Y.Wu ex P.T.Li

Species of flowering plant

Polyalthia lancilimba is a species of plant in the Annonaceae family. It is a tree endemic to southeastern Yunnan province of south-central China.
