= Polyalthiopsis =

Scientific classification
- Kingdom: Plantae
- Clade: Tracheophytes
- Clade: Angiosperms
- Clade: Magnoliids
- Order: Magnoliales
- Family: Annonaceae
- Subfamily: Malmeoideae
- Tribe: Miliuseae
- Genus: Polyalthiopsis; Chaowasku

Genus of flowering plants

Polyalthiopsis is a genus of plants in the family Annonaceae and tribe Miliuseae. Its native range is Tibet, China and Vietnam.

== Species ==
As of January 2025, Plants of the World Online includes the following species:

1. Polyalthiopsis chinensis (S.K.Wu & P.T.Li) B.Xue & Y.H.Tan
2. Polyalthiopsis floribunda (Jovet-Ast) Chaowasku - type species
3. Polyalthiopsis nigra Y.H.Tan & B.Yang bis
4. Polyalthiopsis verrucipes (C.Y.Wu ex P.T.Li) B.Xue & Y.H.Tan
5. Polyalthiopsis xui Y.H.Tan & B.Yang bis
