= Monoon glabrum =

Conservation status
- Critically Endangered (IUCN 3.1)

Scientific classification
- Kingdom: Plantae
- Clade: Tracheophytes
- Clade: Angiosperms
- Clade: Magnoliids
- Order: Magnoliales
- Family: Annonaceae
- Genus: Monoon
- Species: M. glabrum

Binomial name
- Monoon glabrum (Hook.f. & Thomson) B.Xue & R.M.K.Saunders

Synonyms
- Ellipeia glabra Hook.f. & Thomson; Polyalthia glabra (Hook.f. & Thomson) J.Sinclair; Polyalthia curtisii Ridl.

Species of flowering plant

Monoon glabrum is a species of plants in the custard apple family Annonaceae. It is a tree endemic to Peninsular Malaysia and is threatened by habitat loss.
