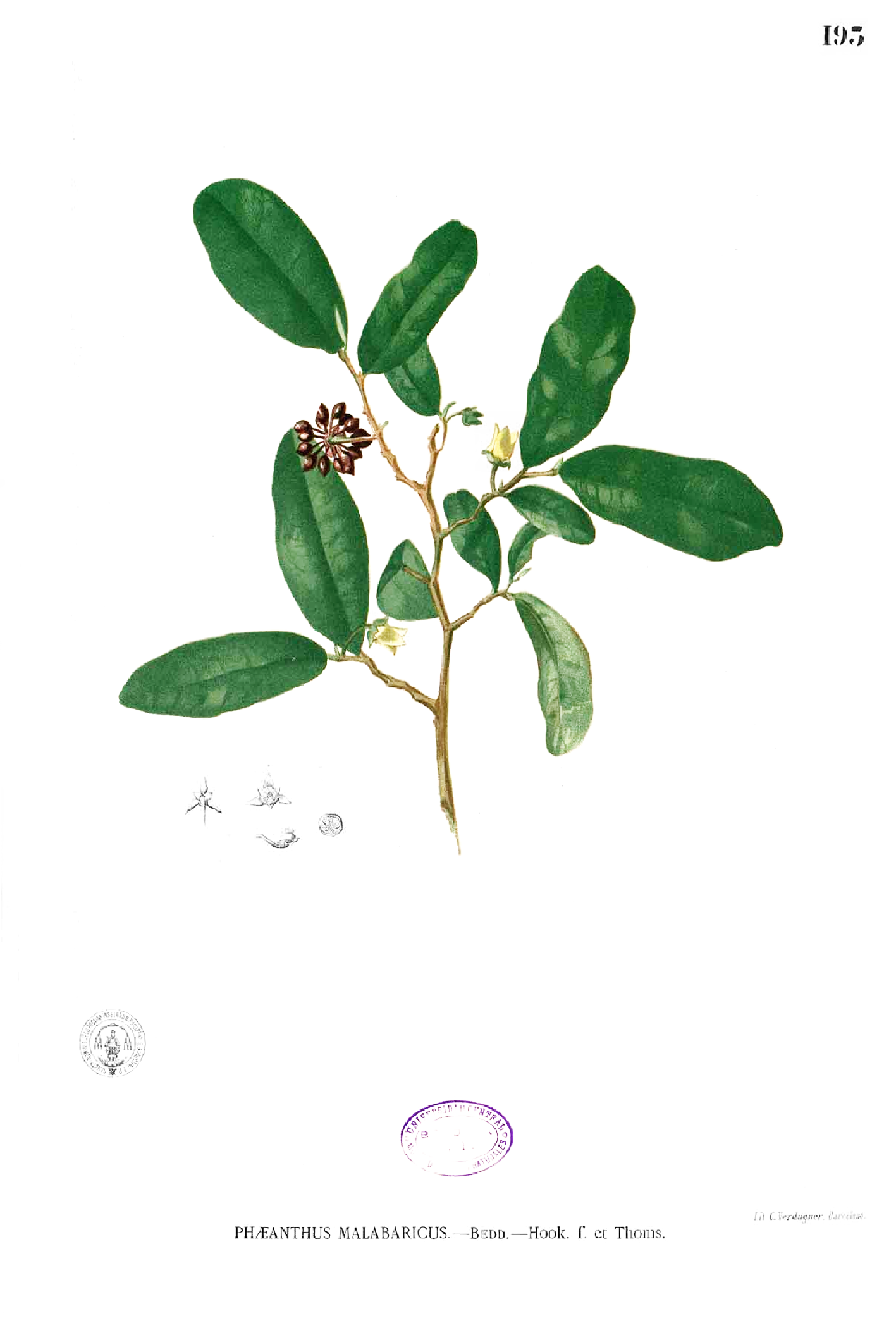

Conservation status
- Near Threatened (IUCN 2.3)

Scientific classification
- Kingdom: Plantae
- Clade: Tracheophytes
- Clade: Angiosperms
- Clade: Magnoliids
- Order: Magnoliales
- Family: Annonaceae
- Subfamily: Malmeoideae
- Tribe: Miliuseae
- Genus: Polyalthia
- Species: P. malabarica

Binomial name
- Polyalthia malabarica (Bedd.) I.M.Turner

Synonyms
- Phaeanthus malabaricus Bedd.

= Polyalthia malabarica =

Species of flowering plant

Polyalthia malabarica (formerly placed in the genus Phaeanthus as Phaeanthus malabaricus) is a species of plant in the family Annonaceae and tribe Miliuseae. It is endemic to south-west India. It is threatened by habitat loss.
