= Monoon pachyphyllum =

Conservation status
- Data Deficient (IUCN 3.1)

Scientific classification
- Kingdom: Plantae
- Clade: Embryophytes
- Clade: Tracheophytes
- Clade: Spermatophytes
- Clade: Angiosperms
- Clade: Magnoliids
- Order: Magnoliales
- Family: Annonaceae
- Genus: Monoon
- Species: M. pachyphyllum

Binomial name
- Monoon pachyphyllum King B.Xue & R.M.K.Saunders

Synonyms
- Polyalthia pachyphylla King

Species of flowering plant

Monoon pachyphyllum is a species of plant in the family Annonaceae. It is a tree endemic to Peninsular Malaysia.
