= Monoon hypogaeum =

Conservation status
- Least Concern (IUCN 3.1)

Scientific classification
- Kingdom: Plantae
- Clade: Embryophytes
- Clade: Tracheophytes
- Clade: Spermatophytes
- Clade: Angiosperms
- Clade: Magnoliids
- Order: Magnoliales
- Family: Annonaceae
- Genus: Monoon
- Species: M. hypogaeum

Binomial name
- Monoon hypogaeum (King) B.Xue & R.M.K.Saunders

Synonyms
- Polyalthia hypogaea King

Species of tree

Monoon hypogaeum is a species of plants in the tribe Miliuseae of the custard apple family Annonaceae. It is a tree endemic to Peninsular Malaysia. The flowers are cauliflorous, produced at the base of the trunk, as in the related Monoon bathrantherum, but differing from that in the flowers being in inflorescences with long, flexible stems, rather than stout and stiff as in M. bathrantherum.
