= Monoon hookerianum =

Conservation status
- Least Concern (IUCN 3.1)

Scientific classification
- Kingdom: Plantae
- Clade: Embryophytes
- Clade: Tracheophytes
- Clade: Spermatophytes
- Clade: Angiosperms
- Clade: Magnoliids
- Order: Magnoliales
- Family: Annonaceae
- Genus: Monoon
- Species: M. hookerianum

Binomial name
- Monoon hookerianum (King) B.Xue & R.M.K.Saunders

Synonyms
- Polyalthia hookeriana King

Species of flowering plant

Monoon hookerianum is a species of plants in the custard apple family Annonaceae. It is a tree found in Malaysia and Singapore.
