= Polyalthiopsis floribunda =

Conservation status
- Critically Endangered (IUCN 3.1)

Scientific classification
- Kingdom: Plantae
- Clade: Embryophytes
- Clade: Tracheophytes
- Clade: Spermatophytes
- Clade: Angiosperms
- Clade: Magnoliids
- Order: Magnoliales
- Family: Annonaceae
- Genus: Polyalthiopsis
- Species: P. floribunda

Binomial name
- Polyalthiopsis floribunda (Jovet-Ast) Chaowasku

Synonyms
- Huberantha floribunda (Jovet-Ast) I.M.Turner; Polyalthia floribunda Jovet-Ast

Species of flowering plant

Polyalthiopsis floribunda is a species of plants in the custard apple family Annonaceae endemic to Vietnam.
