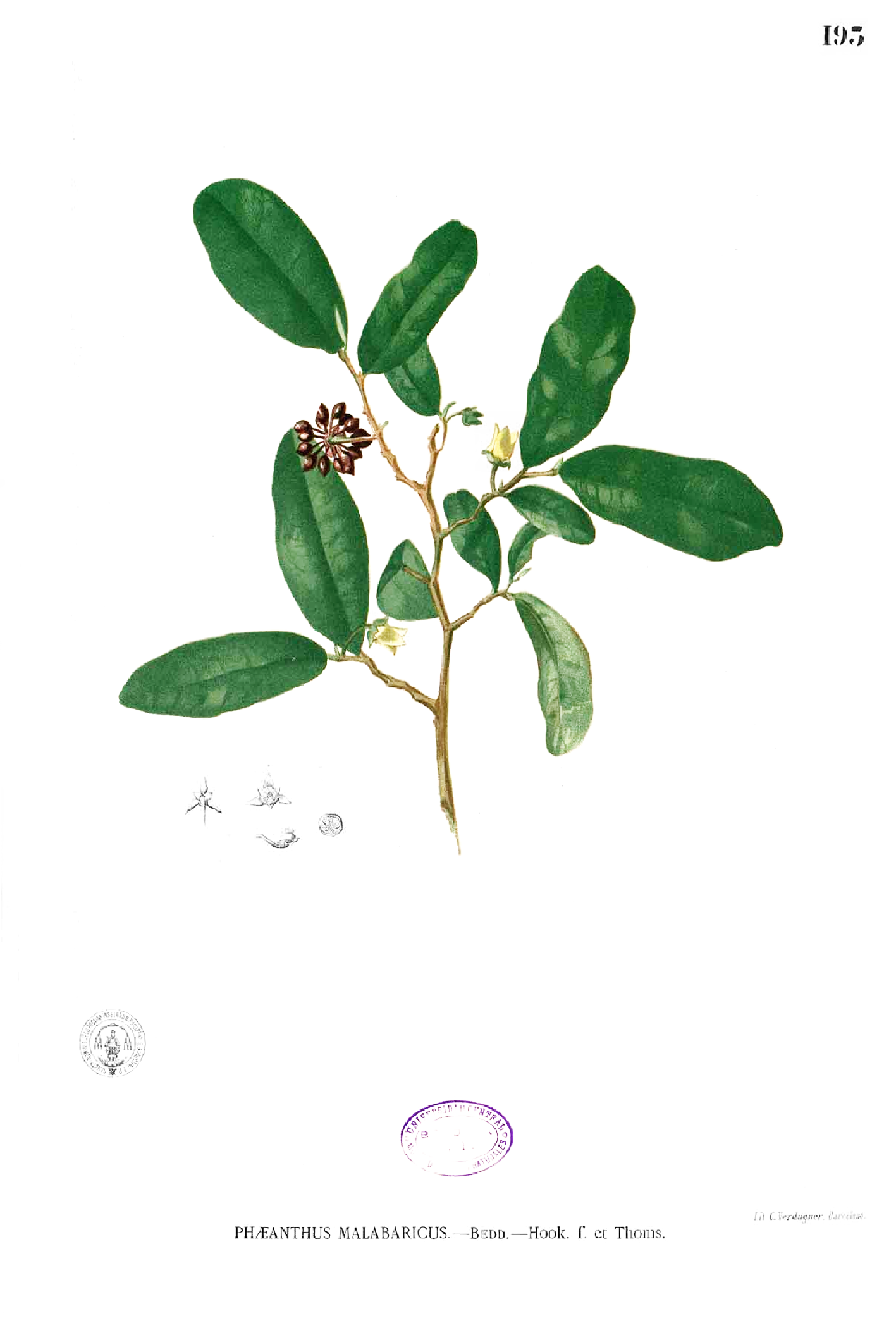
- Phaeanthus malabaricus

Scientific classification
- Kingdom: Plantae
- Clade: Tracheophytes
- Clade: Angiosperms
- Clade: Magnoliids
- Order: Magnoliales
- Family: Annonaceae
- Tribe: Miliuseae
- Genus: Phaeanthus; Hook.f. & Thomson

= Phaeanthus =

Genus of flowering plants

Phaeanthus is a genus of plants in family Annonaceae native to Indo-China, Malesia and the island of New Guinea.

== Species ==
As of January 2025, Plants of the World Online accepts the following 9 species:

- Phaeanthus impressinervius Merr.
- Phaeanthus intermedius (P.Parm.) I.M.Turner & Veldkamp
- Phaeanthus ophthalmicus (Roxb. ex G.Don) J.Sinclair
- Phaeanthus piyae Wiya, Aongyong & Chaowasku
- Phaeanthus splendens Miq.
- Phaeanthus sumatrana Miq.
- Phaeanthus tephrocarpus Merr.
- Phaeanthus vietnamensis Bân
- Phaeanthus villosus Merr.

=== Species now placed in other genera ===
- Phaeanthus acuminatus Merr. – synonym of Polyalthia mindorensis Merr.
- Phaeanthus malabaricus Bedd. – synonym of Polyalthia malabarica (Bedd.) I.M.Turner
- Phaeanthus saccopetaloides W.T.Wang – synonym of Wangia saccopetaloides (W.T.Wang) X.Guo & R.M.K.Saunders
