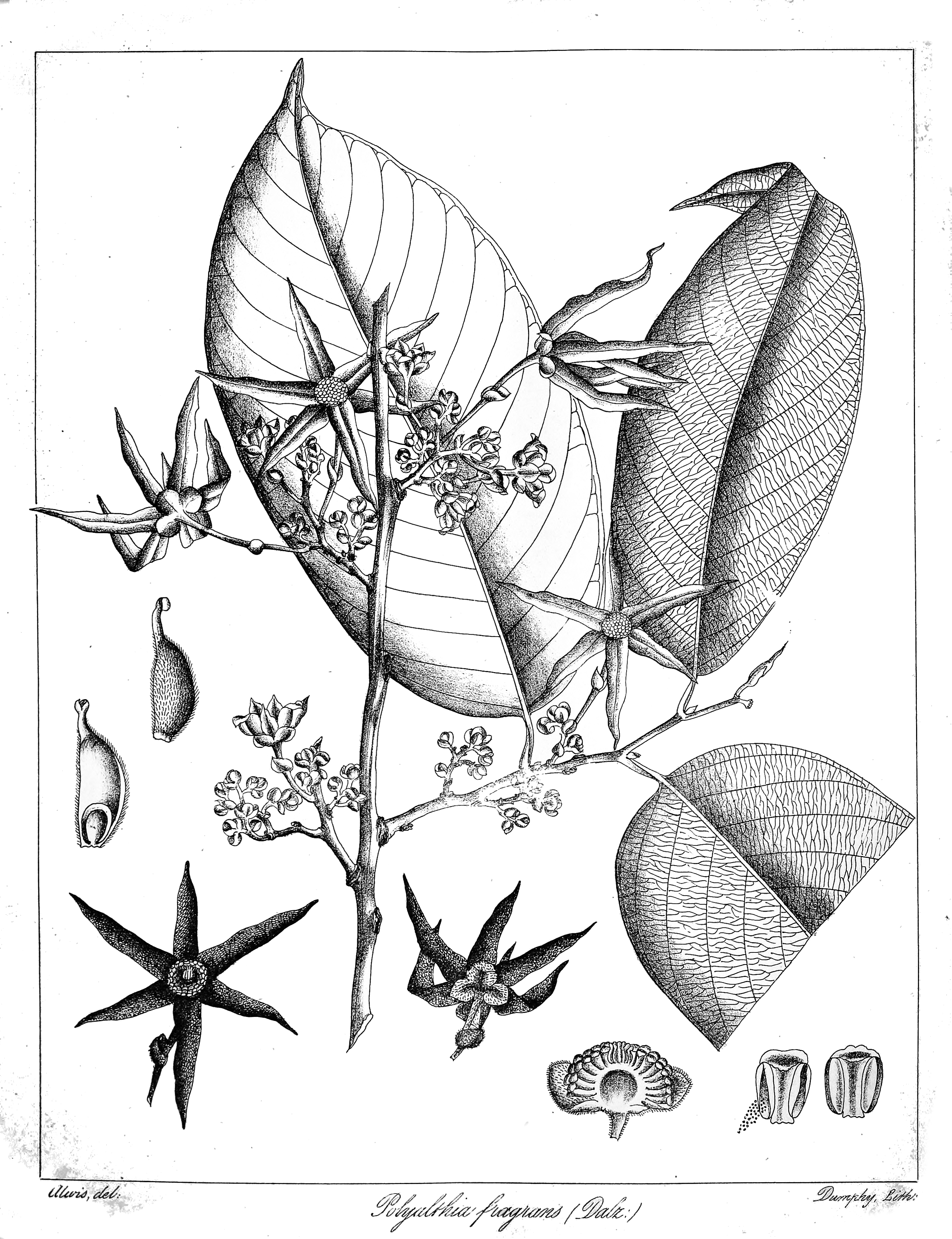

Scientific classification
- Kingdom: Plantae
- Clade: Tracheophytes
- Clade: Angiosperms
- Clade: Magnoliids
- Order: Magnoliales
- Family: Annonaceae
- Genus: Monoon
- Species: M. fragrans

Binomial name
- Monoon fragrans (Dalzell) B.Xue & R.M.K.Saunders

Synonyms
- Guatteria fragrans Dalzell; Polyalthia fragrans (Dalzell) Bedd.

= Monoon fragrans =

Species of flowering plant

Monoon fragrans is a plant in the Annonaceae family. Its leaves have a fragrant smell. It is called Gowrimara in Kannada. It is found in forests of the Western Ghats of India.
