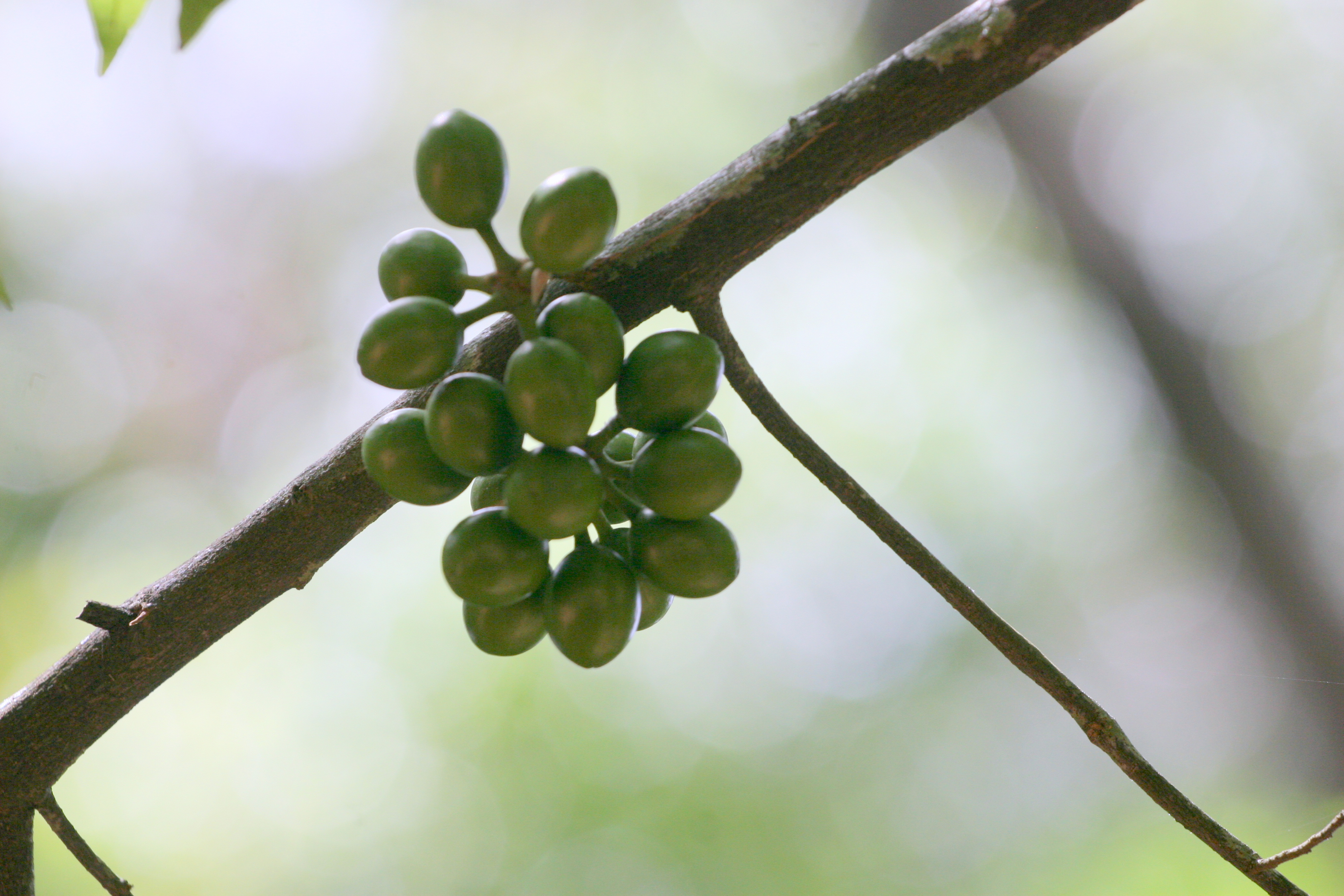
- Monoon coffeoides fruits

Conservation status
- Least Concern (IUCN 3.1)

Scientific classification
- Kingdom: Plantae
- Clade: Embryophytes
- Clade: Tracheophytes
- Clade: Spermatophytes
- Clade: Angiosperms
- Clade: Magnoliids
- Order: Magnoliales
- Family: Annonaceae
- Genus: Monoon
- Species: M. coffeoides

Binomial name
- Monoon coffeoides (Thwaites ex Hook.f. & Thomson) B.Xue & R.M.K.Saunders

Synonyms
- Guatteria coffeoides Thwaites ex Hook.f. & Thomson; Polyalthia coffeoides (Thwaites ex Hook.f. & Thomson) Bedd.

= Monoon coffeoides =

Species of flowering plant

Monoon coffeoides is a species of flowering plant in the Annonaceae family. It is a tree native to southwestern India and Sri Lanka.

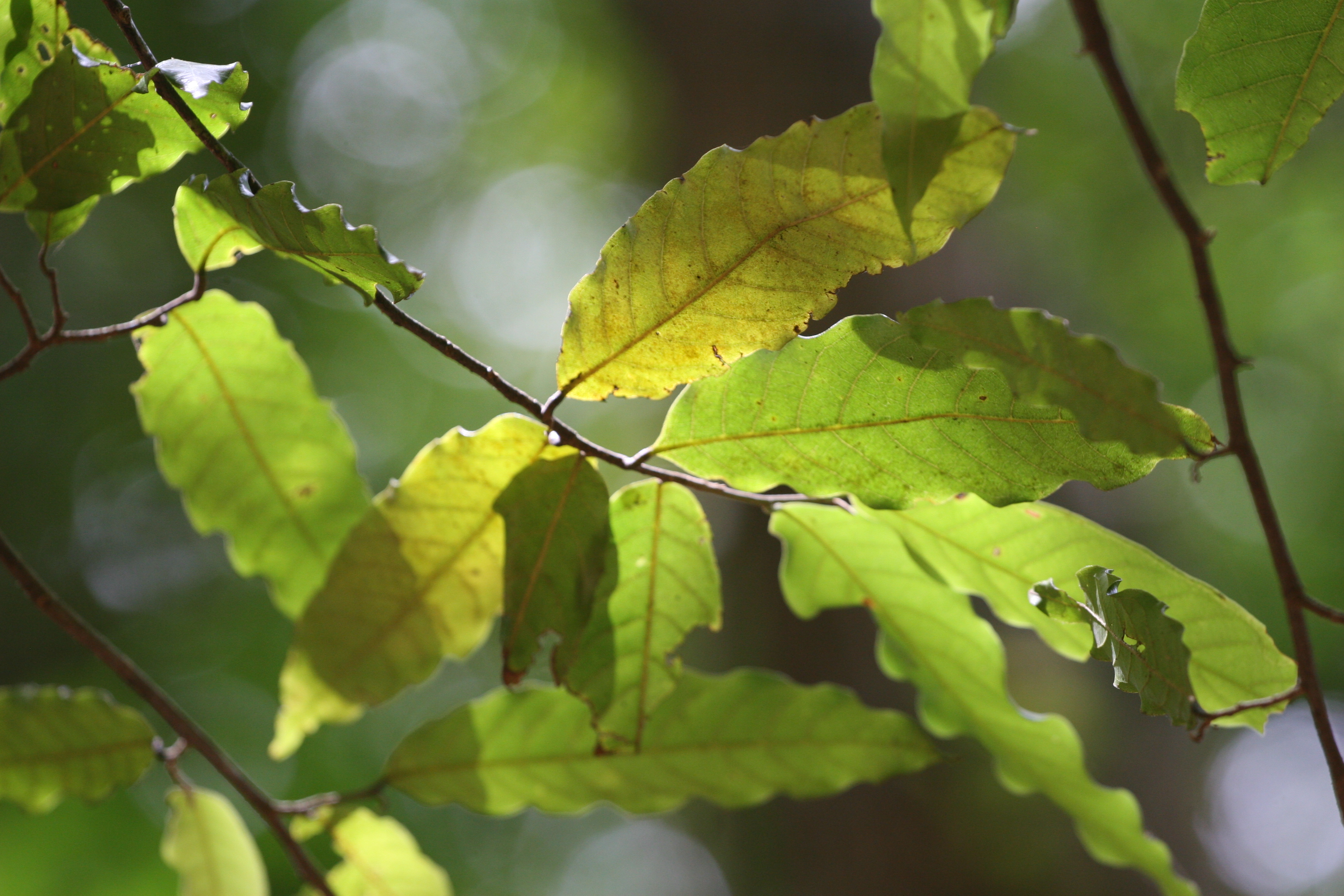
Monoon coffeoides, Sri Lanka

== Uses ==
Fruit - edible for langurs and other fruit bats.

== Culture ==
Known as "ඕමාර - omara" in Sinhala Language.
