= Disepalum =

Scientific classification
- Kingdom: Plantae
- Clade: Tracheophytes
- Clade: Angiosperms
- Clade: Magnoliids
- Order: Magnoliales
- Family: Annonaceae
- Subfamily: Annonoideae
- Genus: Disepalum; Hook.f.

Type species
- Disepalum anomalum Hook.f.

Synonyms
- Enicosanthellum Bân

Genus of flowering plants

Disepalum is a genus of plants in the family Annonaceae and tribe Annoneae, native to southern China and Hainan; Laos, Thailand and Vietnam in mainland Southeast Asia; and Borneo, Malaya and Sumatera in Malesia.

== Species ==
As of January 2025, Plants of the World Online accepts the following 10 species:

- Disepalum aciculare D.M.Johnson
- Disepalum acuminatissimum Boerl. & Koord.-Schum.
- Disepalum anomalum Hook.f.
- Disepalum coronatum Becc.
- Disepalum longipes King
- Disepalum petelotii (Merr.) D.M.Johnson
- Disepalum plagioneurum (Diels) D.M.Johnson
- Disepalum platypetalum Merr.
- Disepalum pulchrum (King) J.Sinclair
- Disepalum rawagambut Randi, D.C.Thomas & Wijedasa
