= Phaeanthus ophthalmicus =

Conservation status
- Least Concern (IUCN 3.1)

Scientific classification
- Kingdom: Plantae
- Clade: Embryophytes
- Clade: Tracheophytes
- Clade: Spermatophytes
- Clade: Angiosperms
- Clade: Magnoliids
- Order: Magnoliales
- Family: Annonaceae
- Subfamily: Malmeoideae
- Tribe: Miliuseae
- Genus: Phaeanthus
- Species: P. ophthalmicus

Binomial name
- Phaeanthus ophthalmicus (Roxb. ex G.Don) J.Sinclair

Synonyms
- Guatteria macropoda (Miq.) Zipp. ex Burck; Monoon macropodum Miq.; Phaeanthus crassipetalus var. papuanus Scheff.; Phaeanthus cumingii Miq.; Phaeanthus ebracteolatus (C.Presl) Merr.; Phaeanthus macropodus (Miq.) Diels; Phaeanthus macropodus var. mollifolius Diels; Phaeanthus nigrescens Elmer; Phaeanthus nitidus Merr.; Phaeanthus nutans Hook.f. & Thomson; Phaeanthus pubescens Merr.; Phaeanthus schefferi Boerl. ex Koord.-Schum.; Polyalthia macropoda (Miq.) F.Muell.; Unona tripetala Blanco; Uvaria ebracteolata C.Presl; Uvaria ophthalmica Roxb. ex G.Don; Uvaria tripetala Blanco; Uvaria tripetala Roxb.

Species of flowering plant

Phaeanthus ophthalmicus (synonym Polyalthia macropoda) is a species of flowering plant in the family Annonaceae and tribe Miliuseae. It is a tree native to tropical Asia, which ranges from Peninsular Malaysia to Borneo, the Philippines, Sulawesi, the Lesser Sunda Islands, the Maluku Islands, and New Guinea.
