= Gustaf Oskar Andersson Malme =

Swedish botanist (1864–1937)

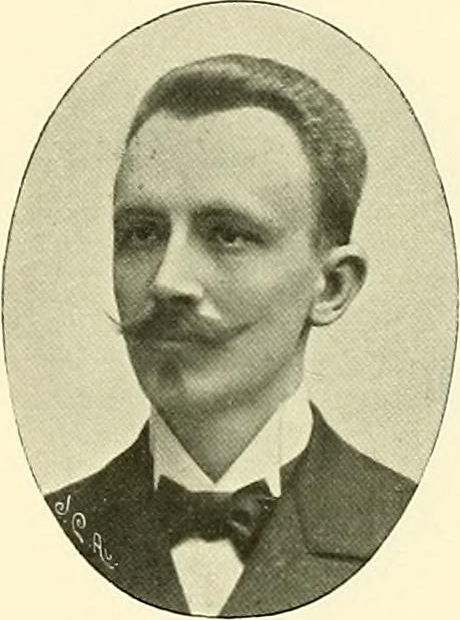
Gustaf Oskar Andersson Malme (1900)

Gustaf Oskar Andersson Malme (24 October 1864, Stora Malm in Södermanland County – 5 March 1937) was a Swedish botanist.

He studied at Uppsala University, earning his PhD in 1892. From 1895 - 1905, he was a curator at the Swedish Museum of Natural History in Stockholm. Then from 1905 to 1911, he was a lecturer in biology and chemistry at Högre Latinläroverket in Stockholm. Afterwards, he taught classes in zoology and biology at a teachers' training college in Stockholm.

By way of a travel grant established by Anders Fredrik Regnell, Malme along with botanist Carl Axel Magnus Lindman undertook an expedition to Brazil (exploring Rio Grande do Sul and Mato Grosso) and the central parts of Paraguay in 1892–1894. On the mission, the two men collected more than 5000 specimens. In 1901-1903, Malme returned to South America, where he revisited Brazil and also traveled to areas in Paraguay and Argentina (Mendoza Province).

He was the author of over 100 articles in the journal Kungliga Svenska Vetenskapsakademiens Handlingar and edited two exsiccatae, one ot them the well-known series Lichenes Suecici exsiccati.

The fungi genus Malmeomyces is named after him, as are the plant genera Malmea (family Annonaceae), described by Robert Elias Fries in 1905, and Malmeanthus (family Asteraceae, 1980, Robert Merrill King and Harold Ernest Robinson) He is also honoured with Malmidea which is a genus of lichens (the family Malmideaceae) and published by Rivas Plata, E.; Lücking, R.; Lumbsch, H .T. (2011), and Malmographina (lichen genus in the family Graphidaceae, M.Cáceres, E.Rivas Plata & R.Lücking, 2012).

== See also ==
- Category:Taxa named by Gustaf Oskar Andersson Malme
