= Quercus treubiana =

Conservation status
- Vulnerable (IUCN 3.1)

Scientific classification
- Kingdom: Plantae
- Clade: Embryophytes
- Clade: Tracheophytes
- Clade: Spermatophytes
- Clade: Angiosperms
- Clade: Eudicots
- Clade: Rosids
- Order: Fagales
- Family: Fagaceae
- Genus: Quercus
- Subgenus: Quercus subg. Cerris
- Section: Quercus sect. Cyclobalanopsis
- Species: Q. treubiana

Binomial name
- Quercus treubiana Seemen

Synonyms
- Cyclobalanopsis treubiana (Seemen) Schottky

Species of oak tree

Quercus treubiana is a member of the Quercus (oak) genus, placed in subgenus Cerris, section Cyclobalanopsis. It is found in the tropical mountain forests of Borneo and Sumatra at from 600 to 2200 metres elevation. It is named for Melchior Treub, 1851–1910, who was until 1909 Director of the Bogor Botanical Gardens, Indonesia. It was first formally named by Karl Otto von Seemen in 1906 in the Bulletin de Département de l'Agriculture aux Indes Néerlandaises (Buitenzorg / Bogor). It is also been referred to as Cyclobalanopsis treubiana (Seemen) (see: Schottky, Bot. Jahrb. Syst. 47: 648 (1912)).
