= Trichosphaerella buckii =

Scientific classification
- Kingdom: Fungi
- Division: Ascomycota
- Class: Sordariomycetes
- Order: Hypocreales
- Family: Niessliaceae
- Genus: Trichosphaerella
- Species: T. buckii

Binomial name
- Trichosphaerella buckii R.C.Harris & Lendemer (2016)

Species of fungus

Trichosphaerella buckii is a species of lichenicolous fungus in the family Niessliaceae. It was described as a new species in 2016 by Richard C. Harris and James Lendemer. The type was found growing immersed in a moribund thallus of the lichen Punctelia rudecta, which itself was on the trunk of a maple tree. This tree was in the Alligator River Game Land, in the Coastal Plain region of eastern North Carolina. Although at the time of publication the fungus was known only from the type locality, it was suspected to have a larger distribution, considering its lichen host has a widespread North American distribution.
