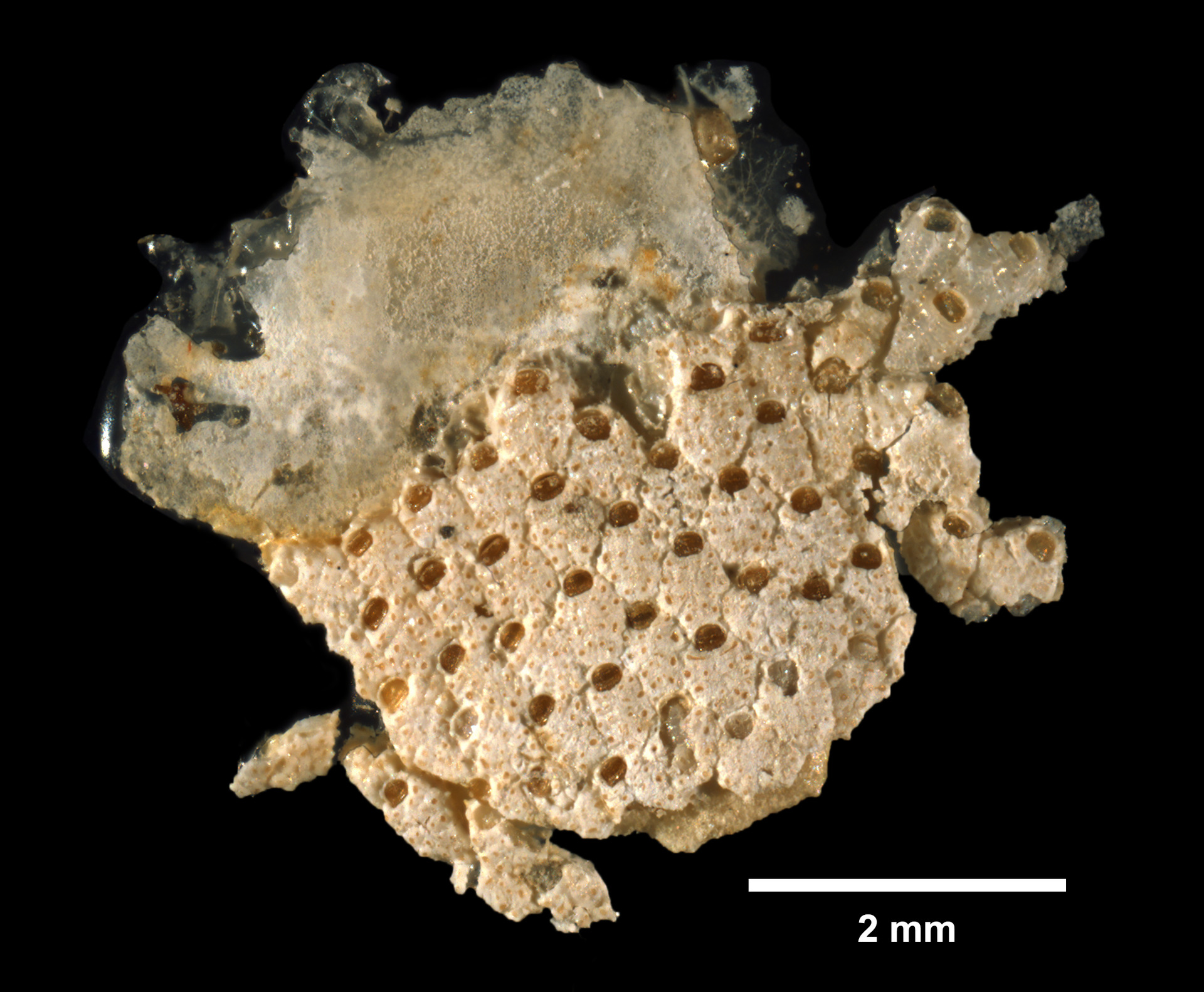

Scientific classification
- Kingdom: Animalia
- Phylum: Bryozoa
- Class: Gymnolaemata
- Order: Cheilostomatida
- Suborder: Flustrina
- Superfamily: Cribrilinoidea
- Family: Cribrilinidae; Hincks, 1879

Genera
- See classification

= Cribrilinidae =

Cribrilinidae Temporal range: Late Cretaceous - Recent

Family of moss animals

The Cribrilinidae family is a part of the suborder Flustrina within the bryozoans. They are characterized by numerous spinose ribs (costae) overarching the frontal membrane of each zooid.

The family was first described by Thomas Hincks in 1879.

== Classification ==
The diverse nature of the large number of genera included in this family (115) may require it to be split into several families.

- Family Cribrilinidae

- Genus Abdomenopora
- Genus Acanthobaktron
- Genus Aeolopora
- Genus Anaptopora
- Genus Anaskopora
- Genus Andriopora
- Genus Angelopora
- Genus Anornithopora
- Genus Anotopora
- Genus Argopora
- Genus Ascancestor† Voigt & Gordon, 1995
- Genus Auchenopora
- Genus Baptopora
- Genus Batrachopora
- Genus Callistopora
- Genus Calpidopora
- Genus Canupora
- Genus Carydiopora
- Genus Castanopora
- Genus Castanoporina
- Genus Cillia
- Genus Coelopora
- Genus Collarina
- Genus Confusocella† Voigt & Gordon, 1995
- Genus Corbulipora
- Genus Corymboporella
- Genus Costula
- Genus Craticulacella
- Genus Cribralaria
- Genus Cribrendoecium
- Genus Cribrilaria
- Genus Cribrilina
- Genus Ctenopora
- Genus Decurtaria
- Genus Dendroperistoma
- Genus Diacanthopora
- Genus Diancopora
- Genus Diceratopora
- Genus Dishelopora
- Genus Distansescharella
- Genus Disteginopora
- Genus Eucheilopora
- Genus Figularia
- Genus Filaguria
- Genus Francopora
- Genus Geisopora
- Genus Gephyrotes
- Genus Gordoniella
- Genus Glabrilaria
- Genus Graptoporella
- Genus Haplocephalopora
- Genus Hayamiellina
- Genus Hesperopora
- Genus Hexacanthopora
- Genus Hippiopora
- Genus Holostegopora
- Genus Hybopora
- Genus Hystricopora
- Genus Ichnopora
- Genus Inversiscaphos
- Genus Jolietina
- Genus Jullienula
- Genus Kankopora
- Genus Kelestoma
- Genus Keratostoma
- Genus Klugerella
- Genus Lagynopora
- Genus Lepralina
- Genus Leptocheilopora
- Genus Membraniporella
- Genus Metracolposa
- Genus Monoceratopora
- Genus Morphasmopora
- Genus Multescharipora
- Genus Mumiella
- Genus Murinopsia
- Genus Myagropora
- Genus Nannopora
- Genus Oligotopora
- Genus Opisthornithopora
- Genus Otopora
- Genus Pachydera
- Genus Pancheilopora
- Genus Parafigularia
- Genus Pelmatopora
- Genus Phractoporella
- Genus Phrynopora
- Genus Pleuroschizella
- Genus Pliophloea
- Genus Pnictopora
- Genus Polycephalopora
- Genus Polyceratopora
- Genus Prodromopora
- Genus Prosotopora
- Genus Puellina
- Genus Reginella
- Genus Reginelloides
- Genus Reptescharella
- Genus Reptescharipora
- Genus Reptoporella
- Genus Rhabdopora
- Genus Rhacheopora
- Genus Rhiniopora
- Genus Sandalopora
- Genus Schistacanthopora
- Genus Semiescharipora
- Genus Steginopora
- Genus Stichocados
- Genus Taractopora
- Genus Thoracopora
- Genus Tricephalopora
- Genus Turnerellina
- Genus Ubaghsia
- Genus Vavropora
- Genus Vicariopora
