= Niesslia peltigerae =

Scientific classification
- Kingdom: Fungi
- Division: Ascomycota
- Class: Sordariomycetes
- Order: Hypocreales
- Family: Niessliaceae
- Genus: Niesslia
- Species: N. peltigerae

Binomial name
- Niesslia peltigerae Pérez-Ort. (2020)

Species of fungus

Niesslia peltigerae is a species of lichenicolous (lichen-dwelling) fungus in the family Niessliaceae. It was discovered in 2020 in Alaska's Glacier Bay National Park and Preserve, where it grows as a parasite on the lichen Peltigera kristinssonii. The fungus produces tiny black, flask-shaped fruiting bodies covered with stiff dark hairs that are barely visible to the naked eye at less than a quarter of a millimeter across.

== Taxonomy ==
The fungus was described as a new species in 2020 by the lichenologist Sergio Pérez-Ortega. The type specimen was collected in the Hoonah-Angoon Census Area of Glacier Bay National Park and Preserve, in muskeg and forest. The fungus was growing parasitically on the lichen Peltigera kristinssonii, which itself was growing on mountain hemlock (Tsuga mertensiana). The specific epithet peltigerae alludes to the genus of its host.

== Description ==
Niesslia peltigerae produces small, flask-shaped fruiting bodies (ascomata) that sit directly on the upper surface of its host lichen. Each ascoma is 170–240 micrometres (μm) in diameter—barely the width of a human hair—and clusters tightly with its neighbors. When fresh they are nearly spherical and jet-black; in dry weather they collapse into shallow cups. The surface bristles with stiff, dark brown hairs (setae) that taper to a point, are 45–95 μm long, and about 12 μm wide at the base. A tiny central pore (the ostiole) pierces the top, allowing mature spores to escape. Beneath the hairs, the ascoma wall (exciple) consists of flattened, dark brown cells that form a tough outer shell.

Under the microscope, a ring of colorless, short filaments (periphyses) encircles the ostiole, but the filaments that normally weave through the spore layer (paraphyses) are absent in mature specimens. The spore sacs (asci) are club-shaped with a narrow stalk, have a single wall (unitunicate), and hold eight ascospores apiece; they measure 23–30 × 5–6 μm and do not change color in iodine stains. Inside, the spores are arranged in two rows (biseriate), colorless, and shaped like slim footballs. Each spore has a single cross-wall (septum), ends that are gently rounded, and typically one or two tiny oil droplets (guttules) in each cell; dimensions are 6–8 × 2.5–3 μm. No asexual reproductive structures have been observed.

== Habitat and distribution ==
Niesslia peltigerae is known only from its type locality in Glacier Bay National Park, where it grows on Peltigera kristinssonii in Tsuga mertensiana parkland. Infection by the fungus bleaches the thallus of the host lichen. It is one of four Niesslia species that have been recorded from Alaska.
