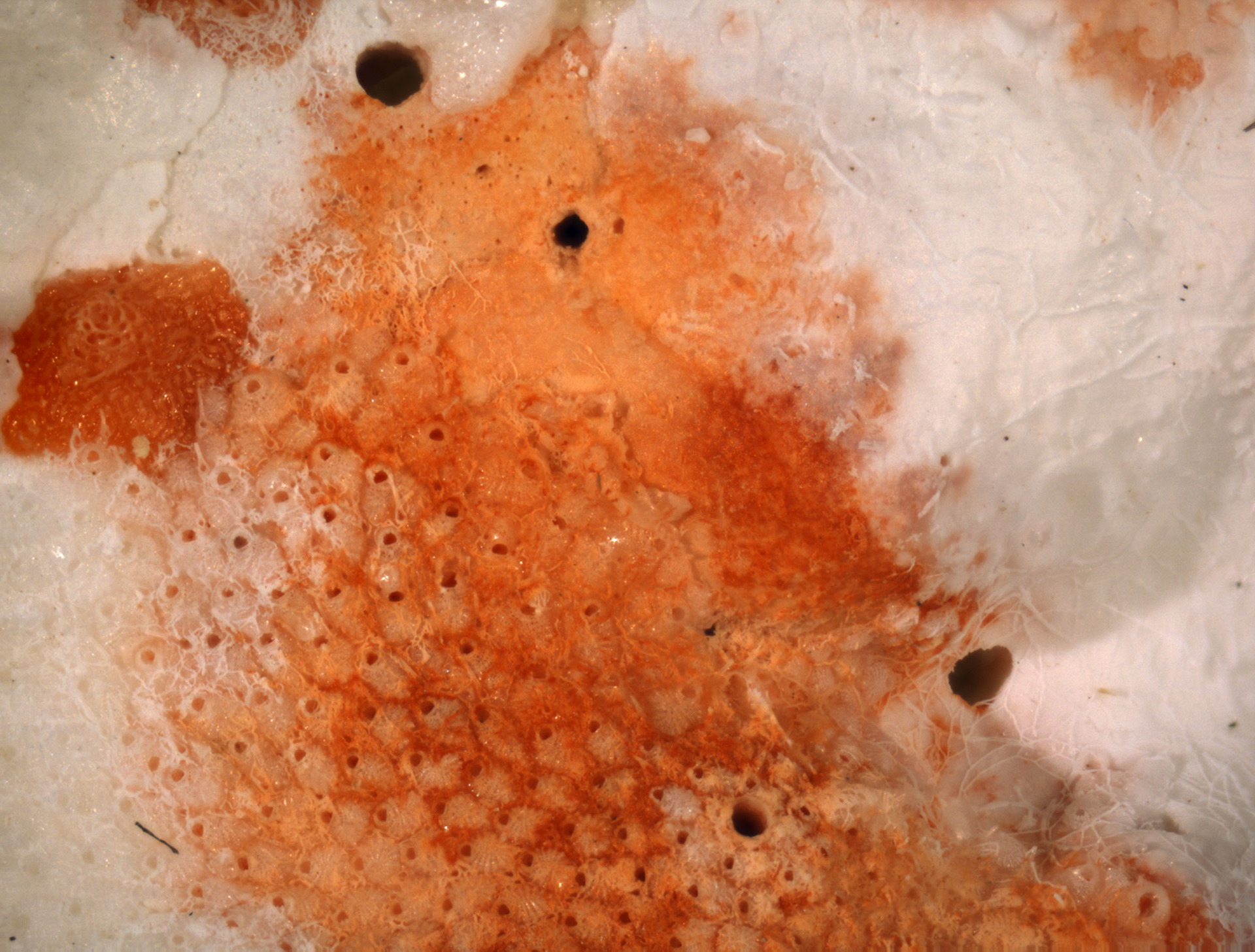
- Cribrilaria sp.

Scientific classification
- Kingdom: Animalia
- Phylum: Bryozoa
- Class: Gymnolaemata
- Order: Cheilostomatida
- Family: Cribrilinidae
- Genus: Cribrilaria; Canu & Bassler, 1929

= Cribrilaria =

Genus of bryozoans

Cribrilaria is a genus of bryozoans belonging to the family Cribrilinidae.

The genus has cosmopolitan distribution.

Species:

- Cribrilaria antoniettae Ramalho & Moraes, 2021
- Cribrilaria arrecta Bishop & Househam, 1987
- Cribrilaria bathyalis Harmelin & Aristegui, 1988
- Cribrilaria bifida (d'Hondt, 1970)
- Cribrilaria californiensis Soule, Soule & Chaney, 1995
- Cribrilaria cassidainsis Harmelin, 1984
- Cribrilaria crenatimargo (Reuss, 1848)
- Cribrilaria denticulata Harmelin & Aristegui, 1988
- Cribrilaria harmelini Winston & Jackson, 2021
- Cribrilaria harmeri Ristedt, 1985
- Cribrilaria haueri (Reuss, 1848)
- Cribrilaria hexaspinosa Harmelin, 1978
- Cribrilaria hincksii (Friedl, 1917)
- Cribrilaria innominata (Couch, 1844)
- Cribrilaria kollmanni David & Pouyet, 1974
- Cribrilaria lagaaiji Bishop & Hayward, 1989
- Cribrilaria larwoodi Guha & Gopikrishna, 2007
- Cribrilaria lateralis Ramalho & Moraes, 2021
- Cribrilaria mikelae (Harmelin, 2006)
- Cribrilaria minima Harmelin, 1984
- Cribrilaria multicostata Flórez, Di Martino & Ramalho, 2021
- Cribrilaria nixor Flórez, Di Martino & Ramalho, 2021
- Cribrilaria octospinosa Harmelin, 1978
- Cribrilaria parisiensis (Canu, 1926)
- Cribrilaria parva Winston & Hakansson, 1986
- Cribrilaria paschalis Moyano, 1973
- Cribrilaria perplexa Soule, Soule & Chaney, 1995
- Cribrilaria picardi Harmelin, 1988
- Cribrilaria profunda Rosso, Di Martino & Ostrovsky, 2020
- Cribrilaria pseudoradiata Harmelin & Aristegui, 1988
- Cribrilaria radiata (Moll, 1803)
- Cribrilaria rarecostata (Reuss, 1848)
- Cribrilaria reflexa Winston & Jackson, 2021
- Cribrilaria saginata (Winston, 2005)
- Cribrilaria saldanhai (Harmelin, 2001)
- Cribrilaria setiformis Harmelin & Aristegui, 1988
- Cribrilaria smitti (Winston, 2005)
- Cribrilaria taylori Guha & Nathan, 1996
- Cribrilaria variabilis David, Mongereau & Pouyet, 1970
- Cribrilaria venusta (Canu & Bassler, 1925)
