= Theodor Rudolph Joseph Nitschke =

German botanist and mycologist (1834–1883)

- Born: Theodor Rudolph Joseph Nitschke; 26 June 1834; Breslau, Germany
- Died: 12 December 1883 (aged 49); Münster, Germany
- Education: University of Breslau (PhD)
- Occupations: Botanist and mycologist
- Relatives: Geertruyd (sister) Marten van Sittard (cousin)
- Scientific career
- Workplaces: University of Münster

Theodor Rudolph Joseph Nitschke (26 July 1834, Breslau – 12 December 1883, Münster) was a Silesian-born German botanist and mycologist. He received his education in Breslau, obtaining his PhD in 1858. In 1860 he relocated to Münster, where in 1867 he was named professor of botany at the university, also serving as director of the botanical academy and botanical garden.

In his earlier research he was interested in angiosperms such as the genus Rosa and the species Drosera rotundifolia (common sundew), From the late 1860s, he focused on mycology, publishing significant works on the fungal class Pyrenomycetes.

The fungal genera Acanthonitschkea, Nitschkia and Nitschkiopsis are named in his honor.

== Selected works ==
- "Commentatio anatomico-physiologica de Droserae rotundifoliae", (1858).
- "Pyrenomycetes germanici", (1867 to 1870).

== See also ==
- Category:Taxa named by Theodor Rudolph Joseph Nitschke
