= Trichosphaerella =

Scientific classification
- Kingdom: Fungi
- Division: Ascomycota
- Class: Sordariomycetes
- Order: Hypocreales
- Family: Niessliaceae
- Genus: Trichosphaerella; E.Bommer, M.Rousseau & Sacc. (1890)

Type species
- Trichosphaerella decipiens E.Bommer, M.Rousseau & Sacc. (1891)

Species
- T. arecae T. buckii T. ceratophora T. decipiens T. foliicola T. goniospora T. tuberculata

Synonyms
- Bresadolella Höhn. (1903); Larseniella Munk (1942); Neorehmia Höhn. (1902); Oplotheciopsis Bat. & Cif. (1963); Oplothecium Syd. & P.Syd. (1923); Trichohleria Sacc. (1908)

Genus of fungi

Trichosphaerella is a genus of lichenicolous fungi in the family Niessliaceae.

== Species ==
As of February 2024, Species Fungorum (in the Catalogue of Life) accepts 7 species of Trichosphaerella:

- Trichosphaerella arecae (Syd.) E.Müll. (1965)
- Trichosphaerella buckii R.C.Harris & Lendemer (2016)
- Trichosphaerella ceratophora (Höhn.) E.Müll. (1962)
- Trichosphaerella decipiens Sacc., E.Bommer & M.Rousseau (1890)
- Trichosphaerella foliicola Bat. & J.L.Bezerra (1964)
- Trichosphaerella goniospora Döbbeler, W.R.Buck & P.G.Davison (2015)
- Trichosphaerella tuberculata Samuels (1983)
