= Melchior Treub =

Dutch botanist

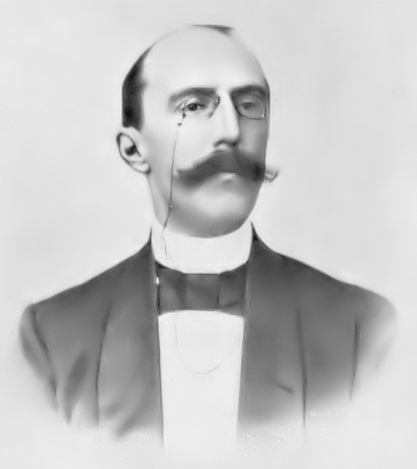
- Born: 26 December 1851; Voorschoten, the Netherlands
- Died: 3 October 1910 (aged 58); Saint-Raphaël, Var, France
- Education: University of Leiden
- Known for: Work on tropical flora of Java
- Scientific career
- Fields: Botany
- Institutions: Bogor Botanical Gardens, Buitenzorg Landbouw Hogeschool
- Author abbrev. (botany): Treub

-

Melchior Treub (26 December 1851 – 3 October 1910) was a Dutch botanist. He worked at the Bogor Botanical Gardens in Buitenzorg on the island of Java, south of Batavia, Dutch East Indies, gaining attention for his work on tropical flora. He also founded the Bogor Agricultural Institute. He traveled and collected across many areas of Southeast Asia.

He was born in Voorschoten, and in 1873 he graduated in biology from the University of Leiden. Subsequently, he remained in Leiden as a botanical assistant. From 1880 to 1909 he was a botanist based in the Dutch East Indies.

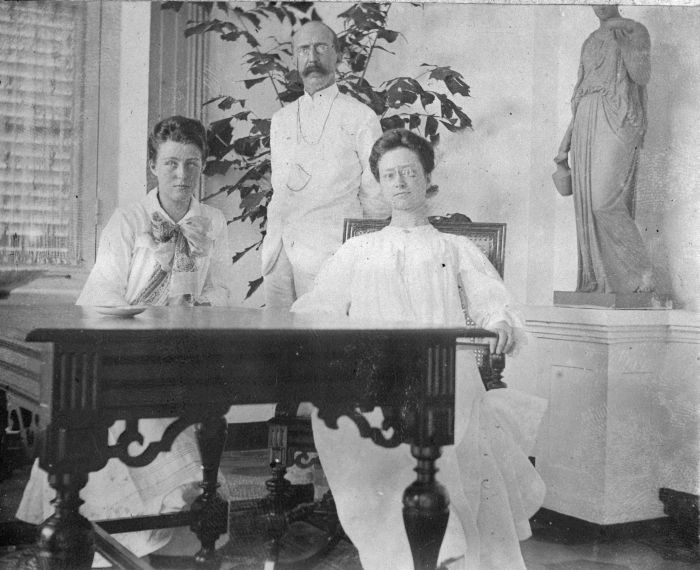
Melchior Treub with Netty and Louise Treub, Buitenzorg, June 15, 1904

In 1879 he was appointed a member of the Royal Dutch Academy of Sciences (KNAW) and was appointed as director of Bogor Botanical Gardens' Lands Plantentuin in Buitenzorg (Bogor) in the year 1880. Treub worked on tropical flora on Java and organized the Botanical Garden as a scientific institution of botany. Under his leadership many crucial researches were successfully completed on plant diseases of economic crops.

In 1903 he established the Buitenzorg Landbouw Hogeschool, a school that later evolved into the Bogor Agricultural Institute. In 1905 he became director of the newly established Department of Agriculture in the Dutch East Indies. In 1907 Treub was the recipient of the Linnean Medal for his outstanding achievements in sciences. The Dutch "Society for the Promotion of the Physical Exploration of the Dutch Colonies" is sometimes referred to as the Treub Maatschappij.

As a botanical collector, he travelled throughout the Indies, and to the Philippines, Sri Lanka, Singapore and Penang. He was interested in plant morphology and physiology, and published treatises on the morphology of Balanophoraceae, Loranthaceae and Lycopodiaceae. He is credited for coining the term "protocorm" to describe the early stages in the germination of lycopods.

He worked for nearly 30 years at the gardens before returning to the Netherlands in 1909 due to his worsening health. Dr. Treub then settled on the village of Saint-Raphael on French Riviera, where he died in 1910.

== Honours ==
The liverwort genus Treubia was named in his honor by Karl Ritter von Goebel in 1891. Then in 1897, Albert Julius Otto Penzig and Pier Andrea Saccardo published Melchioria, which is a genus of fungi within the Niessliaceae family. Treubaria is a genus of green algae in the family Treubariaceae that was circumscribed by Charles Jean Bernard in 1908. In 1909, Franz Xaver Rudolf von Höhnel published Treubiomyces which is a genus of fungi in the family Chaetothyriaceae. Lastly, Apotreubia is a genus of liverworts in the family of Treubiaceae, which was published by S.Hatt & Mizut. in 1967.
