= Paraniesslia =

Scientific classification
- Kingdom: Fungi
- Division: Ascomycota
- Class: Sordariomycetes
- Order: Hypocreales
- Family: Niessliaceae
- Genus: Paraniesslia; K.M. Tsui, K.D. Hyde & Hodgkiss

Type species
- Paraniesslia tuberculata K.M. Tsui, K.D. Hyde & Hodgkiss

Species
- Paraniesslia aquatica Paraniesslia tuberculata

Genus of fungi

Paraniesslia is a genus of fungi within the Niessliaceae family. There are 2 species
