= Cryptoniesslia =

Scientific classification
- Kingdom: Fungi
- Division: Ascomycota
- Class: Sordariomycetes
- Order: Hypocreales
- Family: Niessliaceae
- Genus: Cryptoniesslia; Scheuer

Type species
- Cryptoniesslia setulosa Scheuer

Genus of fungi

Cryptoniesslia is a genus of fungi within the Niessliaceae family. This is a monotypic genus, containing the single species Cryptoniesslia setulosa.
