= Pseudonectriella =

Scientific classification
- Kingdom: Fungi
- Division: Ascomycota
- Class: Sordariomycetes
- Order: Hypocreales
- Family: Niessliaceae
- Genus: Pseudonectriella; Petr.

Type species
- Pseudonectriella ahmadii Petr. 1959

Genus of fungi

Pseudonectriella is a genus of fungi within the Niessliaceae family. This is a monotypic genus, containing the single species Pseudonectriella ahmadii.
