= Taiwanascus =

Scientific classification
- Kingdom: Fungi
- Division: Ascomycota
- Class: Sordariomycetes
- Order: Hypocreales
- Family: Niessliaceae
- Genus: Taiwanascus; Sivan. & H.S.Chang (1997)

Type species
- Taiwanascus tetrasporus Sivan. & H.S.Chang (1997)

Species
- T. samuelsii T. tetrasporus

Genus of fungi

Taiwanascus is a genus of fungi in the family Niessliaceae. It was circumscribed in 2007 to contain the type, Taiwanascus tetrasporus, found growing on dead wood in Taipei, Taiwan. T. samuelsii, described from the Western Ghats, India, was added to the genus in 2013.
