= Valetoniellopsis =

Scientific classification
- Kingdom: Fungi
- Division: Ascomycota
- Class: Sordariomycetes
- Order: Hypocreales
- Family: Niessliaceae
- Genus: Valetoniellopsis; Samuels & M.E. Barr

Type species
- Valetoniellopsis laxa Samuels & M.E. Barr

Genus of fungi

Valetoniellopsis is a genus of fungi within the Niessliaceae family. This is a monotypic genus, containing the single species Valetoniellopsis laxa.
