= Malmeomyces =

Scientific classification
- Kingdom: Fungi
- Division: Ascomycota
- Class: Sordariomycetes
- Order: Hypocreales
- Family: Niessliaceae
- Genus: Malmeomyces; Starbäck

Type species
- Malmeomyces pulchellus Starbäck

Synonyms
- Chaetothyrium pulchellum (Starbäck) Theiss. (1913)

Genus of fungi

Malmeomyces is a genus of fungi within the Niessliaceae family. This is a monotypic genus, containing the single species Malmeomyces pulchellus Starbäck.

The genus name of Malmeomyces is in honour of Gustaf Oskar Andersson Malme (1864-1937), who was a Swedish botanist.

The genus was circumscribed by Karl Starbäck in Bih. Kongl. Svenska Vetensk.-Akad. Handl. vol.25 (Afd. 3,1): [3]-4, 32 in 1899.
