= Melchioria =

Scientific classification
- Kingdom: Fungi
- Division: Ascomycota
- Class: Sordariomycetes
- Order: Hypocreales
- Family: Niessliaceae
- Genus: Melchioria; Penz. & Sacc.

Type species
- Melchioria leucomelaena Penz. & Sacc.

Genus of fungi

Melchioria is a genus of fungi within the Niessliaceae family.

The genus was circumscribed by Albert Julius Otto Penzig and Pier Andrea Saccardo in Malpighia vol.11 on page 399 in 1897.

The genus name of Melchioria is in honour of Melchior Treub (1851–1910), who was a Dutch botanist. He worked at the Bogor Botanical Gardens in Buitenzorg on the island of Java, south of Batavia, Dutch East Indies, gaining renown for his work on tropical flora.

== Species ==
As accepted by Species Fungorum;

- Melchioria calospora (Speg.) E. Müll. (1962)
- Melchioria leucomelaena Penz. & Sacc. (1897)
- Melchioria maeshimana (I. Hino & Katum.) I. Hino & Katum. (1968)
- Melchioria philippinensis (Rehm) I. Hino & Katum. (1968)
- Melchioria pseudosasae I. Hino & Katum. (1968)
- Melchioria tengii E. Müll. (1962)
