= Collarina =

#REDIRECT Niesslia

- From alternative scientific name of a fungus: This is a redirect from an alternative scientific name of a fungus (or group of fungi) to the accepted scientific name.
