= Klugerella =

Scientific classification
- Kingdom: Animalia
- Phylum: Bryozoa
- Class: Gymnolaemata
- Order: Cheilostomatida
- Family: Cribrilinidae
- Genus: Klugerella; Moyano, 1991

Genus of bryozoans

Klugerella is a genus of bryozoans belonging to the family Cribrilinidae.

The species of this genus are found in the Americas, New Zealand, Malesia, near Antarctica.

Species:

- Klugerella antarctica (Kluge, 1914)
- Klugerella aragoi (Audouin, 1826)
- Klugerella bifurca (Powell, 1967)
- Klugerella gordoni Moyano, 1991
- Klugerella magnifica (Thornely, 1912)
- Klugerella marcusi (Cook, 1967)
- Klugerella musica Gordon, 1993
- Klugerella olasoi López de la Cuadra & García-Gómez, 2000
- Klugerella petasus (Canu & Bassler, 1928)
