= Valetoniella =

Scientific classification
- Kingdom: Fungi
- Division: Ascomycota
- Class: Sordariomycetes
- Order: Hypocreales
- Family: Niessliaceae
- Genus: Valetoniella; Höhn.

Type species
- Valetoniella crucipila Höhn.

Genus of fungi

Valetoniella is a genus of fungi within the Niessliaceae family. The genus contains three species.

The genus was circumscribed by Franz Xaver Rudolf von Höhnel in Sitzungsber. Kaiserl. Akad. Wiss. Wien, Math.-Nat. Abt. vol.1, 118: 1499 in 1909.

The genus name of Valetoniella is in honour of Theodoric Valeton (1855-1929), who was a Dutch botanist who went to Indonesia.

== Species ==
As accepted by Species Fungorum;

- Valetoniella claviornata Samuels & M.E. Barr (1998)
- Valetoniella crucipila Höhn. (1909)
- Valetoniella pauciornata Samuels & M.E. Barr (1998)
