= Myrmaeciella =

Scientific classification
- Kingdom: Fungi
- Division: Ascomycota
- Class: Sordariomycetes
- Order: Hypocreales
- Family: Niessliaceae
- Genus: Myrmaeciella; Lindau

Type species
- Myrmaeciella endoleuca (Sacc.) Lindau

Species
- M. endoleuca M. hoehneliana

Genus of fungi

Myrmaeciella is a genus of fungi within the Niessliaceae family. The genus contains 2 species.
