= Jullienula =

Scientific classification
- Kingdom: Animalia
- Phylum: Bryozoa
- Class: Gymnolaemata
- Order: Cheilostomatida
- Family: Cribrilinidae
- Genus: Jullienula; Bassler, 1953

Genus of bryozoans

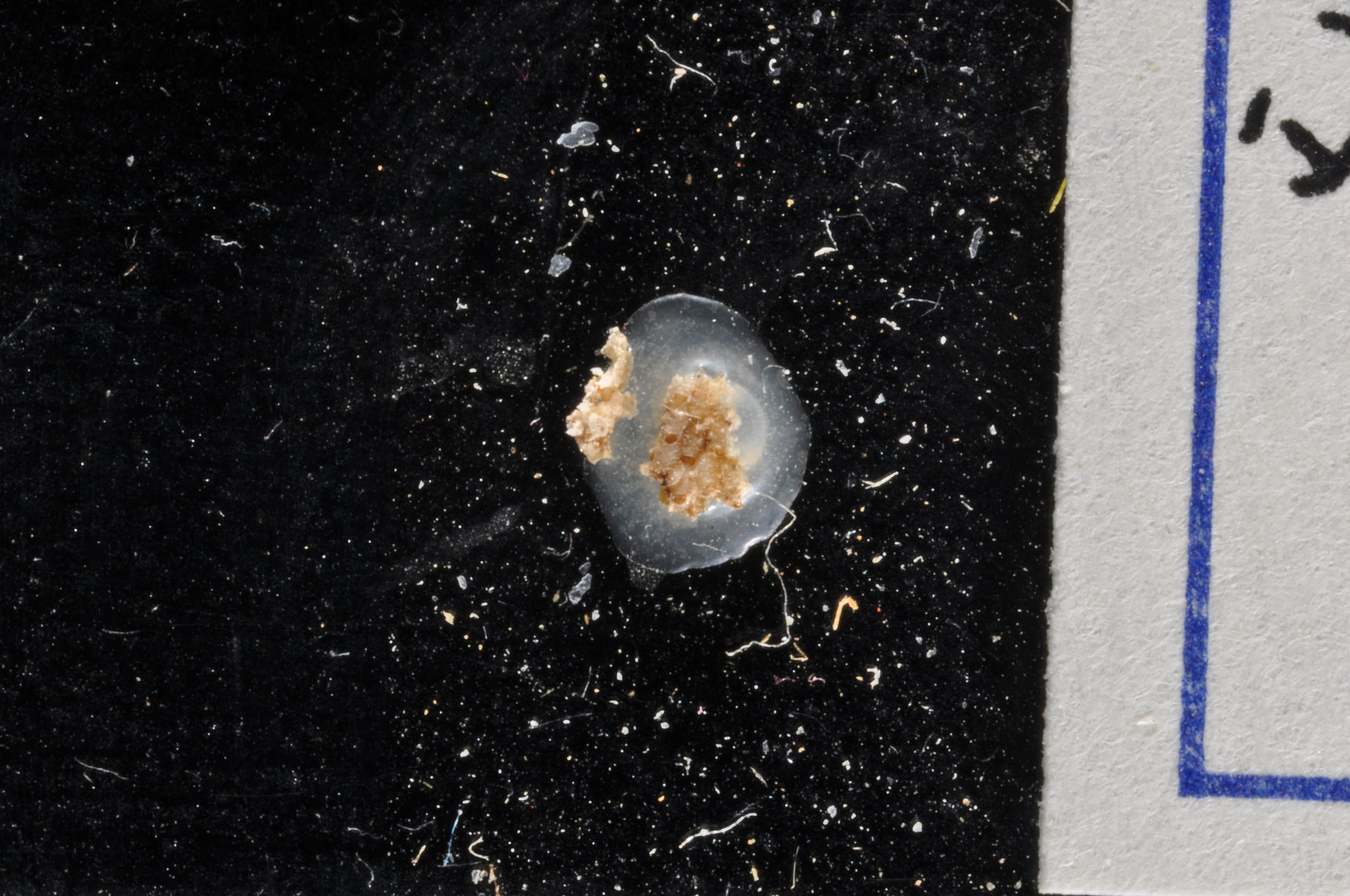
Jullienula, preserved specimen

Jullienula is a genus of bryozoans belonging to the family Cribrilinidae.

The species of this genus are found in North America.

Species:

- Jullienula erinae Yang, Seo, Min, Grischenko & Gordon, 2018
- Jullienula hippocrepis (Hincks, 1882)
- Jullienula kaigarabashiensis Hayami, 1975
