= Miyakeomyces =

Scientific classification
- Kingdom: Fungi
- Division: Ascomycota
- Class: Sordariomycetes
- Order: Hypocreales
- Family: Niessliaceae
- Genus: Miyakeomyces; Hara

Type species
- Miyakeomyces bambusae Hara

Genus of fungi

Miyakeomyces is a genus of fungi within the Niessliaceae family. This is a monotypic genus, containing the single species Miyakeomyces bambusae.
