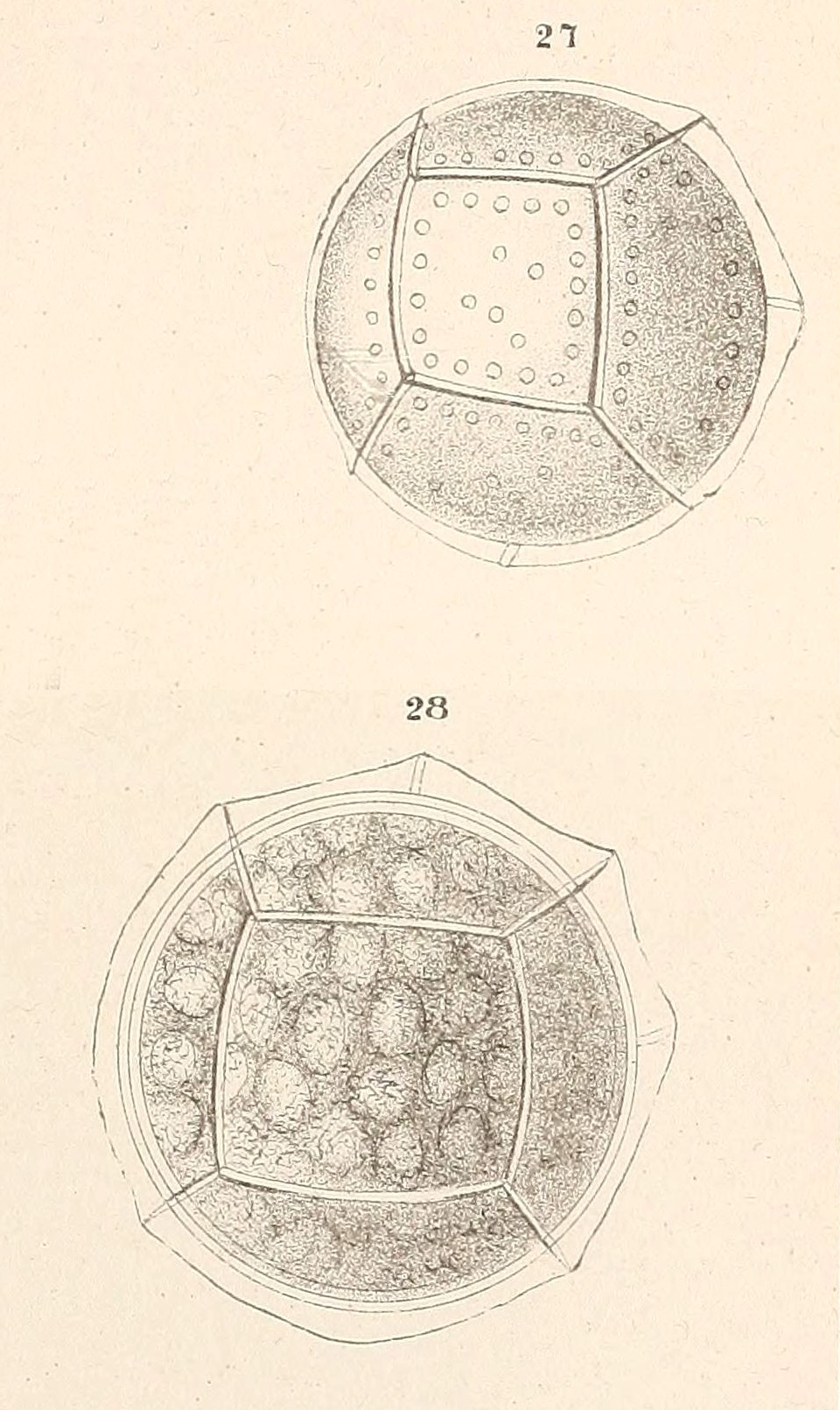
- Trochiscia dictyon

Scientific classification
- Clade: Viridiplantae
- Division: Chlorophyta
- Class: Trebouxiophyceae
- Order: Chlorellales
- Family: Oocystaceae
- Genus: Trochiscia; Kützing

Species
- Trochiscia hystrix

= Trochiscia =

Genus of algae

Trochiscia is a genus of green algae in the family Oocystaceae. It is found in the plankton of freshwater habitats. The name Trochiscia was used in 1834 by Friedrich Traugott Kützing.

== Description ==
Trochiscia consists of solitary, spherical cells up to 50 μm in diameter. The cell walls are thick, and are variously sculptured with spines, ribs, reticulations, and or projections. Cells are uninucleate (one nucleus). The single chloroplast is variable in morphology, and may be stellate and axial or parietal, and may have or lack a pyrenoid. Asexual reproduction occurs by the formation of autospores or zoospores; sexual reproduction has not been observed.

Species of Trochiscia are distinguished based on details of cell morphology, particularly the sculpturing of the cell wall.

== Taxonomy ==
The taxonomy of Trochiscia is very unclear and in need of revision. The name Trochiscia was described twice by Kützing. His first description was in 1834, referring to a broad assemblage of green algae (including desmids) and diatoms). The second description was in 1845, he had defined the genus for single, spherical to ellipsoidal cells which were polygonal or covered with spines or tubercles. This definition is approximately the current circumscription of Trochiscia.

Because the current naming of Trochiscia is predated by one in 1834, Trochiscia is a later homonym and needs to be replaced according to the rules of botanical nomenclature. Currently, some of the species in Trochiscia were transferred to Glochiococcus. However, most names within Trochiscia are poorly known and their true affinities are unknown. In particular, many species of Trochiscia are likely to represent zygospores or aplanospores of other algae.

The species Trochiscia hystrix forms a previously-unknown lineage in the class Chlorophyceae, along with Golenkinia and Treubaria, but the relationships also need to be investigated further.
