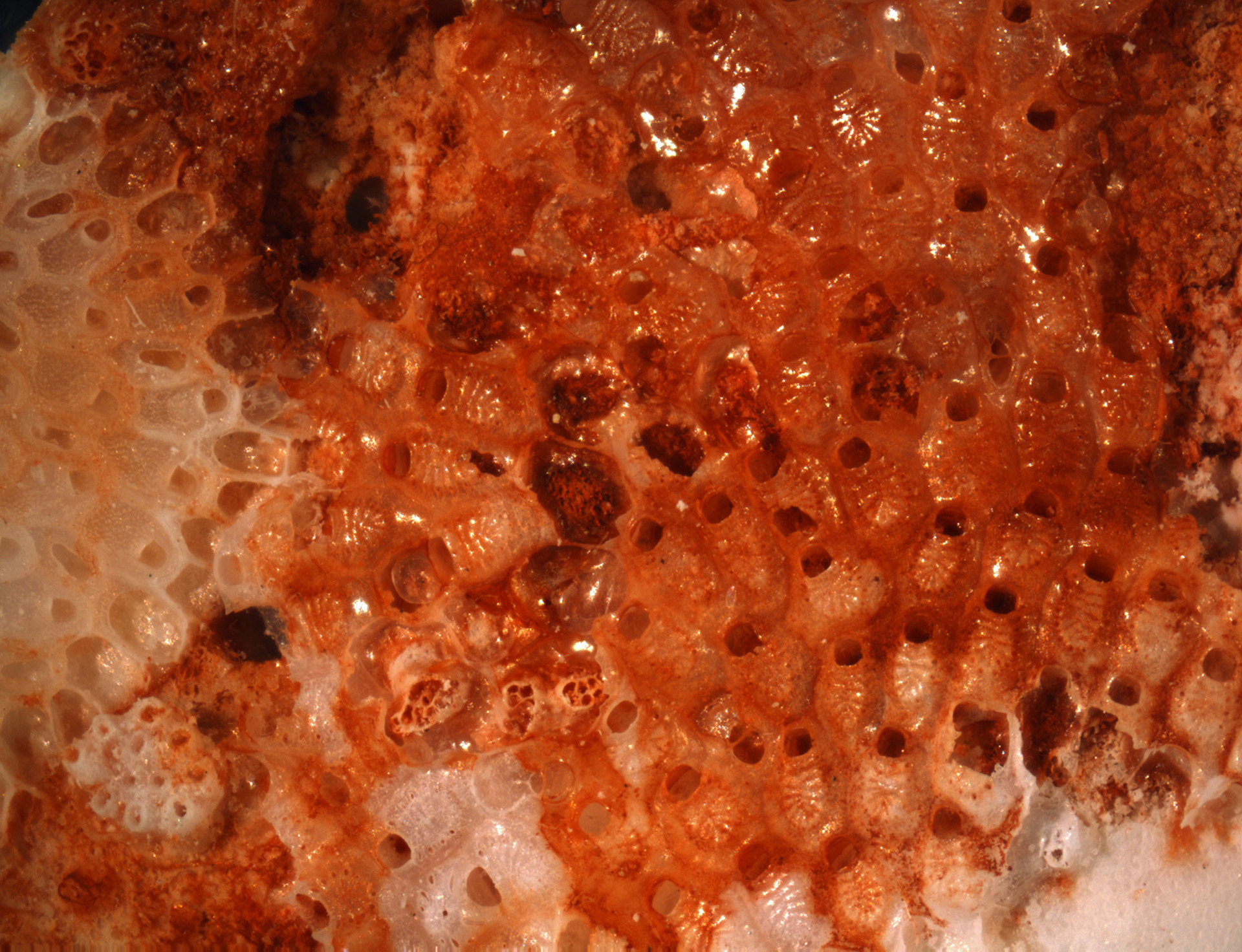
- Figularia sp.

Scientific classification
- Kingdom: Animalia
- Phylum: Bryozoa
- Class: Gymnolaemata
- Order: Cheilostomatida
- Family: Cribrilinidae
- Genus: Figularia; Jullien, 1886

= Figularia =

Genus of bryozoans

Figularia is a genus of bryozoans belonging to the family Cribrilinidae.

The genus has almost cosmopolitan distribution.

Species:

- Figularia arnouldi Buge, 1956
- Figularia bragai Flórez, Di Martino & Ramalho, 2021
- Figularia capitifera (Canu & Bassler, 1929)
- Figularia carinata (Waters, 1923)
- Figularia clithridiata (Waters, 1887)
- Figularia contraria Lagaaij, 1963
- Figularia crassicostulata Canu & Bassler, 1920
- Figularia dimorpha Figuerola, Gordon & Cristobo, 2018
- Figularia duvergieri Bassler, 1936
- Figularia echinoides Brown, 1952
- Figularia elcanoi López-Gappa, Pérez, Almeida, Iturra, Gordon & Vieira, 2021
- Figularia figularis (Johnston, 1847)
- Figularia fissa (Hincks, 1880)
- Figularia fissurata Canu & Bassler, 1929
- Figularia haueri (Reuss, 1848)
- Figularia hilli Osburn, 1950
- Figularia huttoni Uttley & Bullivant, 1972
- Figularia japonica Silén, 1941
- Figularia kenleyi Brown, 1958
- Figularia mernae Uttley & Bullivant, 1972
- Figularia ortmanni Silén, 1941
- Figularia pelmatifera Gordon, 1984
- Figularia peltata (Reuss, 1874)
- Figularia philomela (Busk, 1884)
- Figularia planicostulata Canu & Lecointre, 1928
- Figularia quaylei Powell, 1967
- Figularia rhodanica Li, 1990
- Figularia rugosa (Maplestone, 1901)
- Figularia ryukuensis Kataoka, 1961
- Figularia speciosa (Hincks, 1881)
- Figularia spectabilis Rosso, Di Martino & Ostrovsky, 2020
- Figularia spinea Brown, 1952
- Figularia tenuicosta (MacGillivray, 1895)
- Figularia triangula Powell, 1967
