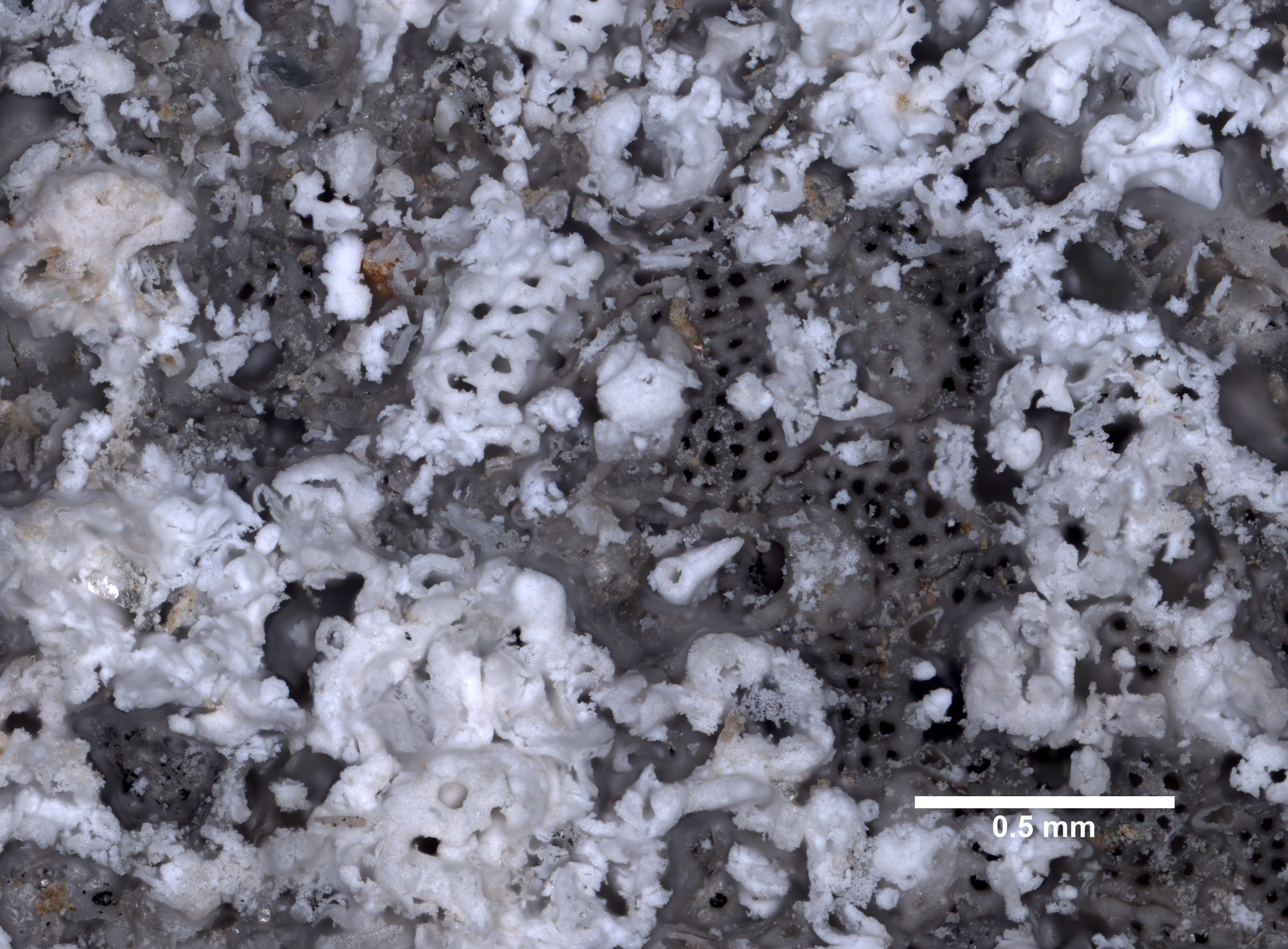

Scientific classification
- Kingdom: Animalia
- Phylum: Bryozoa
- Class: Gymnolaemata
- Order: Cheilostomatida
- Family: Cribrilinidae
- Genus: Cribrilina; Gray, 1848

= Cribrilina =

Genus of bryozoans

Cribrilina is a genus of bryozoans belonging to the family Cribrilinidae.

The genus has cosmopolitan distribution.

Species:

- Cribrilina auriculata Canu & Bassler, 1929
- Cribrilina collaris Marsson, 1887
- Cribrilina crassicollis Canu & Bassler, 1935
- Cribrilina cryptooecium Norman, 1903
- Cribrilina cuspidata Canu & Bassler, 1923
- Cribrilina dispersa O'Donoghue & de Watteville, 1937
- Cribrilina ferganensis Pheophanova, 1965
- Cribrilina flavomaris Yang, Seo, Min, Grischenko & Gordon, 2018
- Cribrilina gathensis Pouyet, 1997
- Cribrilina gilbertensis Maplestone, 1909
- Cribrilina hebetata (Waters, 1882)
- Cribrilina immersa (Gabb & Horn, 1862)
- Cribrilina indica (d'Orbigny, 1852)
- Cribrilina inermis Levinsen, 1925
- Cribrilina jonesi Brown, 1958
- Cribrilina laticostulata Canu & Bassler, 1920
- Cribrilina ligulata Canu & Bassler, 1923
- Cribrilina macropunctata Winston, Hayward & Craig, 2000
- Cribrilina marylandica (Ulrich & Bassler, 1904)
- Cribrilina messiniensis Pouyet & Moissette, 1986
- Cribrilina miocenica McGuirt, 1941
- Cribrilina mucronata Canu & Lecointre, 1927
- Cribrilina nevianii Cipolla, 1921
- Cribrilina paucicostata Hejjas, 1894
- Cribrilina punctata (Hassall, 1841)
- Cribrilina puncturata (Wood, 1844)
- Cribrilina pupoides (Reuss, 1872)
- Cribrilina rathbunae Canu & Bassler, 1920
- Cribrilina reniformis Ortmann, 1890
- Cribrilina rishtanensis Pheophanova, 1965
- Cribrilina simplex O'Donoghue & de Watteville, 1935
- Cribrilina sparsiporis Levinsen, 1925
- Cribrilina spiculifera Kluge, 1955
- Cribrilina spitzbergensis Norman, 1903
- Cribrilina subpunctata Canu, 1907
- Cribrilina tenuicostata Koschinsky, 1885
- Cribrilina triseriata Canu & Bassler, 1935
- Cribrilina turgida Maplestone, 1901
- Cribrilina tutaksaiensis Pheophanova, 1965
- Cribrilina verrucosa Canu & Bassler, 1920
- Cribrilina vinei Gregory, 1893
- Cribrilina watersi Andersson, 1902
