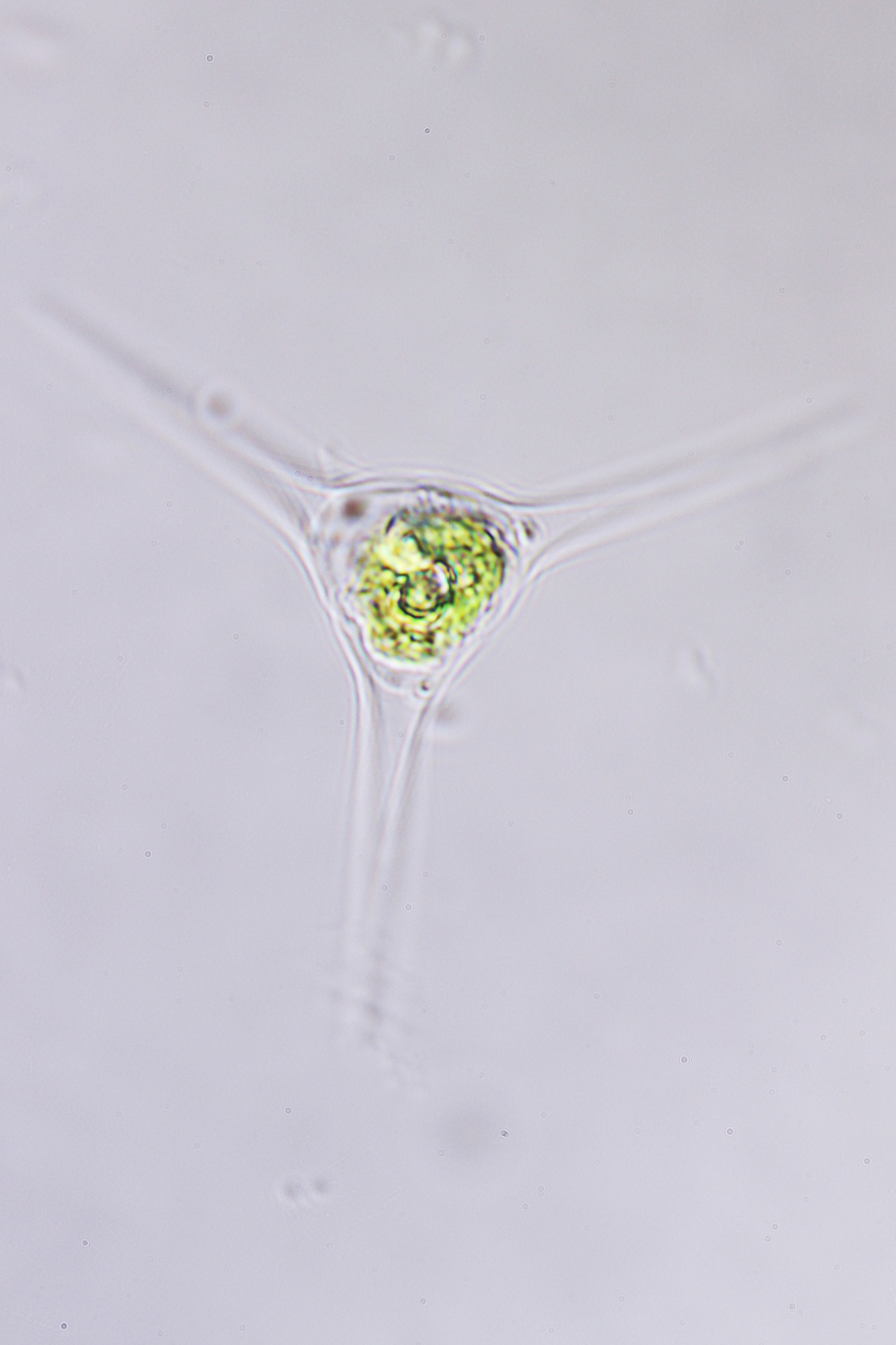
- Treubaria triappendiculata

Scientific classification
- Kingdom: Plantae
- Division: Chlorophyta
- Class: Chlorophyceae
- Order: Sphaeropleales
- Family: Treubariaceae (Korshikov) Fott
- Genus: Treubaria; C.Bernard

Type species
- Treubaria triappendiculata C.Bernard

Species
- See text

= Treubaria =

Genus of algae

Treubaria is a genus of microscopic green algae, the sole genus in the family Treubariaceae. Treubaria is found in freshwater habitats and has a cosmopolitan distribution.

The genus was circumscribed by Charles Jean Bernard in Protococ. Desmid. Eau Douce 5–6, 12, 169 in 1908.

The genus name of Treubaria is in honour of Melchior Treub (1851–1910), who was a Dutch botanist. He worked at the Bogor Botanical Gardens in Buitenzorg on the island of Java, south of Batavia, Dutch East Indies, gaining renown for his work on tropical flora.

== Description ==
Treubaria consists of single cells that are planktonic. The protoplast is 5–22 μm in diameter, spherical to multi-lobed, with 3–4 (sometimes up to 20) hollow, conical or tubular spines (up to 83 μm long) radiating from the cells. Cells are uninucleate when young, but have up to four or five nuclei when mature. They have one chloroplast when young; chloroplasts have one (or multiple) pyrenoids.

Treubaria reproduces asexually; sexual reproduction has not been observed in Treubaria. Asexual reproduction typically occurs through the formation of autospores; four autospores are produced per cell. One species is known to produce zoospsores. Two, four, or eight zoospores are produced per cell, each with four flagella.

== Classification ==
The classification of Treubaria is currently unclear. Currently, the taxonomy of green algae is in flux because morphological characteristics do not align with phylogenetic relationships. Phylogenetically, Treubaria forms a close relationship with Cylindrocapsa, Elakatothrix, and Trochiscia. All four genera share ultrastructural features such as pyrenoids where the matrix is penetrated by cytoplasmic invaginations, and Cylindrocapsa produces quadriflagellate zoospores. However, the genera share litle else in common, making a coherent classification difficult.

== Species ==
As accepted by WoRMS;

- Treubaria crassicornuta Z.-Y.Hu, 1994
- Treubaria crassispina G.M.Smith, 1926
- Treubaria planctonica (G.M.Smith) Korshikov, 1953
- Treubaria quadrispina (G.M.Smith) Fott & Kovácik, 1975
- Treubaria schmidlei (Schröder) Fott & Kovácik, 1975
- Treubaria setigera (W.Archer) G.M.Smith, 1933
- Treubaria triappendiculata C.Bernard, 1908
- Treubaria umbrina (G.M.Smith) Fott & Kováčik, 1975

Former species;

- T. euryacantha (Schmidle) Korshikov, 1953 accepted as Treubaria triappendiculata
- T. limnetica (G.M.Smith) Fott & Kovácik, 1975 accepted as Treubaria schmidlei
- T. varia Tiffany & Ahlstrom, 1931 accepted as Treubaria schmidlei

Species of Treubaria are identified based on morphological characteristics such as the shape of the protoplast and the shape and number of spines. However, all species are very polymorphic and require further revisions.
