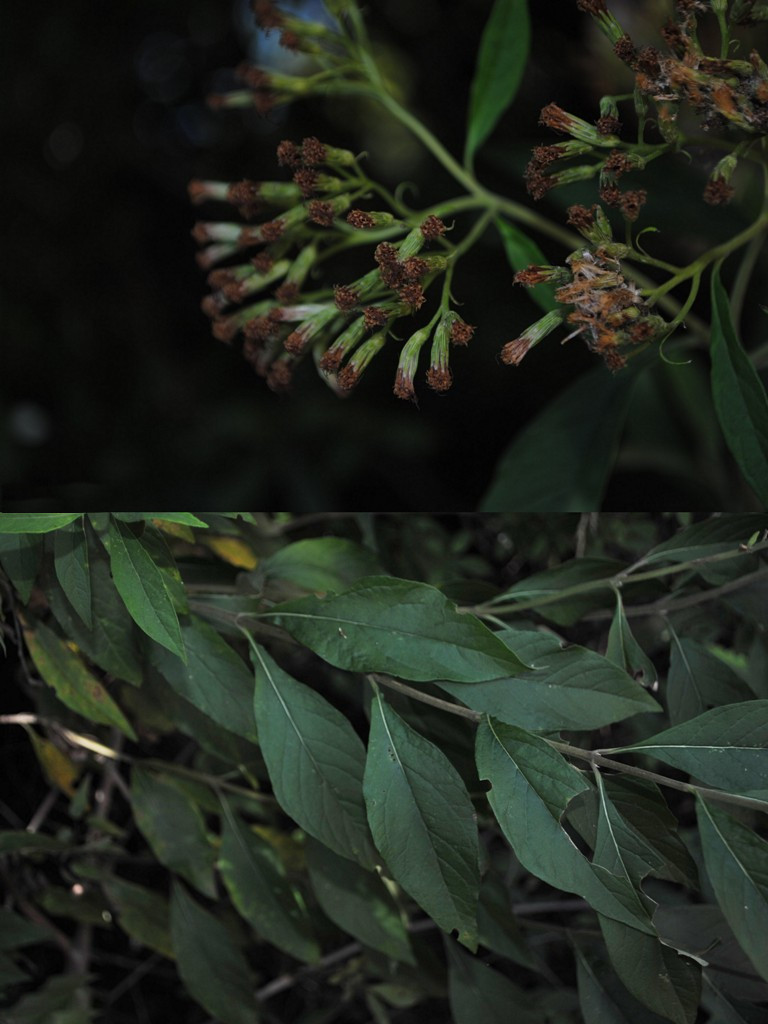
- Malmeanthus subintegerrimus

Scientific classification
- Kingdom: Plantae
- Clade: Embryophytes
- Clade: Tracheophytes
- Clade: Angiosperms
- Clade: Eudicots
- Clade: Asterids
- Order: Asterales
- Family: Asteraceae
- Subfamily: Asteroideae
- Tribe: Eupatorieae
- Genus: Malmeanthus; R.M.King & H.Rob.

Type species
- Eupatorium subintegerrimum Malme

= Malmeanthus =

Genus of flowering plants

Malmeanthus is a genus of South American flowering plants in the tribe Eupatorieae within the family Asteraceae.

Species

- Malmeanthus catharinensis R.M.King & H.Rob. - Santa Catarina
- Malmeanthus hilarii (B.L.Rob.) R.M.King & H.Rob. - Minas Gerais
- Malmeanthus subintegerrimus (Malme) R.M.King & H.Rob. - Rio Grande do Sul, Santa Catarina, Uruguay
