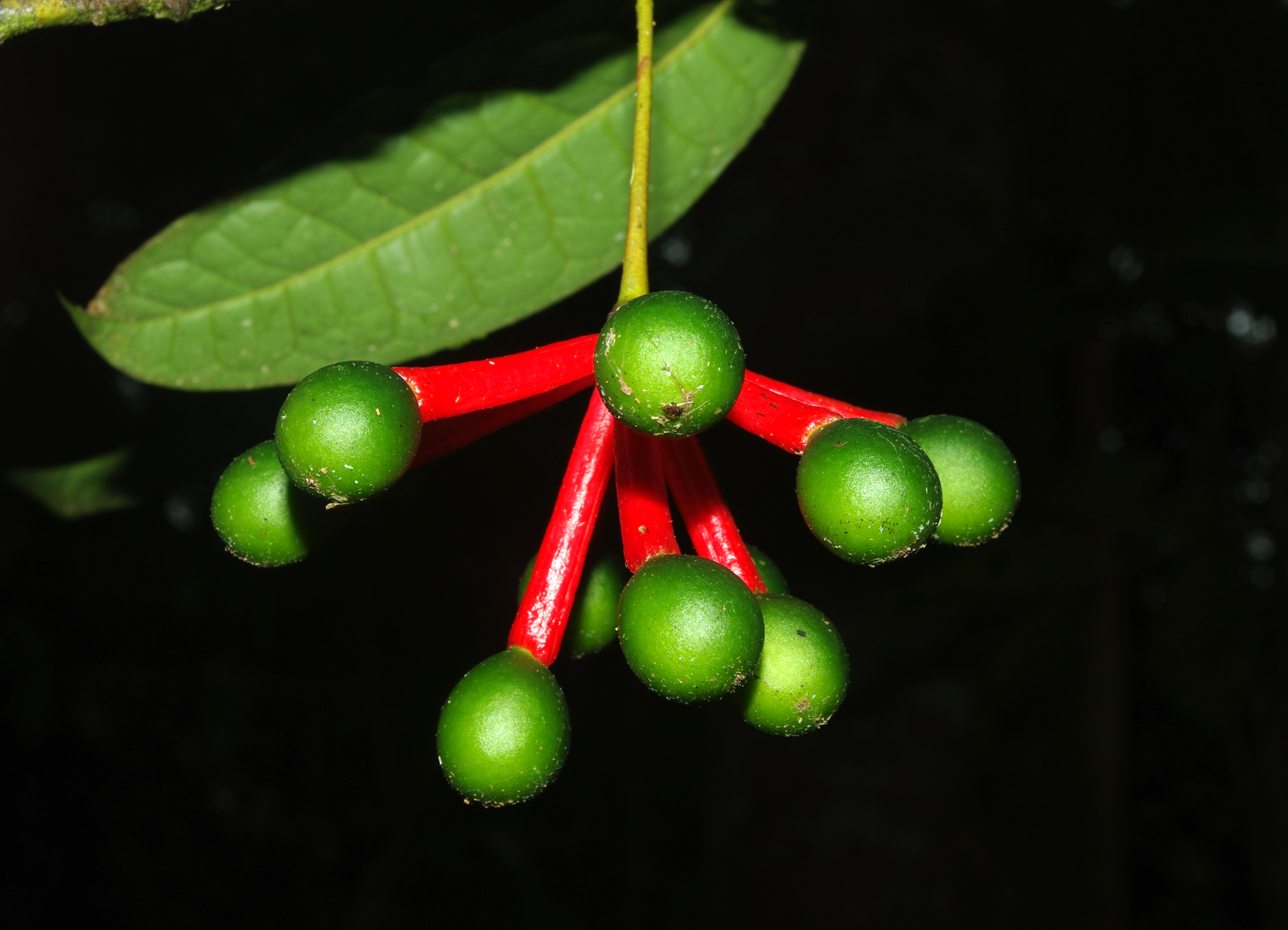
- Malmea manausensis

Scientific classification
- Kingdom: Plantae
- Clade: Tracheophytes
- Clade: Angiosperms
- Clade: Magnoliids
- Order: Magnoliales
- Family: Annonaceae
- Subfamily: Malmeoideae
- Tribe: Malmeeae
- Genus: Malmea; R.E.Fr.

Type species
- Malmea obovata R.E.Fr.

= Malmea =

Genus of flowering plants

Malmea is a genus of plants in the custard apple family Annonaceae native to tropical America.

== Species ==
As of January 2025, Plants of the World Online accepts the following 6 species:

- Malmea dielsiana R.E.Fr.
- Malmea dimera Chatrou
- Malmea guianensis R.E.Fr.
- Malmea manausensis Maas & Miralha
- Malmea obovata R.E.Fr.
- Malmea surinamensis Chatrou
