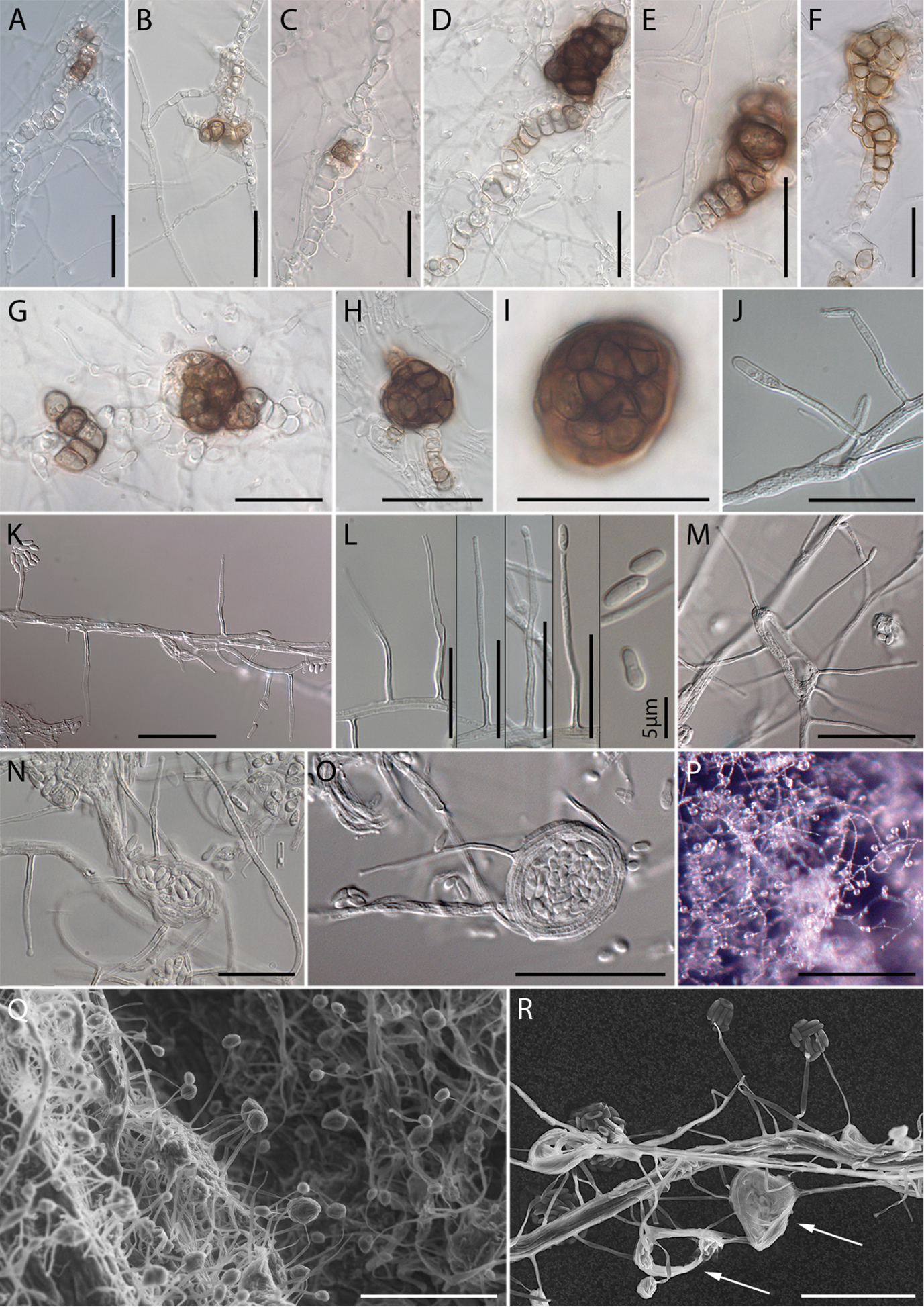
- Monocillium gamsii (anamorph of N. gamsii)

Scientific classification
- Kingdom: Fungi
- Division: Ascomycota
- Class: Sordariomycetes
- Order: Hypocreales
- Family: Niessliaceae
- Genus: Niesslia; Auersw. (1869)

Type species
- Niesslia chaetomium (Ces. & De Not.) Auersw. (1869)

Synonyms
- Collarina A.Giraldo, Gené & Guarro (2014); Hyaloseta A.W.Ramaley (2001); Lohwagiella Petr. (1970); Monocillium S.B.Saksena (1955); Nitschkia Nitschke ex Fuckel (1870); Nitschkiopsis Nannf. & R.Sant. (1975)

= Niesslia =

Genus of fungi

Niesslia is a genus of fungi in the family Niessliaceae. It was circumscribed by German mycologist Bernhard Auerswald in 1869, with Niesslia chaetomium assigned as the type species.

These organisms, which are barely visible to the naked eye, are found in decaying plant matter and are parasites of lichens, other fungi, or nematode eggs. They belong to the ascomycetes and in their teleomorphic (sexual) stage they form distinctive dark brown shiny fruiting bodies with spines. The fruiting body structures are a flask-shaped type called perithecia where the spores escape through ostioles. The asexual anamorphic stage was given the genus name Monocillium, now considered a synonym.

== Description ==
Niesslia is a genus of small, dark-coloured fungi that typically grow on decaying plant material. These fungi produce distinctive reproductive structures called perithecia, which are visible to the naked eye as tiny, dark spots on the plant surface. The perithecia of Niesslia species are key to their identification and exhibit several distinctive characteristics. These tiny, dark reproductive structures are usually round when fresh, but often collapse into a cup-like shape as they dry out. Their outer wall is brittle and typically displays a shiny, blackish-brown colour that catches the eye. A striking feature is the upper part of the perithecium, which is adorned with stiff, dark brown bristles or spines. These spines can vary in complexity, sometimes consisting of just a single cell, while in other cases they are made up of several cells. Occasionally, these spines end in a small, swollen tip known as a vesicle, adding to their unique appearance. Inside the perithecium, Niesslia deviates from some other fungi by lacking paraphyses. Instead, the interior houses specialised cells called asci, which are responsible for producing and containing the fungal spores.

The asci in Niesslia are very thin-walled and can be either cylindrical or club-shaped (clavate). They often narrow at the top and have a flat end. The ascospores produced within these asci are colourless and typically have two cells. They can be elliptical, cylindrical, or slightly spindle-shaped.

Niesslia also has an asexual reproductive stage, known as an anamorph. In this stage, the fungus produces structures called phialides, which are specialised cells that generate asexual spores (conidia). The phialides in Niesslia have a distinctive shape, often with a thickened wall in the lower part and a narrow, thin-walled neck at the top where spores are produced. These asexual spores are typically formed in chains or in slimy clusters.

A unique feature of Niesslia is the presence of characteristic crystals in laboratory cultures. These crystals can have various shapes, including prism-like structures with indented ends, bundle-like formations with ragged ends, or fan-shaped structures.

== Species ==
As of September 2021, Species Fungorum accepts 98 species of Niesslia. Many species were formally described as new to science in 2019 after a phylogenetic framework for the genus was proposed based on molecular phylogenetic analysis.

- Niesslia aemula Syd. (1940)
- Niesslia aeruginosa W.Gams & Stielow (2019)
- Niesslia agavacearum A.W.Ramaley (2001)
- Niesslia albosubiculosa W.Gams, Gräfenhan & Schroers (2019)
- Niesslia allantoidea W.Gams (2018)
- Niesslia ammophilae W.Gams & Aplin (2018)
- Niesslia anacardii Sathe & K.M.Mogarkar (1975)
- Niesslia andicola (Speg.) W.Gams (2019)
- Niesslia antarctica (Speg.) W.Gams (2019)
- Niesslia arctiicola (W.Gams) W.Gams (2019)
- Niesslia artocarpi W.Gams (2018)
- Niesslia aterrima W.Gams & Stielow (2019)
- Niesslia aurantiaca (A.Giraldo, Gene & Guarro) Giraldo & Schroers (2019)
- Niesslia bellotae (Speg.) W.Gams (2019)
- Niesslia brevis W.Gams & Stielow (2019)
- Niesslia bulbillosa (W.Gams) W.Gams (2019)
- Niesslia catenata W.Gams & Stielow (2019)
- Niesslia cinctiostiolata Whitton, K.D.Hyde & McKenzie (2012)
- Niesslia cladii W.Gams & Stielow (2018)
- Niesslia cladoniicola D.Hawksw. & W.Gams (1975)
- Niesslia clarkii W.Gams (2018)
- Niesslia coenogonii van den Boom (2017)
- Niesslia constricta (W.Gams) W.Gams & Stielow (2019)
- Niesslia curvisetosa (W.Gams & Turhan) W.Gams & Stielow (2019)
- Niesslia dimorphospora (W.Gams) W.Gams & Stielow (2019)
- Niesslia echinoides Etayo, Flakus & Kukwa (2013)
- Niesslia elymi W.Gams (2018)
- Niesslia erysiphoides (Ellis & Everh.) M.E.Barr (1993)
- Niesslia evae Etayo (2017)
- Niesslia exigua (Sacc.) Kirschst. (1939)
- Niesslia exilis (Alb. & Schwein.) G.Winter (1885)
- Niesslia exosporioides (Desm.) G.Winter (1885)
- Niesslia fuegiana (Speg.) W.Gams & Samuels (2019)
- Niesslia fusiformis W.Gams & Samuels (2019)
- Niesslia gamsii (Ashrafi & W.Maier) S.Ashrafi & W.Maier & Schroers (2019)
- Niesslia globospora Etayo (2002)
- Niesslia grisescens W.Gams & Stielow (2019)
- Niesslia hennebertii W.Gams & Stielow (2019)
- Niesslia heterophora W.Gams & M.Nuñez (2019)
- Niesslia horridula (Wallr.) Kirschst. (1939)
- Niesslia ilicifolia (Cooke) G.Winter (1885)
- Niesslia indica (S.B.Saksena) W.Gams & Stielow (2019)
- Niesslia kapitiana Whitton, K.D.Hyde & McKenzie (2012)
- Niesslia keissleri Zhurb. (2017)
- Niesslia kununguakii Alstrup & E.S.Hansen (2001)
- Niesslia lampracantha W.Gams (2019)
- Niesslia lanea (Dearn.) M.E.Barr (1993)
- Niesslia lanuginosa Butin (1975)
- Niesslia leucoula W.Gams & Schroers (2019)
- Niesslia ligustica (Girlanda & Luppi Mosca) W.Gams & Stielow (2019)
- Niesslia lobariae Etayo & Diederich (1996)
- Niesslia loricata (Nicot & W.Gams) W.Gams & Stielow (2019)
- Niesslia luzulae (Westend.) W.Gams (2019)
- Niesslia macrospora (Matsush.) W.Gams (2019)
- Niesslia microspora (Speg.) Sivan. (1977)
- Niesslia minutispora W.Gams, Gräfenhan & Schroers (2019)
- Niesslia monocilliata (Whitton, K.D.Hyde & McKenzie) W.Gams (2019)
- Niesslia mucida (W.Gams) W.Gams & Stielow (2019)
- Niesslia muelleri R.Rao (1966)
- Niesslia nobilis (Sacc.) W.Gams (2019)
- Niesslia nolinae (A.W.Ramaley) W.Gams (2019)
- Niesslia nordinii (Bourch.) W.Gams & Stielow (2019)
- Niesslia pacifica Whitton, K.D.Hyde & McKenzie (2012)
- Niesslia palmicola K.D.Hyde, Goh, Joanne E.Taylor & J.Fröhl. (1999)
- Niesslia pandani W.Gams & Stielow (2019)
- Niesslia pandanicola Dulym., P.F.Cannon, K.D.Hyde & Peerally (2001)
- Niesslia peltigerae Pérez-Ort. (2020)
- Niesslia peltigericola (D.Hawksw.) Etayo (2008)
- Niesslia petrakii W.Gams (2019)
- Niesslia philippinensis Whitton, K.D.Hyde & McKenzie (2012)
- Niesslia physacantha W.Gams & Stielow (2019)
- Niesslia pseudocyphellariae Etayo & Diederich (2000)
- Niesslia pulchriseta (Peck) M.E.Barr (1986)
- Niesslia puyae (Speg.) W.Gams (2019)
- Niesslia rhizomorpharum W.Gams & Stielow (2019)
- Niesslia robusta Tretiach (2002)
- Niesslia rollhansenii W.Gams & Stielow (2019)
- Niesslia sabalicola (Ellis & Everh.) W.Gams (2019)
- Niesslia schizospora Etayo (2002)
- Niesslia secedens (Tassi) W.Gams (2019)
- Niesslia spegazziniana (Cooke) W.Gams (2019)
- Niesslia sphaeropedunculata W.Gams & Stielow (2019)
- Niesslia stellenboschiana Crous (2019)
- Niesslia stictarum (Nannf. & R.Sant.) R.Sant. & Tretiach (2002)
- Niesslia striatispora W.Gams (2019)
- Niesslia subiculosa Syd. (1940)
- Niesslia subiculosella W.Gams & Samuels (2019)
- Niesslia sukauensis Matsush. (2003)
- Niesslia sydowii W.Gams (2019)
- Niesslia tatjanae (S.Y.Kondr.) Etayo (2008)
- Niesslia tenuis (W.Gams) W.Gams (2019)
- Niesslia tenuissima W.Gams & Stielow (2019)
- Niesslia tetrahedrospora Etayo (2002)
- Niesslia tiroliensis (Kirschst.) Zhilina (1963)
- Niesslia typhae W.Gams, P.Thompson & Stielow (2019)
- Niesslia vaginata Whitton, K.D.Hyde & McKenzie (2012)
- Niesslia waitemataensis W.Gams, Samuels, Gräfenhan & Schroers (2019)
- Niesslia xanthorrhoeae W.Gams (2019)
- Niesslia yaganae Etayo (2008)
