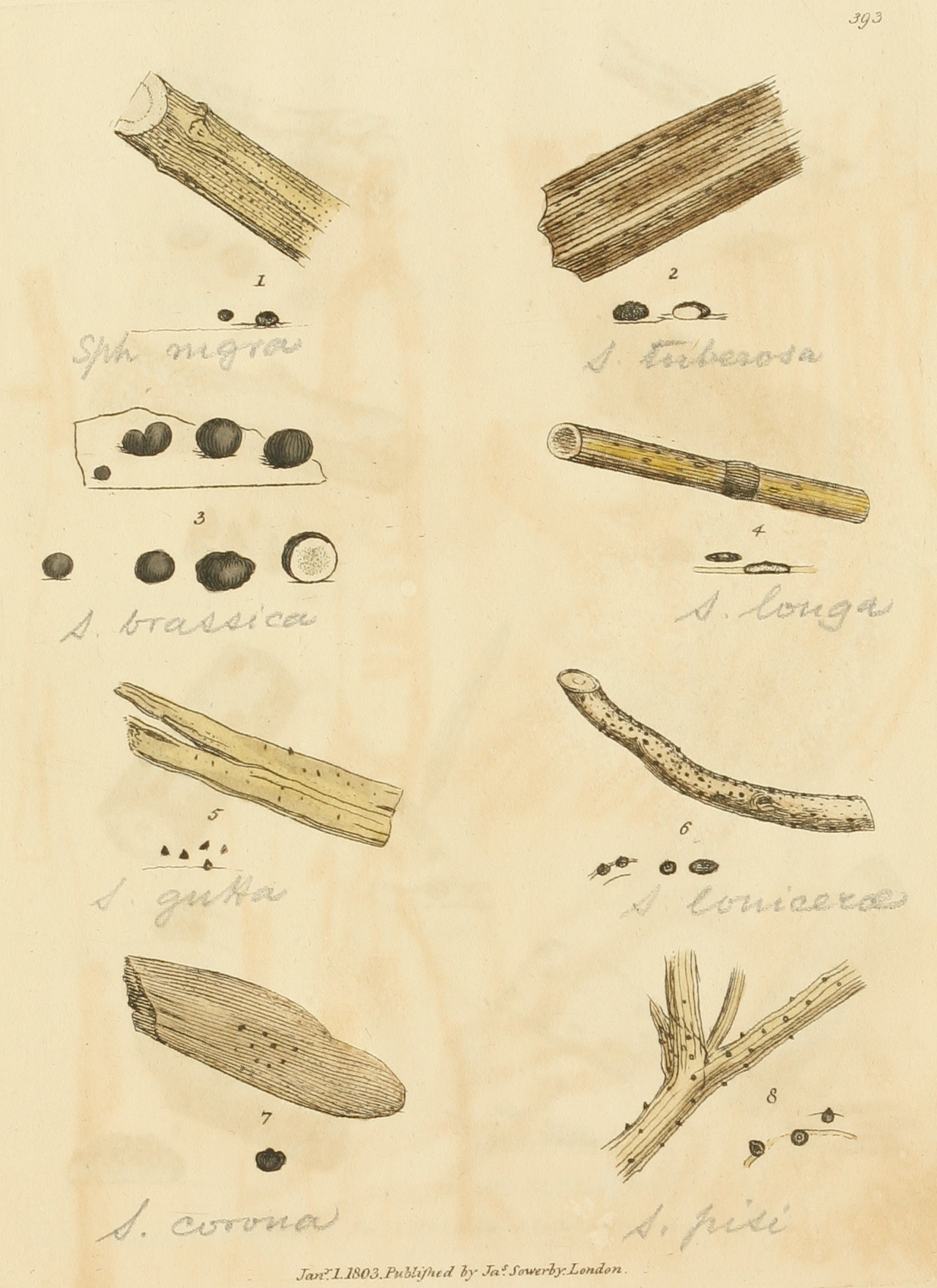

Scientific classification
- Kingdom: Fungi
- Division: Ascomycota
- Class: Sordariomycetes
- Order: Hypocreales
- Family: Niessliaceae; Kirschst., 1939

Type genus
- Niesslia Auersw., 1869

= Niessliaceae =

Family of fungi

The Niessliaceae are a family of fungi in the phylum Ascomycota, class Sordariomycetes. The family was updated in 2020.

== Genera ==
As accepted by Wijayawardene et al. 2020; (with amount of species)

- Atronectria Etayo (2)
- Circinoniesslia Samuels & M.E. Barr (1)
- Cryptoniesslia Scheuer (1)
- Eucasphaeria Crous (2)
- Malmeomyces Starb. (1)
- Melchioria Penz. & Sacc. (6)
- Miyakeomyces Hara (1)
- Myrmaeciella Lindau (2)
- Myrtacremonium Crous (1)
- Neoeucasphaeria Crous (1)
- Niesslia Auersw. (43)
- Nitschkiopsis Nannf. & R. Sant. (1)
- Paraniesslia K.M. Tsui, K.D. Hyde & Hodgkiss (2)
- Pseudohyaloseta Tibpromma & K.D. Hyde (1)
- Pseudonectriella Petr. (1)
- Pseudorhynchia Höhn. (2)
- Rosasphaeria Jaklitsch & Voglmayr (1)
- Taiwanascus Sivan & H.S. Chang (2)
- Trichosphaerella E. Bommer, M. Rousseau & Sacc. (4)
- Valetoniella Höhn. (3)
- Valetoniellopsis Samuels & M.E. Barr (1)
