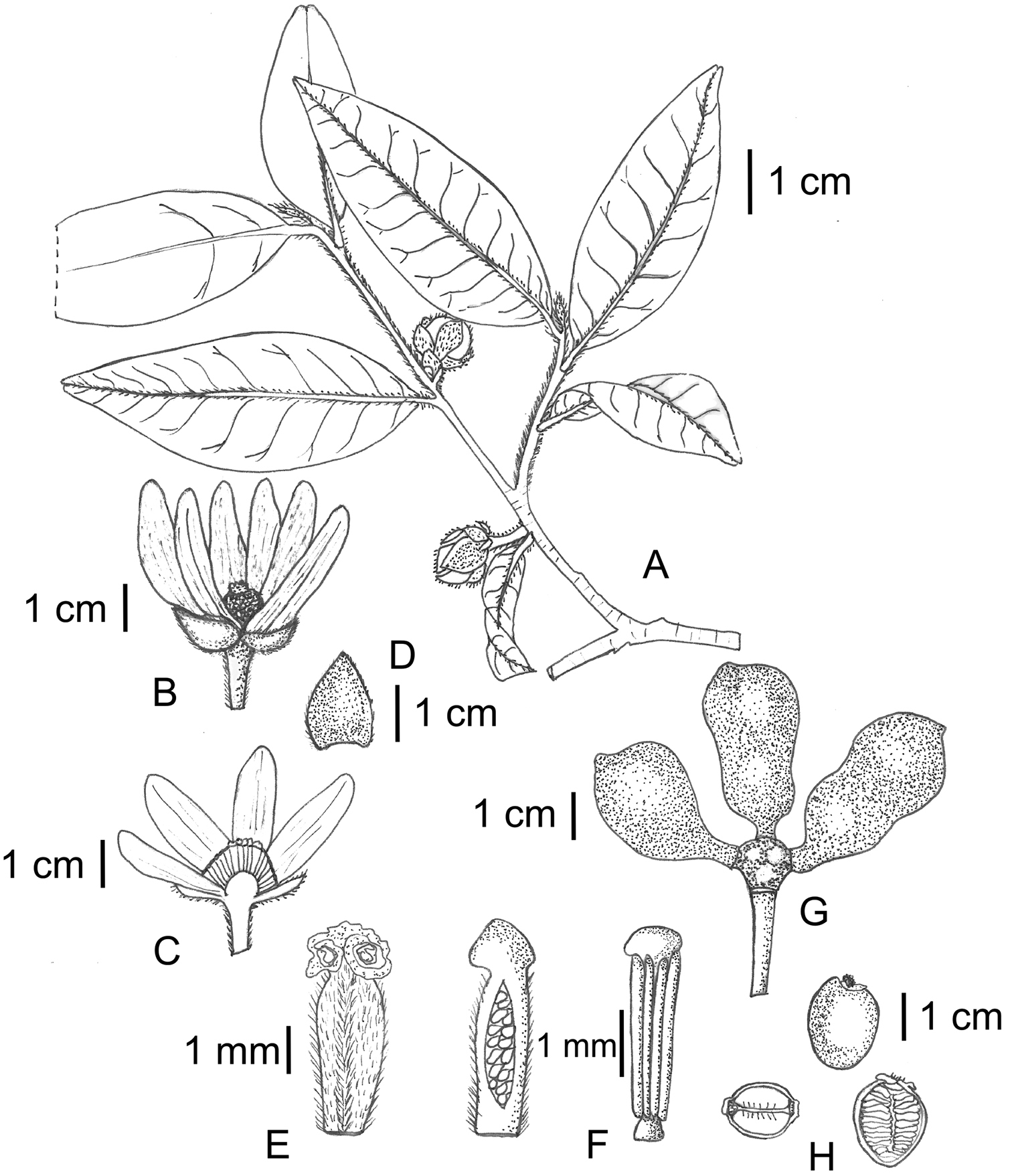
- Scientific illustration of Uvariastrum hexaloboides

Conservation status
- Least Concern (IUCN 3.1)

Scientific classification
- Kingdom: Plantae
- Clade: Embryophytes
- Clade: Tracheophytes
- Clade: Spermatophytes
- Clade: Angiosperms
- Clade: Magnoliids
- Order: Magnoliales
- Family: Annonaceae
- Genus: Uvariastrum
- Species: U. hexaloboides

Binomial name
- Uvariastrum hexaloboides (R.E.Fr.) R.E.Fr. ex N.Robson

Synonyms
- Uvaria hexaloboides R.E.Fr.

= Uvariastrum hexaloboides =

Species of flowering plant

Uvariastrum hexaloboides is a species of plant in the Annonaceae family. It is native to Tanzania, Zambia and Zaire. Robert Elias Fries, the botanist who first formally described the species using the basionym Uvaria hexaloboides, named it after a different species Hexalobus monopetalus which he thought its flowers and vegetative parts resembled.

== Description ==
It is a tree reaching 15 meters in height. The young, brown branches are densely hairy, but become hairless and dark brown with maturity. Its narrowly elliptical to egg-shaped, leathery leaves are 6–13 by 2.4–5 centimeters. The leaves have wedge-shaped to rounded bases and tapering tips, with the tapering portion 1–2 centimeters long. The tips of the leaves have a shallow notch. The leaves are hairless on their dark green upper surface and sparsely hairy on their lighter green lower surfaces. The leaves have 9–14 pairs of secondary veins emanating from their midribs. Its petioles are 0.1–0.3 millimeters long, and covered in dense red-brown hairs, with a broad groove on their upper side. Its solitary or paired Inflorescences occur on branches and sometimes the trunk. Each inflorescence has 1 flower. Each flower is on a densely hairy pedicel that is 0.5–6 by 1–2 millimeters. The pedicels have 1–2 oval, basal bracts that are 2–7 by 3–6 millimeters and densely hairy. Its flowers have 3 oval sepals that are 0.9–1.5 by 0.7 by 1.8 centimeters. The sepals are densely hairy on both surfaces, and hairier at their margins which are slightly folded. Its 6 petals are arranged in two rows of 3. The yellow to green-yellow, elliptical, outer petals are 2–3.5 by 1-1.4 centimeters with densely hairy upper and lower surfaces. The yellow to green-yellow, oval inner petals are 1–2.5 by 0.8–1.5 centimeters with densely hairy upper and lower surfaces. The flowers have numerous stamens that are 3 by 0.5 millimeters. The flowers have up to 10–14 carpels that are 3 millimeters long, and densely hairy. The carpels have bilobed stigma. The fruit occur in clusters of 1–5 on sparsely hairy pedicles that are 0.5–2 by 2–5 centimeters. The red, hairless, oblong fruit are 2.5–6 by 2-2.5 centimeters. Each fruit has up to 6–10 dark brown, elliptical seeds that are 15–20 by 8–12 by 6–8 millimeters.

=== Reproductive biology ===
The pollen of Uvariastrum hexaloboides is shed as permanent tetrads.

=== Distribution and habitat ===
It has been observed growing rocky or red sandy loam soil in woodlands at elevations between 1000 and 1600 meters.

== Uses ==
It has been described as being used as a source of edible fruit in Zambia.
