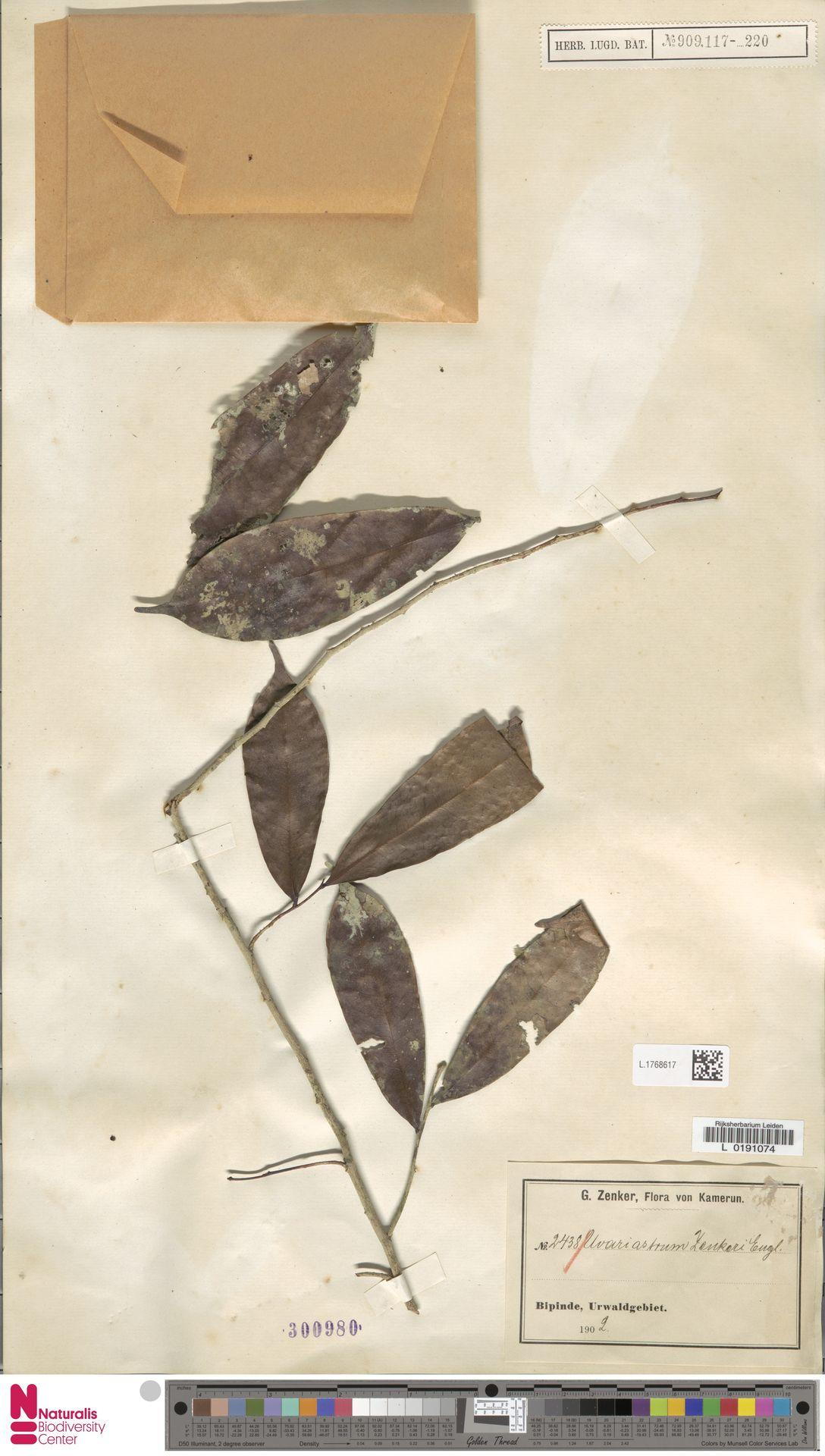
- Uvariastrum zenkeri

Scientific classification
- Kingdom: Plantae
- Clade: Tracheophytes
- Clade: Angiosperms
- Clade: Magnoliids
- Order: Magnoliales
- Family: Annonaceae
- Tribe: Monodoreae
- Genus: Uvariastrum; Engl. & Diels

= Uvariastrum =

Genus of flowering plants

Uvariastrum is a genus of plants in the Annonaceae endemic to sub-Saharan Africa. One species of the genus grows in a drier woodland habitat, whereas the other species are found in the tropical lowland rain forests.

As of January 2025, Plants of the World Online accepts the following 5 species:

- Uvariastrum germainii Boutique
- Uvariastrum hexaloboides (R.E.Fr.) R.E.Fr. ex N.Robson
- Uvariastrum insculptum (Engl. & Diels) Sprague & Hutch.
- Uvariastrum pierreanum Engl.
- Uvariastrum zenkeri Engl. & Diels
