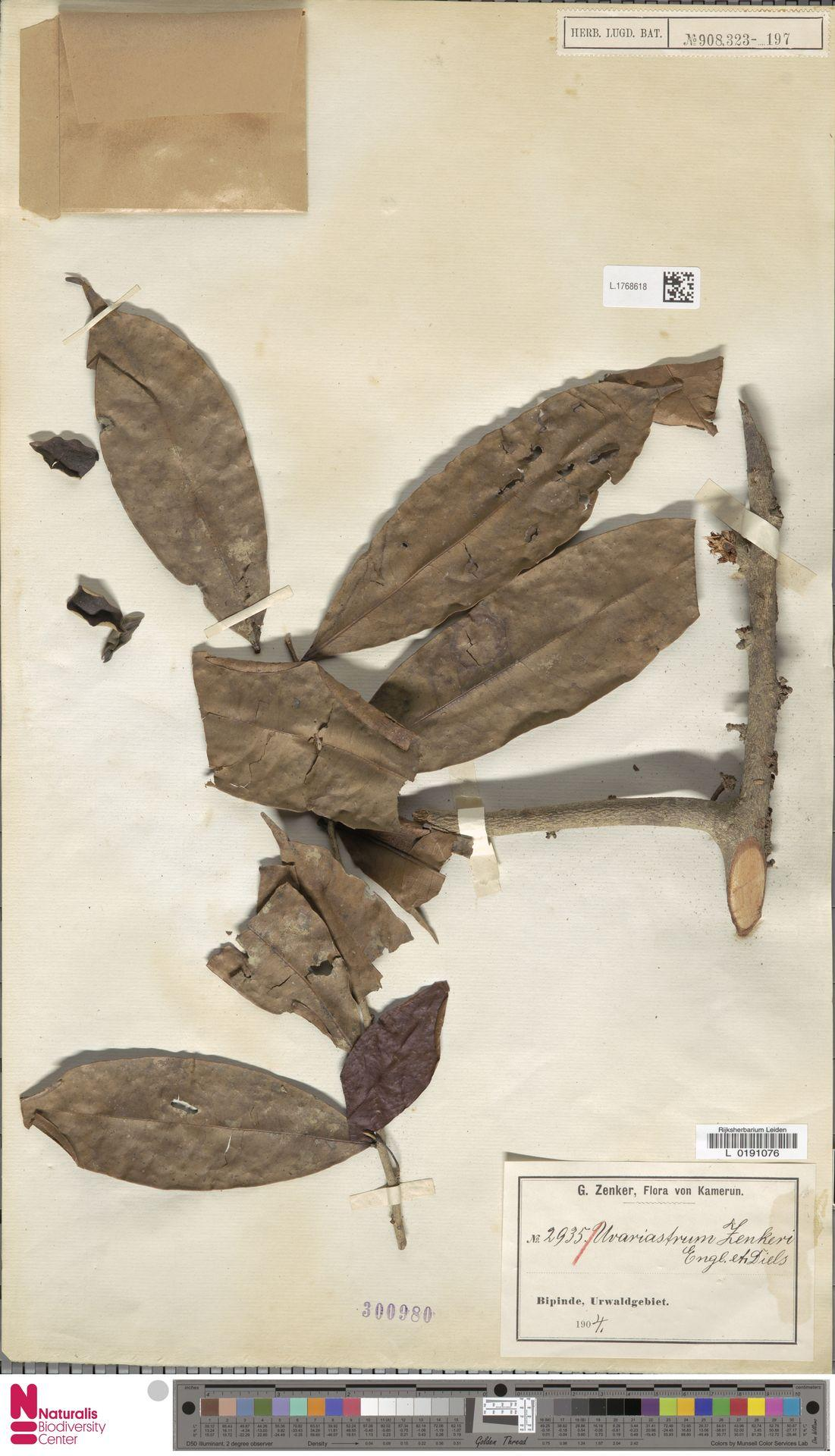
- Naturalis Biodiversity Center - L.1768618 - Uvariastrum zenkeri Engl. and Diels - Annonaceae - Plant type specimen.

Conservation status
- Least Concern (IUCN 3.1)

Scientific classification
- Kingdom: Plantae
- Clade: Embryophytes
- Clade: Tracheophytes
- Clade: Spermatophytes
- Clade: Angiosperms
- Clade: Magnoliids
- Order: Magnoliales
- Family: Annonaceae
- Genus: Uvariastrum
- Species: U. zenkeri

Binomial name
- Uvariastrum zenkeri Engl. & Diels

Synonyms
- Uvariastrum pynaertii De Wild.; Uvariastrum zenkeri var. nigritanum Baker f.

= Uvariastrum zenkeri =

Species of flowering plant

Uvariastrum zenkeri is a species of plant in the Annonaceae family. It is native to west-central tropical Africa, ranging from southeastern Nigeria to Cameroon, Gabon, Republic of the Congo, and Democratic Republic of the Congo. It is threatened by habitat loss.
