= Hexalobus salicifolius =

Conservation status
- Least Concern (IUCN 3.1)

Scientific classification
- Kingdom: Plantae
- Clade: Embryophytes
- Clade: Tracheophytes
- Clade: Spermatophytes
- Clade: Angiosperms
- Clade: Magnoliids
- Order: Magnoliales
- Family: Annonaceae
- Genus: Hexalobus
- Species: H. salicifolius

Binomial name
- Hexalobus salicifolius Engl.

Species of flowering plant

Hexalobus salicifolius is a species of flowering plant in the family Annonaceae. It is found in Cameroon, Ivory Coast, Gabon, and the Republic of the Congo. Local common names include oouè, owoé, and owui.

This is an evergreen tree up to 35 meters tall. The deeply furrowed, fissured trunk is up to one meter wide. The leaves are up to 10 centimeters long by 3.5 wide. They may be grayish in color and hairy in texture. The fragrant flowers have cream to yellow petals with purple bases. The fruit is edible. Its pollen is shed as permanent tetrads.
