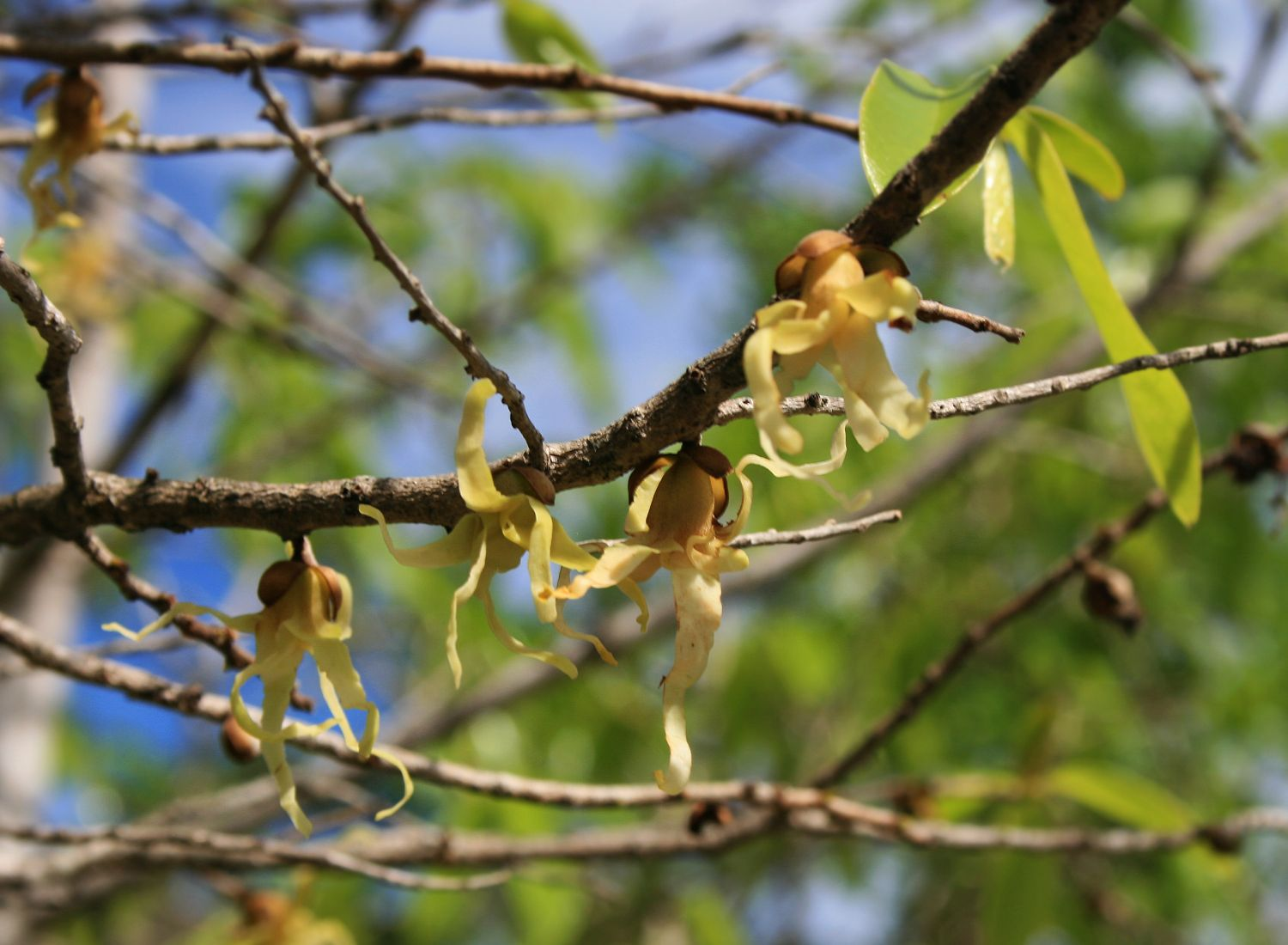
- Hexalobus monopetalus

Scientific classification
- Kingdom: Plantae
- Clade: Embryophytes
- Clade: Tracheophytes
- Clade: Spermatophytes
- Clade: Angiosperms
- Clade: Magnoliids
- Order: Magnoliales
- Family: Annonaceae
- Subfamily: Annonoideae
- Tribe: Monodoreae
- Genus: Hexalobus; A.DC.

= Hexalobus =

Genus of flowering plants

Hexalobus is a genus of flowering plants in the family Annonaceae. There are five species native to tropical Africa.

These are shrubs to large trees up to 40 metres (130 ft) tall. They grow in several types of tropical habitat.

Most species have fragrant flowers. The petals are fused at the bases, making the flowers somewhat tubular. The petals are wrinkly in texture and cream to yellow in color, sometimes with darker rims.

== Species ==
Five species are accepted.

- Hexalobus bussei Diels
- Hexalobus crispiflorus A.Rich.
- Hexalobus monopetalus (A.Rich.) Engl. & Diels
- Hexalobus mossambicensis N.Robson
- Hexalobus salicifolius Engl.
