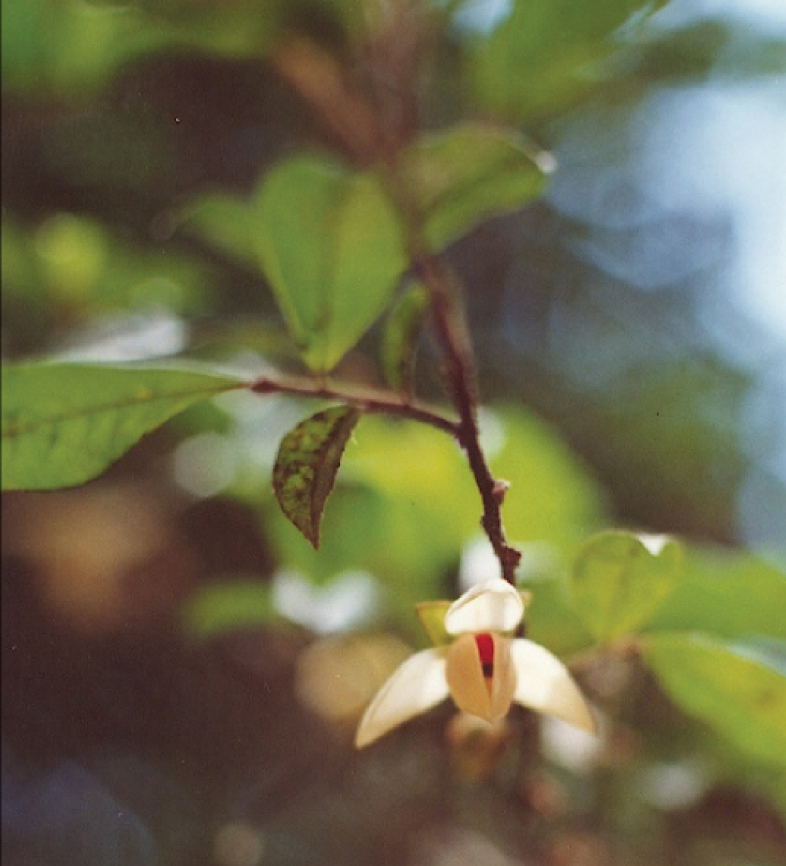
- Color photograph of Uvariastrum insculptum

Conservation status
- Least Concern (IUCN 3.1)

Scientific classification
- Kingdom: Plantae
- Clade: Embryophytes
- Clade: Tracheophytes
- Clade: Spermatophytes
- Clade: Angiosperms
- Clade: Magnoliids
- Order: Magnoliales
- Family: Annonaceae
- Genus: Uvariastrum
- Species: U. insculptum

Binomial name
- Uvariastrum insculptum (Engl. & Diels) Sprague & Hutch.

Synonyms
- Uva insculpta (Engl. & Diels) Kuntze; Uvaria insculpta Engl. & Diels

= Uvariastrum insculptum =

Species of flowering plant

Uvariastrum insculptum is a species of plant in the Annonaceae. It is native to Cameroon, Gabon, Ghana, Ivory Coast, Liberia, Nigeria, and the Republic of the Congo. Adolf Engler and Ludwig Diels, the botanists who first formally described the species using the basionym Uvaria insculpta, named it after the secondary veins on its leaves which are distinctly sunken (insculptus in Latin).

== Description ==
Uvariastrum insculptum is a shrub or tree reaching 4–15 meters in height. The young, brown branches are hairy, but become hairless and brown-grey with maturity. Its narrowly elliptical to egg-shaped, papery to slightly leathery leaves are 6–14 by 2–4 centimeters. The leaves have rounded to slightly heart-shaped bases and tapering tips, with the tapering portion 1–2 centimeters long. The leaves are hairless to very sparsely hairy on their dark green upper and lower surfaces. The leaves have 8–12 pairs of secondary veins emanating from their midribs. The secondary veins connect toward the margins of the leaves and are distinctly recessed. Its petioles are 1–4 by 1 millimeters, and covered in dense red-brown hairs, with an indistinct groove on their upper side.

Uvariastrum insculptum has solitary or paired Inflorescences occurring on branches and sometimes the trunk. Each inflorescence has 1 flower. Each flower is on a densely hairy pedicel that is 0.8–1.5 by 1–2 millimeters. The pedicels have 1–3 densely hairy basal bracts that are 4 by 3–4 millimeters. Its flowers have 3 oval sepals that are 0.7–1.5 by 5–8 millimeters. The bases of the sepals are flat, and their tips are pointed. The sepals are densely hairy on both surfaces. The sepals are light green to pale yellow and darker at their margins which are slightly folded. Its 6 petals are arranged in two rows of 3. The white to pale yellow to light brown, oval, outer petals are 2.3-3.5 by 0.5–1 centimeters. The upper surface of the outer petals is densely covered in downy to woolly hairs, and the lower surfaces are sparsely covered in downy to woolly hairs. The white to pale yellow to light brown, oval inner petals are 1–2 by 0.6–1 centimeters with densely hairy upper and lower surfaces. The inner petals are narrower at the base and pointed at the tips. The flowers have numerous bright red densely hairy stamens that are 2-2.5 by 0.5 millimeters. The flowers have up to 6–7 carpels that are 2–3 by 1 millimeters, and densely hairy. The carpels have bilobed stigma that are 1.5 millimeters in diameter, hairless and yellow. Each carpel has up to 19–26 ovules arranged in two rows.

The fruit occur in clusters of 2–8 on sparsely to densely hairy pedicles that are 10–20 by 2–5 millimeters. The densely hairy, oblong fruit are 3–6 by 1–2 centimeters and are sometimes bent. The surface of the fruit is ribbed in network pattern. Each fruit has up to 20 dark brown, flat, elliptical seeds that are 10–15 by 7–9 by 3–5 millimeters.

=== Reproductive biology ===
The pollen of Uvariastrum insculptum is shed as permanent tetrads.

=== Distribution and habitat ===
It has been observed growing lowland primary and secondary rain forests at altitudes up to 400 meters.
