= Hexalobus mossambicensis =

Conservation status
- Vulnerable (IUCN 3.1)

Scientific classification
- Kingdom: Plantae
- Clade: Embryophytes
- Clade: Tracheophytes
- Clade: Spermatophytes
- Clade: Angiosperms
- Clade: Magnoliids
- Order: Magnoliales
- Family: Annonaceae
- Genus: Hexalobus
- Species: H. mossambicensis

Binomial name
- Hexalobus mossambicensis N.Robson

Species of flowering plant

Hexalobus mossambicensis is a species of plant in the Annonaceae family. It is endemic to Mozambique.

== Description ==
It is a tree reaching 4 to 5 meters in height. Its petioles are 2-5 millimeters long. Its leaves are 4-7 by 1.6-3.1 centimeters and come to a point at their tip. Its flowers are solitary and axillary. Its sepals are 6-8 millimeters long and pale brown. Its petals are 1.5 centimeters long and cream colored.

=== Reproductive biology ===
The pollen of H. mossambicensis is shed as permanent tetrads.
