= Hexalobus bussei =

Conservation status
- Endangered (IUCN 3.1)

Scientific classification
- Kingdom: Plantae
- Clade: Embryophytes
- Clade: Tracheophytes
- Clade: Spermatophytes
- Clade: Angiosperms
- Clade: Magnoliids
- Order: Magnoliales
- Family: Annonaceae
- Genus: Hexalobus
- Species: H. bussei

Binomial name
- Hexalobus bussei Diels

Synonyms
- Hexalobus megalophyllus Engl. & Diels

Species of plant in the soursop family

Hexalobus bussei is a species of plant in the family Annonaceae. It is endemic to southwestern Cameroon. Ludwig Diels, the German botanist who first formally described the species, named it after another German botanist, Walter Busse, who collected the sample that Diels examined.

== Description ==
It is a tree reaching 20–30 meters (66–98 ft) meters in height. Its trunk has brown to black, smooth bark that peels in flakes. Its young branches have light to dark brown bark and are covered in hairs. Its petioles are 1–7 by 2.5–7 millimeters in diameter and covered in sparse brown hair. Its oblong to oval, leathery leaves are 15.5-36 by 5.5-10.5 centimeters with tapering tips and heart-shaped bases. The glossy, grey hairless upper surfaces of the leaves have a slightly blistered or puckered appearance while the lower surfaces are hairless or covered in sparse brown hairs. The leaves have 12–17 pairs of secondary veins emanating from their midribs at angles of 55°–85°. Its solitary (sometimes 2), fragrant flowers are born pedicels that are 1-1.2 centimeters long. The pedicels have several bracts and are covered in dense rust-colored hairs. Its 3 oval, leathery sepals are 1.6-2 by 1.1-1.4 centimeters and densely covered in silky cream-colored to brown hairs. Its flowers have 6 petals that are fused at the base to form a 6-lobed corolla that is yellow with a purple base. The lance-shaped lobes are 3-5 millimeters long with rounded tips. The corollas are covered with white hairs. Its flowers have numerous oblong stamen that are 6.5-8 by 1.5 millimeters. The connective tissue between the lobes of the anther extends upward to form a broad, oblique, slanting cap. Its flowers have 3–7 densely hairy carpels that are 4.5-5 by 1-1.3 millimeters. Its horizontally positioned stigma are 3-4.6 by 1-4 millimeters. Its orange, ridged, wrinkled, elliptical fruit occur in groups of 2–4, are 5.3-7.8 by 4 centimeters, and sparsely covered in rust-colored hairs. The fruit have 7-16, shiny, orange to brown, flattened, elliptical to oval seeds that are 2.3-2.8 by 1.7-1.9 by 8-10 millimeters.

=== Reproductive biology ===
The pollen of H. bussei is shed as permanent tetrads.

== Habitat and distribution ==
It has been observed growing in tropical lowland rain forests at elevations of 0 to 200 meters (660 ft).
