= Uvariastrum germainii =

Scientific classification
- Kingdom: Plantae
- Clade: Embryophytes
- Clade: Tracheophytes
- Clade: Angiosperms
- Clade: Magnoliids
- Order: Magnoliales
- Family: Annonaceae
- Genus: Uvariastrum
- Species: U. germainii

Binomial name
- Uvariastrum germainii Boutique

Species of flowering plant

Uvariastrum germainii is a tree in the Annonaceae family. It grows in west central Africa.
