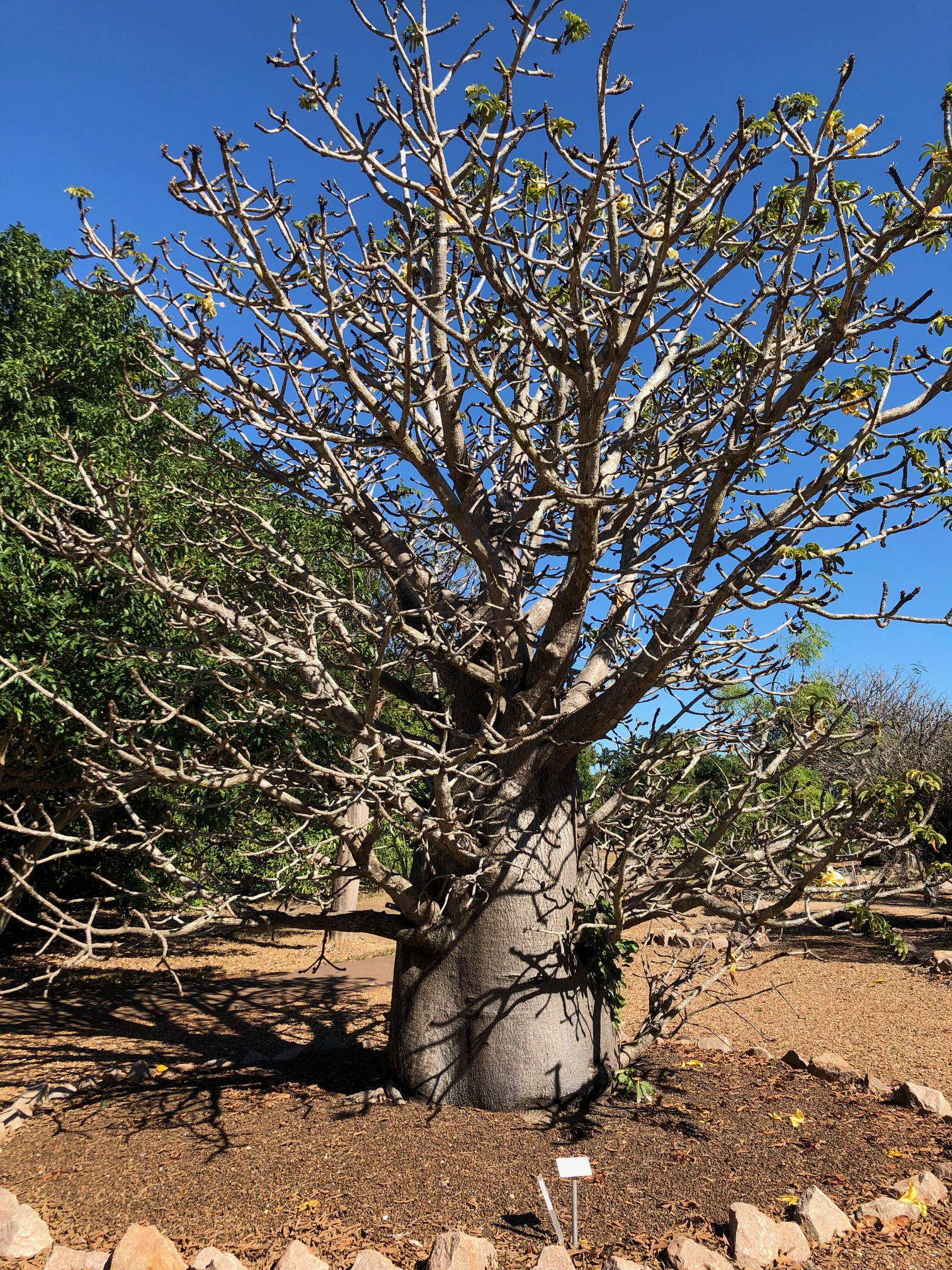
- Adansonia perrieri in Darwin Botanic Gardens

Conservation status
- Critically Endangered (IUCN 3.1)

Scientific classification
- Kingdom: Plantae
- Clade: Tracheophytes
- Clade: Angiosperms
- Clade: Eudicots
- Clade: Rosids
- Order: Malvales
- Family: Malvaceae
- Genus: Adansonia
- Species: A. perrieri

Binomial name
- Adansonia perrieri Capuron

= Adansonia perrieri =

Species of flowering plant

Adansonia perrieri, or Perrier's baobab, is a critically endangered species of deciduous tree, in the genus Adansonia. This species is endemic to northern Madagascar. It has been documented in only 10 locations, including the Ankarana, Ampasindava, Loky Manambato and Montagne d'Ambre protected areas. Most populations, however, are outside of protected areas. Each location has few individuals (the largest subpopulation has 43 trees). With an estimated population of fewer than 250 mature individuals and ongoing habitat decline due to fire and cutting for charcoal and timber or clearing for mining, this species has been assessed by IUCN as Critically Endangered. There are three species of baobab found in northern Madagascar, all sharing the common name "bozy".

== Description ==
=== General ===
Perrier's baobab is a medium to large deciduous tree, growing to 30 m tall, occurring in evergreen rainforests and forming an important component of dry deciduous forest. The trunk is roughly cylindrical and the bark a smooth, pale grey. Baobab trees have two types of shoots – long, green vegetative ones, and stout, woody reproductive ones.

=== Leaves ===
This is a deciduous tree, with leaves throughout the wet season (November to April) but none in the dry season. Leaves are palmately compound in mature trees, with 5 to 11 leaflets (usually 9 or more leaflets per leaf on reproductive shoots). Seedlings and regenerating shoots may have simple leaves. The transition to compound leaves comes with age and may be gradual. Stipules occur at the base of the leaves, are triangular or linear and up to 15 mm long. In most baobabs, stipules are soon shed, but they are persistent in A. perrieri.

=== Flowers ===
Baobabs have large, showy flowers that in Perrier's baobab emerge with or just before the leaves, flowering November to December. Flowers are born near the tips of reproductive shoots, in the axils of the leaves. There is usually only a singe flower in an axil, but sometimes flowers occur in pairs. The flowers are reproductive for a maximum of 15 hours. They open around dusk; opening so quickly that movement can be detected by the naked eye and are faded by the next morning. The flower is made up of an outer 5-lobed calyx, and an inner ring of petals set around a fused tube of stamens. The calyx is green with short stiff hairs outside and cream or pinkish with long, soft hairs inside. It is made up of 5 lobes that in bud are joined almost to the tip. As the flower opens, the calyx lobes split apart and become coiled or bent back (reflexed) at the base of the flower. Sometimes the lobes do not separate cleanly, distorting the shape of the flower as they bend back. The calyx lobes remain fused at the base, leaving a feature (calyx tube) that has nectar-producing tissue and fits tightly around the petal base. The flowers have a long, narrow central tube (staminal tube) made up of fused filaments (stalks of stamens), with around 200 unfused filaments above. A densely hairy ovary is enclosed in the staminal tube with a long style tipped with a red or pink stigma emerging from the filaments. Petals are set near the base of the staminal tube and are pale yellow, becoming darker with age. Flowers of Perrier's baobab are pollinated primarily by long-tongued hawkmoths (Coelonia solani and Xanthopan morganii).

=== Fruits ===
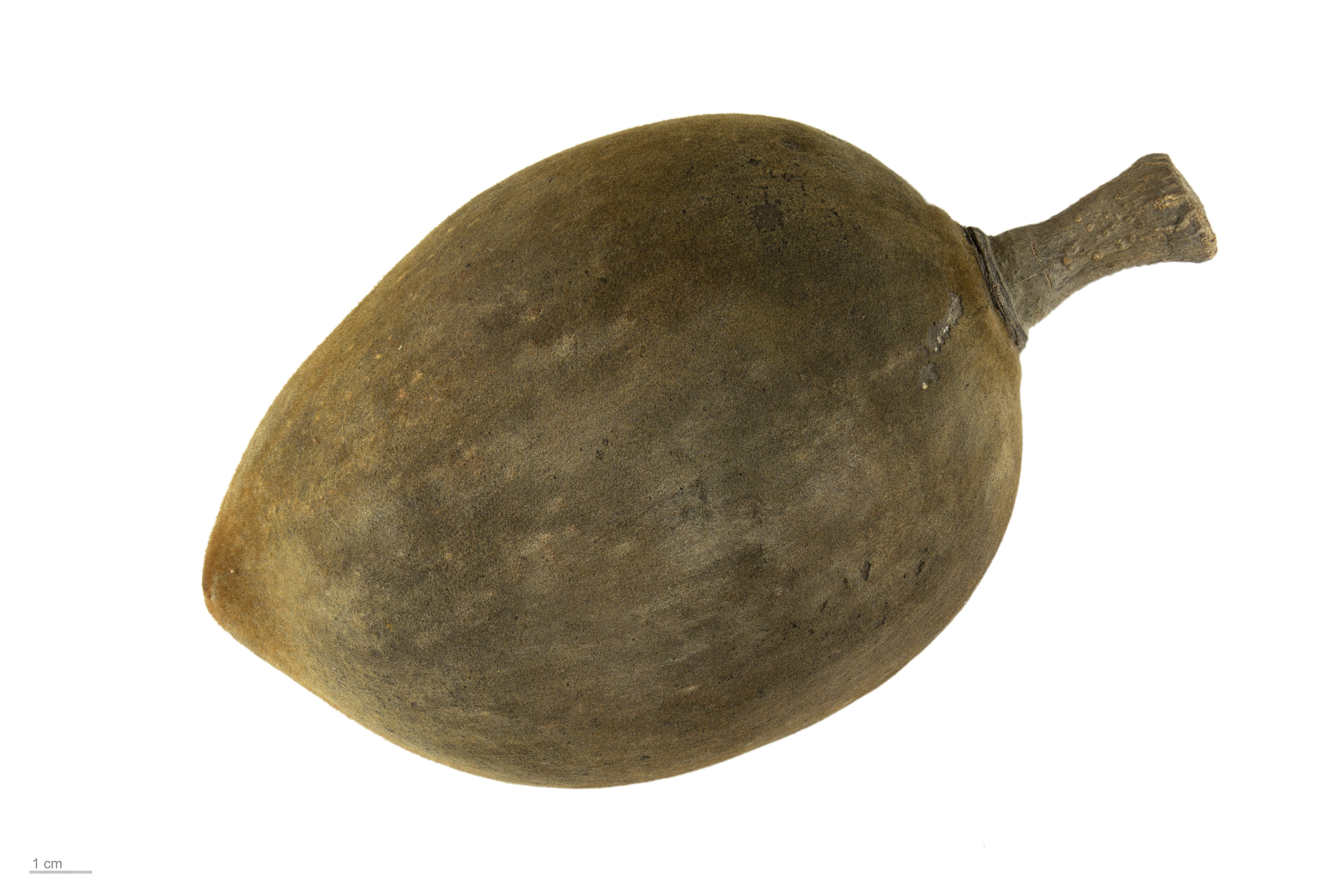
Adansonia perrieri (MHNT)

The fruits are large (up to 25 cm long), oblong to egg-shaped and berry-like. They are ripe in October and November. They have a tough 8–9 mm thick outer wall and hold kidney-shaped seeds in a dry, pulpy matrix. The fruits are buoyant and at least in some populations may be dispersed by floating along water courses.

== Uses ==
Fruits are collected for their edible pulp, and trees are cut for charcoal or timber.

== Taxonomy ==
The specific Latin epithet of perrieri refers to the French botanist Joseph Marie Henry Alfred Perrier de la Bâthie (1873–1958), who studied plants in Madagascar. It was first described and published in Notul. Syst. (Paris) Vol.16 on page 66 in 1960.
