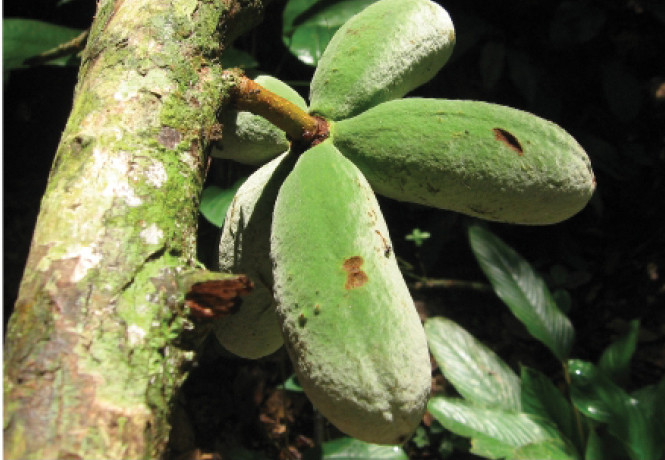
- Color photograph of Uvariastrum pierreanum

Conservation status
- Least Concern (IUCN 3.1)

Scientific classification
- Kingdom: Plantae
- Clade: Embryophytes
- Clade: Tracheophytes
- Clade: Spermatophytes
- Clade: Angiosperms
- Clade: Magnoliids
- Order: Magnoliales
- Family: Annonaceae
- Genus: Uvariastrum
- Species: U. pierreanum

Binomial name
- Uvariastrum pierreanum Engl.

= Uvariastrum pierreanum =

Species of flowering plant

Uvariastrum pierreanum is a species of plant in the Annonaceae family. It is native to Cameroon, the Central African Republic, the Democratic Republic of the Congo, Equatorial Guinea, Gabon, Ghana, Guinea, the Ivory Coast, Liberia, Nigeria, Sierra Leone and the Republic of the Congo. Adolf Engler, the botanist who first formally described the species, named it after the French botanist Jean Baptiste Louis Pierre.

== Description ==
It is a tree reaching 20–25 meters in height. The young, light brown branches are sparsely hairy to hairless, and become hairless and brown-grey with maturity. Its narrowly elliptical to egg-shaped to oblong, papery to slightly leathery leaves are 6-16 by 2–4.5 centimeters. The leaves have wedge-shaped bases and tapering tips, with the tapering portion 0.7-2 centimeters long. The margins of the leaves are wavy. The leaves are sparsely hairy to hairless. The leaves are dark green on their upper surface and light green below. The leaves have 7-12 pairs of secondary veins emanating from their midribs. Its petioles are 2-4 by 1-1.5 millimeters, and hairless to sparsely hairy, with an indistinct groove on their upper side. Its Inflorescences occur in clusters of 1–3 on branches or are more numerous when positioned on the trunk. Each inflorescence has 1 flower. Each flower is on a sparsely to densely hairy pedicel that is 15-50 by 1-1.5 millimeters. The pedicels have a hairy, broadly oval, basal bract that is 6 by 6 millimeters. The base of the bract is flat and the tip is pointed. Its flowers have 3 oval sepals that are 1.5-2.5 by 1-2 centimeters. The sepals have sparse woolly hair on both surfaces. Its 6 petals are arranged in two rows of 3. The yellow to grey-yellow, elliptical, outer petals are 2.5-4 by 0.8-1.5 centimeters. The bases of the outer petals narrow and the tips are pointed. The upper surface of the outer petals are sparsely hairy, and the lower surfaces are densely hairy. The yellow to grey-yellow, elliptical inner petals are 1.5-2.8 by 0.6-1.5 centimeters. The upper surface of the inner petals are sparsely hairy, and the lower surfaces are densely hairy. The inner petals are narrower at the base and pointed at the tips. The flowers have numerous pink-red, hairy stamens that are 4-6 by 1 millimeters. The flowers have up to 5-10 carpels that are 4-6 by 1.5-2 millimeters, and densely hairy. The carpels have bilobed stigma that are 2 millimeters in diameter, and densely hairy. Each carpel has up to 24-35 ovules. The fruit occur in clusters of 3–5 on sparsely hairy to hairless pedicles that are 15-50 by 4-6 millimeters. The pale blue-green to brown, globe-shaped to elliptical fruit are 9-10 by 4-5 centimeters and are densely covered in light green woolly hairs. Each fruit has up to numerous dark brown to black, flat, elliptical seeds that are 15-25 by 10-15 by 5-9 millimeters.

=== Reproductive biology ===
The pollen of Uvariastrum pierreanum is shed as permanent tetrads.

=== Distribution and habitat ===
It has been observed growing in sandy or rocky soils in lowland primary and secondary rain forests or in gallery forests at altitudes up to 600 meters.

== Uses ==
Essential oil extracts from stem-bark and leaf oils have been described as having antimalarial activity in laboratory tests with Plasmodium falciparum.
