= Walter Carl Otto Busse =

German botanist (1868–1933)

- Born: 7 December 1868; Berlin, Germany
- Died: 15 December 1933 (aged 65); Rome, Italy
- Citizenship: German
- Education: University of Freiburg
- Scientific career
- Fields: Botany
- Workplaces: International Institute of Agriculture; Imperial Colonial Office
- Author abbrev. (botany): Busse

Walter Carl Otto Busse (1868 – 1933) was a German botanist, whose primary scholarly focus was on German agriculture and the plants, fungi and lichen of Africa.

== Life ==
Busse was born in Berlin, Kingdom of Prussia on 7 December 1868. He received his Ph.D. from the University of Freiburg in 1892. His first posting was in the German Imperial Health Office (Kaiserliche Gesundheitsamt). He then went on to work in the Imperial Biological Institute (Biologische Reichsanstalt) in Dahlem. In 1900 he made a plant collecting expedition to Africa. He then travelled to the Bogor Botanical Gardens (then called the Botanical Gardens in Buitenzorg) in Java to make a study of Cinchona species which have medicinal value as a source of quinine. In 1903 he returned to Africa to make collections in Tanzania, Cameroon and Togo, before returning to Germany in 1905. Following the founding of the Imperial Colonial Office (German: Reichskolonialamt) he transferred to the Department for Agriculture and Forestry. His work on tobacco and alfalfa during this time was notable. In this position he travelled to Central Asia, the Caucasus, Crimea, Turkey and North America. In 1926 he was made Privy Councilor (German: Geheimrat) on agricultural matters for the Weimar Republic to the International Institute of Agriculture in Rome. He retired in 1919.

== Work ==
During his collecting trips to Africa he was charged with assessing local woody plant species for use in commercial purposes. In addition to the many plant specimens he acquired and described, he was also noted for the photographs he took while collecting.

== Legacy ==
He is the authority for at least 31 taxa including: IPNI. List of plant names with authority Busse.

Several species are named in his honor including:

- Acalypha bussei Hutch.
- Abutilon bussei Gürke ex Ulbr.
- Aloe bussei A.Berger
- Aspilia bussei O.Hoffm. & Muschl.
- Brachystegia bussei Harms
- Diospyros bussei Gürke
- Dissotidendron bussei (Gilg ex Engl.) Ver.-Lib. & G.Kadereit
- Entandrophragma bussei Harms ex Engl.
- Euphorbia bussei Pax
- Excoecaria bussei (Pax) Pax
- Ficus bussei Warb. ex Mildbr. & Burret
- Galium bussei K.Schum. & K.Krause
- Heinsia bussei Verdc.
- Hexalobus bussei Diels
- Indigofera bussei J.B.Gillett
- Maerua bussei (Gilg & Gilg-Ben.) R.Wilczek
- Millettia bussei Harms
- Oliverella bussei (Sprague) Polhill & Wiens
- Philenoptera bussei (Harms) Schrire
- Rhodopentas bussei (K.Krause) Kårehed & B.Bremer
- Rinorea bussei M.Brandt
- Salacia bussei Loes.
- Scilla bussei Dammer
- Tetracera bussei Gilg
- Vachellia bussei (Harms ex Y.Sjöstedt) Kyal. & Boatwr.
