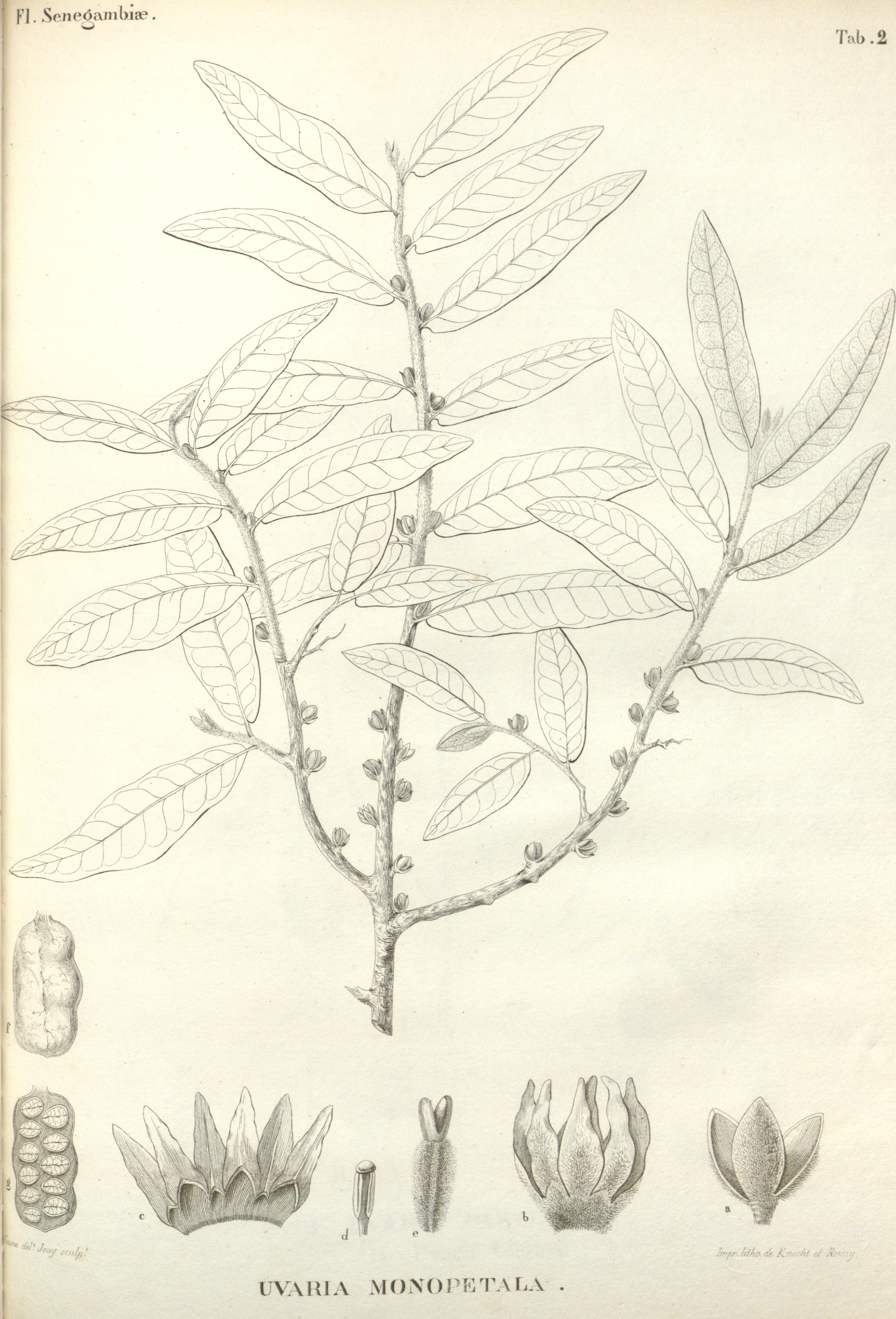
- Botanical illustration of Hexalobus monopetalus (using the basionym Uvaria monopetala

Conservation status
- Least Concern (IUCN 3.1)

Scientific classification
- Kingdom: Plantae
- Clade: Tracheophytes
- Clade: Angiosperms
- Clade: Magnoliids
- Order: Magnoliales
- Family: Annonaceae
- Genus: Hexalobus
- Species: H. monopetalus

Binomial name
- Hexalobus monopetalus (A.Rich.) Engl. & Diels

Synonyms
- Hexalobus glabrescens Hutch. & Dalziel; Hexalobus huillensis (Engl. & Diels) Engl. & Diels; Hexalobus tomentosus A.Chev. Uva huillensis (Engl. & Diels) Kuntze; Uvaria huillensis Engl. & Diels; Uvaria monopetala A.Rich.

= Hexalobus monopetalus =

Species of plant in the soursop family

Hexalobus monopetalus is a species of plant in the family Annonaceae with the common name baboon's breakfast. It is native to Angola, Benin, Botswana, Burkina Faso, Cameroon, Central African Republic, Chad, Gambia, Ghana, Guinea, Guinea-Bissau, Ivory Coast, Liberia, Malawi, Mali, Mozambique, Namibia, Niger, Nigeria, Senegal, South Africa, Sudan, Tanzania, Togo, Uganda, Zambia, Zaire and Zimbabwe. Achille Richard, the French botanist who first formally described the species, using the basionym Uvaria monopetala, named it after its petals which are fused at their base.

== Description ==
It is a bush or small tree reaching 15 meters (49 ft) in height. It can have multiple stems, and either an upright or spreading posture, and its lowest branches may lie on the ground. Its bark is gray and variably textured from smooth, to rough, to flaky. Its petioles are 1–4 by 1.2 millimeters with a channel on their upper side. The petioles are covered in curly, light-colored hairs that are 0.2-0.3 millimeters long. Its oblong to elliptical, papery to slightly leathery leaves are 3.6-17.5 by 1.2-6.5 centimeters with rounded to shallowly pointed tips (sometimes slightly notched), and rounded to wedge-shaped bases. The upper sides of the leaves are slightly glossy and hairless to sparsely covered in cream-colored hairs that are 0.3 millimeters long. The undersides of the leaves are hairless to densely covered with straight to curly hairs that are 0.2-0.8 millimeters long. The leaves have 6–15 pairs of secondary veins emanating from their midribs at angles of 50°–80° that arch and connect with one another near the leaf margins. Its fragrant flowers occur in groups of 1–3 among leaves, on twigs, or directly from the trunk and are born on short, 2 by 2 millimeter peduncles. The peduncles have 5–6, oval, concave bracts that are up to 5 by 3.5 millimeters. At maturity the peduncles are covered in dense cream to rust-colored hairs that are 0.3 millimeters long. Its oval to round flower buds are 3-5 millimeters in diameter. Its flowers have 3, broadly oval, concave sepals that are 4–7 by 3.5.5 millimeters and fused at the base. The outer surfaces of the sepals are covered in silky hairs and the insides are wrinkled. Its flowers have 6 petals arranged in two rows of three. The light-yellow petals are fused at their bases to form a tube with narrow, lance-shaped lobes. The bases of the floral tubes are 2.5-4 millimeters long. The lobes are 9–27 by 3.7 millimeters with irregular folds and shallowly pointed to rounded tips. The margins of the inner petals are curved back to form hollow chambers in the basal tube. The outer surface of the corolla is covered in 0.1 millimeter-long white, silky hairs that turn to rust-colored 0.2 millimeter-long, silky hairs at the base. The inner surface of the corolla is covered in short hairs, except the base which is hairless. Its flowers have numerous oblong stamen that are 1.4-2.1 by 0.5-0.8 millimeters. The connective tissue between the lobes of the anthers extends upward to form a disc-shaped cap. Its flowers have 2–7 carpels that are 2.1-3 by 0.8-1 millimeters and covered in dense gold to rust-colored hairs. Its bilobed stigma are 1-1.3 millimeters long. Its brilliant red, elliptical to cylindrical fruit occur in groups of 1–5 and are 2.2-4.6 by 1.3-2.2 centimeters. The contour of the fruits surface can be constricted around its seeds and is warty to wrinkled. The fruits are covered in short hairs. The fruit have light-colored pulp. The fruit have 2–11 brown, flat, elliptical to oval seeds that are 10–15 by 7-10 millimeters and are arranged in 1–2 rows.

=== Reproductive biology ===
The pollen of H. monopetalus is shed as permanent tetrads.

== Habitat and distribution ==
It has been observed growing in savannas in forest corridors at elevations of 0 to 1,600 meters (5,200 ft). It prefers sandy soil or dry rocky substrates.

== Uses ==
Bioactive molecules extracted from its fruit have been reported to have antifungal activity in test with Candida albicans.
