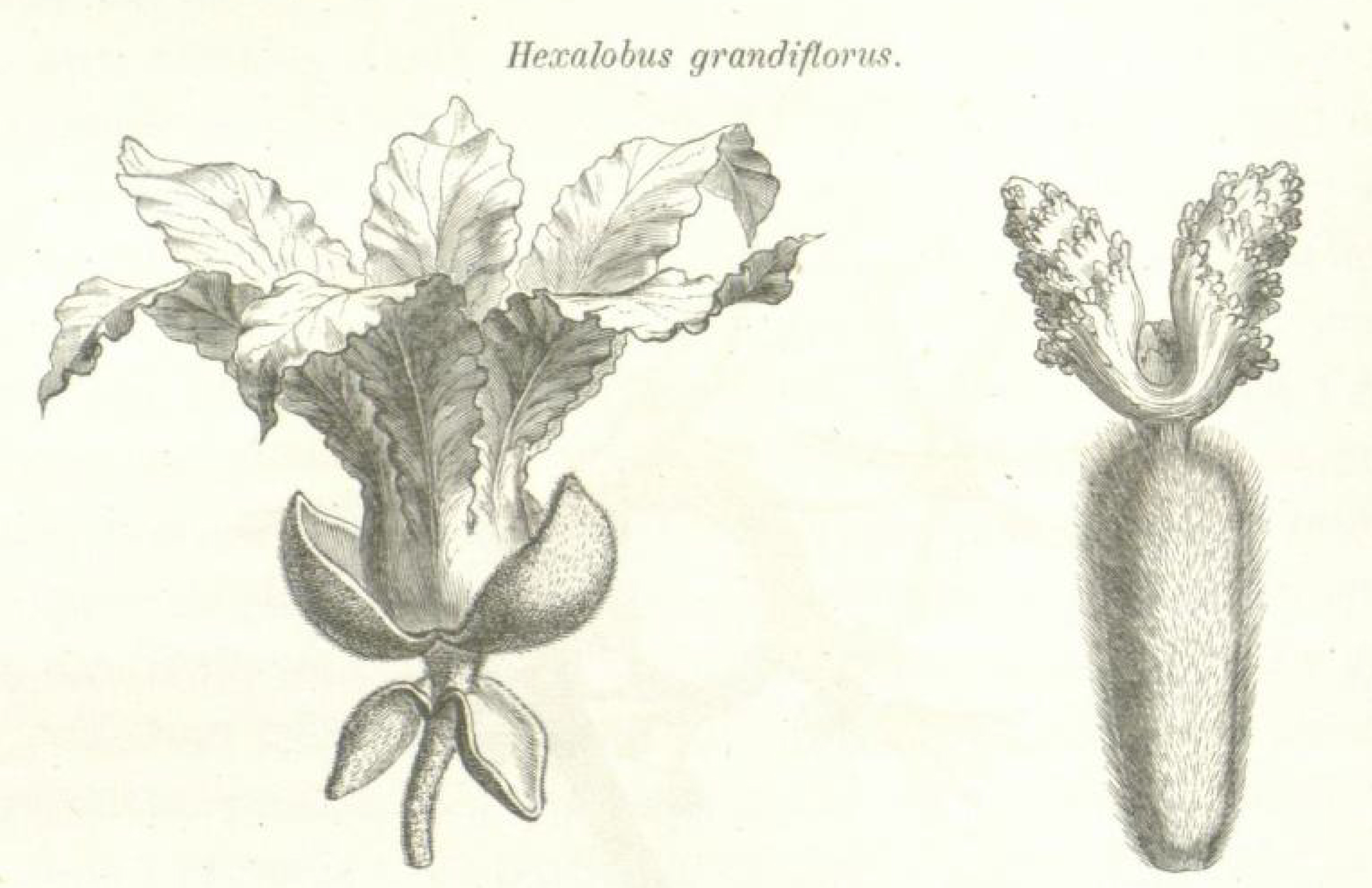
- Botanical illustration of Hexalobus crispiflorus (using the synonym Hexalobus grandiflorus)

Conservation status
- Least Concern (IUCN 3.1)

Scientific classification
- Kingdom: Plantae
- Clade: Embryophytes
- Clade: Tracheophytes
- Clade: Spermatophytes
- Clade: Angiosperms
- Clade: Magnoliids
- Order: Magnoliales
- Family: Annonaceae
- Genus: Hexalobus
- Species: H. crispiflorus

Binomial name
- Hexalobus crispiflorus A. Rich.

Synonyms
- Hexalobus grandiflorus Benth. Hexalobus lujae De Wild. Hexalobus mbula Exell

= Hexalobus crispiflorus =

Species of plant

Hexalobus crispiflorus is a species of plant in the family Annonaceae. It is native to Angola, Benin, Cameroon, Central African Republic, Congo, DR Congo, Gabon, Ghana, Guinea, Guinea-Bissau, Ivory Coast, Liberia, Nigeria, Senegal, Sierra Leone, Sudan, Togo and Zaire. Achille Richard, the French botanist who first formally described the species, named it after its wavy (crispus in Latin) petals of its flowers.

== Description ==
It is a tree reaching 40 meters (130 ft) in height. Its trunk has deep vertical channels. Its brown to rust-colored bark has vertical cracks and peels off in long narrow strips. Its small branches are covered in dense hairs. Its petioles are 2–8 by 1–2.5 millimeters and covered in dense light-colored to brown hairs. Its elliptical to lance-shaped, leathery leaves are 7.2-25 by 2.5-8.5 centimeters with tapering tips that end in a blunt point and bases that are varyingly heat-shaped, rounded or wedge-shaped. The upper surfaces of the leaves are glossy, grey, hairless and sometimes have a puckered appearance from their venation. The undersides of the leaves are covered in sparse brown hairs that are 0.3 millimeters long. The leaves have 9–19 pairs of secondary veins emanating from their midribs at angles of 42°-75°. Its fragrant, bisexual flowers occur in groups of 1–3 on peduncles that are 2–13 by 1-2 millimeters. The flowers are attached to the peduncles by pedicels that are 4–17 by 1.2-3 millimeters. The peduncle has 5–6 bracts that are 8–12 by 4-9 millimeters. The top two bracts are fused at their base to form a tube that is 4 millimeters long. The peduncle and pedicles are covered in dense golden to rusty hairs. Its 3 sepals are 12–21 by 5.5-16 millimeters and bent backwards at maturity. The outer surfaces of sepals are densely covered in 0.1-millimeter-long rust-colored hairs interspersed with longer hairs up to 2 millimeters. The insides of the sepals are densely covered in curly hairs. Its flowers have 6 petals that are fused at the base to form a 6-lobed corolla that is yellow with a purple base. The basal tubes of the corollas are 4-10 millimeters long. The lance-shaped lobes are 37–80 by 6-21 millimeters with rounded tips. The corollas are covered with light-colored to brown hairs except on the basal internal surfaces which are sometimes hairless. The margins of the lobes of the corolla are wavy. Its flowers have numerous oblong stamen that are 3–5.1 by 0.5-0.8 millimeters.

The connective tissue between the lobes of the anther extends upward to form a rounded cap. Its flowers have 7–16 densely hairy carpels. Its stigma are positioned horizontally on the ovaries and are 2.1-3.5 by 1.1-3.1 millimeters. The smooth, oblong to elliptical fruit occur in groups of 1-8 and are 4.2-9.5 by 3.5-6.5 centimeters. The fruit range from hairless to densely covered in velvety rust-colored hairs that are 0.1 millimeters long. The fruit have 12-36 brown, flattened, elliptical, convex seeds that are 2.8-4 by 1.7-2 by 0.5-0.9 centimeters.

=== Reproductive biology ===
The pollen of H. bussei is shed as permanent tetrads.

== Habitat and distribution ==
It has been observed growing in tropical rainforests and woodland savannas at elevations of 0 to 1,000 meters (0 to 3,281 ft).

== Uses ==
Bioactive molecules extracted from its bark have been reported to have antiplasmodial activity in tests with Plasmodium falciparum.
