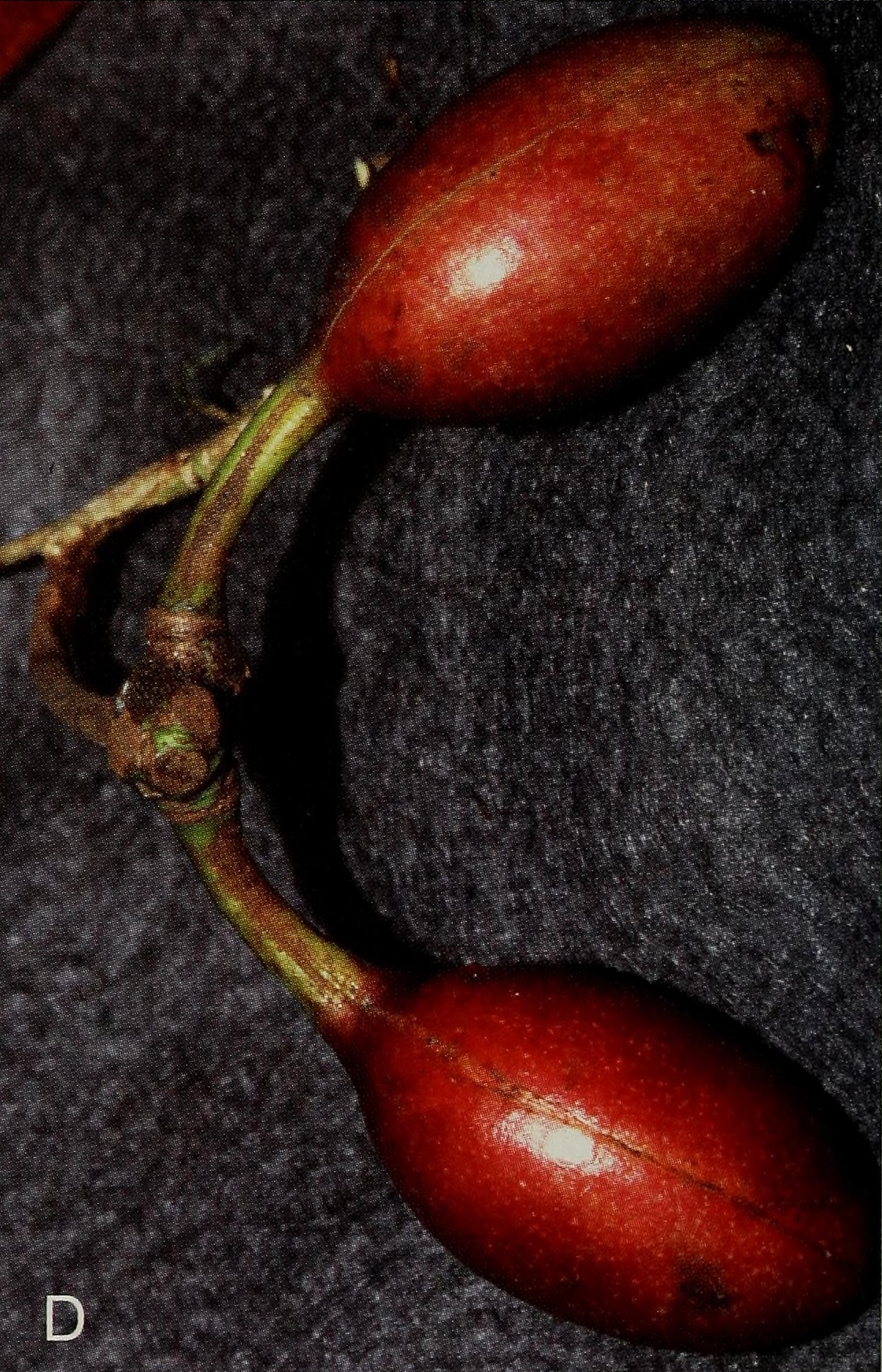
- Fruit

Conservation status
- Endangered (IUCN 3.1)

Scientific classification
- Kingdom: Plantae
- Clade: Embryophytes
- Clade: Tracheophytes
- Clade: Spermatophytes
- Clade: Angiosperms
- Clade: Magnoliids
- Order: Magnoliales
- Family: Annonaceae
- Genus: Klarobelia
- Species: K. megalocarpa

Binomial name
- Klarobelia megalocarpa Chatrou

= Klarobelia megalocarpa =

Species of flowering plant

Klarobelia megalocarpa is a species of flowering plants in the family Annonaceae. It is endemic to Ecuador. Its natural habitat is subtropical or tropical moist lowland forests. It is threatened by habitat loss.
