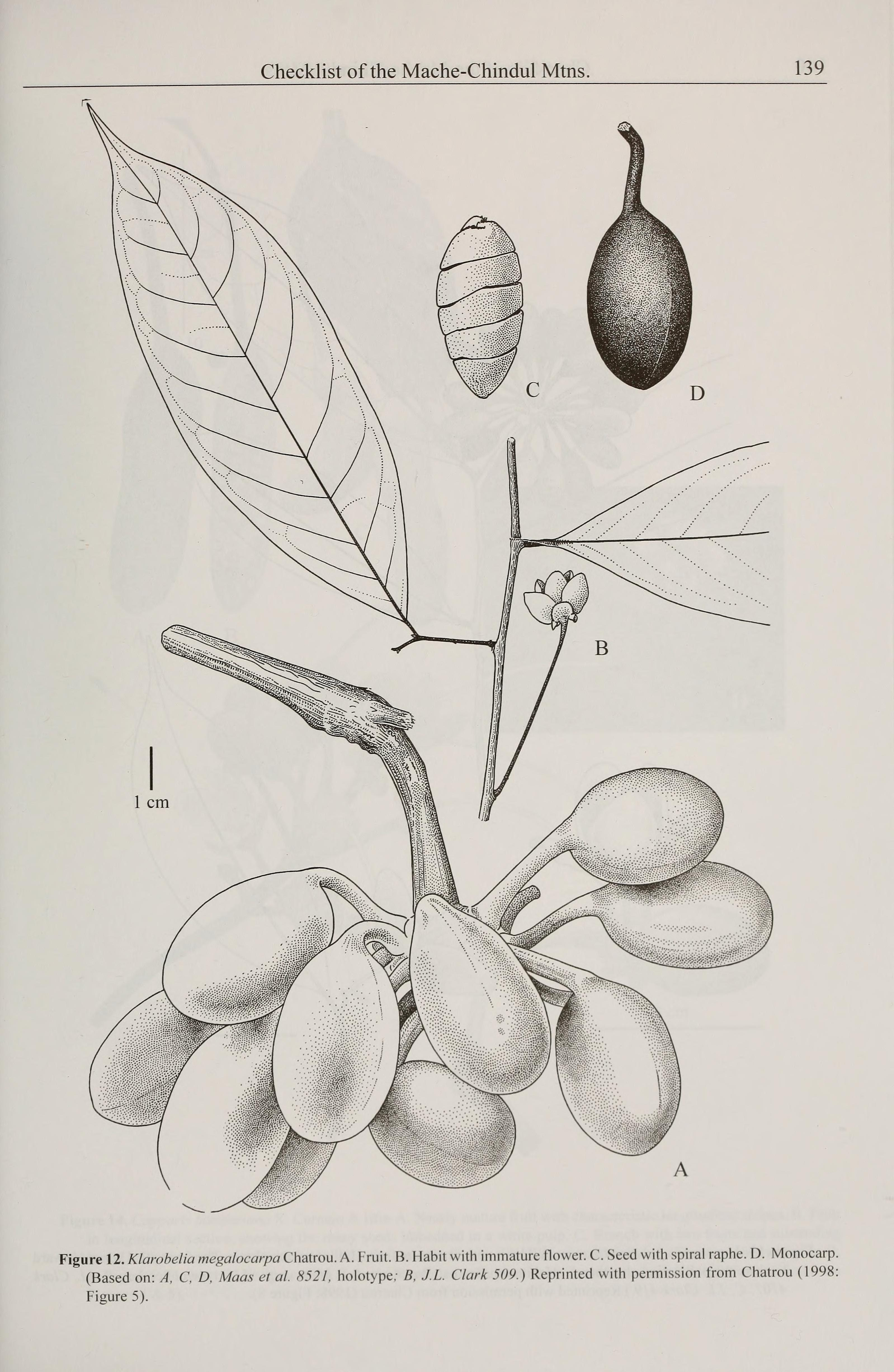
- Klarobelia megalocarpa

Scientific classification
- Kingdom: Plantae
- Clade: Embryophytes
- Clade: Tracheophytes
- Clade: Spermatophytes
- Clade: Angiosperms
- Clade: Magnoliids
- Order: Magnoliales
- Family: Annonaceae
- Genus: Klarobelia; Chatrou

= Klarobelia =

Genus of flowering plants

Klarobelia is a genus of flowering plants in the family Annonaceae. It includes 14 species native to the tropical Americas, ranging from Costa Rica to northern Brazil and Bolivia.

== Species ==
14 species are accepted.

- Klarobelia anomala (R.E.Fr.) Chatrou
- Klarobelia candida Chatrou
- Klarobelia cauliflora Chatrou
- Klarobelia icoja Lara-Guerrero & Chatrou
- Klarobelia inundata Chatrou
- Klarobelia lucida (Diels) Chatrou
- Klarobelia megalocarpa Chatrou
- Klarobelia napoensis Chatrou
- Klarobelia pandoensis Chatrou
- Klarobelia peruviana (R.E.Fr.) Chatrou
- Klarobelia pumila Chatrou
- Klarobelia rocioae Chatrou
- Klarobelia stipitata Chatrou
- Klarobelia subglobosa Chatrou
