= Klarobelia lucida =

Conservation status
- Vulnerable (IUCN 3.1)

Scientific classification
- Kingdom: Plantae
- Clade: Embryophytes
- Clade: Tracheophytes
- Clade: Spermatophytes
- Clade: Angiosperms
- Clade: Magnoliids
- Order: Magnoliales
- Family: Annonaceae
- Genus: Klarobelia
- Species: K. lucida

Binomial name
- Klarobelia lucida (Diels) Chatrou

Synonyms
- Malmea lucida Diels; Malmea macrocarpa R.E.Fr.

Species of flowering plant

Klarobelia lucida is a species of flowering plant in the Annonaceae family. It is a tree native to Ecuador and Peru. Its natural habitat is subtropical or tropical dry forests. It is threatened by habitat loss.
