= Stenanona panamensis =

Conservation status
- Endangered (IUCN 2.3)

Scientific classification
- Kingdom: Plantae
- Clade: Tracheophytes
- Clade: Angiosperms
- Clade: Magnoliids
- Order: Magnoliales
- Family: Annonaceae
- Genus: Stenanona
- Species: S. panamensis

Binomial name
- Stenanona panamensis Standl.

Species of flowering plant

Stenanona panamensis is a species of plant in the Annonaceae family. It is found in Costa Rica and Panama. It is threatened by habitat loss.
