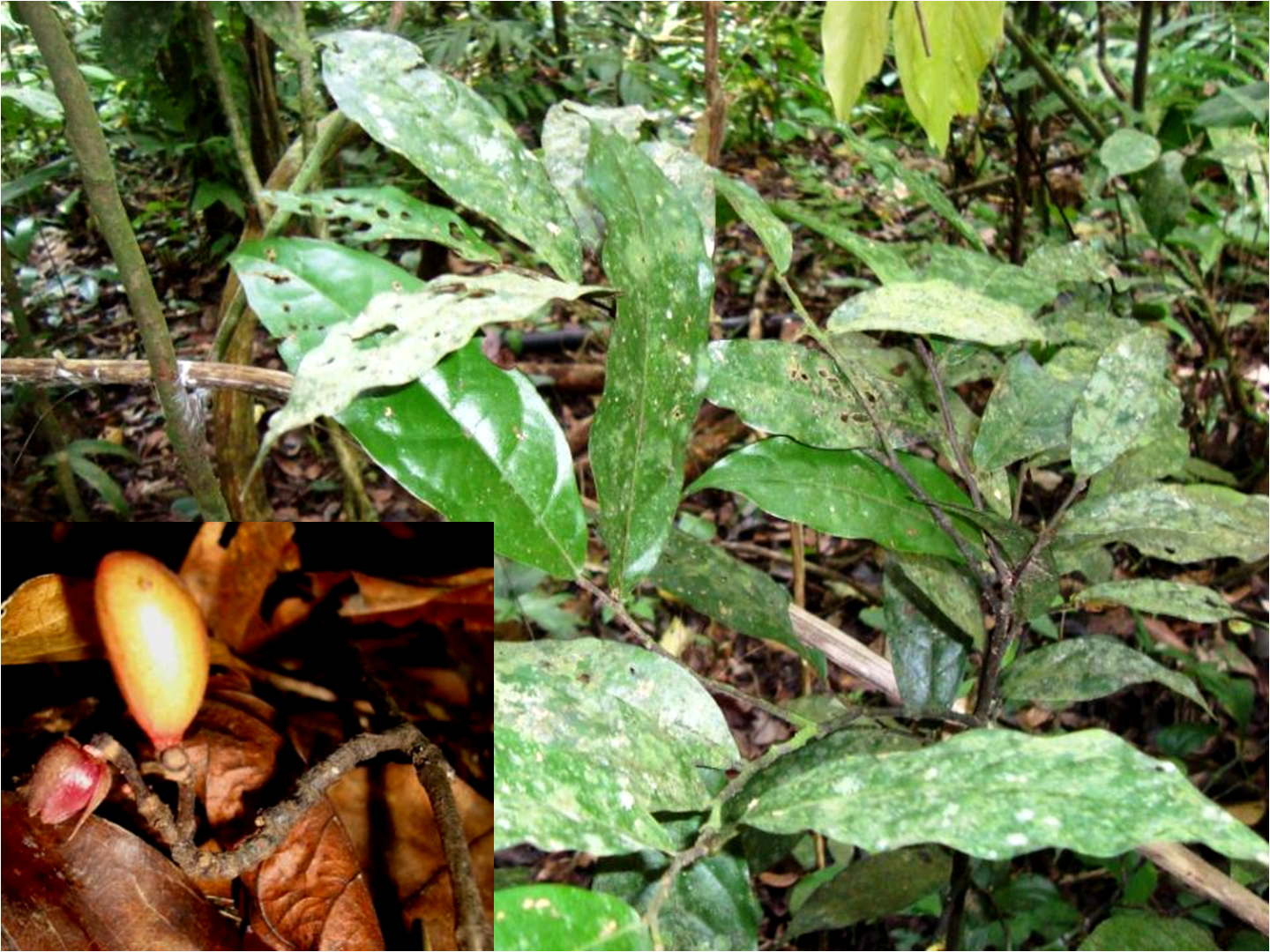
- Stenanona flagelliflora

Scientific classification
- Kingdom: Plantae
- Clade: Tracheophytes
- Clade: Angiosperms
- Clade: Magnoliids
- Order: Magnoliales
- Family: Annonaceae
- Tribe: Miliuseae
- Genus: Stenanona; Standl.

Synonyms
- Reedrollinsia J.W.Walker

= Stenanona =

Genus of flowering plants

Stenanona is a genus of flowering plants in the family Annonaceae. There are about 14 species native to Mexico and Central and South America. The genus is found in rainforest habitat.

These plants are small trees. The leaves have a coating of hairs and are borne on swollen petioles. The petals are somewhat thin but moderately fleshy in texture and are various shades of pink or red; one species has purple flowers. The petals sometimes fade whitish. The flowers are bisexual.

Species include:

- Stenanona carrillensis
- Stenanona cauliflora
- Stenanona columbiensis
- Stenanona costaricensis
- Stenanona flagelliflora
- Stenanona hondurensis
- Stenanona humilis
- Stenanona migueliana
- Stenanona monticola
- Stenanona narinensis
- Stenanona panamensis
- Stenanona stenopetala
- Stenanona tuberculata
- Stenanona tubiflora
- Stenanona wendtii
