= Wangia =

Wangia is the scientific name of three genera of organisms and may refer to:

- Wangia (fish), a prehistoric genus of ray-finned fishes
- Wangia (plant), a genus of plants in the family Annonaceae
- Wangia (bacterium), a genus of bacteria in the family Flavobacteriaceae
