= Wangia florulenta =

Scientific classification
- Kingdom: Plantae
- Clade: Embryophytes
- Clade: Tracheophytes
- Clade: Angiosperms
- Clade: Magnoliids
- Order: Magnoliales
- Family: Annonaceae
- Genus: Wangia
- Species: W. florulenta

Binomial name
- Wangia florulenta (C.Y.Wu ex P.T.Li) B.Xue

Species of flowering plant

Wangia florulenta is a plant in the Annonaceae family. It grows in China.
