= Wangia (plant) =

Scientific classification
- Kingdom: Plantae
- Clade: Tracheophytes
- Clade: Angiosperms
- Clade: Magnoliids
- Order: Magnoliales
- Family: Annonaceae
- Subfamily: Malmeoideae
- Tribe: Miliuseae
- Genus: Wangia; X.Guo & R.M.K.Saunders (2014)

Species
- Wangia florulenta (C.Y.Wu ex P.T.Li) B.Xue; Wangia saccopetaloides (W.T.Wang) X.Guo & R.M.K.Saunders

Genus of flowering plants

Wangia is a genus of flowering plants in the family Annonaceae. It includes two species endemic to south-central China.

- Wangia florulenta (C.Y.Wu ex P.T.Li) B.Xue
- Wangia saccopetaloides (W.T.Wang) X.Guo & R.M.K.Saunders
