= Wangia (fish) =

Wangia Temporal range: Middle Eocene

Scientific classification
- Kingdom: Animalia
- Phylum: Chordata
- Class: Actinopterygii
- Order: Perciformes
- Genus: †Wangia; Fowler, 1954

Extinct genus of fishes

Wangia is an extinct genus of prehistoric bony fish that lived during the middle division of the Eocene epoch.
