= Trigynaea =

Scientific classification
- Kingdom: Plantae
- Clade: Tracheophytes
- Clade: Angiosperms
- Clade: Magnoliids
- Order: Magnoliales
- Family: Annonaceae
- Genus: Trigynaea; Schltdl.

Genus of flowering plants

Trigynaea is a genus of plants in the family Annonaceae. It contains the following species (but this list may be incomplete):

- Trigynaea triplinervis D.M.Johnson & N.A.Murray
