= Trigynaea triplinervis =

Conservation status
- Near Threatened (IUCN 3.1)

Scientific classification
- Kingdom: Plantae
- Clade: Tracheophytes
- Clade: Angiosperms
- Clade: Magnoliids
- Order: Magnoliales
- Family: Annonaceae
- Genus: Trigynaea
- Species: T. triplinervis

Binomial name
- Trigynaea triplinervis D.M.Johnson & N.A.Murray

Species of flowering plant

Trigynaea triplinervis is a species of plant in the family Annonaceae. It is endemic to Ecuador. Its natural habitat is subtropical or tropical moist lowland forests. It is threatened by habitat loss.
