= Mitrella =

Mitrella may refer to:

- Mitrella (gastropod), a genus of mollusks of the family Columbellidae
- Mitrella (plant), a genus of plants of the family Annonaceae
