= List of endemic flora of Puerto Rico =

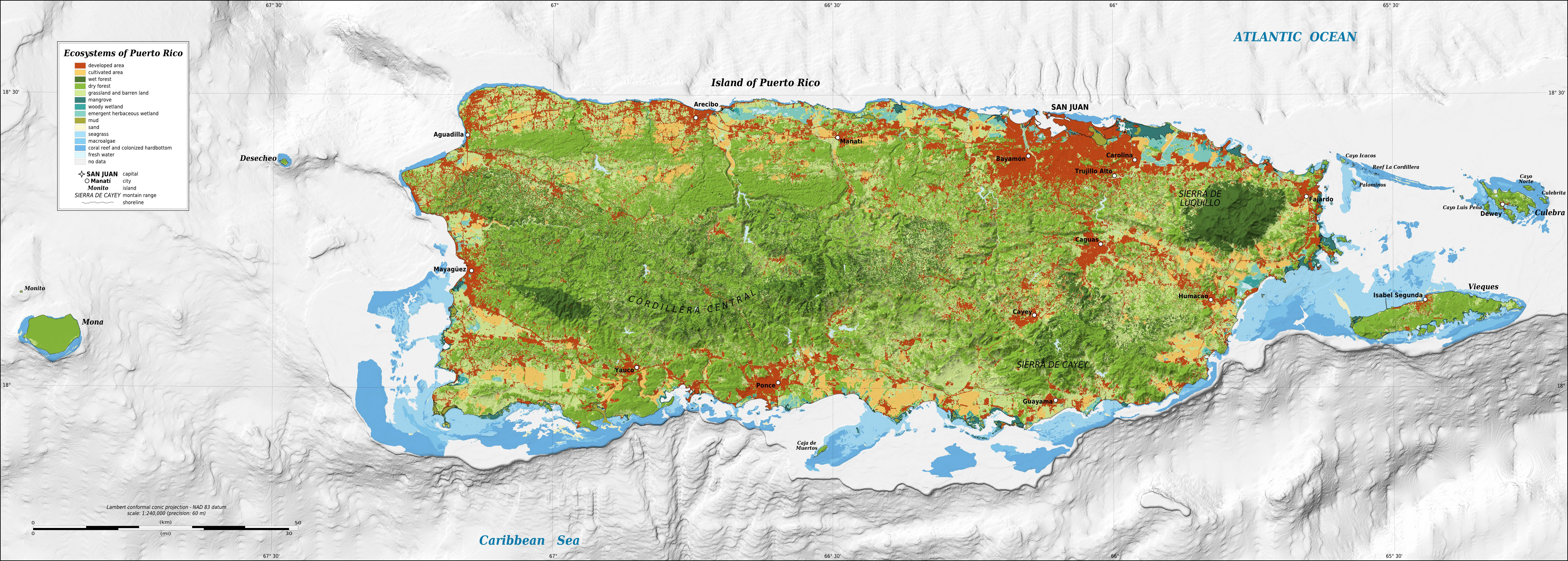
Map of the ecosystems of Puerto Rico

This is a list of the endemic flora of Puerto Rico. This list is sorted in alphabetical order by plant family and binomial names.

== Acanthaceae ==
- Dicliptera krugii Urb.
- Justicia culubritae Urb. (Culebra I.)
- Justicia martinsoniana R.A.Howard

== Amaryllidaceae ==
- Zephyranthes proctorii Acev.-Rodr. & M.T.Strong

== Apocynaceae ==
- Matelea sintenisii (Schltr.) Woodson
- Matelea variifolia (Schltr.) Woodson
- Metastelma monense Britton
- Pinochia corymbosa subsp. portoricensis (Woodson) M.E.Endress & B.F.Hansen
- Plumeria krugii Urb.
- Ruehssia elliptica (Decne.) Acev.-Rodr.
- Ruehssia woodburyana (Acev.-Rodr.) Goyder (Puerto Rico incl. Mona I.)

== Aquifoliaceae ==
- Ilex cookii Britton & P.Wilson – Cook's holly

== Araceae ==
- Xanthosoma acevedoi Croat & Delannay

== Araliaceae ==
- Dendropanax laurifolius (Marchal ex Urb.) R.C.Schneid.
- Frodinia gleasonii (Britton & P.Wilson) Lowry & G.M.Plunkett

== Asparagaceae ==
- Agave minor Proctor – (Cabo Rojo)

== Aspleniaceae ==
- Asplenium corderoanum Proctor
- Asplenium ocoense C.Chr.
- Thelypteris abdita Proctor
- Thelypteris brittoniae (Sloss. ex Maxon) Alain
- Thelypteris hildae Proctor
- Thelypteris inabonensis Proctor
- Thelypteris namaphila Proctor
- Thelypteris rheophyta Proctor
- Thelypteris verecunda Proctor
- Thelypteris yaucoensis Proctor

== Asteraceae ==
- Ageratina resiniflua (Urb.) R.M.King & H.Rob.
- Chromolaena borinquensis (Britton) R.M.King & H.Rob.
- Chromolaena geranifolia (Urb.) R.M.King & H.Rob.
- Chromolaena oteroi (Monach.) R.M.King & H.Rob.
- Critonia portoricensis Britton & P.Wilson
- Koanophyllon dolicholepis (Urb.) R.M.King & H.Rob.
- Koanophyllon droserolepis (B.L.Rob.) R.M.King & H.Rob.
- Koanophyllon polyodon (Urb.) R.M.King & H.Rob.
- Lepidaploa borinquensis (Urb.) H.Rob.
- Lepidaploa proctorii (Urbatsch) H.Rob. (synonym Vernonia proctorii Urbatsch) (known only from the summit of Cerro Mariquita in the Sierra Bermeja)
- Mikania fragilis Urb.
- Mikania odoratissima Urb.
- Mikania pachyphylla Urb.
- Mikania porosa Urb.
- Mikania pachyphylla Urb.
- Mikania stevensiana Britton
- Piptocarpha tetrantha Urb.
- Piptocoma acevedoi Pruski

== Begoniaceae ==
- Begonia decandra Pav. ex A.DC.

== Bignoniaceae ==
- Crescentia portoricensis Britton – Higuero de sierra
- Tabebuia haemantha (Bertol. ex Spreng.) DC.
- Tabebuia karsoana Trejo
- Tabebuia rigida Urb.
- Tabebuia schumanniana Urb.

== Boraginaceae ==
- Cordia borinquensis Urb. – Luquillo Mountain manjack
- Varronia bellonis (Urb.) Britton
- Varronia wagnerorum (R.A.Howard) Borhidi

== Bromeliaceae ==
- Tillandsia borinquensis Cedeño-Mald. & Proctor
- Werauhia proctorii Cedeño-Mald.
- Wittmackia portoricensis (Mez) Aguirre-Santoro

== Buxaceae ==
- Buxus portoricensis Alain

== Cactaceae ==
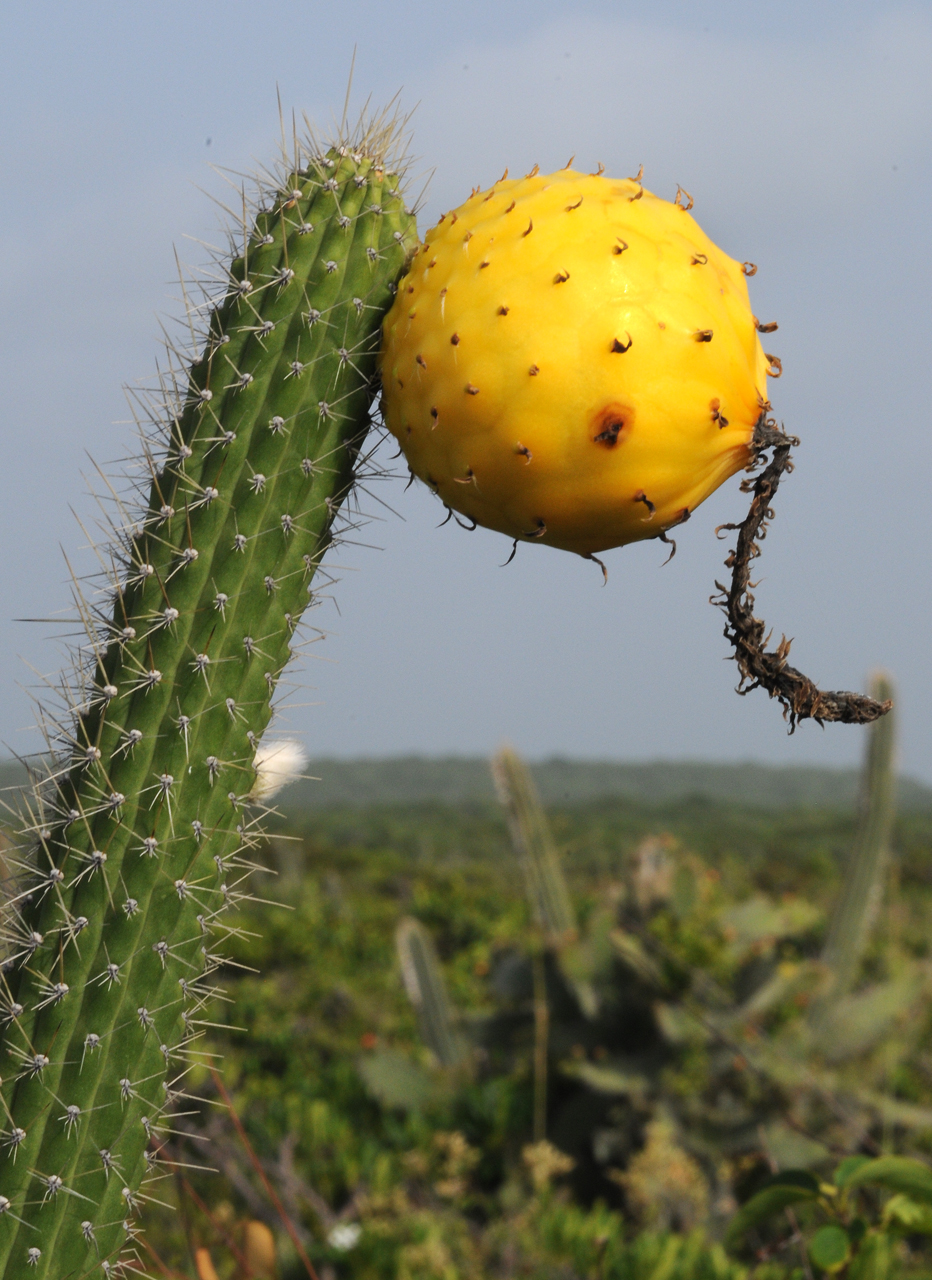
Harrisia portoricensis on Mona Island

- Harrisia portoricensis – Puerto Rico applecactus
- Leptocereus grantianus Britton (Culebra Islands)
- Melocactus praerupticola subsp. pygmaeus (Hoxey, Gdaniec & Ackerman) Areces

== Campanulaceae ==
- Lobelia portoricensis (Vatke) Urb.
- Lobelia vivaldii Lammers & Proctor (Mona I.)

== Canellaceae ==
- Pleodendron macranthum (Baill.) Tiegh. – Chupacallos

== Celastraceae ==
- Maytenus elongata (Urb.) Britton
- Maytenus ponceana Britton

== Clusiaceae ==
- Clusia gundlachii A.Stahl
- Garcinia hessii (Britton) Alain
- Garcinia portoricensis (Urb.) Alain

== Cyatheaceae ==
- Alsophila aminta D.S.Conant (synonym Cyathea dryopteroides Maxon)
- Alsophila bryophila R.M.Tryon
- Alsophila portoricensis (Kuhn) D.S.Conant
- Cyathea borinquena (Maxon) Domin
- Cyathea ruttenbergiae A.Tejedor & F.Areces

== Cyperaceae ==
- Cyperus pulguerensis M.T.Strong
- Cyperus urbani Boeckeler
- Rhynchospora depressirostris M.T.Strong
- Scleria canescens Boeckeler

== Dioscoreaceae ==
- Dioscorea cordata var. cymulifera (Uline ex R.Knuth) Raz

== Ebenaceae ==
- Diospyros sintenisii (Krug & Urb.) Standl.

== Ericaceae ==
- Gonocalyx concolor Nevling
- Gonocalyx portoricensis (Urb.) A.C.Sm.
- Lyonia truncata var. proctorii Judd (Known only from the summit of Cerro Mariquita in the Sierra Bermeja)

== Euphorbiaceae ==
- Acalypha berteroana Müll.Arg.
- Acalypha bisetosa Bertol. ex Spreng.
- Alchorneopsis portoricensis Urb.
- Croton glandulosus var. glabratus Urb.
- Croton pavonianus Radcl.-Sm. & Govaerts
- Croton poecilanthus Urb.
- Euphorbia orbifolia (Alain) Oudejans
- Sapium laurocerasus Desf.

== Fabaceae ==
- Caesalpinia monensis Britton (Mona Is.)
- Calliandra haematomma var. locoensis (R.G.García & Kolterman) Barneby (southwestern Puerto Rico)
- Chamaecrista glandulosa var. mirabilis (Pollard) H.S.Irwin & Barneby
- Dalea carthagenensis var. portoricana Barneby
- Guilandina culebrae Britton & P.Wilson (Culebra Islands)
- Guilandina portoricensis Britton & P.Wilson
- Mimosa quadrivalvis var. urbaniana Barneby
- Rhodopis volubilis (Willd.) L.P.Queiroz
- Senna pendula var. stahlii (Urb.) H.S.Irwin & Barneby

== Gentianaceae ==
- Lisianthius laxiflorus Urb.

== Gesneriaceae ==
- Columnea ambigua (Urb.) B.D.Morley
- Gesneria citrina Urb.
- Gesneria cuneifolia (DC.) Fritsch
- Gesneria pauciflora Urb.
- Gesneria pedunculosa (DC.) Fritsch
- Gesneria sintenisii Urb.

== Lamiaceae ==
- Cornutia obovata Urb.

== Lauraceae ==
- Ocotea portoricensis Mez

== Loranthaceae ==
- Dendropemon bicolor Krug & Urb.
- Dendropemon sintenisii Krug & Urb.

== Magnoliaceae ==
- Magnolia portoricensis Bello
- Magnolia splendens Urb.

== Malpighiaceae ==
- Byrsonima wadsworthii Little
- Heteropteris wydleriana A.Juss.

== Malvaceae ==
- Thespesia grandiflora DC. – Flor de maga

== Marcgraviaceae ==
- Marcgravia sintenisii Urb. Bejuco de palma, Bejuco de lira, Bejuco de rana, Lira del Yunque, Pegapalma

== Melastomataceae ==
- Henriettea membranifolia (Cogn.) Alain
- Henriettea squamulosa (Cogn.) Judd
- Miconia biflora (Cogn.) Judd
- Miconia foveolata Cogn.
- Miconia krugiana (Cogn.) Majure & Judd
- Miconia pachyphylla Cogn.
- Miconia pycnoneura Urb.
- Miconia sintenisii Cogn.
- Miconia urbanii (Cogn.) Judd
- Mouriri helleri var. helleri Britton
- Pleroma diffusum DC.

== Meliaceae ==
- Trichilia triacantha Urb. – A federally listed endangered species.

== Myricaceae ==
- Myrica holdridgeana Lundell

== Myrtaceae ==
- Eugenia bellonis Krug & Urb.
- Eugenia boqueronensis Britton
- Eugenia borinquensis Britton
- Eugenia eggersii Kiaersk.
- Eugenia fajardensis (Krug & Urb.) Urb.
- Eugenia haematocarpa Alain
- Eugenia padronii Alain
- Eugenia serrasuela Krug & Urb.
- Eugenia stahlii (Kiaersk.) Krug & Urb.
- Eugenia stewardsonii Britton
- Eugenia woodburyana Alain
- Myrcia acevedoi (Alain) A.R.Lourenço & E.Lucas
- Myrcia estremerae (Alain) E.Lucas & Acev.-Rodr.
- Myrcia krugii (Kiaersk.) E.Lucas & Acev.-Rodr.
- Myrcia luquillensis (Alain) E.Lucas & A.R.Lourenço – Luquillo forest lidflower
- Myrcia margarettae (Alain) Alain
- Myrcia martorellii (Alain) E.Lucas & Acev.-Rodr.
- Myrcia peduncularis (Alain) E.Lucas & Acev.-Rodr.
- Myrcia portoricensis (Britton) Cedeño-Mald. & Breckon ex F.S.Axelrod
- Myrcia sintenisiana M.F.Santos
- Myrcia tresantha E.Lucas & Acev.-Rodr.
- Myrciaria borinquena Alain
- Myrciaria myrtifolia Alain
- Pisonia horneae Trejo & Caraballo
- Pisonia roqueae Trejo & Caraballo
- Pisonia taina Trejo
- Pimenta paganii (Krug & Urb.) Flickinger (synonym Myrcia paganii Krug & Urb.)
- Psidium sintenisii – Hoja Menuda (synonym of Psidium oligospermum Mart. ex DC., non-endemic)

== Oleaceae ==
- Chionanthus holdridgii (Camp & Monach.) Stearn

== Orchidaceae ==
- Brachionidium ciliolatum Garay
- Epidendrum ackermanii Hágsater
- Epidendrum boricuomutelianum Hágsater & L.Sánchez
- Eurystyles luisortizii Ackerman
- Lepanthes caritensis Tremblay & Ackerman (eastern Puerto Rico)
- Lepanthes dodiana Stimson (eastern Puerto Rico)
- Lepanthes eltoroensis Stimson – Luquillo Mountain babyboot orchid (Luquillo Mountains)
- Lepanthes rubripetala Stimson (Cayey Mts, Luquillo Mts.)
- Lepanthes rupestris Stimson
- Lepanthes selenitepala Rchb.f.
  - Lepanthes selenitepala subsp. ackermanii Luer
  - Lepanthes selenitepala subsp. selenitepala (Luquillo Mts.)
- Lepanthes stimsonii Luer
- Lepanthes stimsonii Luer
- Lepanthes veleziana Stimson
- Lepanthes woodburyana Stimson
- Psychilis kraenzlinii (Bello) Sauleda
- Psychilis krugii (Bello) Sauleda
- Psychilis monensis Sauleda
- Psychilis × raganii Sauleda

== Passifloraceae ==
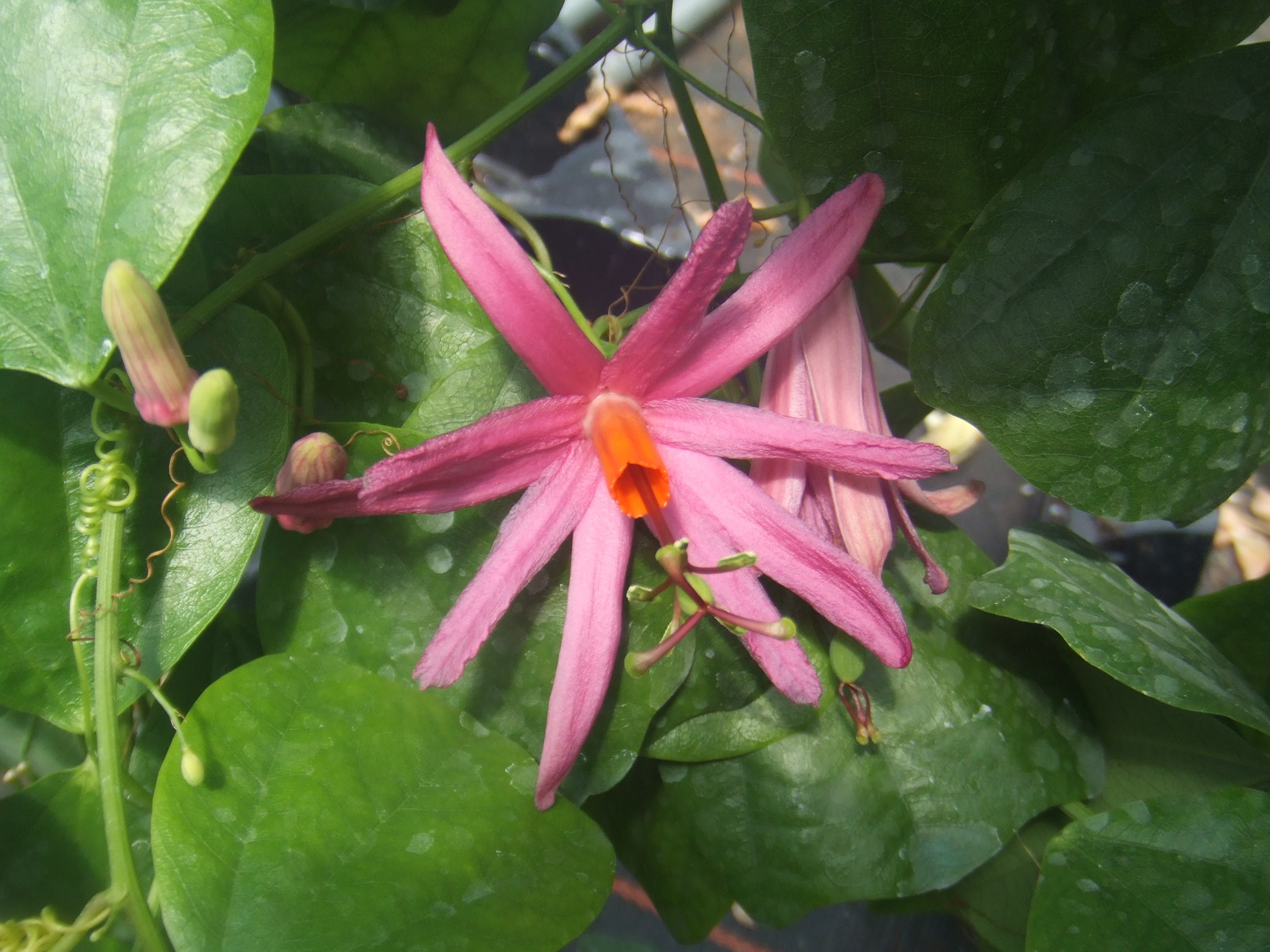
Passiflora tulae

- Passiflora tulae Urb.

== Pentaphylacaceae ==
- Ternstroemia heptasepala Krug & Urb.
- Ternstroemia luquillensis Krug & Urb.
- Ternstroemia stahlii Krug & Urb.
- Ternstroemia subsessilis (Britton) Kobuski

== Phyllanthaceae ==
- Phyllanthus cuneifolius (Britton) Croizat

== Piperaceae ==
- Peperomia megalopoda Trel.
- Peperomia robustior (Dahlst.) Urb.
- Peperomia wheeleri Britton
- Peperomia yabucoana Urb. & C.DC.
- Piper abajoense Bornst.

== Poaceae ==
- Aristida chaseae Hitchc.
- Tarigidia axelrodii A.S.Vega & Rúgolo

== Polygalaceae ==
- Phlebotaenia cowellii Britton

== Polygonaceae ==
- Coccoloba sintenisii Urb.

== Polypodiaceae ==
- Ctenitis hirta var. portoricana (C.Chr.) Proctor
- Elaphoglossum serpens Maxon & C.V.Morton
- Grammitis hanekeana Proctor
- Grammitis liogieri Proctor
- Polystichum calderonense Proctor
- Tectaria estremerana Proctor & A.M.Evans

== Portulacaceae ==
- Portulaca caulerpoides Britton & P.Wilson

== Primulaceae ==
- Ardisia glauciflora Urb.
- Ardisia luquillensis (Britton) Alain
- Bonellia pauciflora (B.Ståhl & F.S.Axelrod) B.Ståhl & Källersjö
- Cybianthus sintenisii (Urb.) G.Agostini
- Wallenia yunquensis (Urb.) Mez

== Pteridaceae ==
- Adiantum vivesii Proctor

== Rhamnaceae ==
- Auerodendron pauciflorum Alain
- Reynosia krugii Urb.
- Reynosia vivesiana Trejo

== Rubiaceae ==
- Diodia mitens Bello
- Geophila cordata Bello
- Machaonia portoricensis Baill.
- Mitracarpus maxwelliae Britton & P.Wilson
- Mitracarpus portoricensis (Urb.) Urb.
- Phialanthus grandifolius Alain
- Psychotria maricaensis Urb.
- Randia portoricensis (Urb.) Standl.
- Rondeletia inermis (Spreng.) Krug & Urb.
- Rondeletia portoricensis Krug & Urb
- Scolosanthus portoricensis Borhidi
- Stenostomum obtusifolium (Urb.) Britton & P.Wilson (syn. Antirhea obtusifolia Urb.)
- Stenostomum portoricense Britton & P.Wilson (syn. Antirhea portoricensis)
- Stenostomum sintenisii (Urb.) Britton & P.Wilson (syn. Antirhea sintenisii Urb.)

== Rutaceae ==
- Ravenia urbani Engl.

== Sabiaceae ==
- Meliosma obtusifolia (Bello) Krug & Urb.

== Salicaceae ==
- Banara portoricensis Krug & Urb.
- Banara vanderbiltii Urb.
- Xylosma pachyphylla (Krug & Urb.) Urb. – Spiny logwood
- Xylosma schwaneckeana (Krug & Urb.) Urb.

== Santalaceae ==
- Dendrophthora bermejae Kuijt, Carlo & Aukema

== Sapindaceae ==
- Thouinia striata Radlk.

== Sapotaceae ==
- Micropholis garciniifolia Pierre

== Schizaeaceae ==
- Anemia portoricensis Maxon

== Schoepfiaceae ==
- Schoepfia arenaria Britton

== Selaginellaceae ==
- Selaginella krugii Hieron.
- Selaginella laxifolia Baker

== Simaroubaceae ==
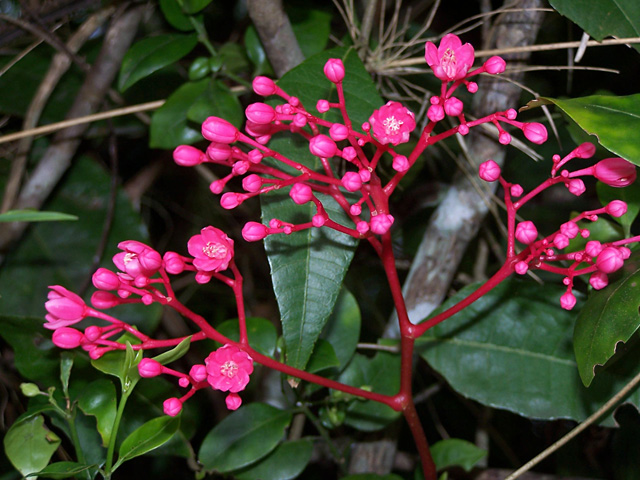
Simarouba tulae

- Simarouba tulae Urb.

== Solanaceae ==
- Brunfelsia densifolia Krug & Urb.
- Brunfelsia lactea Krug & Urb. (eastern Puerto Rico)
- Brunfelsia portoricensis Krug & Urb. (Sierra de Luquilla)
- Goetzea elegans Wydler
- Solanum ensifolium Dunal – Erubia
- Solanum woodburyi R.A.Howard

== Styracaceae ==
- Styrax portoricensis Krug & Urb. – Palo de Jazmin

== Symplocaceae ==
- Symplocos lanata Krug & Urb.
- Symplocos latifolia Krug & Urb.
- Symplocos micrantha Krug & Urb. (eastern Puerto Rico)

== Thymelaeaceae ==
- Daphnopsis helleriana Urb.
- Daphnopsis philippiana Krug & Urb.

== Urticaceae ==
- Pilea krugii Urb.
- Pilea leptophylla Urb.
- Pilea multicaulis Urb.
- Pilea yunquensis (Urb.) Britton & P.Wilson
- Urera chlorocarpa Urb.

== Verbenaceae ==
- Priva portoricensis Urb.
- Stachytarpheta × trimenii Rech. (S. mutabilis × S. urticifolia)

== Zamiaceae ==
- Zamia portoricensis Urb. (Note: Acevedo-Rodriguez, P. and M.T. Strong. 2005. Zamiaceae. In Acevedo-Rodriguez, P. and M.T. Strong (eds.) Monocotyledons and Gymnosperms of Puerto Rico and the Virgin Islands. Contributions from the United States National Herbarium volume 52.)

== See also ==
- Fauna of Puerto Rico
- List of endemic fauna of Puerto Rico
- Grasses of Puerto Rico
- San Juan Botanical Garden
