= C. portoricensis =

C. portoricensis may refer to:

- Caesalpinia portoricensis, a flowering plant
- Calliandra portoricensis, a perennial tree
- Calyptranthes portoricensis, a plant endemic to Puerto Rico
- Canna portoricensis, a garden plant
- Clidemia portoricensis, a flowering plant
- Cnicus portoricensis, a thistle that is widespread in Mexico and the West Indies
- Coccocrater portoricensis, a deepwater limpet
- Colliuris portoricensis, a ground beetle
- Condylostylus portoricensis, a long-legged fly
- Contopus portoricensis, a tyrant flycatcher
- Crescentia portoricensis, a perennial evergreen
- Critonia portoricensis, a flowering plant
- Cyathea portoricensis, a tree fern
- Cyclura portoricensis, a rock iguana
- Cynometra portoricensis, a tropical tree
