= Sebucan =

Sebucan may refer to:

- Sebucán a neighborhood in Caracas, Venezuela
- Sebucan (dance), a traditional dance from Venezuela
- Leptocereus grantianus, a cactus
- Leptocereus quadricostatus, a cactus
- Tapioca
