= E. poeppigii =

E. poeppigii may refer to:

- Epidendrum poeppigii, a neotropical orchid
- Eupatorium poeppigii, a sunflower shrub
- Euphorbia poeppigii, a flowering plant
