= Steyermarkina =

Scientific classification
- Kingdom: Plantae
- Clade: Tracheophytes
- Clade: Angiosperms
- Clade: Eudicots
- Clade: Asterids
- Order: Asterales
- Family: Asteraceae
- Subfamily: Asteroideae
- Tribe: Eupatorieae
- Genus: Steyermarkina; R.M.King & H.Rob

Type species
- Steyermarkina pyrifolia DC.

Synonyms
- Eupatorium sect. Steyermarkina (R.M.King & H.Rob.) Cabrera

Genus of plants

Steyermarkina is a genus of South American plants in the tribe Eupatorieae within the family Asteraceae.

The genus name of Steyermarkina is in honour of Julian Alfred Steyermark (1909–1988), an American botanist.

Species

- Steyermarkina dispalata (Gardner) R.M.King & H.Rob. - Paraná, Minas Gerais, São Paulo, Rio de Janeiro
- Steyermarkina dusenii (Malme) R.M.King & H.Rob. - Paraná, Santa Catarina
- Steyermarkina pyrifolia (DC.) R.M.King & H.Rob. - Bahia, Espírito Santo, Paraná, Santa Catarina, Minas Gerais, São Paulo, Rio de Janeiro
- Steyermarkina triflora R.M.King & H.Rob. - State of Trujillo in western Venezuela

formerly included

see Critonia

- Steyermarkina naiguatensis - Critonia naiguatensis
