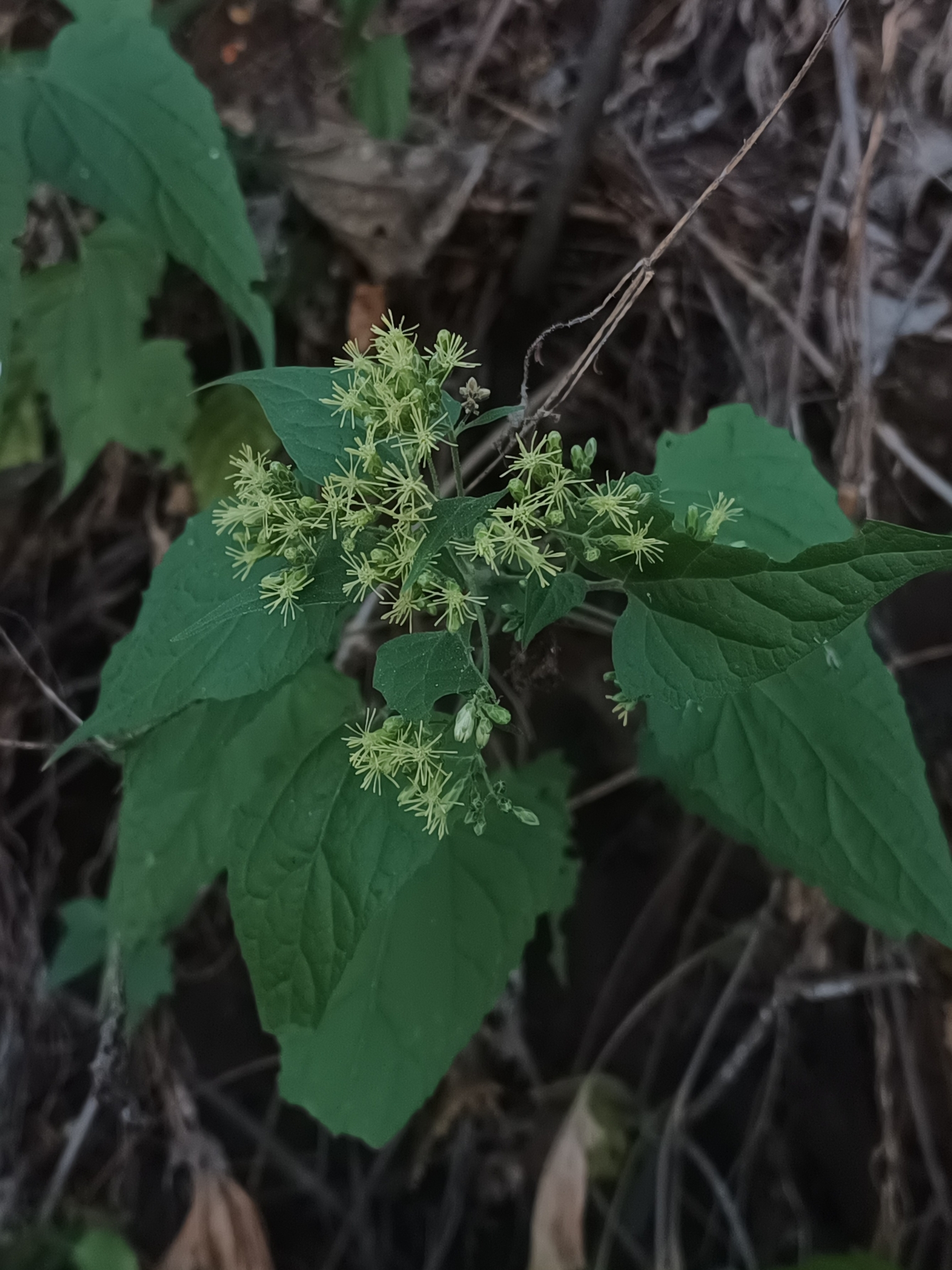
- Kyrsteniopsis nelsonii

Scientific classification
- Kingdom: Plantae
- Clade: Tracheophytes
- Clade: Angiosperms
- Clade: Eudicots
- Clade: Asterids
- Order: Asterales
- Family: Asteraceae
- Subfamily: Asteroideae
- Tribe: Eupatorieae
- Genus: Kyrsteniopsis; R.M.King & H.Rob.

= Kyrsteniopsis =

Genus of flowering plants

Kyrsteniopsis is a genus of Mexican flowering plants in the family Asteraceae.

Species

- Kyrsteniopsis congesta R.M.King & H.Rob. - Guerrero
- Kyrsteniopsis cymulifera (B.L.Rob.) R.M.King & H.Rob. - San Luis Potosí, Guanajuato
- Kyrsteniopsis dibollii R.M.King & H.Rob. - San Luis Potosí, Veracruz, Puebla, Oaxaca
- Kyrsteniopsis nelsonii (B.L.Rob.) R.M.King & H.Rob. - Oaxaca, Chiapas, México State, Jalisco, Michoacán, Guerrero, Colima

formerly included

see Adenocritonia Critonia Pseudokyrsteniopsis

- Kyrsteniopsis eriocarpa (B.L.Rob. & Greenm.) B.L.Turner - Critonia eriocarpa (B.L.Rob. & Greenm.) R.M.King & H.Rob.
- Kyrsteniopsis heathiae (B.L.Turner) B.L.Turner - Adenocritonia heathiae (B.L.Turner) R.M.King & H.Rob.
- Kyrsteniopsis iltisii (R.M.King & H.Rob.) B.L.Turner- Critonia iltisii R.M.King & H.Rob.
- Kyrsteniopsis perpetiolata (R.M.King & H.Rob.) B.L.Turner - Pseudokyrsteniopsis perpetiolata R.M.King & H.Rob.
- Kyrsteniopsis spinaciifolia (DC.) B.L.Turner - Critonia spinaciifolia (DC.) R.M.King & H.Rob.
