= Leptocereus paniculatus =

Conservation status
- Vulnerable (IUCN 3.1)

Scientific classification
- Kingdom: Plantae
- Clade: Tracheophytes
- Clade: Angiosperms
- Clade: Eudicots
- Order: Caryophyllales
- Family: Cactaceae
- Subfamily: Cactoideae
- Genus: Leptocereus
- Species: L. paniculatus

Binomial name
- Leptocereus paniculatus (Lam.) D.R.Hunt

Synonyms
- Cactus paniculatus Lam. (basionym); Cereus paniculatus (Lam.) DC.; Neoabbottia paniculata (Lam.) Britton & Rose; Neoabbottia paniculata var. humbertii Backeb.

Species of plant

Leptocereus paniculatus, commonly known in Spanish as cagüey, is a species of succulent flowering plant in the genus Leptocereus, within the family Cactaceae. It is endemic to the island of Hispaniola, which is shared between Haiti and the Dominican Republic. It is the only species in its genus that forms large, dense populations.

== Description ==
Leptocereus paniculatus is a species of treelike cactus that reaches 6 to 10 meters in height. It develops a well-defined woody trunk, which measures 2 to 4 meters in height and 30 to 40 cm in diameter on an adult plant, with brown bark. In some specimens, the spines are absent; when present, they are grouped densely together, forming sets of robust spines measuring 5 to 10 cm in length, which emerge from large areoles that measure approximately 1.2 cm in diameter. The branches also become woody with age and appear similar to the trunk, albeit with a smaller diameter.

Ribs and spines

The segments at the ends of the stems are green-gray in color and measure up to 30 to 50 cm in length and up to 6 to 10 cm in diameter. The stem develops 4 to 6 ribs, measuring 2 to 3 cm in height and 1 to 1.5 cm in width at the base, which is extended to a rounded apex approximately 5 mm in width. The margins are crenate and exhibit 2 to 3 mm of height difference between the upper and lower parts. On the ribs are ovoid areoles, which measure approximately 3 mm in length and 4 mm in width, and have a white felt-like covering. These areoles appear on the lower part of the ribs' undulations and are separated by a distance of 2 to 2.5 cm. Each areole has 15 to 25 spines (or occasionally up to 30), which vary from 0.5 to 2 cm in length, sometimes up to 3 cm. The spines are yellow-brown in color when young; they become an ashy gray color with age. They are straight, needle-shaped, and extended, with no differentiation between central and radial spines.

This species produces terminal brachyblasts, which resemble a cephalium. They are cylindrical in shape and reach 7 to 8 cm in length and approximately 2 cm in diameter. They have numerous densely-spaced, spineless areoles covered with creamy white felt. With age, they become woody, and the felt remains only on the younger areoles.

The flowers open at night and generally appear solitarily or in small groups of 2 to 4 on the terminal brachyblasts. They reach approximately 5 cm in length and 1.5 cm in diameter. The pericarpel measures approximately 1.8 cm in length and 1.2 cm in width; it is green in color. The hypanthium reaches approximately 3 cm in length and 1.5 cm in width at the margins; its walls are approximately 4 mm thick. It is green in color, and has slightly prominent ribs. The floral tube has podaria that are crowned with small, reddish-green scales and small areoles with light brown felt. Some of these areoles develop 2 to 3 short, hair-like spines measuring up to 2 mm in length. The nectar chamber measures approximately 1 cm in length and 8 mm in width.

Fruits

The style is white in color and measures approximately 2.2 cm in length and 1.5 mm in diameter. The stigma develops 10 to 12 lobes that measure up to 6 mm in length. The stamens are numerous and white, and reach approximately 1.2 cm in length within the floral tube and up to 4 mm on the margin thereof. The anthers are cream-colored and measure approximately 1 mm in length. The tepals are recurved during anthesis; they are creamy white in color and are approximately 20 in number. They measure 6 to 8 mm in length and 2 to 3 mm in width.

The fruit is ovoid to globose in shape, and reaches 6 to 7 cm in length and 5 to 5.5 cm in width. The pericarpel is largely smooth, although it exhibits a few tubercles at both of its ends. It is green or reddish-green in color and contains a very firm pulp, up to 1 cm thick. On the surface are spread-out areoles, which measure approximately 2 mm in diameter and are separated by a distance of up to 2 cm; these have white or light brown felt. The spines are scarce, narrow, and small, measuring up to 4 mm in length, although they are often absent altogether. The dry flower remnants stay attached to the mature fruit; they are black in color and measure approximately 1.5 cm in length that 1.2 cm in width.

The seeds are immersed in a highly mucilaginous pulp. They are oval in shape, appearing somewhat flattened; they are matte black in color. They measure 2.2 to 2.4 mm in length, approximately 1.2 mm in width, and approximately 0.8 mm thick. The testa has large cells, which bulge greatly and have pointed apices. The cells on the border of the hilo-micropylar region are smaller and flatter. They hilum is oblique; it measures approximately 1 mm in length and 0.3 mm in width, and has a brown margin.

=== Similar species ===
This species is commonly confused with Leptocereus bayahibensis, due to the fact that both species are treelike in form and share various traits of their flowers and fruits. In both species, the hypanthium lacks spines (or has very short and weak spines). Furthermore, the tepals are small, strongly recurved, and barely standing out from the top of the floral tube. The fruits also have highly reduced spines.

However, L. bayahibensis may be easily distinguished by its thinner stems, which measure 2.5 to 4 cm in diameter, as opposed to those of L. paniculatus, which measure 6 to 10 cm in diameter. It is also shorter, growing to only 2 to 5 meters while L. paniculatus reaches 6 to 10 meters. Furthermore, the species differ in theit distribution and habitat: L. bayahibensis grows approximately 200 km to the east of the nearest populations of L. paniculatus and inhabits more humid environments with denser vegetation. The region between the distributions of the species does not provide adequate conditions for either of their growth.

== Distribution and habitat ==
Leptocereus paniculatus is endemic to the island of Hispaniola, which is shared between Haiti and the Dominican Republic. It is found from Port-au-Prince in the west across the Cul-de-Sac Plain to the Neiba Valley, which is situated approximately 20 km west of Azua, in the southern Dominican Republic.

It inhabits the seasonally-dry tropical biome at altitudes of 0 to 220 meters above sea level. Although one individual has been found at an altitude of 620 meters in Sierra Martín García National Park, this case is an exception.

It grows in semiarid environments in spiny xerophilic forests dominated by shrubs and small trees, as well as in open areas with sparse vegetation.

== Taxonomy ==
This species was first described as Cactus paniculatus, a name published in 1785 by the French botanist Jean-Baptiste Lamarck in his book Encyclopédie Méthodique, Botanique 1: 540.

Later, the British botanist David Richard Hunt transferred the species to the genus Leptocereus, renaming it Leptocereus paniculatus. He registered these changes in the scientific journal Bradleya 9: 89, published in 1991.

Etymology

- Leptocereus: the genus name is derived from the Greek word leptos (meaning "fine" or "thin") and the Latin word cereus (meaning "candle"), in reference to the fine ribs present on the long, straight stems of the species in this genus.
- paniculatus: the specific epithet is derived from the Latin word paniculatus (meaning "paniculate"), in reference to the manner in which this species branches.

== Conservation status ==
On the IUCN Red List, Leptocereus paniculatus is classified as being Vulnerable (VU), due to the fact that there are currently less than 10,000 mature individuals, with a negative population trend. This category reflects the high risk of this species' extinction in the wild if current threats persist or change.

The principal threats are the extraction of limestone, livestock grazing, and habitat loss. Furthermore, most of the original spiny forest has been destroyed for charcoal production, significantly reducing the vegetative cover of the region. However, L. paniculatus plants are often spared, since their wood is not considered adequate for charcoal. For this reason, the species survives even in zones where its original habitat has disappeared.

Although mature plants show some resistance to environmental destruction, the loss of surrounding shrubs and trees makes it difficult for seedlings to establish by exposing them to direct, intense sunlight. This hinders the natural regeneration of populations.

== Cultivation ==
This species is primarily cultivated as an ornamental. It may be propagated via cuttings.

== Gallery ==
In habitat in Independencia Province, Dominican Republic

Treelike growth form

Stems

Stems

Stem with fruits
