= Zapoteca sousae =

Scientific classification
- Kingdom: Plantae
- Clade: Tracheophytes
- Clade: Angiosperms
- Clade: Eudicots
- Clade: Rosids
- Order: Fabales
- Family: Fabaceae
- Subfamily: Caesalpinioideae
- Clade: Mimosoid clade
- Genus: Zapoteca
- Species: Z. sousae

Binomial name
- Zapoteca sousae H.M. Hern. & A. Campos V.

Species of legume

Zapoteca sousae is a plant species native the Mexican States of Oaxaca and Colima. It tends to grow in undisturbed ravines in mountainous areas at elevations of approximately 1500 m (5000 feet).

Zapoteca sousae is a shrub or small tree up to 3 m tall. Leaves are up to 7 cm long including the rachis, bipinnately compound, with as many as 33 pairs of leaflets per pinna. Flower heads are borne in the axils of the leaves, the flowers greenish-white. Pods are dehiscent, up to 12 cm long when mature, containing dark brown, mottled seeds.
