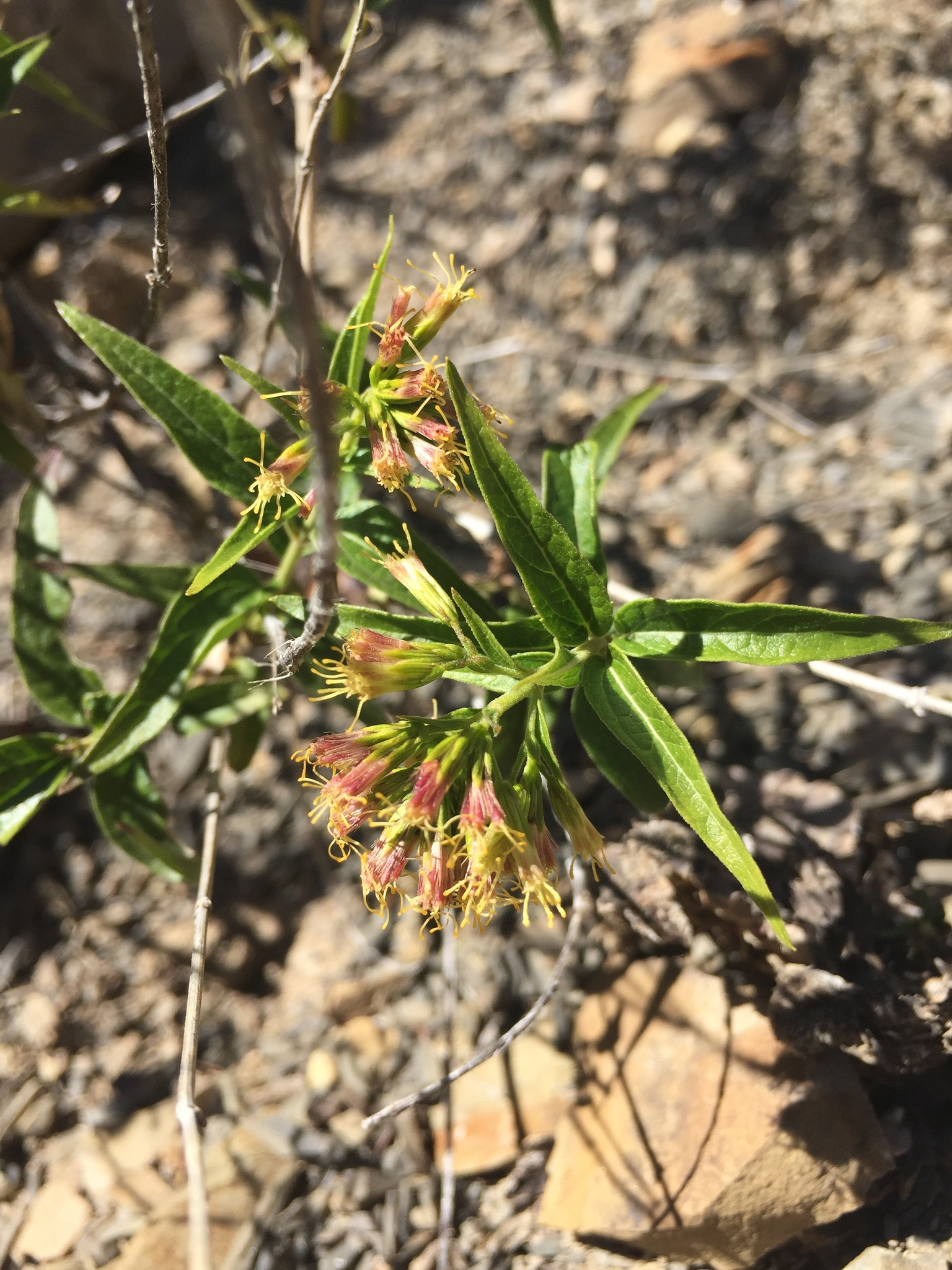

Scientific classification
- Kingdom: Plantae
- Clade: Tracheophytes
- Clade: Angiosperms
- Clade: Eudicots
- Clade: Asterids
- Order: Asterales
- Family: Asteraceae
- Genus: Koanophyllon
- Species: K. solidaginifolium

Binomial name
- Koanophyllon solidaginifolium (A.Gray) R.M.King & H.Rob. 1971

Synonyms
- Eupatorium solidaginifolium A. Gray 1852; Koanophyllon solidaginifolia (A. Gray) R.M. King & H. Rob

= Koanophyllon solidaginifolium =

Species of flowering plant

Koanophyllon solidaginifolium, the shrubby umbrella thoroughwort, is a plant species native to Arizona, western Texas, New Mexico, Chihuahua, Coahuila, Durango, Jalisco, and Zacatecas. It grows primarily on canyon walls, ledges, and other stony outcrops.

Koanophyllon solidaginifolium is an herb or subshrub up to 100 cm (39 inches) in height. Leaves are lanceolate with rounded bases and narrow pointed tips. Flowers are usually white, but sometimes tinged with purple or yellow.
