= Auerodendron northropianum =

Conservation status
- Least Concern (IUCN 3.1)

Scientific classification
- Kingdom: Plantae
- Clade: Tracheophytes
- Clade: Angiosperms
- Clade: Eudicots
- Clade: Rosids
- Order: Rosales
- Family: Rhamnaceae
- Genus: Auerodendron
- Species: A. northropianum

Binomial name
- Auerodendron northropianum (Urb.) Urb.

Synonyms
- Reynosia northropiana Urb.

Species of flowering plant

Auerodendron northropianum is a plant species of the family Rhamnaceae. It is a shrub or tree native to the Bahamas and Cuba in the Caribbean. There are large populations throughout the Bahamas, and it is known from a single location in northeastern Cuba. It usually grows in coastal dry forests and shrublands up to 40 metres elevation.

Its habit is a shrub and it has simple leaves. The leaflets are pinnate and alternate of each other. The plant is also perennial meaning it persists from year to year the year even in unfavorable conditions. Since it is found in the forests along the coast insects and small animals help to pollinate and disperse the seeds of the plant. The plant is not widely known or abundant in its numbers so it is not widely cultivated or used medicinally.

The species was first described as Reynosia northropiana by Ignatz Urban in 1902. In 1924 Urban placed the species in genus Auerodendron as A. northropianum.
