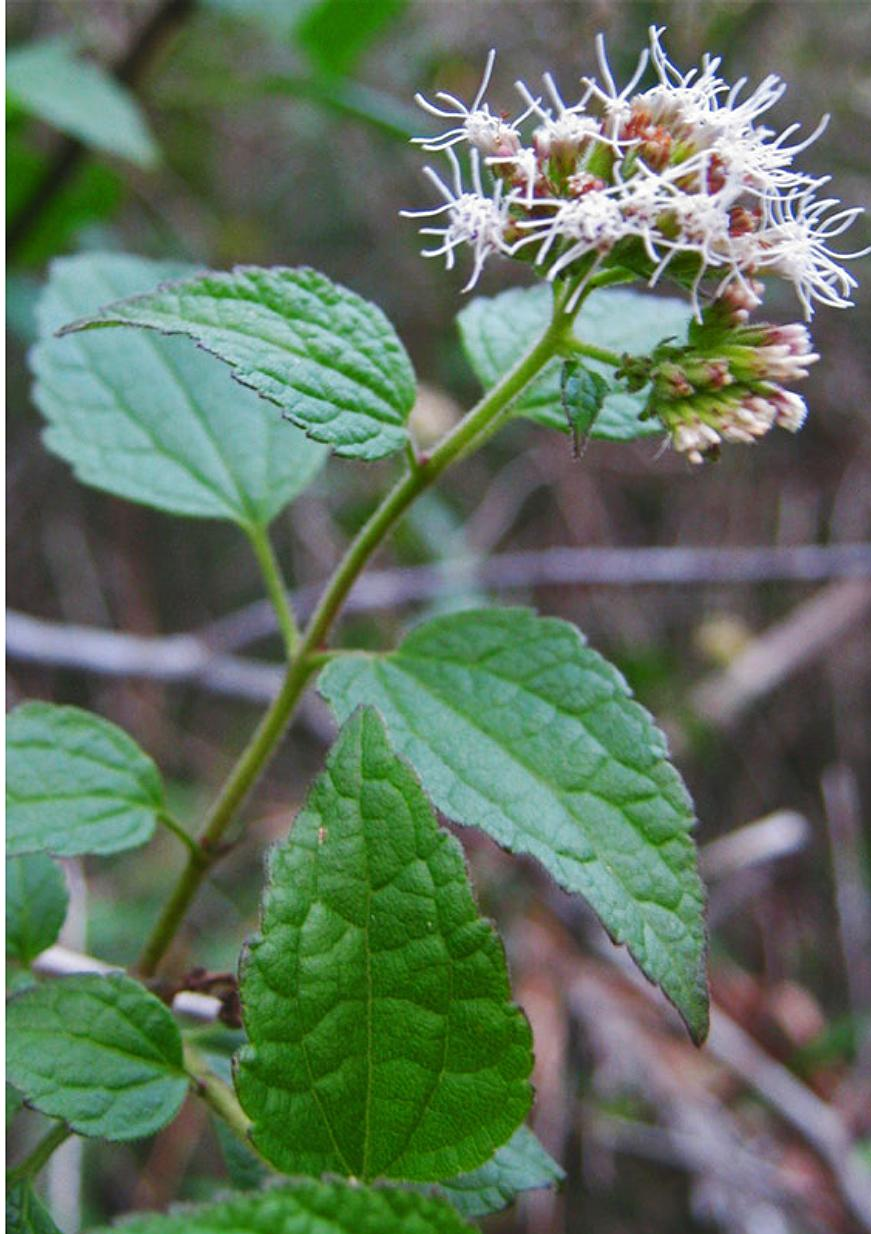
- Koanophyllon conglobatum

Scientific classification
- Kingdom: Plantae
- Clade: Tracheophytes
- Clade: Angiosperms
- Clade: Eudicots
- Clade: Asterids
- Order: Asterales
- Family: Asteraceae
- Subfamily: Asteroideae
- Tribe: Eupatorieae
- Genus: Koanophyllon; Arruda 1816

Type species
- Koanophyllon tinctorium Arruda

= Koanophyllon =

Genus of flowering plants

Koanophyllon is a genus of plants in the family Asteraceae. They are perennials and shrubs (rarely vines or trees) and are native to South America, Central America, the West Indies, Mexico, with a few species range extending into the United States. The flowers are white to pinkish (rarely purple).

Cuba alone has 21 endemic species, seven of which only grow in serpentine soils, and some of which accumulate minerals such as nickel and manganese.

Species

- Koanophyllon adamantium - Brazil
- Koanophyllon albicaulis - from Tamaulipas to Honduras
- Koanophyllon andersonii - Goiás
- Koanophyllon atroglandulosum - Cuba
- Koanophyllon ayapanoides - Cuba
- Koanophyllon baccharifolium - State of Rio de Janeiro
- Koanophyllon barahonense - Hispaniola
- Koanophyllon breviflorum - Cuba
- Koanophyllon bullescens - Cuba
- Koanophyllon cabaionum - Haiti
- Koanophyllon calcicola - Hispaniola
- Koanophyllon celtidifolia - Jamaica, Venezuela, Colombia, Ecuador
- Koanophyllon chabrense - Haiti
- Koanophyllon chalceorithales - Cuba
- Koanophyllon clementis - Cuba
- Koanophyllon coixtlahuacum - Oaxaca
- Koanophyllon concordianum - Sinaloa
- Koanophyllon conglobatum - Brazil
- Koanophyllon consanguineum - southern Brazil
- Koanophyllon constanzae - Dominican Republic
- Koanophyllon correlliorum - Bahamas
- Koanophyllon coulteri - Central America
- Koanophyllon delpechianum - Haiti
- Koanophyllon dolicholepis - Puerto Rico
- Koanophyllon dolphinii - Jamaica
- Koanophyllon droserolepis - Puerto Rico
- Koanophyllon dukei - Panamá
- Koanophyllon eitenii - Goiás
- Koanophyllon ekmanii - Cuba
- Koanophyllon flavidulum - Haiti
- Koanophyllon flexilis - Peru
- Koanophyllon fuscum - Venezuela, Guyana
- Koanophyllon gabbii - Hispaniola
- Koanophyllon galeanum - Nuevo León
- Koanophyllon galeottii - from Veracruz to Nicaragua
- Koanophyllon gibbosum - Hispaniola
- Koanophyllon gracilicaule - Mexico
- Koanophyllon gracilipes - Jamaica
- Koanophyllon grandiceps - Cuba
- Koanophyllon grisebachianum - Dominican Republic, Cuba
- Koanophyllon guerreroanum - Guerrero
- Koanophyllon gundlachii - Cuba
- Koanophyllon hammatocladum - Jamaica
- Koanophyllon hardwarense - Jamaica
- Koanophyllon helianthemoides - Cuba
- Koanophyllon heptaneurum - Dominican Republic
- Koanophyllon hidrodes - Cuba
- Koanophyllon hintoniorum - Nuevo León
- Koanophyllon hondurense - Honduras
- Koanophyllon hotteanum - Haiti
- Koanophyllon huantae - Peru
- Koanophyllon hylonoma - Central America
- Koanophyllon hypomalacum - Guatemala
- Koanophyllon isillumense - Peru
- Koanophyllon iteophyllum - Haiti
- Koanophyllon jaegerianum - Haiti
- Koanophyllon jenssenii - Haiti
- Koanophyllon jugipaniculatum - Bolivia
- Koanophyllon juninense - Peru
- Koanophyllon kavanayense - Venezuela
- Koanophyllon littorale - Cuba
- Koanophyllon lobatifolia - Brazil
- Koanophyllon longifolia - Nuevo León, Tamaulipas
- Koanophyllon maestrense - Cuba
- Koanophyllon mesoreopolum - Colombia
- Koanophyllon microchaeteum - Hispaniola
- Koanophyllon mimicum - Guatemala
- Koanophyllon minutifolium - Cuba
- Koanophyllon miragoanae - Haiti
- Koanophyllon montanum - Jamaica
- Koanophyllon mornicola - Haiti
- Koanophyllon muricatum - Cuba
- Koanophyllon myrtilloides - Brazil
- Koanophyllon nervosum - Hispaniola
- Koanophyllon nudiflorum - Cuba
- Koanophyllon obtusissimum - Dominican Republic
- Koanophyllon oligadenium - Cuba
- Koanophyllon pachyneurum - Hispaniola
- Koanophyllon palmeri - Arizona, New Mexico, Mexico, Brazil
- Koanophyllon panamense - Panamá
- Koanophyllon paucicrenatum - Hispaniola
- Koanophyllon phanioides - Haiti
- Koanophyllon picardae - Haiti
- Koanophyllon pitonianum - Haiti
- Koanophyllon pittieri - from Tabasco to Panama
- Koanophyllon polyodon - Puerto Rico
- Koanophyllon polystictum - Cuba
- Koanophyllon porphyrocladum - Haiti
- Koanophyllon prinodes - Cuba
- Koanophyllon pseudoperfoliatum - Veracruz
- Koanophyllon puberulum - Hispaniola
- Koanophyllon quisqueyanum - Dominican Republic
- Koanophyllon ravenii - Chiapas
- Koanophyllon revealii - Oaxaca
- Koanophyllon reversum - Haiti
- Koanophyllon rhexioides - Cuba
- Koanophyllon rubroviolaceum - Haiti
- Koanophyllon rzedowskii - San Luis Potosí
- Koanophyllon sagasteguii - Peru
- Koanophyllon scabriusculum - Haiti
- Koanophyllon sciatraphes - Venezuela, Hispaniola
- Koanophyllon selleanum - Haiti
- Koanophyllon semicrenatum - Hispaniola
- Koanophyllon silvaticum - Cuba
- Koanophyllon simile - Jamaica
- Koanophyllon simillima - Paraguay, Bolivia, Argentina
- Koanophyllon sinaloense - Sinaloa
- Koanophyllon solidaginifolium - Arizona, New Mexico, Texas, northeastern Mexico
- Koanophyllon solidaginoides - Galápagos, from Tabasco to Peru
- Koanophyllon stipulifera - Bolivia, Argentina
- Koanophyllon subpurpureum - Dominican Republic
- Koanophyllon tapeinanthum - Haiti
- Koanophyllon tatei - Venezuela
- Koanophyllon tetranfolium - Jamaica
- Koanophyllon tetranthum - Jamaica
- Koanophyllon thysanolepis - S Brazil
- Koanophyllon tinctorium - S Brazil
- Koanophyllon tricephalotes - Minas Gerais
- Koanophyllon tripartitum - Chiapas
- Koanophyllon triradiatum - Haiti
- Koanophyllon turquinense - Cuba
- Koanophyllon villosum - Florida, Greater Antilles
- Koanophyllon wetmorei - Panamá, Costa Rica
