= Critonia eggersii =

Conservation status
- Vulnerable (IUCN 3.1)

Scientific classification
- Kingdom: Plantae
- Clade: Tracheophytes
- Clade: Angiosperms
- Clade: Eudicots
- Clade: Asterids
- Order: Asterales
- Family: Asteraceae
- Genus: Critonia
- Species: C. eggersii

Binomial name
- Critonia eggersii (Hieron.) R.M.King & H.Rob.

Species of flowering plant

Critonia eggersii is a species of flowering plant in the family Asteraceae. It is found in Ecuador. Its natural habitat is subtropical or tropical moist lowland forests. It is threatened by habitat loss.
