= Zapoteca aculeata =

Conservation status
- Endangered (IUCN 3.1)

Scientific classification
- Kingdom: Plantae
- Clade: Tracheophytes
- Clade: Angiosperms
- Clade: Eudicots
- Clade: Rosids
- Order: Fabales
- Family: Fabaceae
- Subfamily: Caesalpinioideae
- Clade: Mimosoid clade
- Genus: Zapoteca
- Species: Z. aculeata

Binomial name
- Zapoteca aculeata (Spruce ex Benth.) H.M.Hern.

Species of legume

Zapoteca aculeata is a species of flowering plant in the family Fabaceae, that is endemic to Tungurahua, Ecuador. Its natural habitat is subtropical or tropical moist montane forests.
