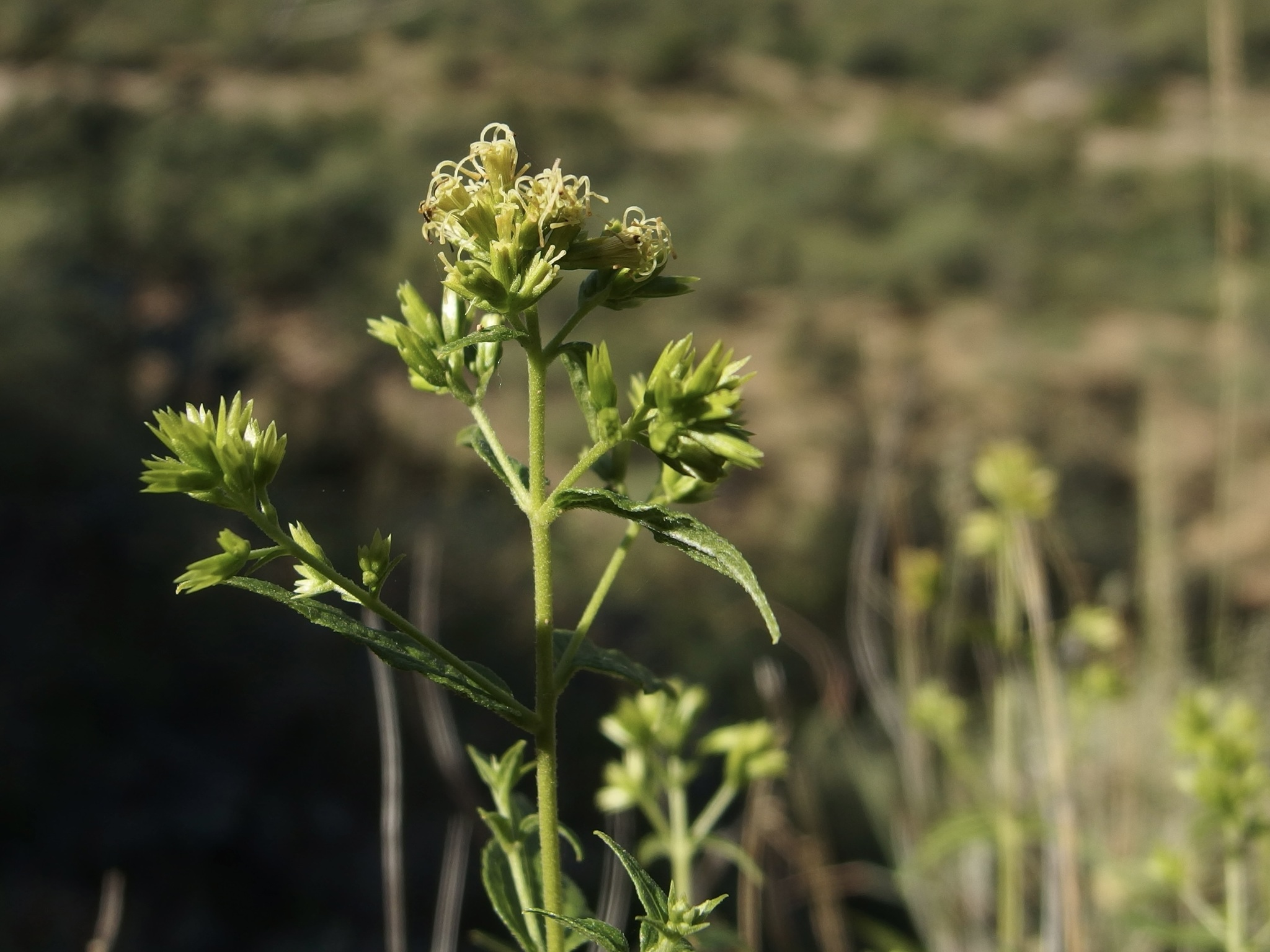

Scientific classification
- Kingdom: Plantae
- Clade: Tracheophytes
- Clade: Angiosperms
- Clade: Eudicots
- Clade: Asterids
- Order: Asterales
- Family: Asteraceae
- Genus: Koanophyllon
- Species: K. palmeri

Binomial name
- Koanophyllon palmeri (A.Gray) R.M.King & H.Rob. 1971

Synonyms
- Eupatorium palmeri A. Gray 1886; Eupatorium arborescens M.E.Jones

= Koanophyllon palmeri =

Species of flowering plant

Koanophyllon palmeri, called Palmer’s umbrella thoroughwort, is a North American plant species in the family Asteraceae. It is native to Arizona, southwestern New Mexico, and western Mexico from Sonora as far south as Michoacán.

Koanophyllon palmeri is an herb or subshrub up to 100 cm (39 inches) in height. Leaves are lanceolate with rounded bases and narrow pointed tips. Flowers are usually white, but sometimes tinged with purple or yellow.
