= Auerodendron =

Scientific classification
- Kingdom: Plantae
- Clade: Tracheophytes
- Clade: Angiosperms
- Clade: Eudicots
- Clade: Rosids
- Order: Rosales
- Family: Rhamnaceae
- Tribe: Rhamneae
- Genus: Auerodendron; Urb.

Genus of flowering plants

Auerodendron is a genus of plant in family Rhamnaceae.

Species include:

- Auerodendron acuminatum (Griseb.) Urb.
- Auerodendron acunae Borhidi & O.Muñiz
- Auerodendron cubense (Britton & N.Wilson) Urb.
- Auerodendron glaucescens Urb.
- Auerodendron jamaicense (Urb.) Urb.
- Auerodendron martii Alain
- Auerodendron northropianum Urb.
- Auerodendron pauciflorum Alain
- Auerodendron reticulatum (Griseb.) Urb.
- Auerodendron truncatum Urb.
