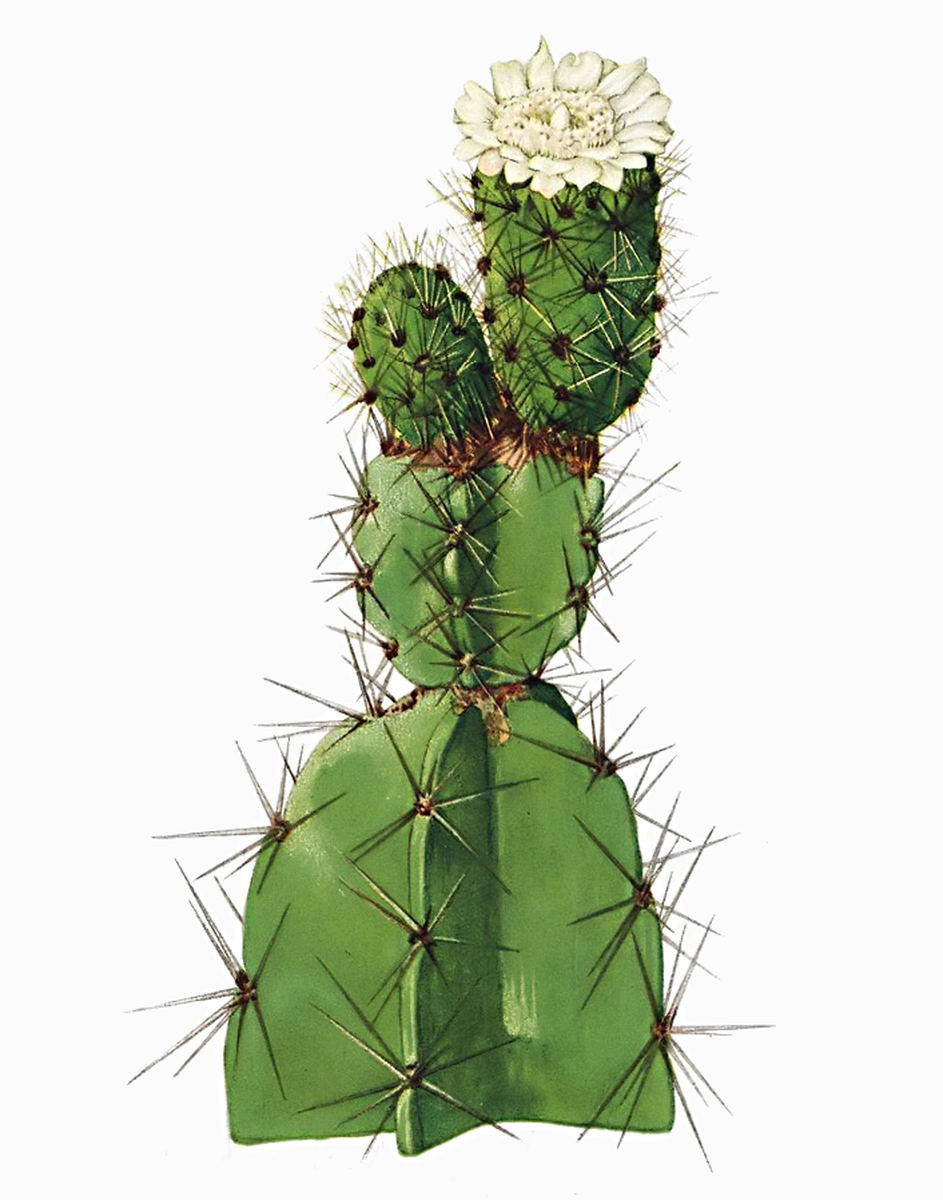
- Leptocereus arboreus

Scientific classification
- Kingdom: Plantae
- Clade: Tracheophytes
- Clade: Angiosperms
- Clade: Eudicots
- Order: Caryophyllales
- Family: Cactaceae
- Subfamily: Cactoideae
- Tribe: incertae sedis
- Genus: Leptocereus (A.Berger) Britton & Rose

Type species
- Leptocereus assurgens

Synonyms
- Cereus subg. Leptocereus A.Berger; Neoabbottia Britton & Rose

= Leptocereus =

Genus of cacti

Leptocereus is a genus of cacti that are native to the Greater Antilles. It has been placed in the tribe Leptocereeae or in a broadly defined Echinocereeae.

== Description ==
It is a very rare plant to encounter. The plants themselves are mostly sprawling shrubs, but can also form trees up to 30 feet or more in height. The stems are highly angled; with few large ribs which bear comfortably-spaced areoles that have spine clusters of about 10 spines or so. Some lose spine as they age. Often, the flowers are white or whitish-green and bear spines on raised areoles.

== Species ==
As of September 2026, Plants of the World Online accepted the following species:

Subgenus	Image	Scientific name	Distribution
Dendrocereus		Leptocereus nudiflorus (Engelm. ex C.Wright) D.Barrios & S.Arias	Cuba
Dendrocereus		Leptocereus undulosus(DC.) D.Barrios & Majure	Hispaniola
Leptocereus		Leptocereus arboreus Britton & Rose	Santa Clara, Cuba.
Leptocereus		Leptocereus assurgens (C.Wright ex Griseb.) Britton & Rose	Cuba
Leptocereus		Leptocereus carinatus Areces	Cuba
Leptocereus		Leptocereus gonzaleztorresii D.Barrios	Cuba
Leptocereus		Leptocereus leonii Britton & Rose	Cuba
Leptocereus		Leptocereus scopulophilus Areces	La Habana, Cuba.
Leptocereus		Leptocereus sylvestris Britton & Rose	La Habana, Cuba.
Leptocereus		Leptocereus wrightii León	Cuba
Neoabbotia		Leptocereus bayahibensis Hoxey & Gdaniec	Dominican republic
Neoabbotia		Leptocereus cremnophilus Hoxey & Gdaniec	Dominican republic
Neoabbotia		Leptocereus demissus Areces	southwestern Hispaniola
Neoabbotia		Leptocereus grantianus Britton	Puerto Rico
Neoabbotia		Leptocereus paniculatus (Lam.) D.R.Hunt	Hispaniola
Neoabbotia		Leptocereus quadricostatus (Bello) Britton & Rose	Puerto Rico
Neoabbotia		Leptocereus rosei Hoxey & Gdaniec	Dominican republic
Neoabbotia		Leptocereus septentrionalis Hoxey & Gdaniec	Dominican republic
Neoabbotia		Leptocereus velozianus Clase, Y.Encarn., Peguero & Majure	Hispaniola
Neoabbotia		Leptocereus weingartianus (E.Hartmann) Britton & Rose	Hispaniola
