= Koanophyllon panamense =

Conservation status
- Least Concern (IUCN 3.1)

Scientific classification
- Kingdom: Plantae
- Clade: Tracheophytes
- Clade: Angiosperms
- Clade: Eudicots
- Clade: Asterids
- Order: Asterales
- Family: Asteraceae
- Genus: Koanophyllon
- Species: K. panamense

Binomial name
- Koanophyllon panamense R.M.King & H.Rob. 1974

Synonyms
- Koanophyllon panamensis R.M.King & H.Rob.

Species of flowering plant

Koanophyllon panamense is a species of flowering plant in the family Asteraceae. It is found only in Panama. It is threatened by habitat loss.
