= Koanophyllon sinaloense =

Scientific classification
- Kingdom: Plantae
- Clade: Tracheophytes
- Clade: Angiosperms
- Clade: Eudicots
- Clade: Asterids
- Order: Asterales
- Family: Asteraceae
- Genus: Koanophyllon
- Species: K. sinaloense

Binomial name
- Koanophyllon sinaloense B.L.Turner 1987

Synonyms
- Koanophyllon sinaloensis B.L.Turner

Species of flowering plant

Koanophyllon sinaloense is a species of flowering plant in the family Asteraceae. It is found only in the States of Sonora and Sinaloa in northwestern Mexico.

Koanophyllon sinaloense is a shrub up to 2 meters (80 inches or almost 7 feet) tall. One plant will produce many small flower heads in a flat-topped array, each head with 13-19 white or pale lavender disc flowers but no ray flowers.
