= Auerodendron jamaicense =

Conservation status
- Vulnerable (IUCN 2.3)

Scientific classification
- Kingdom: Plantae
- Clade: Tracheophytes
- Clade: Angiosperms
- Clade: Eudicots
- Clade: Rosids
- Order: Rosales
- Family: Rhamnaceae
- Genus: Auerodendron
- Species: A. jamaicense

Binomial name
- Auerodendron jamaicense (Urb.) Urb.

Synonyms
- Rhamnidium jamaicense Urb.

Species of flowering plant

Auerodendron jamaicense is a species of flowering plant in the family Rhamnaceae. It is a shrub endemic to Jamaica. It grows in coastal woodlands on limestone and sand dunes.
