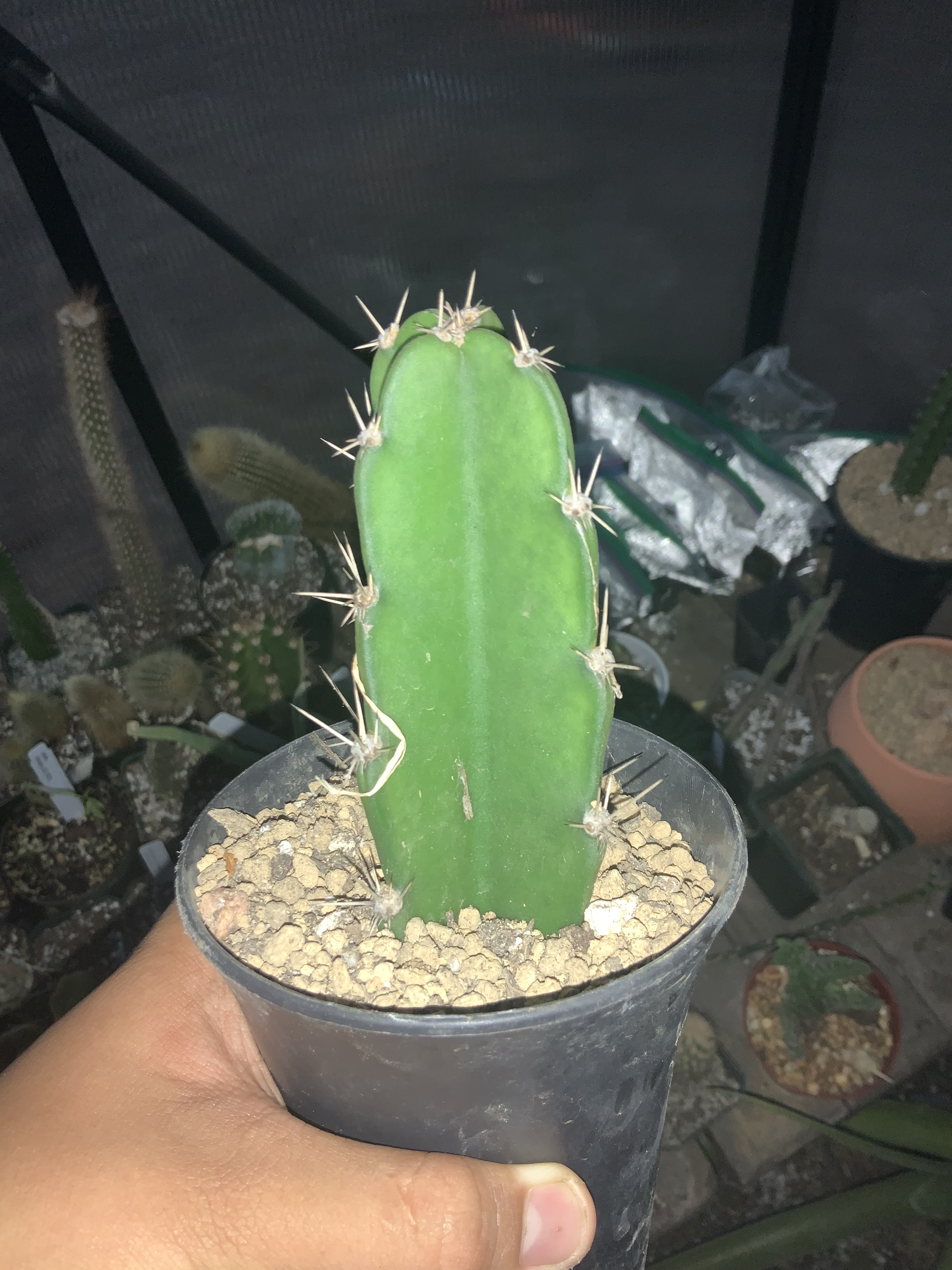
- Rooted plant of Leptocereus nudiflorus

Conservation status
- Endangered (IUCN 3.1)

Scientific classification
- Kingdom: Plantae
- Clade: Tracheophytes
- Clade: Angiosperms
- Clade: Eudicots
- Order: Caryophyllales
- Family: Cactaceae
- Subfamily: Cactoideae
- Genus: Leptocereus
- Species: L. nudiflorus

Binomial name
- Leptocereus nudiflorus (Engelm. ex C.Wright) D.Barrios & S.Arias

Synonyms
- Cereus nudiflorus Engelm. 1869; Dendrocereus nudiflorus (Engelm. ex C.Wright) Britton & Rose 1920; Dendrocereus undulosus subsp. nudiflorus (Engelm. ex C.Wright) Guiggi 2020

= Leptocereus nudiflorus =

Species of cactus

Leptocereus nudiflorus is a species of cactus that is native to Cuba. Common names include Flor De Copa and Goblet flower.

== Description ==
Leptocereus nudiflorus is a tree-like cactus that branches extensively and can grow 7 to 15 meters tall. It is considered one of the largest cacti in the world. Its trunk, up to 1 meter high and 60 centimeters thick, supports short, dull green stem segments that are up to 16 centimeters in diameter. The stem segments feature 3 to 5 wing-like ribs, each up to 7 centimeters high and notched. Spines, which may be absent, are needle-like, gray with darker tips, and measure up to 4 centimeters long. The cactus produces broadly funnel-shaped white flowers, 10 to 12 centimeters long, with a narrow floral tube. Its fruits are typically spherical, greenish, smooth, and range from 8 to 12 centimeters in length.

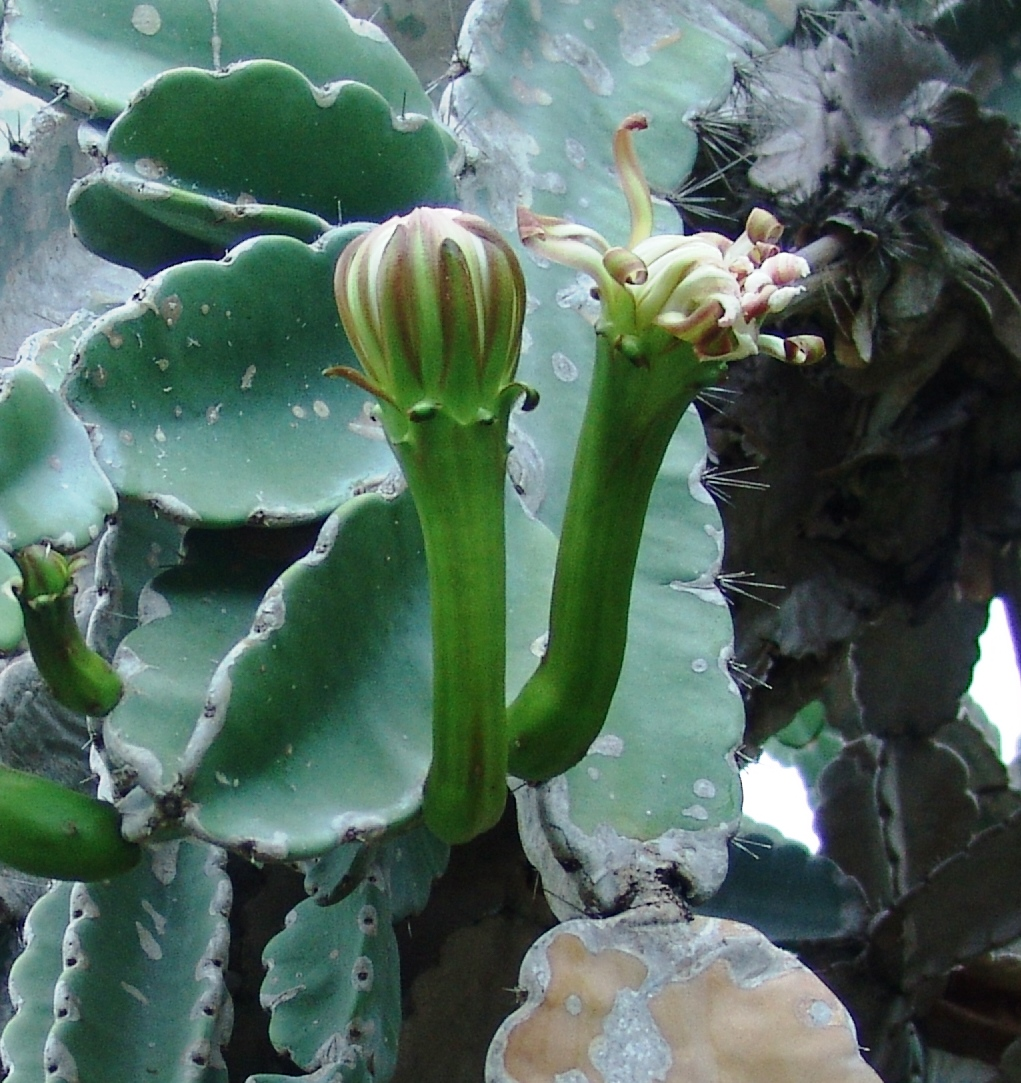
Flowers

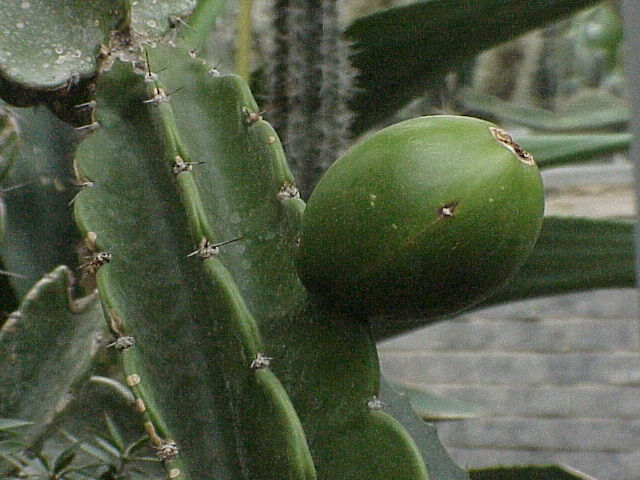
Fruit

== Distribution ==
Leptocereus nudiflorus is found growing in Cuba on the northern coast of Cojimar, Tarará, and Maisi. It inhabits dry and rocky coastal areas.

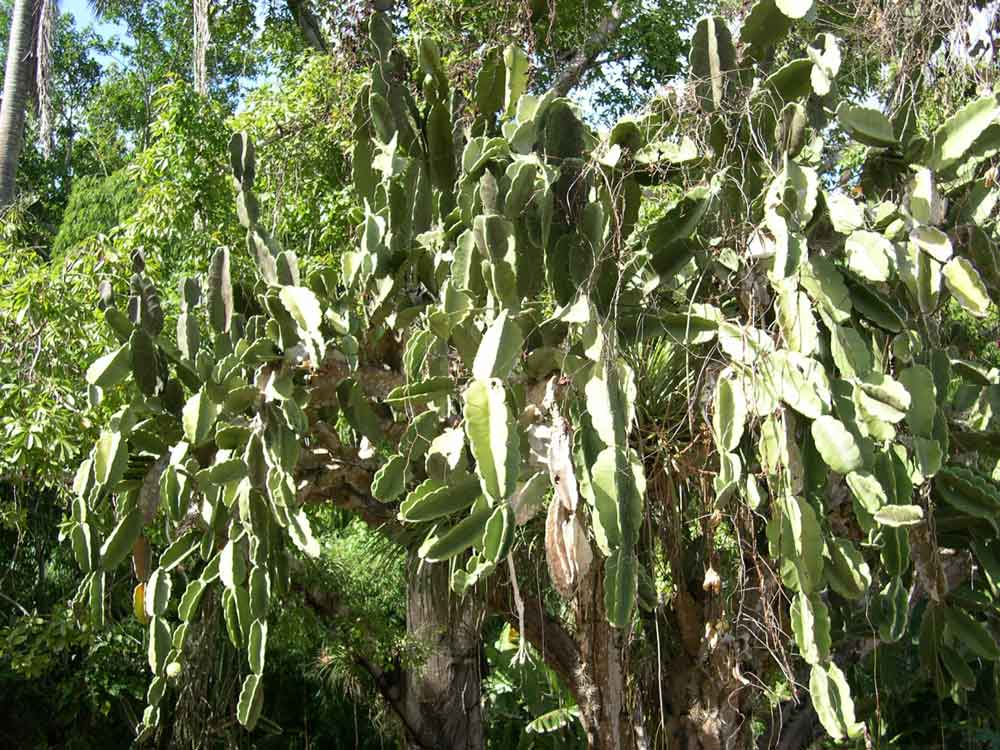

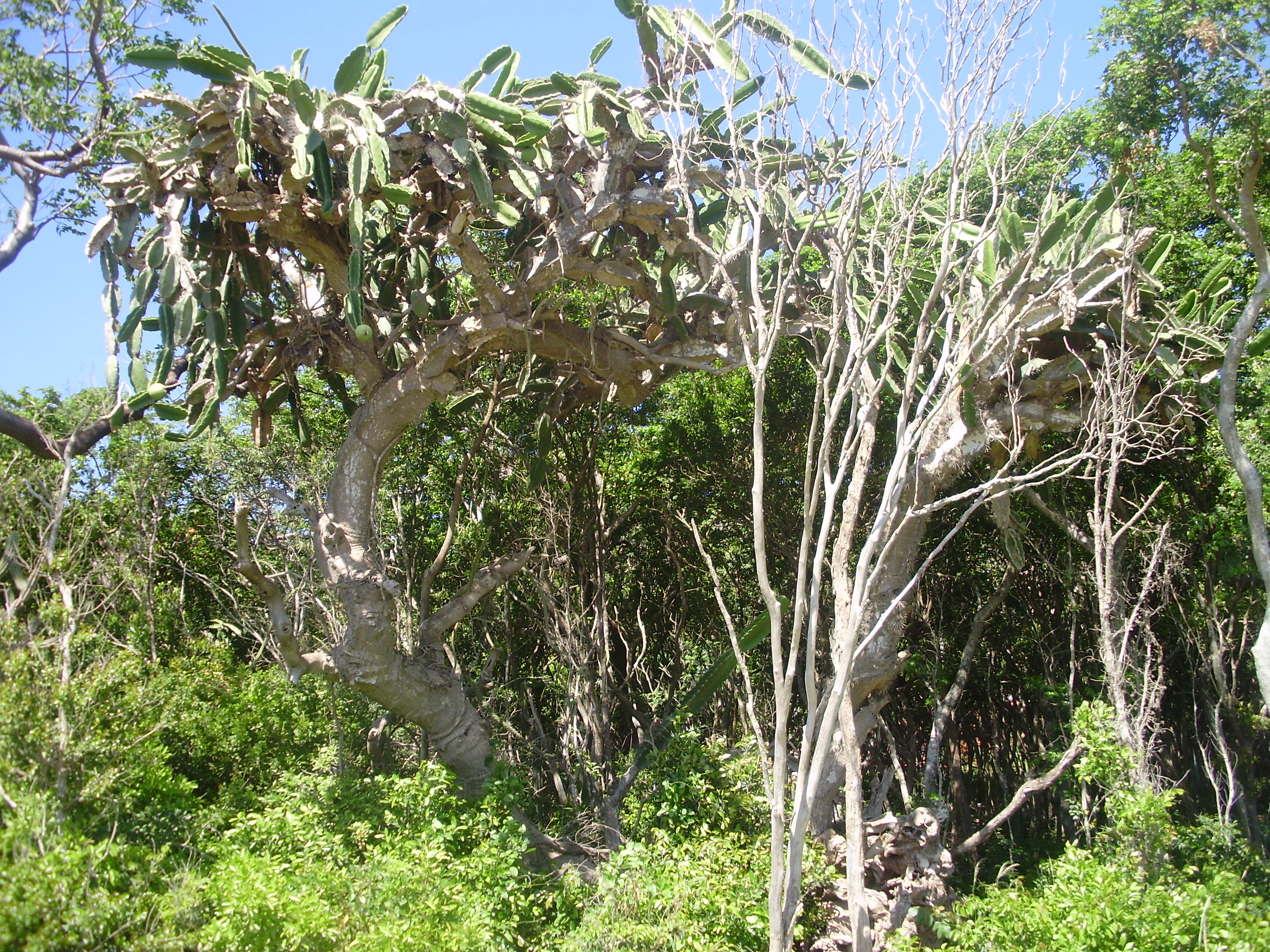
Plant growing in Varadero, Cuba

== Taxonomy ==
The first described by George Engelmann in 1869 as Cereus nudiflorus. Then, in 1920, it was reclassified as Dendrocereus nudiflorus by Britton and Rose. Only recently in 2020 was it reclassified as Leptocereus nudiflorus.
