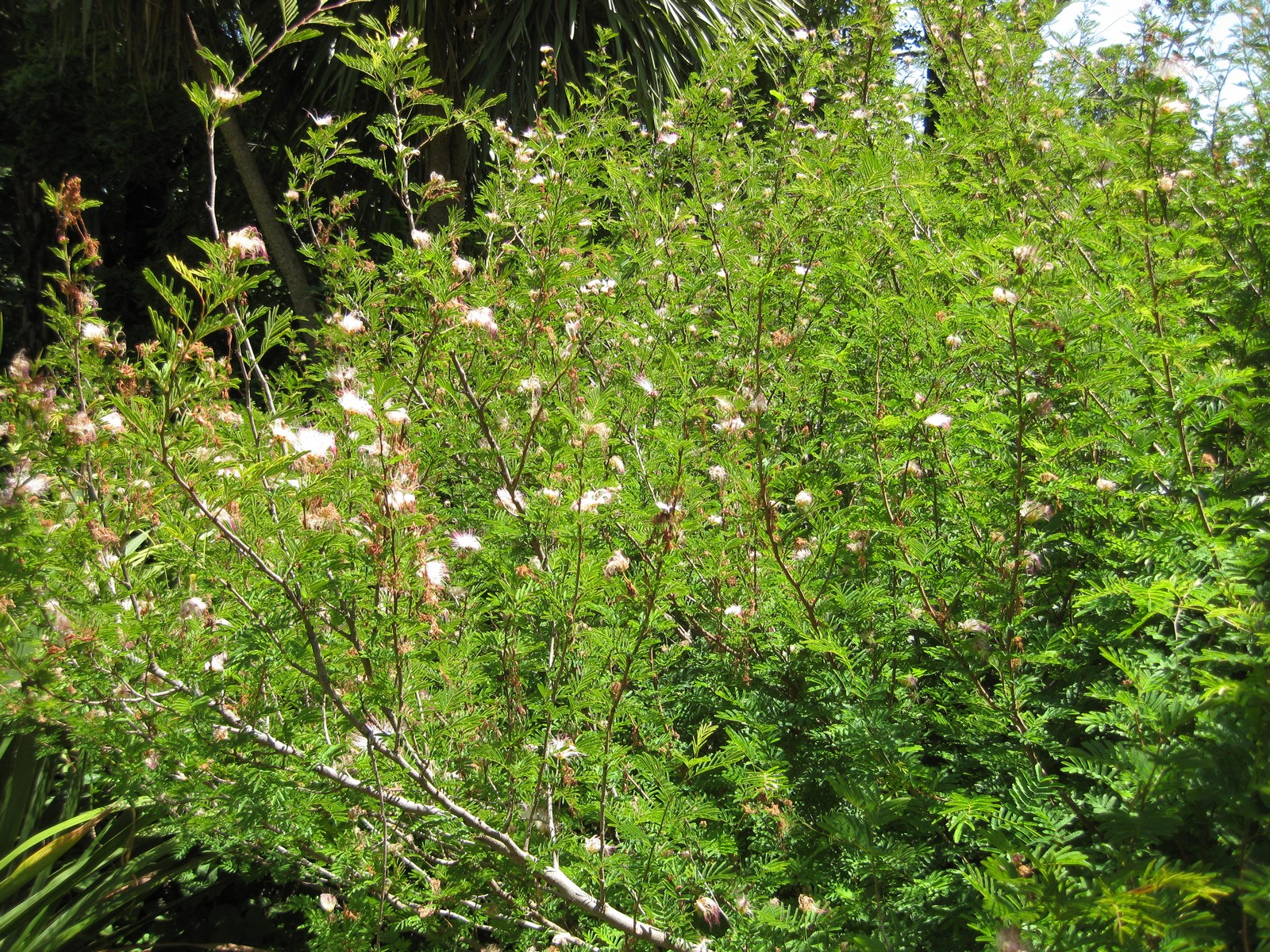
- Zapoteca portoricensis

Scientific classification
- Kingdom: Plantae
- Clade: Tracheophytes
- Clade: Angiosperms
- Clade: Eudicots
- Clade: Rosids
- Order: Fabales
- Family: Fabaceae
- Subfamily: Caesalpinioideae
- Clade: Mimosoid clade
- Genus: Zapoteca; H.M.Hern.

Species
- See text

= Zapoteca (plant) =

Genus of legumes

Zapoteca is a genus of flowering plants in the family Fabaceae, in the mimosoid clade of the subfamily Caesalpinioideae. It was separated from the genus Calliandra in 1986 on the basis of chromosome numbers, pollen, seedling structure, and other features. It is named in honour of the Zapotec peoples.

== Species ==
Species include:

- Zapoteca aculeata (Benth.) H.M.Hern.
- Zapoteca alinae H.M.Hern.
- Zapoteca amazonica (Benth.) H.M.Hern.
- Zapoteca andina H.M.Hern.
- Zapoteca caracasana (Jacq.) H.M.Hern.
- Zapoteca costaricensis (Britton & Rose) H.M.Hern.
- Zapoteca filipes (Benth.) H.M.Hern.
- Zapoteca formosa (Kunth) H.M.Hern.
- Zapoteca gracilis (Griseb.) Bassler
- Zapoteca lambertiana (G.Don) H.M.Hern.
- Zapoteca media (M.Martens & Galeotti) H.M.Hern
- Zapoteca microcephala (Britton & Killip) H.M.Hern.
- Zapoteca mollis (Standl.) H.M.Hern.
- Zapoteca nervosa (Urb.) H.M.Hern.
- Zapoteca portoricensis (Jacq.) H.M.Hern.
  - Zapoteca portoricensis subsp. portoricensis (Jacq.) H.M.Hern.
- Zapoteca quichoi H.M. Hern. & Hanan-Alipi
- Zapoteca ravenii H.M.Hern.
- Zapoteca scutellifera (Benth.) H.M.Hern.
- Zapoteca sousae H.M. Hern. & A. Campos V.
- Zapoteca tehuana H.M.Hern.
- Zapoteca tetragona (Willd.) H.M.Hern.
