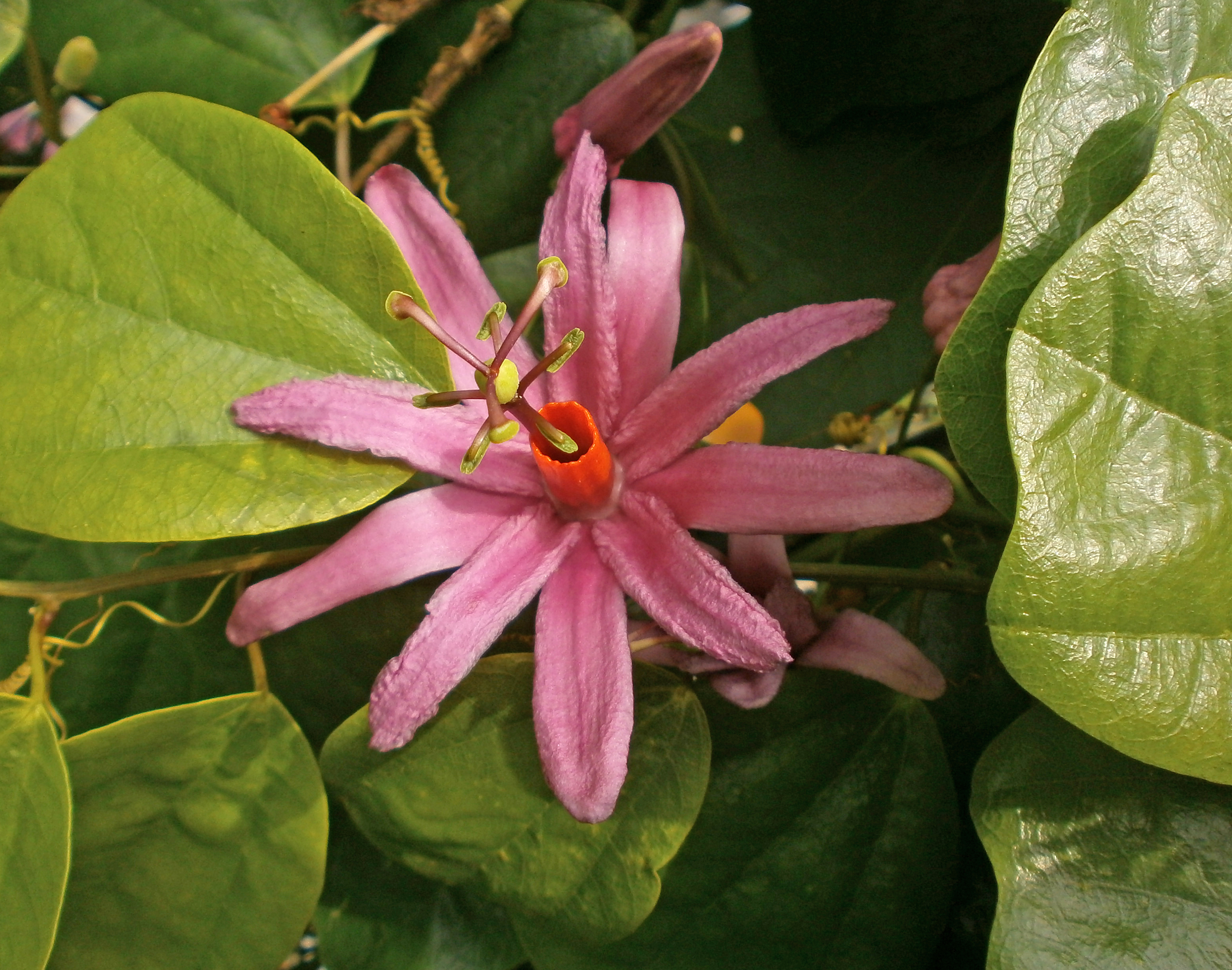

Scientific classification
- Kingdom: Plantae
- Clade: Tracheophytes
- Clade: Angiosperms
- Clade: Eudicots
- Clade: Rosids
- Order: Malpighiales
- Family: Passifloraceae
- Genus: Passiflora
- Species: P. tulae

Binomial name
- Passiflora tulae Urb.

= Passiflora tulae =

Species of plant

Passiflora tulae, the mountain love in the mist, pink passionflower, or tagua-tagua serrana, is a plant species in the family Passifloraceae.

It is native to Puerto Rico.
