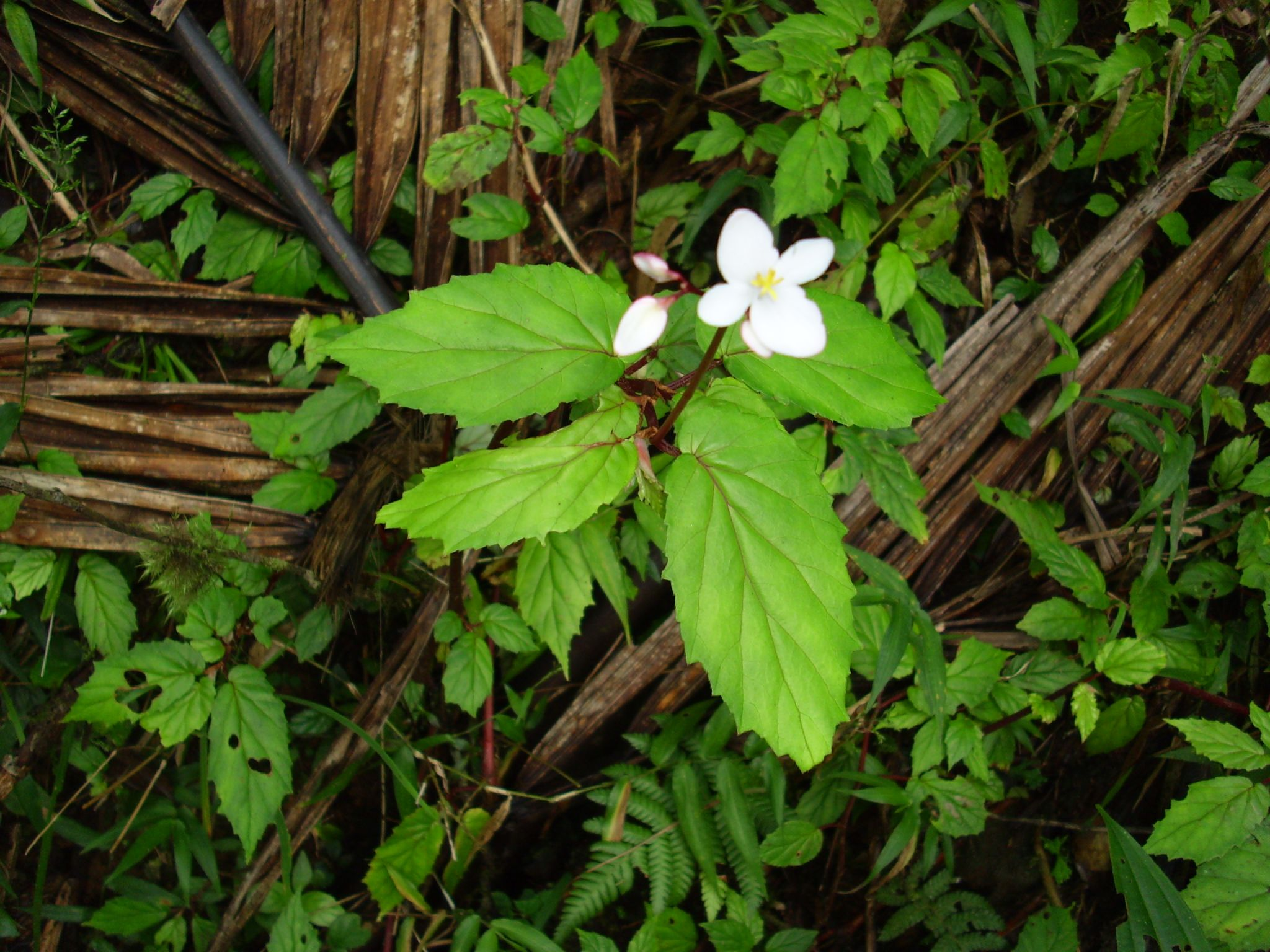
- Habit
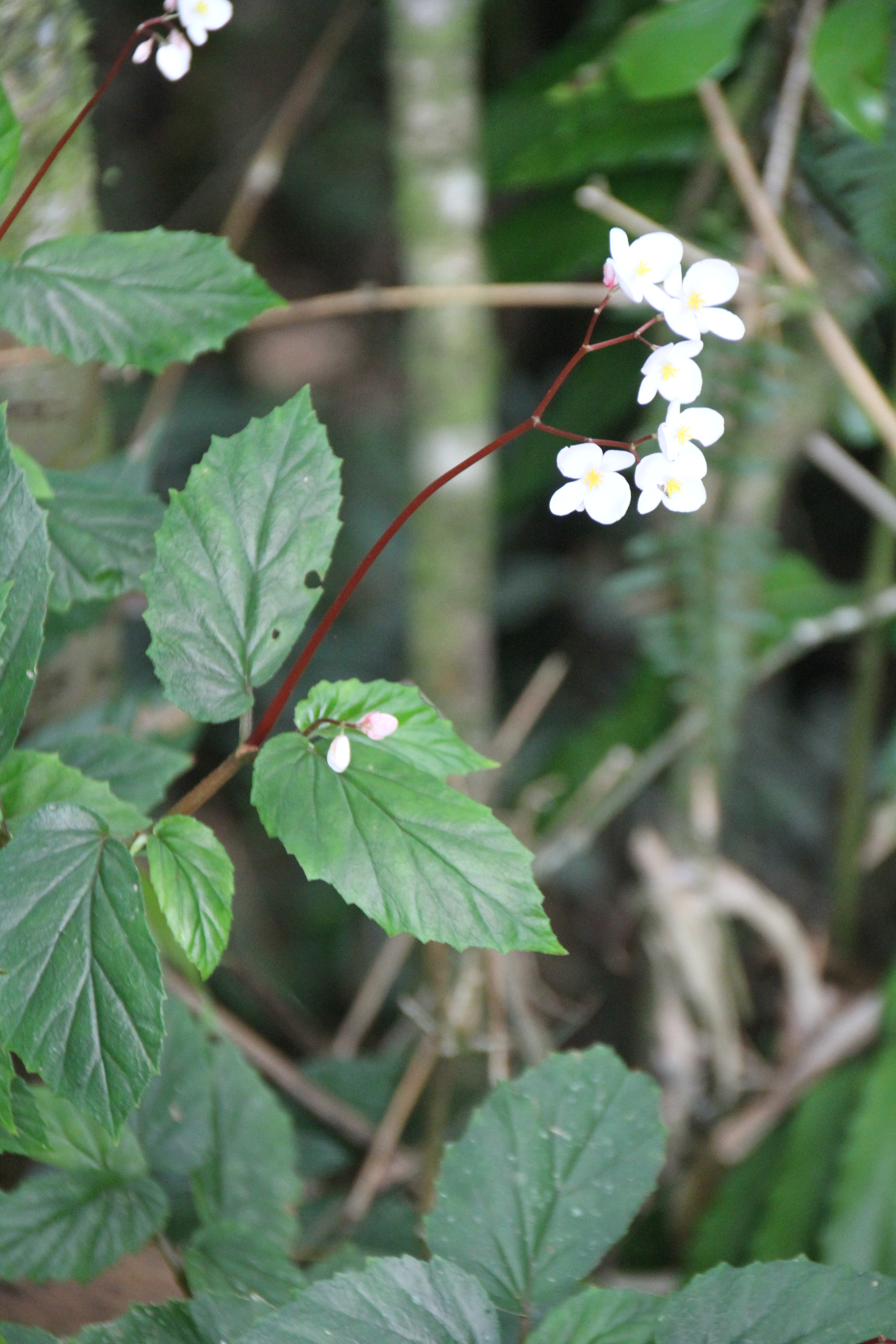
- In El Yunque National Forest

Scientific classification
- Kingdom: Plantae
- Clade: Tracheophytes
- Clade: Angiosperms
- Clade: Eudicots
- Clade: Rosids
- Order: Cucurbitales
- Family: Begoniaceae
- Genus: Begonia
- Species: B. decandra

Binomial name
- Begonia decandra Pav. ex A.DC.

Synonyms
- Begonia decandra Sessé & Moc.; Begonia portoricensis A.DC.

= Begonia decandra =

Species of plant

Begonia decandra, the native begonia or corazón de poeta, is a species of flowering plant in the family Begoniaceae, found only in Puerto Rico. An understory herb, its veins exude red sap when crushed. The plant prefers low light, with excessive light exposure sometimes leading to death. The white flowers most commonly bloom from April to October.
