= Cyperus urbani =

Scientific classification
- Kingdom: Plantae
- Clade: Tracheophytes
- Clade: Angiosperms
- Clade: Monocots
- Clade: Commelinids
- Order: Poales
- Family: Cyperaceae
- Genus: Cyperus
- Species: C. urbani

Binomial name
- Cyperus urbani Boeckeler

Species of sedge

Cyperus urbani, commonly known as Urban's sedge, is a species of sedge that is endemic to Puerto Rico.

The species was first formally described by the botanist Johann Otto Boeckeler in 1888. The specific epithet commemorates the German botanist Ignatz Urban, who specialised in the flora of the Caribbean.

== See also ==
- List of Cyperus species
