= Auerodendron pauciflorum =

Conservation status
- Critically Endangered (IUCN 3.1)

Scientific classification
- Kingdom: Plantae
- Clade: Tracheophytes
- Clade: Angiosperms
- Clade: Eudicots
- Clade: Rosids
- Order: Rosales
- Family: Rhamnaceae
- Genus: Auerodendron
- Species: A. pauciflorum

Binomial name
- Auerodendron pauciflorum Alain

Species of flowering plant

Auerodendron pauciflorum is a rare species of flowering plant in the family Rhamnaceae. One English language common name is turtlefat. It is endemic to Puerto Rico, where it is known from only one population in Isabela. At the time the plant was federally listed as an endangered species by the United States in 1994, only ten individual plants were known to exist. By 1997, there were 19 known specimens.

This is an evergreen shrub with black-dotted green leaves up to 15 centimeters long by 6 wide. Two or three flowers occur in the leaf axils.

The shrub is native to the tropical moist forests on the limestone hills in the northwestern corner of Puerto Rico. It was nearly eliminated due to several forces in its habitat. The land is privately owned and desirable for development with plans for construction of a resort and cell phone towers. The hills are quarried for limestone and deforestation is ongoing. The plant is already extremely rare, making it vulnerable to extinction from any one event. Vandalism could significantly reduce the population.

The plant was discovered in 1976. It is so rare that the fruit of the species has not been formally described to science and seedlings have not been noted. When existing plants were surveyed and measured, only one or two were mature enough to reproduce.
