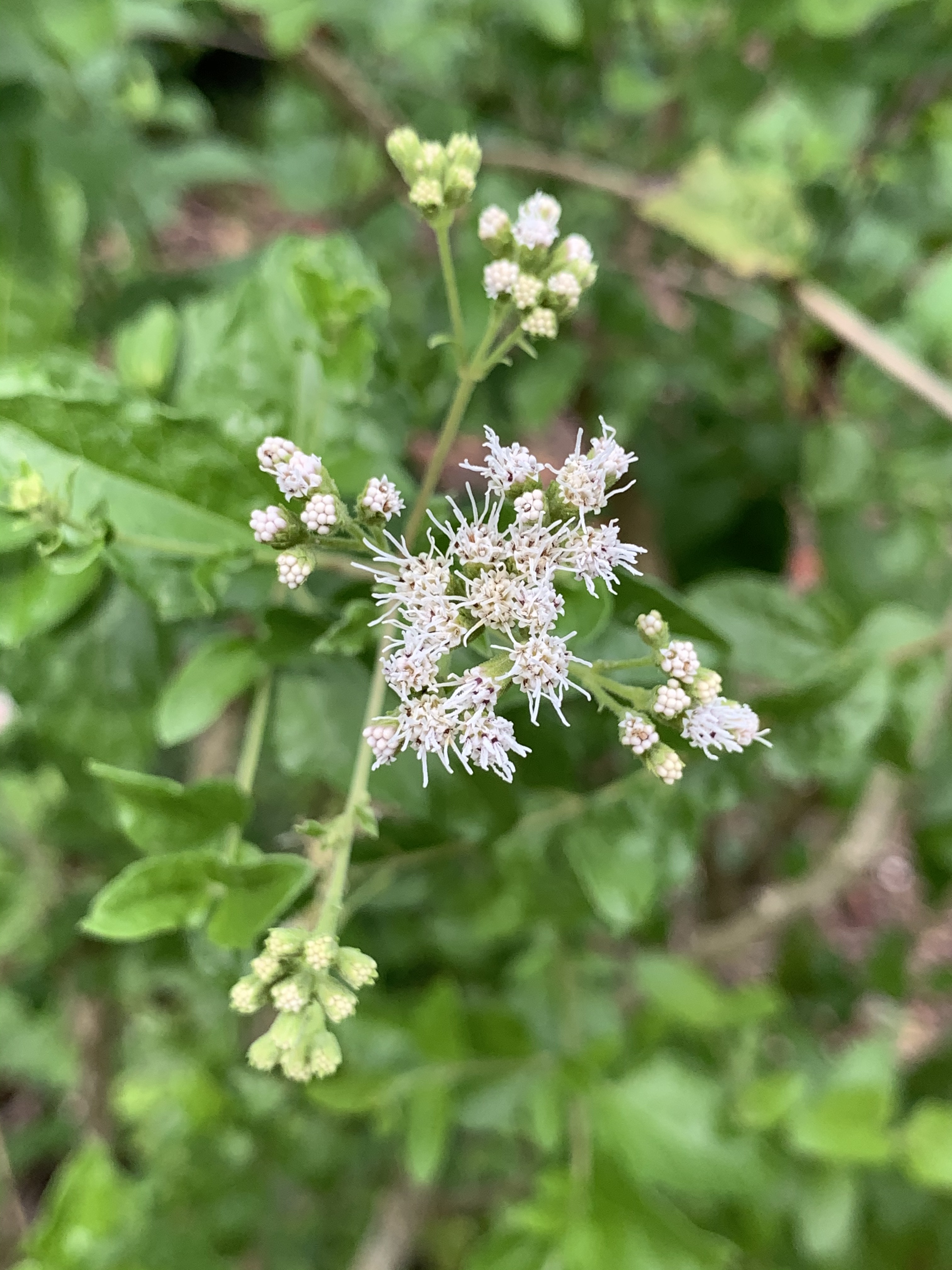

Conservation status
- Apparently Secure (NatureServe)

Scientific classification
- Kingdom: Plantae
- Clade: Tracheophytes
- Clade: Angiosperms
- Clade: Eudicots
- Clade: Asterids
- Order: Asterales
- Family: Asteraceae
- Genus: Koanophyllon
- Species: K. villosum

Binomial name
- Koanophyllon villosum (Sw.) R.King & H.Robinson 1975

Synonyms
- Synonymy: Eupatorium coriaceum Spreng.; Eupatorium cubense Pers. 1807; Eupatorium cubense DC. 1836; Eupatorium cynanchifolium DC.; Eupatorium deltoideum Poepp. ex Spreng. 1826 not Jacq. 1798; Eupatorium lindenianum A.Rich.; Eupatorium poeppigii Spreng.; Eupatorium villosum Sw. 1788; Koanophyllon cubense (DC.) R.M.King & H.Rob.; Koanophyllon cynanchifolium (DC.) R.M.King & H.Rob.; Koanophyllon lindenianum (A.Rich.) R.M.King & H.Rob.

= Koanophyllon villosum =

Species of flowering plant

Koanophyllon villosum, the Florida Keys thoroughwort, or abre camino, is a species of flowering plant in the family Asteraceae. It grows in southern Florida, Cuba, the Bahamas, Hispaniola, Jamaica, and the Islas de la Bahía (part of Honduras).

In Florida, it grows in what remains of the state's pine rockland habitat where it is regarded as endangered.

Koanophyllon villosum is a shrub up to 200 cm (80 inches) tall. Flower heads contain up to 15 pink or white disc flowers but no ray flowers.
