= Peperomia yabucoana =

Scientific classification
- Kingdom: Plantae
- Clade: Embryophytes
- Clade: Tracheophytes
- Clade: Angiosperms
- Clade: Magnoliids
- Order: Piperales
- Family: Piperaceae
- Genus: Peperomia
- Species: P. yabucoana

Binomial name
- Peperomia yabucoana Urb. & C.DC.

Synonyms
- Peperomia velutina Urb.

Species of plant

Peperomia yabucoana is a species of plant from the genus Peperomia. It is endemic to Puerto Rico. It was discovered by Ignatz Urban and Casimir de Candolle in 1902.
