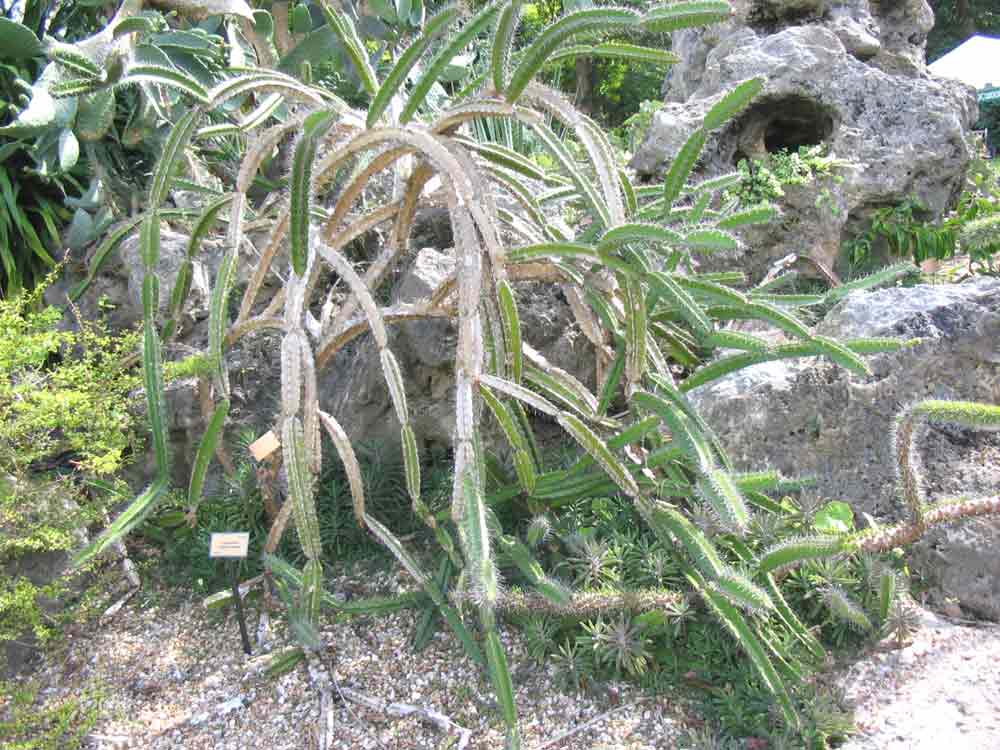

Conservation status
- Endangered (IUCN 3.1)

Scientific classification
- Kingdom: Plantae
- Clade: Embryophytes
- Clade: Tracheophytes
- Clade: Angiosperms
- Clade: Eudicots
- Order: Caryophyllales
- Family: Cactaceae
- Subfamily: Cactoideae
- Genus: Leptocereus
- Species: L. quadricostatus

Binomial name
- Leptocereus quadricostatus (Bello) Britton & Rose

Synonyms
- Cereus quadricostatus Bello; Neoabbottia quadricostata (Bello) Guiggi

= Leptocereus quadricostatus =

Species of cactus

Leptocereus quadricostatus, known as the sebucan (Spanish: sebucán), is a species of plant in the family Cactaceae. It is found in Puerto Rico and the British Virgin Islands. Its natural habitats are subtropical or tropical dry forests and subtropical or tropical dry shrubland. It is threatened by habitat loss. As of 2011, the IUCN classified the cactus as endangered.
