= Koanophyllon droserolepis =

Scientific classification
- Kingdom: Plantae
- Clade: Tracheophytes
- Clade: Angiosperms
- Clade: Eudicots
- Clade: Asterids
- Order: Asterales
- Family: Asteraceae
- Genus: Koanophyllon
- Species: K. droserolepis

Binomial name
- Koanophyllon droserolepis (B.L.Rob.) R.King & H.Robinson 1975

Synonyms
- Eupatorium droserolepis B.L.Rob. 1918

Species of flowering plant

Koanophyllon droserolepis, the Monte Torrecilla thoroughwort, is a species of flowering plant in the family Asteraceae. It is found only in Puerto Rico.
