= Koanophyllon dolicholepis =

Scientific classification
- Kingdom: Plantae
- Clade: Tracheophytes
- Clade: Angiosperms
- Clade: Eudicots
- Clade: Asterids
- Order: Asterales
- Family: Asteraceae
- Genus: Koanophyllon
- Species: K. dolicholepis

Binomial name
- Koanophyllon dolicholepis (Urb.) R.King & H.Robinson 1975

Synonyms
- Eupatorium dolicholepis (Urb.) Britton 1925; Eupatorium villosum var. dolicholepis Urb. 1899

Species of plant

Koanophyllon dolicholepis is a species of flowering plant in the family Asteraceae. It is found only in Puerto Rico.
