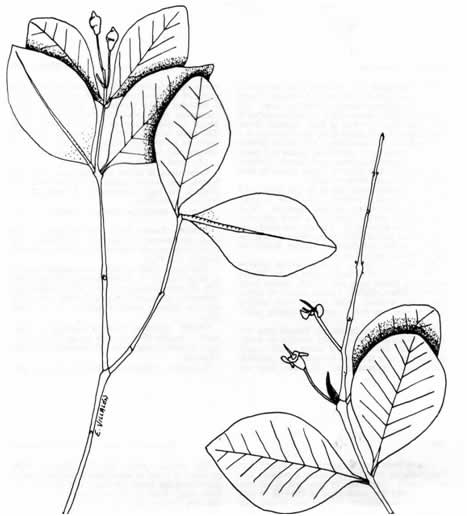
- 1974 illustration

Conservation status
- Data Deficient (IUCN 3.1)

Scientific classification
- Kingdom: Plantae
- Clade: Tracheophytes
- Clade: Angiosperms
- Clade: Eudicots
- Clade: Rosids
- Order: Myrtales
- Family: Myrtaceae
- Genus: Psidium
- Species: P. sintenisii

Binomial name
- Psidium sintenisii (Kiærsk.) Alain

Synonyms
- Calyptropsidium sintenisii Kiaersk.; Mitropsidium sintenisii (Kiaersk.) Burret

= Psidium sintenisii =

Species of plant

Psidium sintenisii is a species of flowering plant in the myrtle family, Myrtaceae. It is endemic to Puerto Rico, where it is known from three or four small subpopulations, mainly within El Yunque National Forest. It grows in wet mountain forest habitat. Its common names are Sintenis' guava and hoja menuda.

This evergreen tree, a species of wild guava, can reach 9 meters (30 ft) in height. It has gray, grooved, shreddy bark on the trunk and greenish branches. The shiny green glandular leaf blades are up to 6.3 centimeters (2.5 in) long. Flowers are solitary in the leaf axils, borne on long stalks. The buds are shaped like tops, and they are fragrant. The green or yellowish fruit is up to about 2 centimeters (1 in) long.
