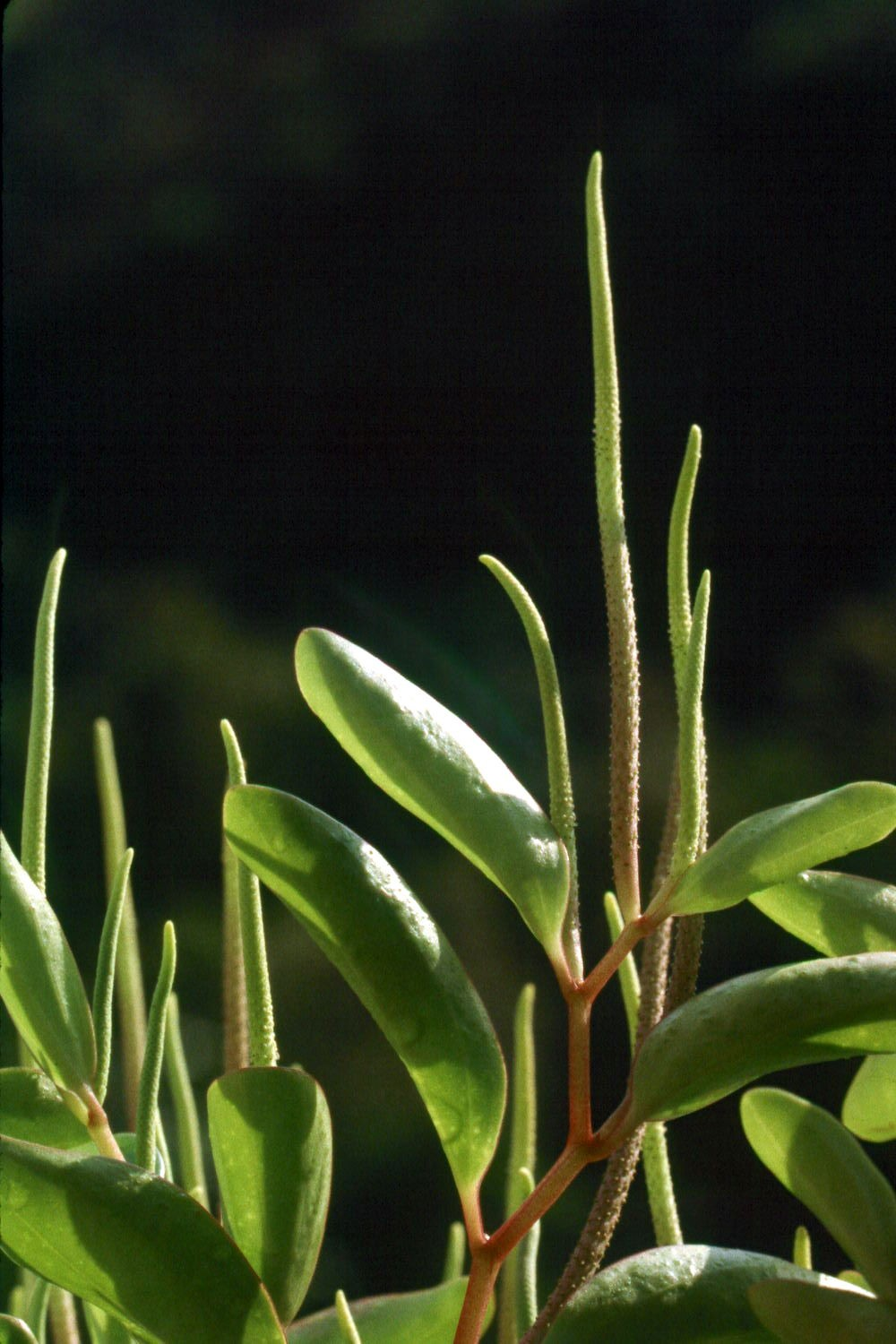

Conservation status
- Endangered (ESA)

Scientific classification
- Kingdom: Plantae
- Clade: Tracheophytes
- Clade: Angiosperms
- Clade: Magnoliids
- Order: Piperales
- Family: Piperaceae
- Genus: Peperomia
- Species: P. wheeleri

Binomial name
- Peperomia wheeleri Britton

= Peperomia wheeleri =

Species of flowering plant

Peperomia wheeleri is a rare species of flowering plant in the pepper family known by the common name Wheeler's peperomia. It is endemic to Puerto Rico, where it is known only from the island of Culebra. It has become rare because of deforestation and grazing by livestock. It is a federally listed endangered species of the United States.

This plant grows on the rocky island Culebra, anchoring in the humus that accumulates on the weathered granodiorite boulders covering its surface. The forest habitat hosts other plants including: Clusia rosea, Bursera simaruba, Ficus citrifolia, Tillandsia spp., Anthurium acaule, Whittmackia lingulata, and Epidendrum cochleatum. It can be found on the highest-elevation slopes of the island, located within Culebra National Wildlife Refuge.

The plant is an evergreen herb growing up to a meter tall with oppositely arranged leaves with fleshy blades up to 7 centimeters long by 5 wide. The inflorescence is up to 16 centimeters long but only a few millimeters wide and is covered in minute, nearly invisible flowers.

This plant is threatened by damage and destruction to the humus layer in which it grows. The scratching of domestic fowl can disturb it, and the removal of the forest canopy eliminates the source of the debris that forms the humus.
