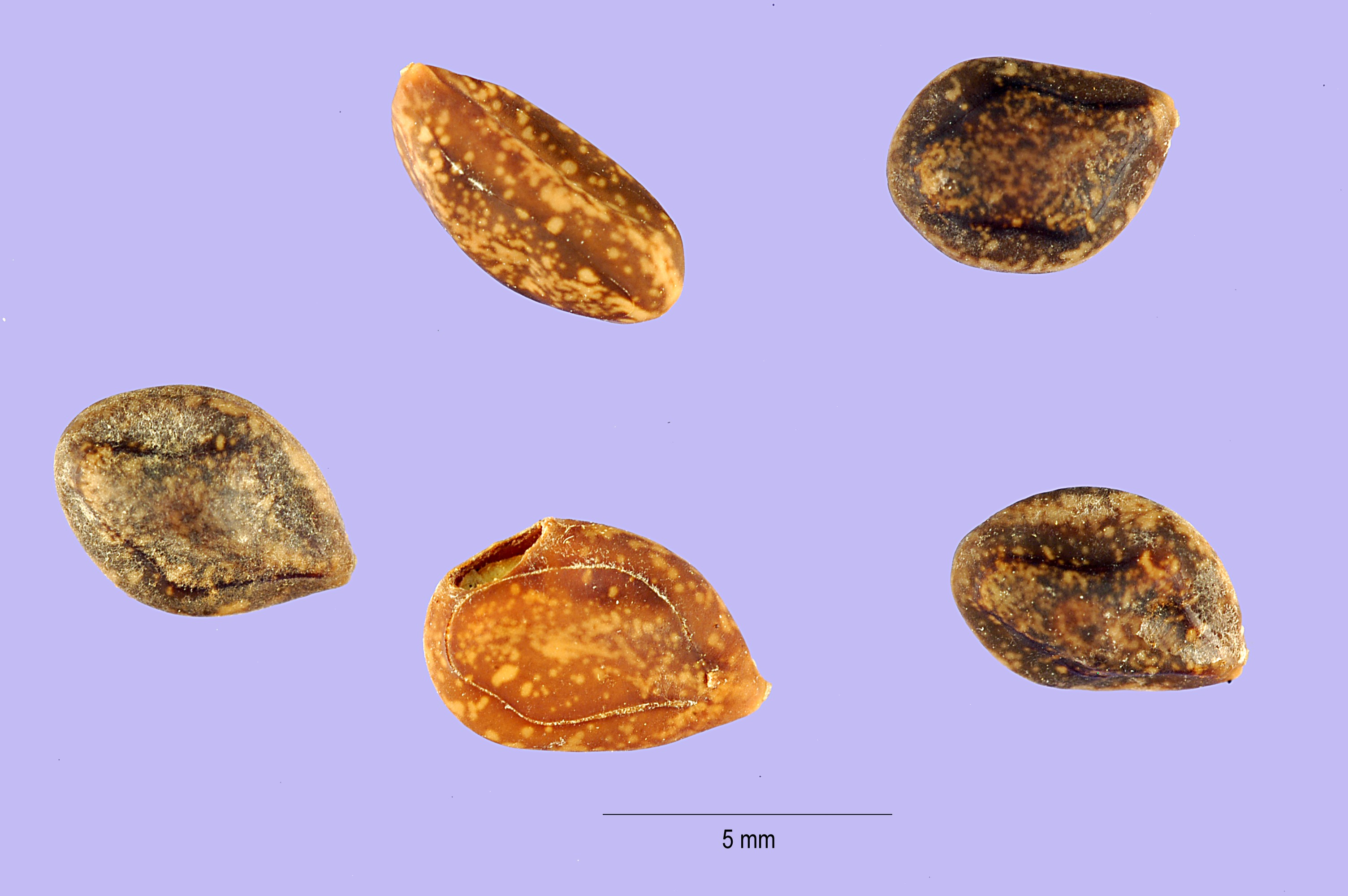

Scientific classification
- Kingdom: Plantae
- Clade: Tracheophytes
- Clade: Angiosperms
- Clade: Eudicots
- Clade: Rosids
- Order: Fabales
- Family: Fabaceae
- Subfamily: Caesalpinioideae
- Clade: Mimosoid clade
- Genus: Zapoteca
- Species: Z. portoricensis (Jacq.) H.M.Hern.
- Subspecies: Z. p. subsp. portoricensis

Trinomial name
- Zapoteca portoricensis subsp. portoricensis

Synonyms
- Acacia alba Colla; Acacia colleana C.Pres; Acacia hamiltonii Ham.; Acacia linearis Ham.; Acacia ungulata Desv.; Acacia vespertina Macfad.; Anneslia nicaraguensis (Loes.) Britton & Rose; Anneslia spraguei Britton & Rose; Calliandra nicaraguensis Loes.; Calliandra nogalensis Lundel; Calliandra portoricensis (Jacq.) Benth. var. major Sprague; Calliandra siltepecensis Lundell; Calliandra spraguei (Britton & Rose) Lundell; Lysiloma marchiana Griseb.; Mimosa guineensis Schum. & Thonn.

= Zapoteca portoricensis subsp. portoricensis =

Subspecies of legume

Zapoteca portoricensis subsp. portoricensis is a perennial tree.
