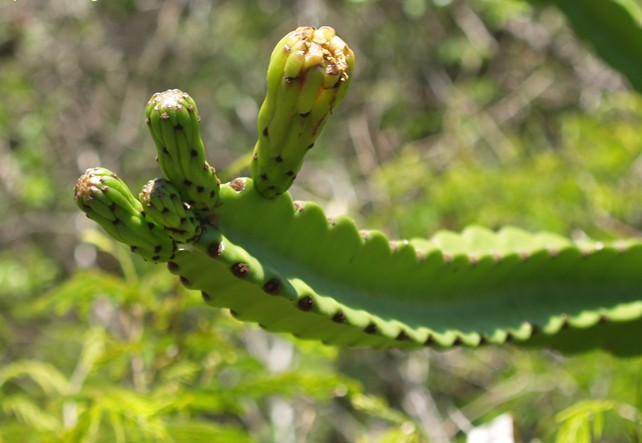

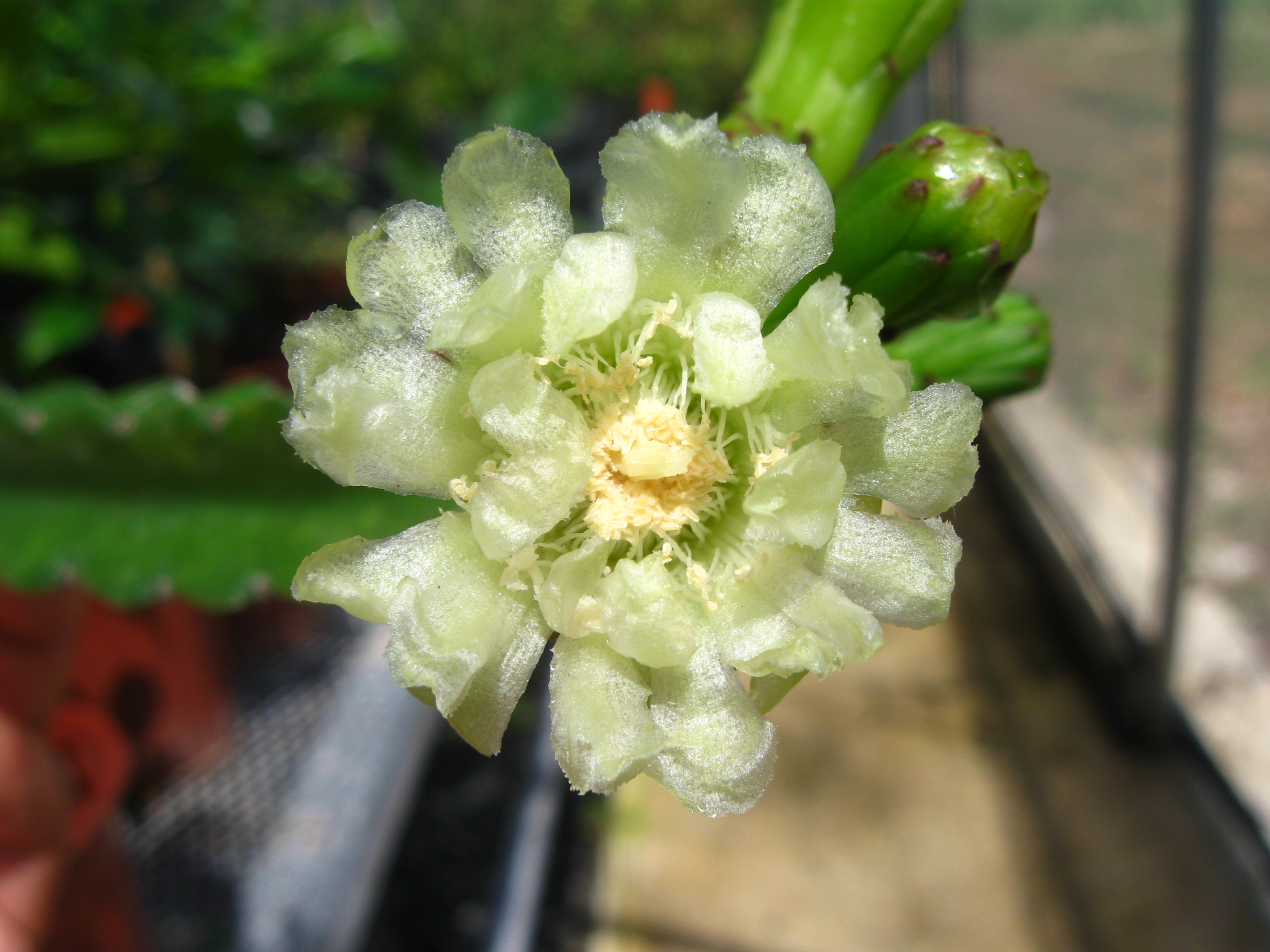
- Leptocereus grantianus flower

Conservation status
- Critically Endangered (IUCN 3.1)

- Endangered (ESA)

Scientific classification
- Kingdom: Plantae
- Clade: Tracheophytes
- Clade: Angiosperms
- Clade: Eudicots
- Order: Caryophyllales
- Family: Cactaceae
- Subfamily: Cactoideae
- Genus: Leptocereus
- Species: L. grantianus

Binomial name
- Leptocereus grantianus Britton

= Leptocereus grantianus =

Species of cactus

Leptocereus grantianus (sebucan) is a sprawling or suberect, nearly spineless cactus, reaching up to 2 meters in height and 3 to 5 centimeters in diameter. Its elongated stems have from three to five prominent ribs with broadly scalloped edges. Ribs of young joints are thin, and the small areoles or spine-bearing areas may bear from one to three minute, nearly black spines which disappear as the joints grow older. The flowers are solitary at terminal areoles, from 3 to 6 centimeters long, and nocturnal. The outer perianth segments are linear, green, and tipped by an areole like those of the tube and ovary. The inner perianth segments are numerous, cream-colored, oblong-obvate, obtuse, and about 8 millimeters long. The fruit is subglobose to ellipsoid and about 4 centimeters in diameter.

== Habitat ==
Leptocereus grantianus is endemic to the island of Culebra which is located just off the northeastern corner of Puerto Rico. Only one population, consisting of approximately 50 individuals, occurs along the rocky coast near Punta Melones. It is found in the subtropical dry forest life zone in dry thickets which grow on a crumbling rock substrate on a steep bank just above the shoreline. Associated species include the sea grape (Coccoloba uvifera) and almacigo (Bursera simaruba).

== Status ==
L. grantianus is an endangered species. It is federally listed by the United States Fish & Wildlife Service with an endangered status. Historically, deforestation and selective cutting for agriculture, grazing, production of charcoal, and the cutting of wood for construction materials have affected dry forest vegetation. Currently, the island of Culebra is subject to intense pressure for residential and tourist development. Land adjacent to the population is currently proposed for the development of a housing project. Its ornamental potential may result in take becoming a problem in the future. The steep rocky banks are unstable and located close to the shoreline; therefore, natural events, such as hurricanes, might result in the complete elimination of the only known population.
