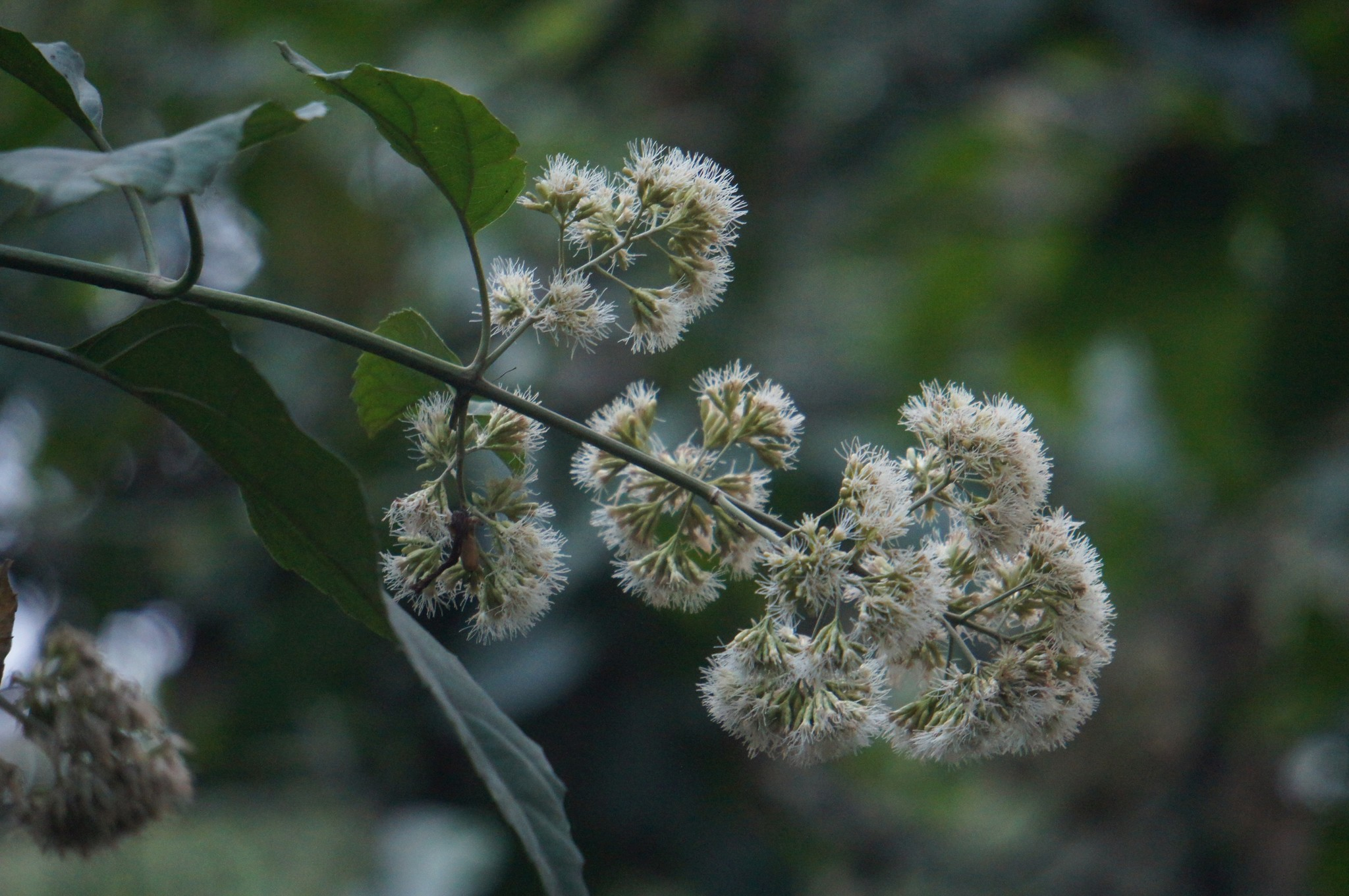
- Critonia morifolia

Scientific classification
- Kingdom: Plantae
- Clade: Tracheophytes
- Clade: Angiosperms
- Clade: Eudicots
- Clade: Asterids
- Order: Asterales
- Family: Asteraceae
- Subfamily: Asteroideae
- Tribe: Eupatorieae
- Genus: Critonia; P.Browne

Type species
- Critonia dalea (L.) DC.

Synonyms
- Dalea P.Browne 1756, rejected name, not Mill. 1754 (Solanaceae) nor L. 1758 (Fabaceae) nor Gaertn. 1788 (Scrophulariaceae) nor P.Browne 1756

= Critonia =

Genus of flowering plants

Critonia is a genus of flowering plants in the tribe Eupatorieae of the family Asteraceae.

The most notable trait that characterizes the genus is the presence of pellucid punctations caused by internal secretory pockets of the leaves - to be seen these must be viewed with a hand lens while holding the leaf up to light in most species of the genus. Most species of Critonia also have smooth opposite leaves, a shrubby habit, unenlarged style bases, relatively few (3-5) flowers per head, and imbricate involucres.

Species

The genus is native to Mexico, Central America, South America, and the West Indies.

- Critonia arachnoidea (Legname) R.M.King & H.Rob.
- Critonia aromatisans (DC.) R.M.King & H.Rob.
- Critonia bartlettii (B.L.Rob.) R.M.King & H.Rob.
- Critonia billbergiana (Beurl.) R.M.King & H.Rob.
- Critonia breedlovei R.M.King & H.Rob.
- Critonia campechensis (B.L.Rob.) R.M.King & H.Rob.
- Critonia conzattii (Greenm.) R.M.King & H.Rob.
- Critonia dalea (L.) DC.
- Critonia daleoides DC.
- Critonia dominicensis R.M.King & H.Rob.
- Critonia eggersii (Hieron.) R.M.King & H.Rob. - Ecuador
- Critonia eriocarpa (B.L.Rob. & Greenm.) R.M.King & H.Rob.
- Critonia heathiae B.L.Turner
- Critonia hebebotrya DC.
- Critonia hemipteropoda (B.L.Rob.) R.M.King & H.Rob.
- Critonia heteroneura Ernst
- Critonia hospitalis (B.L.Rob.) R.M.King & H.Rob.
- Critonia iltisii R.M.King & H.Rob.
- Critonia imbricata Griseb.
- Critonia inaequidens (Urb.) R.M.King & H.Rob.
- Critonia lanicaulis (B.L.Rob.) R.M.King & H.Rob.
- Critonia laurifolia (B.L.Rob.) R.M.King & H.Rob.
- Critonia lozanoana (B.L.Rob.) R.M.King & H.Rob.
- Critonia macropoda DC.
- Critonia megaphylla (Baker) R.M.King & H.Rob.
- Critonia morifolia (Mill.) R.M.King & H.Rob. - Bolivia
- Critonia naiguatensis (V.M.Badillo) R.M.King & H.Rob.
- Critonia nicaraguensis (B.L.Rob.) R.M.King & H.Rob.
- Critonia nubigenus (Benth.) R.M.King & H.Rob.
- Critonia paneroi B.L.Turner
- Critonia parviflora (Sw.) DC.
- Critonia peninsularis (Brandegee) R.M.King & H.Rob.
- Critonia platychaeta (Urb.) R.M.King & H.Rob.
- Critonia portoricensis (Urb.) Britton & P.Wilson
- Critonia pseudodalea DC.
- Critonia quadrangularis (DC.) R.M.King & H.Rob.
- Critonia sexangularis (Klatt) R.M.King & H.Rob.
- Critonia siltepecana (B.L.Turner) R.M.King & H.Rob.
- Critonia spinaciifolia (DC.) R.M.King & H.Rob.
- Critonia stigmatica (Urb. & Ekman) R.M.King & H.Rob.
- Critonia thyrsigera (Hieron.) R.M.King & H.Rob.
- Critonia thyrsoidea (Moc. ex DC.) R.M.King & H.Rob.
- Critonia tuxtiae R.M.King & H.Rob.
- Critonia wilburii R.M.King & H.Rob.
- Critonia yashanalensis (Whittem.) R.M.King & H.Rob.
