= Critonia portoricensis =

Conservation status
- Least Concern (IUCN 3.1)

Scientific classification
- Kingdom: Plantae
- Clade: Tracheophytes
- Clade: Angiosperms
- Clade: Eudicots
- Clade: Asterids
- Order: Asterales
- Family: Asteraceae
- Genus: Critonia
- Species: C. portoricensis

Binomial name
- Critonia portoricensis (Urb.) Britton & P.Wilson

Synonyms
- Eupatorium portoricense Urb.

Species of flowering plant

Critonia portoricensis, the Puerto Rico thoroughwort, is a species of plant in the family Asteraceae. It is endemic to Puerto Rico. It is a shrub or small tree of up to 4 m (13 ft) tall found in moist forests.
