= List of Myrcia species =

The following species in the flowering plant genus Myrcia are accepted by Plants of the World Online. Workers in the field have perceived this genus as difficult to study and its species to be difficult to identify, in part due to the sheer number of species and the lack of congruence between subclades erected on the basis of morphology and subclades revealed by molecular methods.

- Myrcia abbotiana (Urb.) Alain
- Myrcia abrantea (O.Berg) E.Lucas & Sobral
- Myrcia acevedoi (Alain) A.R.Lourenço & E.Lucas
- Myrcia acunae Borhidi
- Myrcia acutissima (Urb.) K.Campbell & K.Samra
- Myrcia adenophylla A.R.Lourenço & E.Lucas
- Myrcia adulterina T.Fern. & J.M.A.Braga
- Myrcia adunca Z.Acosta & K.Samra
- Myrcia aegiphylloides Mattos
- Myrcia aequatoriensis M.L.Kawas. & B.Holst
- Myrcia aerisea Z.Acosta & K.Samra
- Myrcia aethusa (O.Berg) N.Silveira
- Myrcia alatiramea Sobral & E.Lucas
- Myrcia albescens (Alain) Alain
- Myrcia albicans (Borhidi) Z.Acosta & K.Samra
- Myrcia albidotomentosa (Amshoff) McVaugh
- Myrcia albobrunnea McVaugh
- Myrcia albotomentosa DC.
- Myrcia aliena McVaugh
- Myrcia almasensis NicLugh.
- Myrcia altera Sobral
- Myrcia altomontana Sobral & Zorzan.
- Myrcia amanana Sobral & M.A.D.Souza
- Myrcia amapensis McVaugh
- Myrcia amarulenta (B.Holst) A.R.Lourenço & Sánchez-Cháv.
- Myrcia amazonica DC.
- Myrcia ambivalens McVaugh
- Myrcia amoena (Pilg.) A.R.Lourenço & E.Lucas
- Myrcia amplexicaulis (O.Berg) Hook.f.
- Myrcia ampliflora (M.L.Kawas.) A.R.Lourenço & E.Lucas
- Myrcia amplifolia T.Fern. & J.M.A.Braga
- Myrcia amshoffae (McVaugh) A.R.Lourenço & E.Lucas
- Myrcia anacardiifolia Gardner
- Myrcia anacletoi (Borhidi & O.Muñiz) Z.Acosta & K.Samra
- Myrcia anceps (Spreng.) O.Berg
- Myrcia anguerana (Sobral & Ibrahim) A.R.Lourenço & E.Lucas
- Myrcia angusta G.Don
- Myrcia anomala Cambess.
- Myrcia antillana McVaugh
- Myrcia antioquensis Parra-Os.
- Myrcia antonia (O.Berg) Mazine
- Myrcia apicata (C.Wright ex Griseb.) Z.Acosta & K.Samra
- Myrcia apiocarpa (O.Berg) N.Silveira
- Myrcia apoda (Urb.) Z.Acosta & K.Samra
- Myrcia apodocarpa Urb.
- Myrcia arachnicola (Sobral & M.C.Souza) A.R.Lourenço & E.Lucas
- Myrcia arborea (Urb. & Ekman) K.Campbell & Peguero
- Myrcia arcensis Z.Acosta & K.Samra
- Myrcia arenaria L.L.Santos, M.F.Sales & Sobral
- Myrcia arenicola (Urb.) Z.Acosta & K.Samra
- Myrcia areolata (McVaugh) E.Lucas & C.E.Wilson
- Myrcia ascendens M.F.Santos
- Myrcia asperorum Flickinger
- Myrcia atramentifera Barb.Rodr.
- Myrcia atropilosa (O.Berg) N.Silveira
- Myrcia atrorufa McVaugh
- Myrcia attenuata M.F.Santos
- Myrcia aurea NicLugh.
- Myrcia auriculata T.Fern., Sobral & J.M.A.Braga
- Myrcia auxotelica Sobral & Antunes
- Myrcia azulensis Z.Acosta & K.Samra
- Myrcia badia (O.Berg) N.Silveira
- Myrcia banilejoana (Alain) K.Campbell & Peguero
- Myrcia baracoensis (Borhidi) Z.Acosta & K.Samra
- Myrcia barituensis (Legname) B.Holst
- Myrcia barkeri (Ekman & Urb.) K.Campbell & Peguero
- Myrcia bartlettii (Standl.) A.R.Lourenço & Sánchez-Cháv.
- Myrcia basicordata Sobral
- Myrcia bella Cambess.
- Myrcia bergiana O.Berg
- Myrcia bergii (Krug & Urb.) Z.Acosta & K.Samra
- Myrcia bialata (Urb.) Z.Acosta & K.Samra
- Myrcia bicarinata (O.Berg) D.Legrand
- Myrcia bicolor Kiaersk.
- Myrcia biconvexa (M.C.Souza & Sobral) A.R.Lourenço & E.Lucas
- Myrcia billardiana (Kunth) DC.
- Myrcia bipennis (O.Berg) McVaugh
- Myrcia biptera (Amshoff) E.Lucas & C.E.Wilson
- Myrcia blanchetiana (O.Berg) Mattos
- Myrcia boanova (Sobral) A.R.Lourenço & E.Lucas
- Myrcia boldinghii (Urb.) K.Campbell & K.Samra
- Myrcia bolivarensis (Steyerm.) McVaugh
- Myrcia bonnetiasylvestris (Steyerm.) Steyerm.
- Myrcia borhidii O.Muñiz
- Myrcia botryophylla A.R.Lourenço & G.P.Burton
- Myrcia bracteata (Rich.) DC.
- Myrcia bracteosa (Urb. & Ekman) K.Campbell & Peguero
- Myrcia bredemeyeriana O.Berg
- Myrcia breviflora Sobral & M.A.D.Souza
- Myrcia brevispicata (McVaugh) K.Campbell & E.Lucas
- Myrcia brunnea Cambess.
- Myrcia buchenavioides (Parra-Os.) A.R.Lourenço & Parra-Os.
- Myrcia buxifolia Gardner
- Myrcia cacuminis L.Kollmann & Sobral
- Myrcia caesariata (McVaugh) E.Lucas & C.E.Wilson
- Myrcia calcicola Proctor
- Myrcia calderonii (Standl.) A.R.Lourenço & Sánchez-Cháv.
- Myrcia caloneura Sobral, M.A.D.Souza & M.F.Santos
- Myrcia calophylla (Urb. & Ekman) K.Campbell & Peguero
- Myrcia calycampa Amshoff
- Myrcia calyptrata (Griseb.) Z.Acosta & K.Samra
- Myrcia camapuanensis N.Silveira
- Myrcia cana (McVaugh) E.Lucas & C.E.Wilson
- Myrcia canaliculata (McVaugh) A.R.Lourenço & E.Lucas
- Myrcia canapuensis (Urb.) Z.Acosta & K.Samra
- Myrcia cancellata O.Berg
- Myrcia cantana M.A.D.Souza & Sobral
- Myrcia capitata O.Berg
- Myrcia carangola (Sobral & Leoni) A.R.Lourenço & E.Lucas
- Myrcia cardiaca O.Berg
- Myrcia cardiophylla Reichardt
- Myrcia carinata (M.L.Kawas. & B.Holst) A.R.Lourenço & E.Lucas
- Myrcia carioca A.R.Lourenço & E.Lucas
- Myrcia caroli (Britton & P.Wilson) Z.Acosta & K.Samra
- Myrcia carvalhoi NicLugh.
- Myrcia castanea M.A.D.Souza & Sobral
- Myrcia cataphyllata M.F.Santos
- Myrcia catharinensis (D.Legrand) NicLugh.
- Myrcia caudata (McVaugh) E.Lucas & C.E.Wilson
- Myrcia celaenensis E.Lucas & K.Samra
- Myrcia cerqueiria (Nied.) E.Lucas & Sobral
- Myrcia chapadensis S.Moore
- Myrcia chiapensis (Lundell) A.R.Lourenço & Sánchez-Cháv.
- Myrcia chionantha Flickinger
- Myrcia chonodisca E.Lucas & C.E.Wilson
- Myrcia chrysophylloides (Urb. & Ekman) K.Campbell & Peguero
- Myrcia chytraculia (L.) A.R.Lourenço & E.Lucas
- Myrcia cionei (Mattos) Mazine
- Myrcia circulensis Z.Acosta & K.Samra
- Myrcia circumdata Z.Acosta & K.Samra
- Myrcia citrifolia (Aubl.) Urb.
- Myrcia clarendonensis (Proctor) Flickinger
- Myrcia clarensis (Britton & P.Wilson) E.Lucas & K.Samra
- Myrcia clausa McVaugh
- Myrcia clavata Sobral
- Myrcia clavija Sobral
- Myrcia clementis (Britton & P.Wilson) E.Lucas & K.Samra
- Myrcia clusiifolia (Kunth) DC.
- Myrcia coelosepala Kiaersk.
- Myrcia colpodes Kiaersk.
- Myrcia compacta Z.Acosta & K.Samra
- Myrcia compactiflora (M.L.Kawas. & B.Holst) A.R.Lourenço & E.Lucas
- Myrcia compta McVaugh
- Myrcia concava McVaugh
- Myrcia concinna B.Holst & M.L.Kawas.
- Myrcia concisa Sobral & Leoni
- Myrcia conduplicata (B.Holst) A.R.Lourenço & E.Lucas
- Myrcia congestiflora Caliari & V.C.Souza
- Myrcia connata McVaugh
- Myrcia contrerasii (Lundell) A.R.Lourenço & Sánchez-Cháv.
- Myrcia convexivenia (B.Holst) E.Lucas & C.E.Wilson
- Myrcia cordiformis Mattos
- Myrcia cordiifolia DC.
- Myrcia corticosa (Sobral & M.A.D.Souza) K.Campbell & E.Lucas
- Myrcia costeira M.F.Santos
- Myrcia coumete (Aubl.) DC.
- Myrcia crassa Sobral
- Myrcia crassimarginata McVaugh
- Myrcia crebra (McVaugh) A.R.Lourenço & E.Lucas
- Myrcia crispa McVaugh
- Myrcia cristalensis Borhidi & O.Muñiz
- Myrcia cujabensis O.Berg
- Myrcia cuneifolia (Lundell) A.R.Lourenço & Sánchez-Cháv.
- Myrcia cuprea (O.Berg) Kiaersk.
- Myrcia curassavica (Amshoff) Stoffers
- Myrcia curta (Sobral & O.T.Aguiar) K.Campbell & E.Lucas
- Myrcia curtipendula NicLugh.
- Myrcia cuspidata (Mart. ex DC.) A.R.Lourenço & E.Lucas
- Myrcia cymatophylla E.Lucas & G.P.Burton
- Myrcia cymosa (O.Berg) Nied.
- Myrcia debilis Cambess.
- Myrcia decandra (Griseb.) Z.Acosta & K.Samra
- Myrcia decorticans DC.
- Myrcia deflexa (Poir.) DC.
- Myrcia delicata Gressler & Sobral
- Myrcia densa (DC.) Sobral
- Myrcia densiflora (Poepp. ex O.Berg) A.R.Lourenço & E.Lucas
- Myrcia densifolia (Urb. & Ekman) K.Campbell & Peguero
- Myrcia depressa (Urb.) K.Campbell & Peguero
- Myrcia dermatophylla Kiaersk.
- Myrcia diaphana (O.Berg) N.Silveira
- Myrcia diaz-piedrahitae Parra-Os. & A.Patiño
- Myrcia dichasialis McVaugh
- Myrcia dichrophylla D.Legrand
- Myrcia directa McVaugh
- Myrcia dispar McVaugh
- Myrcia divisoria Sobral & M.A.D.Souza
- Myrcia dolichopetala Kiaersk.
- Myrcia doniana O.Berg
- Myrcia dryadica (M.L.Kawas.) A.R.Lourenço & E.Lucas
- Myrcia egensis (O.Berg) McVaugh
- Myrcia ehrenbergiana (O.Berg) McVaugh
- Myrcia elattophylla Diels
- Myrcia elevata M.F.Santos
- Myrcia elliptifolia A.R.Lourenço & E.Lucas
- Myrcia enneantha (C.Wright) Z.Acosta & K.Samra
- Myrcia ensiformis (McVaugh) E.Lucas & C.E.Wilson
- Myrcia eriocalyx DC.
- Myrcia eriocephala (Urb.) K.Campbell & Peguero
- Myrcia eriopus DC.
- Myrcia ermitensis (Borhidi) Z.Acosta & K.Samra
- Myrcia espiritosantensis B.S.Amorim
- Myrcia estoraquensis (Parra-Os.) A.R.Lourenço & Parra-Os.
- Myrcia estremerae (Alain) E.Lucas & Acev.-Rodr.
- Myrcia eugenioides Cambess.
- Myrcia eugeniopsoides (D.Legrand & Kausel) Mazine
- Myrcia eumecephylla (O.Berg) Nied.
- Myrcia eveae Gaem & Mazine
- Myrcia exapata Sobral
- Myrcia exasperata (Borhidi) Z.Acosta & K.Samra
- Myrcia excoriata (Mart.) E.Lucas & C.E.Wilson
- Myrcia eximia DC.
- Myrcia exploratoris McVaugh
- Myrcia extranea McVaugh
- Myrcia fasciata McVaugh
- Myrcia fascicularis O.Berg
- Myrcia fasciculata (O.Berg) K.Campbell & K.Samra
- Myrcia fawcettii K.Campbell & K.Samra
- Myrcia federalis Bezerra & Faria
- Myrcia felisbertii (DC.) O.Berg
- Myrcia fenestrata DC.
- Myrcia fenzliana O.Berg
- Myrcia ferruginea (Poir.) DC.
- Myrcia ferruginosa Mazine
- Myrcia filibracteata Mattos & D.Legrand
- Myrcia flagellaris (D.Legrand) Sobral
- Myrcia flavoviridis (Urb.) Z.Acosta & K.Samra
- Myrcia florida Lem.
- Myrcia floridissima Sobral
- Myrcia foramina Z.Acosta & K.Samra
- Myrcia fosteri Croat
- Myrcia foveolata (B.Holst) M.F.Santos
- Myrcia fria Sobral
- Myrcia fusca B.Holst & M.L.Kawas.
- Myrcia fusiformis (M.L.Kawas.) A.R.Lourenço & E.Lucas
- Myrcia galanoana Z.Acosta & K.Samra
- Myrcia garciae (Alain & M.M.Mejía) K.Campbell & Peguero
- Myrcia gaudichaudiana (O.Berg) M.F.Santos
- Myrcia gentryi B.Holst
- Myrcia gestasiana Cambess.
- Myrcia gigantea (O.Berg) Nied.
- Myrcia gigantifolia M.L.Kawas. & Á.J.Pérez
- Myrcia gigas McVaugh
- Myrcia gilsoniana G.M.Barroso & Peixoto
- Myrcia glabra (O.Berg) D.Legrand
- Myrcia glabrescens (Krug & Urb.) Z.Acosta & K.Samra
- Myrcia glauca Cambess.
- Myrcia glazioviana Kiaersk.
- Myrcia glaziovii Mattos & D.Legrand
- Myrcia glomerata (Cambess.) G.P.Burton & E.Lucas
- Myrcia gollmeriana O.Berg
- Myrcia gomidesioides Kiaersk.
- Myrcia gonini McVaugh
- Myrcia govinha S.Moore
- Myrcia goyazensis Cambess.
- Myrcia graciliflora Sagot
- Myrcia gracilipes (C.Wright) Z.Acosta & K.Samra
- Myrcia grammica (Spreng.) A.R.Lourenço & E.Lucas
- Myrcia grandifolia Cambess.
- Myrcia grandis McVaugh
- Myrcia grazielae NicLugh.
- Myrcia guarujana Sobral, Magenta & Caliari
- Myrcia guavira Parodi
- Myrcia guavira-mi Parodi
- Myrcia guayabillo (Alain) K.Campbell & Peguero
- Myrcia guedesiae J.D.O.Melo & Stadnik
- Myrcia guianensis (Aubl.) DC.
- Myrcia guildingiana (Griseb.) E.Lucas & C.E.Wilson
- Myrcia gundlachii Krug & Urb.
- Myrcia haenkeana (O.Berg) Mattos
- Myrcia hanoverensis K.Campbell & Commock
- Myrcia hartwegiana (O.Berg) Kiaersk.
- Myrcia hatschbachii D.Legrand
- Myrcia hebepetala DC.
- Myrcia hedraiophylla A.R.Lourenço & E.Lucas
- Myrcia heliandina Diels
- Myrcia heringii D.Legrand
- Myrcia hernandezii Parra-Os.
- Myrcia heterochroa (Urb.) Z.Acosta & K.Samra
- Myrcia heteroclada (Urb. & Ekman) K.Campbell & Peguero
- Myrcia hexasticha Kiaersk.
- Myrcia hilariana O.Berg
- Myrcia hintonii (Lundell) A.R.Lourenço & Sánchez-Cháv.
- Myrcia hirtiflora DC.
- Myrcia hispida O.Berg
- Myrcia hoffmannseggii O.Berg
- Myrcia holstii E.Lucas & C.E.Wilson
- Myrcia hondurensis (Standl.) A.R.Lourenço & Sánchez-Cháv.
- Myrcia hotteana Urb. & Ekman
- Myrcia huallagae McVaugh
- Myrcia hydrophila Z.Acosta & K.Samra
- Myrcia hylobates (Standl. ex Amshoff) E.Lucas & K.Samra
- Myrcia hypericoides Cambess.
- Myrcia hypoleuca Spring ex Mart.
- Myrcia hypophaea Sobral
- Myrcia icnii Parra-Os.
- Myrcia imperfecta McVaugh
- Myrcia inaequiloba (DC.) Lemée
- Myrcia incompleta Sobral & M.A.D.Souza
- Myrcia inconspicua L.Kollmann & Sobral
- Myrcia induta McVaugh
- Myrcia innovans Kiaersk.
- Myrcia insigniflora M.F.Santos
- Myrcia insignis (McVaugh) E.Lucas & C.E.Wilson
- Myrcia insularis Gardner
- Myrcia integra M.A.D.Souza & Sobral
- Myrcia intonsa (McVaugh) B.Holst
- Myrcia iranduba M.A.D.Souza & Sobral
- Myrcia irregularis (Sobral, M.A.D.Souza & Luize) K.Campbell & E.Lucas
- Myrcia isaiana G.M.Barroso & Peixoto
- Myrcia ishoaquinicca (M.L.Kawas. & B.Holst) A.R.Lourenço & E.Lucas
- Myrcia izabalana (Lundell) A.R.Lourenço & Sánchez-Cháv.
- Myrcia javariana Sobral & M.A.D.Souza
- Myrcia jefensis (B.Holst & M.L.Kawas.) A.R.Lourenço & E.Lucas
- Myrcia jimenoana (Alain) K.Campbell & Peguero
- Myrcia johnstonii (McVaugh) A.R.Lourenço & Parra-Os.
- Myrcia karlingii (Standl.) A.R.Lourenço & Sánchez-Cháv.
- Myrcia karuaiensis (Steyerm.) E.Lucas & C.E.Wilson
- Myrcia karwinskyana (O.Berg) A.R.Lourenço & Sánchez-Cháv.
- Myrcia killipii (Standl.) A.R.Lourenço & Parra-Os.
- Myrcia krugii (Kiaersk.) E.Lucas & Acev.-Rodr.
- Myrcia krugioides (McVaugh) A.R.Lourenço & E.Lucas
- Myrcia kylistophylla B.Holst
- Myrcia lacerdaeana O.Berg
- Myrcia lacunosa (O.Berg) N.Silveira
- Myrcia laevis G.Don
- Myrcia landimiana Proença & M.Ibrahim
- Myrcia lanuginosa O.Berg
- Myrcia lapidulosa B.Holst & M.L.Kawas.
- Myrcia laricina (O.Berg) Burret ex Luetzelb.
- Myrcia lascada Sobral
- Myrcia lasiantha DC.
- Myrcia laxa Sobral & M.A.D.Souza
- Myrcia laxiflora Cambess.
- Myrcia legrandii A.R.Lourenço & E.Lucas
- Myrcia lenheirensis Kiaersk.
- Myrcia leonis (Borhidi & O.Muñiz) Z.Acosta & K.Samra
- Myrcia lepida (McVaugh) A.R.Lourenço & E.Lucas
- Myrcia levisensis (Bisse & Am.Rodr.) Z.Acosta & K.Samra
- Myrcia liesneri B.Holst
- Myrcia lignosa Villarroel & Proença
- Myrcia ligustrina (McVaugh) E.Lucas & C.E.Wilson
- Myrcia lilloi (Speg.) E.Lucas & K.Samra
- Myrcia limoncillo (Alain) K.Campbell & Peguero
- Myrcia linearifolia Cambess.
- Myrcia linearis (Alain) Z.Acosta & K.Samra
- Myrcia littoralis DC.
- Myrcia lituatinervia (O.Berg) E.Lucas & C.E.Wilson
- Myrcia lojensis B.Holst & M.L.Kawas.
- Myrcia lomensis (Urb.) Z.Acosta & K.Samra
- Myrcia lonchophylla A.R.Lourenço & E.Lucas
- Myrcia longicalyptrata (B.Holst & M.L.Kawas.) A.R.Lourenço & E.Lucas
- Myrcia longipaniculata Caliari & V.C.Souza
- Myrcia longiramea M.A.D.Souza & Sobral
- Myrcia longisepala B.S.Amorim
- Myrcia loranthifolia (DC.) G.P.Burton & E.Lucas
- Myrcia lozanoi (Parra-Os.) A.R.Lourenço & Parra-Os.
- Myrcia lucasiae R.B.Almeida, Antar & B.S.Amorim
- Myrcia lughadhae B.S.Amorim
- Myrcia luquillensis (Alain) E.Lucas & A.R.Lourenço
- Myrcia luschnathiana O.Berg
- Myrcia lutescens Cambess.
- Myrcia macaca Sobral & M.A.D.Souza
- Myrcia macrantha (Standl. & Steyerm.) A.R.Lourenço & Sánchez-Cháv.
- Myrcia macrocalyx Faria & Soares-Silva
- Myrcia macrocarpa DC.
- Myrcia macucana Sobral
- Myrcia maculata M.F.Santos
- Myrcia madida McVaugh
- Myrcia maestrensis (Urb.) Alain
- Myrcia magna D.Legrand
- Myrcia magnifolia (O.Berg) Kiaersk.
- Myrcia maguirei (McVaugh) E.Lucas & C.E.Wilson
- Myrcia majaguitana Alain & M.M.Mejía
- Myrcia manacalensis Urb.
- Myrcia manausensis M.A.D.Souza & Sobral
- Myrcia mansoniana O.Berg
- Myrcia manuensis (B.Holst & M.L.Kawas.) A.R.Lourenço & E.Lucas
- Myrcia maraana Sobral & M.A.D.Souza
- Myrcia margaretiae (Alain) Alain
- Myrcia marianae Stagg. & E.Lucas
- Myrcia maritima (Sobral & Bertoncello) A.R.Lourenço & E.Lucas
- Myrcia marliereana A.R.Lourenço & E.Lucas
- Myrcia marmeladensis (Urb. & Ekman) K.Campbell & Peguero
- Myrcia martiusiana (DC.) A.R.Lourenço & E.Lucas
- Myrcia martorellii (Alain) E.Lucas & Acev.-Rodr.
- Myrcia mathewsiana (O.Berg) McVaugh
- Myrcia matogrossensis Faria & Sobral
- Myrcia maxima (McVaugh) A.R.Lourenço & Parra-Os.
- Myrcia maximiliana O.Berg
- Myrcia maxonii (Britton & Urb.) Flickinger
- Myrcia mayana (Lundell) A.R.Lourenço & Sánchez-Cháv.
- Myrcia mayarensis (Borhidi) Z.Acosta & K.Samra
- Myrcia mcvaughii (B.Holst) E.Lucas & C.E.Wilson
- Myrcia megapaniculata A.R.Lourenço & Parra-Os.
- Myrcia megistophylla (Standl.) A.R.Lourenço & Sánchez-Cháv.
- Myrcia melanophylla A.R.Lourenço & E.Lucas
- Myrcia melastomoides DC.
- Myrcia meridensis (Steyerm.) A.R.Lourenço & Parra-Os.
- Myrcia mesoamericana (P.E.Sánchez) A.R.Lourenço & Sánchez-Cháv.
- Myrcia micropetala (Mart.) Nied.
- Myrcia microphylla O.Berg
- Myrcia microstachya Krug & Urb.
- Myrcia millspaughii (Urb.) A.R.Lourenço & Sánchez-Cháv.
- Myrcia minutiflora Sagot
- Myrcia mirabilis (Bisse & Am.Rodr.) Z.Acosta & K.Samra
- Myrcia mischophylla Kiaersk.
- Myrcia moaensis (Alain) A.R.Lourenço & E.Lucas
- Myrcia moctezumae (Sánchez-Cháv. & Zamudio) A.R.Lourenço & Sánchez-Cháv.
- Myrcia mollis (Kunth) DC.
- Myrcia monocarpa (Urb.) Z.Acosta & K.Samra
- Myrcia monoclada Sobral
- Myrcia montana Cambess.
- Myrcia monteverdensis (P.E.Sánchez) A.R.Lourenço & Sánchez-Cháv.
- Myrcia mornicola (Urb.) K.Campbell & Peguero
- Myrcia morroqueimadensis Kiaersk.
- Myrcia mucugensis Sobral
- Myrcia multiflora (Lam.) DC.
- Myrcia multiglomerata (Amshoff) E.Lucas & C.E.Wilson
- Myrcia multipunctata Mazine
- Myrcia munizii (Borhidi) Z.Acosta & K.Samra
- Myrcia mutabilis (O.Berg) N.Silveira
- Myrcia myrcioides (Mattos & D.Legrand) Mattos
- Myrcia myriantha McVaugh
- Myrcia myrtillifolia DC.
- Myrcia nandu-apysa Parodi
- Myrcia neesiana DC.
- Myrcia neoacunae Z.Acosta & K.Samra
- Myrcia neoaequatoriensis A.R.Lourenço & E.Lucas
- Myrcia neoblanchetiana Sobral & E.Lucas
- Myrcia neobracteata A.R.Lourenço & E.Lucas
- Myrcia neobuxifolia E.Lucas & C.E.Wilson
- Myrcia neocambessedeana E.Lucas & Sobral
- Myrcia neocapitata K.Campbell & E.Lucas
- Myrcia neocaudata A.R.Lourenço & E.Lucas
- Myrcia neoclusiifolia A.R.Lourenço & E.Lucas
- Myrcia neocollina K.Campbell & Peguero
- Myrcia neocuprea E.Lucas & C.E.Wilson
- Myrcia neodimorpha E.Lucas & C.E.Wilson
- Myrcia neodoniana Mattos
- Myrcia neoelegans K.Campbell & K.Samra
- Myrcia neoestrellensis E.Lucas & C.E.Wilson
- Myrcia neoforsteri A.R.Lourenço & E.Lucas
- Myrcia neofusca A.R.Lourenço & E.Lucas
- Myrcia neoglabra E.Lucas & C.E.Wilson
- Myrcia neograndis K.Campbell & Peguero
- Myrcia neohernandezii A.R.Lourenço & Sánchez-Cháv.
- Myrcia neohotteana K.Campbell & Peguero
- Myrcia neoimperfecta E.Lucas & C.E.Wilson
- Myrcia neoinvolucrata K.Campbell & Peguero
- Myrcia neokiaerskovii E.Lucas & K.Samra
- Myrcia neolaevigata K.Campbell & Peguero
- Myrcia neolitoralis K.Campbell & Peguero
- Myrcia neolucida A.R.Lourenço & E.Lucas
- Myrcia neomacrocarpa A.R.Lourenço & E.Lucas
- Myrcia neomacrophylla E.Lucas & C.E.Wilson
- Myrcia neomcvaughii K.Campbell & E.Lucas
- Myrcia neomontana E.Lucas & C.E.Wilson
- Myrcia neomyrcioides K.Campbell & Peguero
- Myrcia neoobscura E.Lucas & C.E.Wilson
- Myrcia neooreophila E.Lucas & K.Samra
- Myrcia neopalustris K.Campbell & Peguero
- Myrcia neopauciflora Sobral
- Myrcia neopicardae K.Campbell & Peguero
- Myrcia neoregeliana E.Lucas & C.E.Wilson
- Myrcia neoriedeliana E.Lucas & C.E.Wilson
- Myrcia neorostrata Sobral
- Myrcia neorubella A.R.Lourenço & E.Lucas
- Myrcia neosalicifolia K.Campbell & Peguero
- Myrcia neoschomburgkiana E.Lucas & C.E.Wilson
- Myrcia neosintenisii K.Campbell & Peguero
- Myrcia neosmithii K.Campbell & K.Samra
- Myrcia neospeciosa A.R.Lourenço & E.Lucas
- Myrcia neospruceana E.Lucas & Sobral
- Myrcia neosuaveolens E.Lucas & C.E.Wilson
- Myrcia neothomasiana A.R.Lourenço & E.Lucas
- Myrcia neotovarensis E.Lucas & C.E.Wilson
- Myrcia neovelutina E.Lucas & C.E.Wilson
- Myrcia neovenulosa A.R.Lourenço & Sánchez-Cháv.
- Myrcia neoverticillaris E.Lucas & C.E.Wilson
- Myrcia neoyaquensis K.Campbell & Peguero
- Myrcia nervata (M.L.Kawas. & B.Holst) A.R.Lourenço & E.Lucas
- Myrcia nesiotica Z.Acosta & K.Samra
- Myrcia neuwiedeana (O.Berg) E.Lucas & C.E.Wilson
- Myrcia nigricans (O.Berg) N.Silveira
- Myrcia nipensis (Borhidi & O.Muñiz) Z.Acosta & K.Samra
- Myrcia nitida Cambess.
- Myrcia nivea Cambess.
- Myrcia nobilis O.Berg
- Myrcia nodosa (Urb.) K.Campbell & K.Samra
- Myrcia nubicola McVaugh
- Myrcia nummularia (O.Berg) K.Campbell & Peguero
- Myrcia oblanceolata (Urb.) Z.Acosta & K.Samra
- Myrcia oblongata DC.
- Myrcia oblongifolia (R.A.Howard) Z.Acosta & K.Samra
- Myrcia obovata (O.Berg) Nied.
- Myrcia obumbrans (O.Berg) McVaugh
- Myrcia obversa (D.Legrand) E.Lucas & C.E.Wilson
- Myrcia occulta Faria & E.Lucas
- Myrcia ochraciflora M.F.Santos
- Myrcia ochroides O.Berg
- Myrcia oligantha O.Berg
- Myrcia oligostemon (Urb.) Alain
- Myrcia oreophila M.A.D.Souza & Sobral
- Myrcia otocalyx Gaem & L.L.Santos
- Myrcia ottonis (O.Berg) Flickinger
- Myrcia ouropretoensis Kiaersk.
- Myrcia ovata Cambess.
- Myrcia ovina Proença & Landim
- Myrcia ovoidea (McVaugh) K.Campbell & K.Samra
- Myrcia paivae O.Berg
- Myrcia palustris DC.
- Myrcia panamensis B.Holst & M.L.Kawas.
- Myrcia panicularis (O.Berg) N.Silveira
- Myrcia paradoxa (Urb.) Z.Acosta & K.Samra
- Myrcia parca Sobral
- Myrcia parviantha Z.Acosta & K.Samra
- Myrcia parvifolia A.R.Lourenço & E.Lucas
- Myrcia paucantha Z.Acosta & K.Samra
- Myrcia paulii-jonesii Aguilar, D.Santam. & A.Estrada
- Myrcia paxillata (McVaugh) A.R.Lourenço & Sánchez-Cháv.
- Myrcia peduncularis (Alain) E.Lucas & Acev.-Rodr.
- Myrcia pendens A.R.Lourenço & Sánchez-Cháv.
- Myrcia pendula Sobral
- Myrcia peninsularis (Bisse) Z.Acosta & K.Samra
- Myrcia pentagona McVaugh
- Myrcia perforata O.Berg
- Myrcia perlaevigata (Lundell) A.R.Lourenço & Sánchez-Cháv.
- Myrcia pertusa DC.
- Myrcia petenensis (Lundell) A.R.Lourenço & Sánchez-Cháv.
- Myrcia petricola Z.Acosta & K.Samra
- Myrcia petrophila Sobral
- Myrcia picachoana (Urb. & Ekman) K.Campbell & Peguero
- Myrcia picardae Krug & Urb.
- Myrcia pileata (D.Legrand) A.R.Lourenço & E.Lucas
- Myrcia pineticola Borhidi & O.Muñiz
- Myrcia pinetorum (Britton & P.Wilson) Z.Acosta & K.Samra
- Myrcia pinifolia Cambess.
- Myrcia piptocalyx M.A.D.Souza & Sobral
- Myrcia pistrinalis McVaugh
- Myrcia pitoniana (Urb. & Ekman) K.Campbell & Peguero
- Myrcia pittieri (Standl.) A.R.Lourenço & Sánchez-Cháv.
- Myrcia platycaula Diels
- Myrcia platyclada DC.
- Myrcia platyphylla (O.Berg) A.R.Lourenço & E.Lucas
- Myrcia plicata (McVaugh) A.R.Lourenço & E.Lucas
- Myrcia plusiantha Kiaersk.
- Myrcia pocsiana (Borhidi) Z.Acosta & K.Samra
- Myrcia poeppigiana O.Berg
- Myrcia polyantha DC.
- Myrcia polygama (O.Berg) M.F.Santos
- Myrcia polyneura (Urb.) Borhidi
- Myrcia polysticta (Urb.) Z.Acosta & K.Samra
- Myrcia popayanensis Hieron.
- Myrcia porphyrea McVaugh
- Myrcia portoricensis (Britton) Cedeño-Mald. & Breckon ex F.S.Axelrod
- Myrcia pozasiana (Urb.) Z.Acosta & K.Samra
- Myrcia prismatica Gaem
- Myrcia proctorii (Acev.-Rodr.) Acev.-Rodr. & K.Campbell
- Myrcia proencana Villarroel & Bezerra
- Myrcia prolaxa Z.Acosta & K.Samra
- Myrcia protracta (Urb.) Z.Acosta & K.Samra
- Myrcia psammophila Gaem & Farroñay
- Myrcia pseudoapoda (Bisse & Am.Rodr.) Z.Acosta & K.Samra
- Myrcia pseudobrunneica (Parra-Os.) A.R.Lourenço & Parra-Os.
- Myrcia pseudomarlierea Sobral
- Myrcia pseudomoaensis (Borhidi & O.Muñiz) Z.Acosta & K.Samra
- Myrcia pseudopauciflora A.R.Lourenço & E.Lucas
- Myrcia pseudospectabilis Sobral
- Myrcia pseudosplendens Sobral & Mazine
- Myrcia pseudovenulosa Stadnik & Sobral
- Myrcia psilophylla Flickinger
- Myrcia ptariensis (Steyerm.) McVaugh
- Myrcia pteropoda (O.Berg) A.R.Lourenço & E.Lucas
- Myrcia pubescens DC.
- Myrcia pubiflora DC.
- Myrcia pubipetala Miq.
- Myrcia pudica (McVaugh) E.Lucas & C.E.Wilson
- Myrcia pulchella (DC.) A.R.Lourenço & E.Lucas
- Myrcia pullei (Burret ex Amshoff) A.R.Lourenço & E.Lucas
- Myrcia pulvinata B.S.Amorim
- Myrcia pyrifolia (Desv.) Nied.
- Myrcia quitarensis (Benth.) Sagot
- Myrcia racemosa (O.Berg) Kiaersk.
- Myrcia racemulosa DC.
- Myrcia ramageana Krug & Urb.
- Myrcia ramiflora Sobral, Rigueira & E.Lucas
- Myrcia raminfinita L.Marinho & E.Lucas
- Myrcia ramuliflora (O.Berg) N.Silveira
- Myrcia regnelliana O.Berg
- Myrcia reitzii (D.Legrand) Mazine
- Myrcia restingae (Sobral) A.R.Lourenço & E.Lucas
- Myrcia resupinata (Vell.) M.F.Santos
- Myrcia reticulata Cambess.
- Myrcia reticulosa Miq.
- Myrcia retivenia (C.Wright) Urb.
- Myrcia retorta Cambess.
- Myrcia retusa (O.Berg) Nied.
- Myrcia revolutifolia McVaugh
- Myrcia rhodophylla (Ekman & Urb.) Z.Acosta & K.Samra
- Myrcia riodocensis G.M.Barroso & Peixoto
- Myrcia riverae A.Estrada, D.Santam. & Aguilar
- Myrcia robusta Sobral
- Myrcia rogersiana B.S.Amorim
- Myrcia rosangelae NicLugh.
- Myrcia rotundata (Amshoff) McVaugh
- Myrcia rubiginosa Cambess.
- Myrcia rufipes DC.
- Myrcia rufipila McVaugh
- Myrcia rufopilosa M.F.Santos
- Myrcia rufotomentosa (McVaugh) K.Campbell & E.Lucas
- Myrcia rugosior (McVaugh) E.Lucas & C.E.Wilson
- Myrcia ruiziana (O.Berg) A.R.Lourenço & Parra-Os.
- Myrcia rupestris M.F.Santos
- Myrcia rupicola D.Legrand
- Myrcia rupta M.L.Kawas. & B.Holst
- Myrcia ruschii B.S.Amorim
- Myrcia salamensis (Lundell) A.R.Lourenço & Sánchez-Cháv.
- Myrcia saliana Alain
- Myrcia salicifolia DC.
- Myrcia salticola (Steyerm.) McVaugh
- Myrcia salzmannii O.Berg
- Myrcia samuelssonii (Urb. & Ekman) K.Campbell & Peguero
- Myrcia sanisidrensis Steyerm.
- Myrcia santalucia (Sobral) A.R.Lourenço & E.Lucas
- Myrcia santateresana Sobral
- Myrcia saxatilis (Amshoff) McVaugh
- Myrcia schlechtendaliana (O.Berg) A.R.Lourenço & Sánchez-Cháv.
- Myrcia schottiana O.Berg
- Myrcia schottii (D.Legrand) M.F.Santos
- Myrcia scoparia (O.Berg) A.R.Lourenço & E.Lucas
- Myrcia scytophylla (Diels) E.Lucas & C.E.Wilson
- Myrcia selleana (Urb. & Ekman) K.Campbell & Peguero
- Myrcia selloi (Spreng.) N.Silveira
- Myrcia sericea G.Don
- Myrcia serrana B.S.Amorim
- Myrcia servata McVaugh
- Myrcia sessiliflora McVaugh
- Myrcia sessilis (McVaugh) A.R.Lourenço & Parra-Os.
- Myrcia sessilissima M.F.Santos
- Myrcia siberiensis (Villarroel, M.Nee & Proença) K.Campbell & E.Lucas
- Myrcia simulata (McVaugh) A.R.Lourenço & Parra-Os.
- Myrcia sintenisiana M.F.Santos
- Myrcia sipapensis McVaugh
- Myrcia skeldingii Proctor
- Myrcia skortzoviana (Mattos) E.Lucas & C.E.Wilson
- Myrcia solitaria (Sobral, O.T.Aguiar & Antunes) A.R.Lourenço & E.Lucas
- Myrcia sordida (Urb. & Ekman) K.Campbell & Peguero
- Myrcia sororopanensis Steyerm.
- Myrcia sparsiflora (M.L.Kawas. & B.Holst) A.R.Lourenço & E.Lucas
- Myrcia spathulifolia Proença
- Myrcia speciosa (Amshoff) McVaugh
- Myrcia spectabilis DC.
- Myrcia spicata (Amshoff) A.R.Lourenço & E.Lucas
- Myrcia spinifolia Borhidi & O.Muñiz
- Myrcia splendens (Sw.) DC.
- Myrcia sporadosticta Kiaersk.
- Myrcia sprengeliana O.Berg
- Myrcia springiana (O.Berg) Kiaersk.
- Myrcia squamata (Mattos & D.Legrand) Mattos
- Myrcia stenocarpa Krug & Urb.
- Myrcia stenocymbia Diels
- Myrcia stewartiana O.Berg
- Myrcia sticta Sobral & M.A.D.Souza
- Myrcia stictophylla (O.Berg) N.Silveira
- Myrcia stigmatosa O.Berg
- Myrcia straminea (B.Holst) A.R.Lourenço & E.Lucas
- Myrcia stricta (O.Berg) Kiaersk.
- Myrcia strigipes Mart.
- Myrcia strigosa A.R.Lourenço & E.Lucas
- Myrcia styphelantha A.R.Lourenço & E.Lucas
- Myrcia subacuminata (Kiaersk.) M.F.Santos
- Myrcia subalpestris DC.
- Myrcia subavenia (O.Berg) N.Silveira
- Myrcia subcapitata (Urb.) Z.Acosta & K.Samra
- Myrcia subcordata DC.
- Myrcia subcordifolia B.Holst & M.L.Kawas.
- Myrcia suberosa M.F.Santos & T.Fern.
- Myrcia subglabra McVaugh
- Myrcia subobliqua (O.Berg) Nied.
- Myrcia suborbicularis (McVaugh) E.Lucas & C.E.Wilson
- Myrcia subsericea A.Gray
- Myrcia subsessilis O.Berg
- Myrcia subterminalis M.F.Santos
- Myrcia subulata (McVaugh) E.Lucas & C.E.Wilson
- Myrcia sucrei (G.M.Barroso & Peixoto) E.Lucas & C.E.Wilson
- Myrcia suffruticosa O.Berg
- Myrcia summa (McVaugh) M.F.Santos
- Myrcia susannae Borhidi
- Myrcia sylvatica (G.Mey.) DC.
- Myrcia symmetrica M.A.D.Souza & Sobral
- Myrcia tafelbergica Amshoff
- Myrcia tarauacana M.A.D.Souza & Sobral
- Myrcia teimosa Sobral
- Myrcia tenuiclada Z.Acosta & K.Samra
- Myrcia tenuifolia (O.Berg) Sobral
- Myrcia tenuipes (McVaugh) A.R.Lourenço & Sánchez-Cháv.
- Myrcia tenuivenosa Kiaersk.
- Myrcia tepuiensis Steyerm.
- Myrcia teresensis NicLugh.
- Myrcia terniflora (Urb. & Ekman) K.Campbell & Peguero
- Myrcia tessmannii (Burret ex McVaugh) A.R.Lourenço & E.Lucas
- Myrcia tetraloba D.F.Lima & E.Lucas
- Myrcia tetraphylla Sobral
- Myrcia tetraptera (O.Berg) A.R.Lourenço & E.Lucas
- Myrcia teuscheriana (O.Berg) M.F.Santos
- Myrcia thomasiana DC.
- Myrcia thomasii B.S.Amorim & A.R.Lourenço
- Myrcia thyrsoidea O.Berg
- Myrcia tiburoniana Urb. & Ekman
- Myrcia tijucensis Kiaersk.
- Myrcia toaensis Borhidi & O.Muñiz
- Myrcia tomentosa (Aubl.) DC.
- Myrcia tonii (Lundell) A.R.Lourenço & Sánchez-Cháv.
- Myrcia torta DC.
- Myrcia tortuosa (O.Berg) N.Silveira
- Myrcia tovarensis O.Berg
- Myrcia tresantha E.Lucas & Acev.-Rodr.
- Myrcia trichantha (Wawra) Sobral
- Myrcia tricona (D.Legrand) A.R.Lourenço & E.Lucas
- Myrcia tridymantha (Diels) A.R.Lourenço & E.Lucas
- Myrcia trimera E.Lucas & Sobral
- Myrcia truncata Sobral
- Myrcia tumida Sobral
- Myrcia tumidonodia (Schery) A.R.Lourenço & Parra-Os.
- Myrcia tussaciana (O.Berg) K.Campbell & K.Samra
- Myrcia tylophylla A.R.Lourenço & Sánchez-Cháv.
- Myrcia tytthoflora Z.Acosta & K.Samra
- Myrcia uaioai Sobral & M.A.D.Souza
- Myrcia ubatubana Mazine & Sobral
- Myrcia uberavensis O.Berg
- Myrcia umbelliformis (Krug & Urb.) K.Campbell & K.Samra
- Myrcia umbraticola (Kunth) E.Lucas & C.E.Wilson
- Myrcia unana Sobral, Faria & Villaroel
- Myrcia uncinata A.R.Lourenço & E.Lucas
- Myrcia undulata O.Berg
- Myrcia uniflora (McVaugh) E.Lucas & C.E.Wilson
- Myrcia urbaniana (Burret) Flickinger
- Myrcia valenzuelana (A.Rich.) Griseb.
- Myrcia variabilis DC.
- Myrcia vattimoi Mattos
- Myrcia vauthiereana O.Berg
- Myrcia velloziana O.Berg
- Myrcia vellozoi Mazine
- Myrcia velutiflora (Mattos & D.Legrand) Mattos
- Myrcia venosissima Sobral & P.L.Viana
- Myrcia ventuarensis (B.Holst) E.Lucas & C.E.Wilson
- Myrcia venulosa DC.
- Myrcia verrucosa Sobral
- Myrcia verticillaris O.Berg
- Myrcia verticillata M.L.Kawas. & B.Holst
- Myrcia vestita DC.
- Myrcia vexata (McVaugh) K.Campbell & K.Samra
- Myrcia virgata Cambess.
- Myrcia vittoriana Kiaersk.
- Myrcia warmingiana Kiaersk.
- Myrcia websteri (B.Holst & M.L.Kawas.) A.R.Lourenço & E.Lucas
- Myrcia wilsonii (Griseb.) K.Campbell & K.Samra
- Myrcia woodburyi (Alain) E.Lucas & Acev.-Rodr.
- Myrcia xylopioides (Kunth) DC.
- Myrcia yaraensis (Urb.) Z.Acosta & K.Samra
- Myrcia yasuniana (M.L.Kawas. & Á.J.Pérez) A.R.Lourenço & E.Lucas
- Myrcia zanquinensis (Ant.Molina) A.R.Lourenço & Sánchez-Cháv.
- Myrcia zetekiana (Standl.) B.Holst
- Myrcia zuzygium (L.) A.R.Lourenço & E.Lucas
