= Mitranthes =

Former genus of flowering plants

Mitranthes is a formerly accepted genus of plant in the family Myrtaceae. It was described as a genus in 1856. As of September 2021, it is regarded by Plants of the World Online as a synonym of the genus Psidium, although many of its former species have been moved to the genus Myrcia.

Former species include:

- Mitranthes clarendonensis (Proctor) Proctor → Myrcia clarendonensis
- Mitranthes macrophylla Proctor → Myrcia asperorum
- Mitranthes nivea Proctor → Myrcia chionantha
