= Monte Pirata (Vieques) =

Mountain in Vieques, Puerto Rico

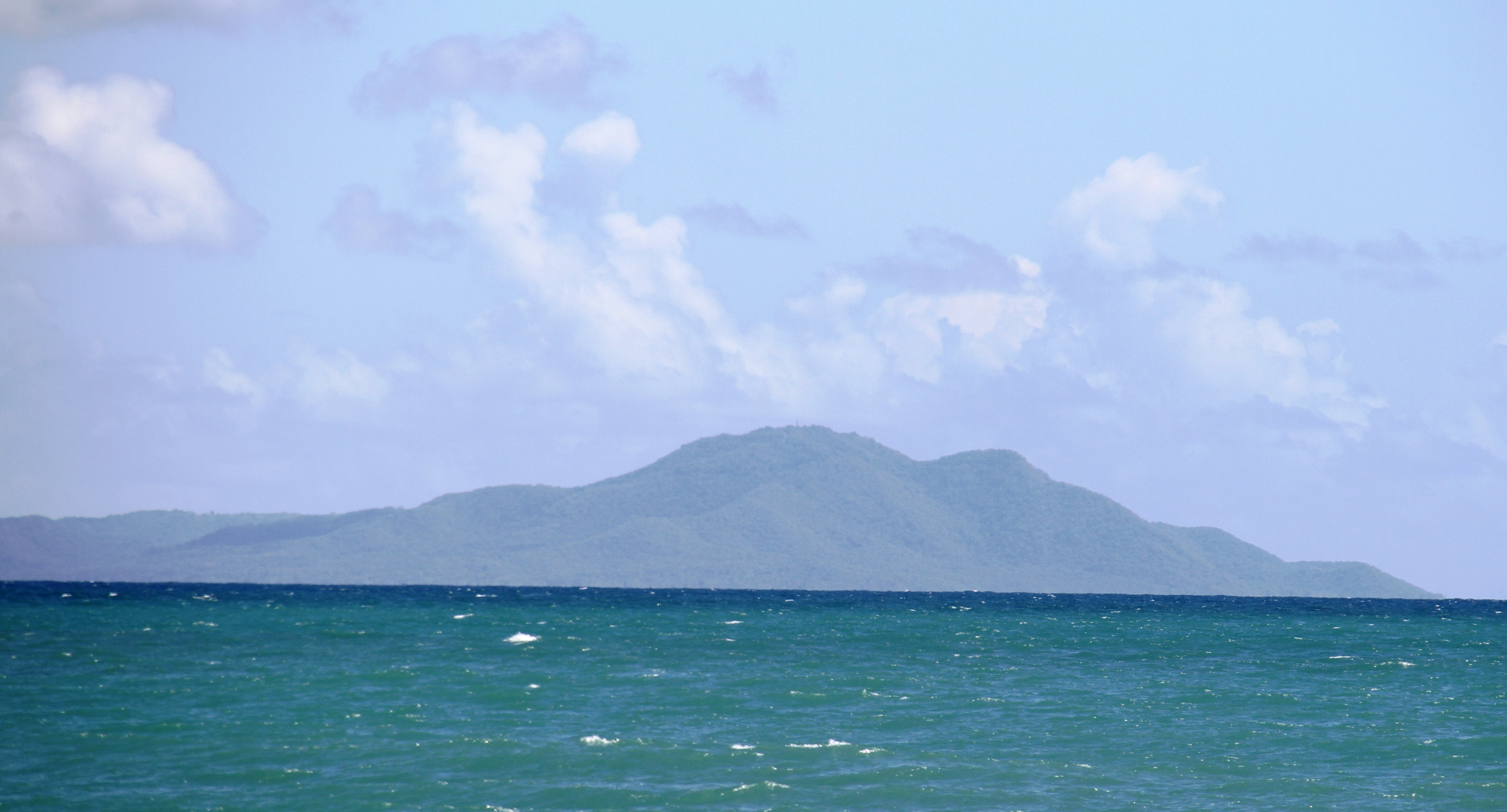
- Monte Pirata and the southeastern coast of Vieques as seen from Puerto Rico.

Highest point
- Elevation: 960 ft (290 m)
- Prominence: 960 ft (290 m)
- Coordinates: 18°05′35″N 65°33′04″W

Naming
- Etymology: "pirate mountain" in Spanish

Geography
- Location: Vieques, Puerto Rico

Climbing
- Easiest route: Hike

Monte Pirata (Spanish for "pirate mountain"), at 960 feet (290 m) of elevation, is the highest mountain in the island of Vieques. The mountain is located in the western portion of the Vieques National Wildlife Refuge and it is the site of an old US Navy communications site, now operated by the Department of Homeland Security]. Hiking used to be permitted in the mountain, and there is a trail (Mount Pirata Trail) leads to the summit. Although the main trail has been closed to the general public for the past 20 years, an observation platform is being installed and currently there is interest in revitalizing and reopening the entire area.

The mountain is also home to the endangered myrtle, the Thomas' lidflower (Calyptranthes thomasiana), which is only found in this mountain, in addition to Bordeaux Mountain on St. John and Gorda Peak on Virgin Gorda, in the United States and British Virgin Islands respectively.

== See also ==
- Vieques National Wildlife Refuge, part of the Caribbean Islands National Wildlife Refuge Complex
