= Myrciaria silveirana =

Conservation status
- Vulnerable (IUCN 2.3)

Scientific classification
- Kingdom: Plantae
- Clade: Tracheophytes
- Clade: Angiosperms
- Clade: Eudicots
- Clade: Rosids
- Order: Myrtales
- Family: Myrtaceae
- Genus: Myrciaria
- Species: M. silveirana

Binomial name
- Myrciaria silveirana D.Legrand

Species of flowering plant

Myrciaria silveirana is a species of flowering plant in the family Myrtaceae. It is a tree endemic to the Atlantic Forest of southern Brazil.

== Taxonomy ==
Myrciaria silveirana was first described by C. M. D. E. Legrand in 1977. It has been regarded as a synonym of Myrcia guianensis, but its description and type do not match the clade to which M. guianensis belongs. As of September 2021, the World Checklist of Selected Plant Families regards it as an unplaced name.
