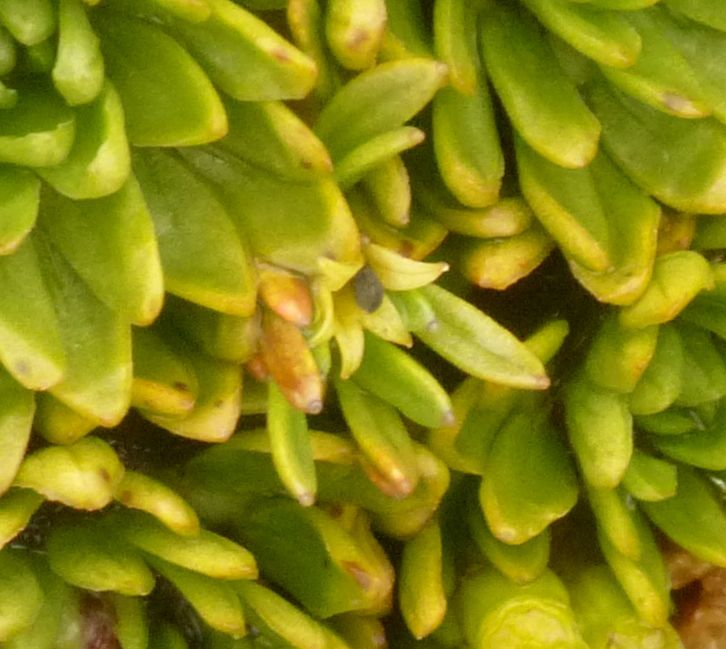
- Lysipomia aretioides

Scientific classification
- Kingdom: Plantae
- Clade: Tracheophytes
- Clade: Angiosperms
- Clade: Eudicots
- Clade: Asterids
- Order: Asterales
- Family: Campanulaceae
- Subfamily: Lobelioideae
- Genus: Lysipomia; Kunth

= Lysipomia =

Genus of flowering plants

Lysipomia is a genus of flowering plants in the family Campanulaceae. They are cushion-like mountain plants all endemic to the high Andes. The genus is monophyletic.

There are about 40 described species. There are about 10 more recognized taxa not yet described to science.

Described species include:

- Lysipomia acaulis Kunth
- Lysipomia aretioides Kunth
- Lysipomia bilineata McVaugh
- Lysipomia bourgonii Ernst
- Lysipomia brachysiphonia (Zahlbr.) E.Wimm.
- Lysipomia caespitosa T.J.Ayers
- Lysipomia crassomarginata (E.Wimm.) Jeppesen
- Lysipomia cuspidata McVaugh
- Lysipomia cylindrocarpa T.J.Ayers
- Lysipomia glandulifera (Wedd.) Schltr & E.Wimm.
- Lysipomia globularis E.Wimm.
- Lysipomia gracilis (E.Wimm) E.Wimm
- Lysipomia hirta E.Wimm.
- Lysipomia hutchinsonii McVaugh
- Lysipomia laciniata A.DC.
- Lysipomia laricina E.Wimm.
- Lysipomia lehmannii Hieron. ex Zahlbr.
- Lysipomia mitsyae Sylvester & D.Quandt
- Lysipomia montioides Kunth
- Lysipomia multiflora McVaugh
- Lysipomia muscoides Hook.f.
- Lysipomia oblinqua E.Wimm., 1048
- Lysipomia oellgaardii Jeppesen
- Lysipomia petrosa T.J.Ayers
- Lysipomia pumila (Wedd.)E.Wimm.
- Lysipomia repens F.Phil.
- Lysipomia rhizomata McVaugh
- Lysipomia sparrei Jeppesen
- Lysipomia speciosa T.J.Ayers
- Lysipomia sphagnophila Griseb. ex Wedd.
- Lysipomia subpetata McVaugh
- Lysipomia tubulosa McVaugh
- Lysipomia vitreola McVaugh
- Lysipomia wurdackii McVaugh
