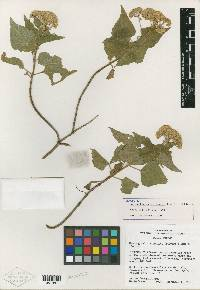

Scientific classification
- Kingdom: Plantae
- Clade: Tracheophytes
- Clade: Angiosperms
- Clade: Eudicots
- Clade: Asterids
- Order: Asterales
- Family: Asteraceae
- Subfamily: Asteroideae
- Tribe: Eupatorieae
- Genus: Macvaughiella; R.M.King & H.Rob.

Type species
- Schaetzellia mexicana Sch.Bip.

Synonyms
- Schaetzellia Sch.Bip. 1850, illegitimate homonym not Klotzsch 1849; Dichaeta Sch.Bip 1850, illegitimate homonym not Nutt. 1841

= Macvaughiella =

Genus of flowering plants

Macvaughiella is a genus of Mesoamerican flowering plants in the tribe Eupatorieae within the family Asteraceae.

The genus is named in honor of the American botanist Rogers McVaugh (1909-2009) formerly of the University of Michigan.

Species

- Macvaughiella chiapensis R.M.King & H.Rob. - El Salvador, Chiapas
- Macvaughiella mexicana (Sch.Bip.) R.M.King & H.Rob. - Veracruz, El Salvador, Oaxaca, Honduras, Chiapas
