= Lysipomia vitreola =

Conservation status
- Endangered (IUCN 3.1)

Scientific classification
- Kingdom: Plantae
- Clade: Tracheophytes
- Clade: Angiosperms
- Clade: Eudicots
- Clade: Asterids
- Order: Asterales
- Family: Campanulaceae
- Genus: Lysipomia
- Species: L. vitreola

Binomial name
- Lysipomia vitreola McVaugh

Species of flowering plant

Lysipomia vitreola is a species of flowering plant in the family Campanulaceae. It is endemic to the Azuay Province of Ecuador, where it grows in páramo habitat in the Andes. There are three known subpopulations.
