= Lysipomia tubulosa =

Conservation status
- Endangered (IUCN 3.1)

Scientific classification
- Kingdom: Plantae
- Clade: Tracheophytes
- Clade: Angiosperms
- Clade: Eudicots
- Clade: Asterids
- Order: Asterales
- Family: Campanulaceae
- Genus: Lysipomia
- Species: L. tubulosa

Binomial name
- Lysipomia tubulosa McVaugh

Species of flowering plant

Lysipomia tubulosa is a species of flowering plant in the family Campanulaceae endemic to Ecuador, known to be from the forest and the páramo habitat in the high Andes. It has only been collected twice, most recently over 60 years ago. It is threatened by habitat destruction.
