= Myrcia johnstonii =

Conservation status
- Critically endangered, possibly extinct (IUCN 3.1)

Scientific classification
- Kingdom: Plantae
- Clade: Tracheophytes
- Clade: Angiosperms
- Clade: Eudicots
- Clade: Rosids
- Order: Myrtales
- Family: Myrtaceae
- Genus: Myrcia
- Species: M. johnstonii

Binomial name
- Myrcia johnstonii (McVaugh) A.R.Lourenço & Parra-Os.

Synonyms
- Calyptranthes johnstonii McVaugh

Species of flowering plant

Myrcia johnstonii is a species of flowering plant in the family Myrtaceae. It is a shrub or tree endemic to Panama. It is also known as Calyptranthes johnstonii McVaugh (basionym).
