= Myrcia margarettae =

Conservation status
- Critically Endangered (IUCN 3.1)

Scientific classification
- Kingdom: Plantae
- Clade: Tracheophytes
- Clade: Angiosperms
- Clade: Eudicots
- Clade: Rosids
- Order: Myrtales
- Family: Myrtaceae
- Genus: Myrcia
- Species: M. margarettae

Binomial name
- Myrcia margarettae (Alain) Alain

Synonyms
- Eugenia margarettae Alain

Species of plant

Myrcia margarettae is a species of shrub or tree in the family Myrtaceae. It is endemic to Puerto Rico. It reaches a height of 4–5 metres.
