= Lysipomia crassomarginata =

Conservation status
- Endangered (IUCN 3.1)

Scientific classification
- Kingdom: Plantae
- Clade: Tracheophytes
- Clade: Angiosperms
- Clade: Eudicots
- Clade: Asterids
- Order: Asterales
- Family: Campanulaceae
- Genus: Lysipomia
- Species: L. crassomarginata

Binomial name
- Lysipomia crassomarginata (E.Wimm.) Jeppesen

Species of flowering plant

Lysipomia crassomarginata is a species of plant in the family Campanulaceae. It is endemic to Ecuador. Its natural habitat is subtropical or tropical high-altitude grassland.
