= Myrcia pendula =

Conservation status
- Endangered (IUCN 3.1)

Scientific classification
- Kingdom: Plantae
- Clade: Tracheophytes
- Clade: Angiosperms
- Clade: Eudicots
- Clade: Rosids
- Order: Myrtales
- Family: Myrtaceae
- Genus: Myrcia
- Species: M. pendula

Binomial name
- Myrcia pendula Sobral

Species of plant in the myrtle family

Myrcia pendula is a species of flowering plant in the family Myrtaceae. It is a tree endemic to rainforest habitats in south-east Bahia, Brazil, at 600 to 700 metres (2,000 to 2,300 ft) above sea level. The species was first described in 2010 and grows to between 3 and 15 metres (9.8 and 49 ft) tall.
