= Myrcia crassa =

Conservation status
- Endangered (IUCN 3.1)

Scientific classification
- Kingdom: Plantae
- Clade: Tracheophytes
- Clade: Angiosperms
- Clade: Eudicots
- Clade: Rosids
- Order: Myrtales
- Family: Myrtaceae
- Genus: Myrcia
- Species: M. crassa

Binomial name
- Myrcia crassa Sobral

Species of plant in the myrtle family

Myrcia crassa is a species of flowering plant in the family Myrtaceae. It is a tree endemic to the municipality of Santa Teresa, Espírito Santo, Brazil, where its habitat is fragmented and declining due to deforestation. The tree was first described in 2010 and grows to between 1.5 and 18 metres (4.9 and 59 ft) tall.
