= Myrcia ascendens =

Conservation status
- Critically Endangered (IUCN 3.1)

Scientific classification
- Kingdom: Plantae
- Clade: Tracheophytes
- Clade: Angiosperms
- Clade: Eudicots
- Clade: Rosids
- Order: Myrtales
- Family: Myrtaceae
- Genus: Myrcia
- Species: M. ascendens

Binomial name
- Myrcia ascendens M.F.Santos

Species of plant in the myrtle family

Myrcia ascendens is a species of plant in the family Myrtaceae. It is a shrub endemic to Bahia in north-east Brazil. It was described in 2015.

== Etymology ==
The species name refers to the growth pattern of the plant's branches, which are predominantly held upright.

== Description ==
Myrcia ascendens is a shrub or small tree that typically grows between 1 and 3 metres (3 ft 3 in and 9 ft 10 in) in height. Its leaves can reach up to 16 mm (0.63 in) in length and 5 mm (0.20 in) in width. The fruits are red, up to 6mm in diameter, and contain up to two seeds.

== Distribution ==
This species has been recorded only on rock outcrops near rivers, within the municipal park of Mucugê, and the Serra de São Pedro.

== Conservation status ==
Myrcia ascendens is classified as Critically Endangered due to its limited distribution.
