= Myrcia poeppigiana =

Conservation status
- Endangered (IUCN 3.1)

Scientific classification
- Kingdom: Plantae
- Clade: Tracheophytes
- Clade: Angiosperms
- Clade: Eudicots
- Clade: Rosids
- Order: Myrtales
- Family: Myrtaceae
- Genus: Myrcia
- Species: M. poeppigiana

Binomial name
- Myrcia poeppigiana O.Berg

Species of flowering plant

Myrcia poeppigiana is a species of flowering plant in the family Myrtaceae. It is a shrub or tree native to the Amazon basin of northern Brazil and Peru. It grows in lowland forests from 300 to 700 metres elevation, and is known from the Mato Grosso tropical dry forests, Monte Alegre várzea, Purus várzea, Southwest Amazon moist forests, Peruvian Yungas, and Ucayali moist forests ecoregions.
