= Myrcia fasciata =

Conservation status
- Vulnerable (IUCN 3.1)

Scientific classification
- Kingdom: Plantae
- Clade: Tracheophytes
- Clade: Angiosperms
- Clade: Eudicots
- Clade: Rosids
- Order: Myrtales
- Family: Myrtaceae
- Genus: Myrcia
- Species: M. fasciata

Binomial name
- Myrcia fasciata McVaugh

Species of flowering plant

Myrcia fasciata is a species of plant in the family Myrtaceae. It is endemic to Ecuador.
