= Myrcia pseudomarlierea =

Conservation status
- Vulnerable (IUCN 3.1)

Scientific classification
- Kingdom: Plantae
- Clade: Tracheophytes
- Clade: Angiosperms
- Clade: Eudicots
- Clade: Rosids
- Order: Myrtales
- Family: Myrtaceae
- Genus: Myrcia
- Species: M. pseudomarlierea

Binomial name
- Myrcia pseudomarlierea Sobral

Species of plant in the myrtle family

Myrcia pseudomarlierea is a species of plant in the family Myrtaceae. It is endemic to coastal rainforest habitats in southern Bahia, Brazil. The tree was first described in 2010, grows to between 4 and 20 metres (13 and 66 ft) tall, and produces red fruits between 12 and 15 mm (0.47 and 0.59 in) in diameter.
