= Myrcia mucugensis =

Conservation status
- Critically Endangered (IUCN 3.1)

Scientific classification
- Kingdom: Plantae
- Clade: Tracheophytes
- Clade: Angiosperms
- Clade: Eudicots
- Clade: Rosids
- Order: Myrtales
- Family: Myrtaceae
- Genus: Myrcia
- Species: M. mucugensis

Binomial name
- Myrcia mucugensis Sobral

Species of plant in the myrtle family

Myrcia mucugensis is a species of flowering plant in the family Myrtaceae. It is endemic to Campos rupestres habitats in central Bahia, Brazil, 800 to 1,000 metres (2,600 to 3,300 ft) above sea level. The shrub was first described in 2010 and grows to between 1.5 and 2 metres (4 ft 11 in and 6 ft 7 in) tall, with 2 mm diameter fruits.
