= Myrcia luquillensis =

Conservation status
- Vulnerable (IUCN 2.3)

Scientific classification
- Kingdom: Plantae
- Clade: Tracheophytes
- Clade: Angiosperms
- Clade: Eudicots
- Clade: Rosids
- Order: Myrtales
- Family: Myrtaceae
- Genus: Myrcia
- Species: M. luquillensis

Binomial name
- Myrcia luquillensis (Alain) E.Lucas & A.R.Lourenço

Synonyms
- Calyptranthes luquillensis Alain

Species of plant

Myrcia luquillensis, the Luquillo forest lidflower, is a species of flowering plant in the family Myrtaceae. It is endemic to Puerto Rico.
