= Myrcia albobrunnea =

Conservation status
- Data Deficient (IUCN 3.1)

Scientific classification
- Kingdom: Plantae
- Clade: Tracheophytes
- Clade: Angiosperms
- Clade: Eudicots
- Clade: Rosids
- Order: Myrtales
- Family: Myrtaceae
- Genus: Myrcia
- Species: M. albobrunnea

Binomial name
- Myrcia albobrunnea McVaugh

Species of plant

Myrcia albobrunnea is a species of flowering plant in the family Myrtaceae. It is a tree endemic to Peru.
