= Myrcia costeira =

Conservation status
- Least Concern (IUCN 3.1)

Scientific classification
- Kingdom: Plantae
- Clade: Tracheophytes
- Clade: Angiosperms
- Clade: Eudicots
- Clade: Rosids
- Order: Myrtales
- Family: Myrtaceae
- Genus: Myrcia
- Species: M. costeira

Binomial name
- Myrcia costeira M.F.Santos

Species of plant in the myrtle family

Myrcia costeira is a species of plant in the family Myrtaceae, endemic to the south and south-east of Brazil, and first described in 2015.

== Etymology ==
The species name refers its coastal forest habitat.

== Description ==
Myrcia costeira is a tree that grows to between 2 and 12 metres (6.6 and 39 ft) tall. Leaves grow up to 5.4 cm (2.1 in) long and 2.7 cm (1.1 in) wide. Fruits are red, up to 10 mm wide with up to 3 seeds.

== Distribution ==
This plant occurs in atlantic forests, between São Paulo (state) and Rio Grande do Sul.

== Conservation status ==
Myrcia costeira is considered to be vulnerable due to threats to its habitat from urbanisation. The IUCN Red List assesses the species as Least Concern.
