= Myrcia rupestris =

Conservation status
- Endangered (IUCN 3.1)

Scientific classification
- Kingdom: Plantae
- Clade: Tracheophytes
- Clade: Angiosperms
- Clade: Eudicots
- Clade: Rosids
- Order: Myrtales
- Family: Myrtaceae
- Genus: Myrcia
- Species: M. rupestris

Binomial name
- Myrcia rupestris M.F.Santos

Species of plant in the myrtle family

Myrcia rupestris is a species of flowering plant in the family Myrtaceae. It is a shrub endemic to Minas Gerais state in southeastern Brazil which was first described in 2015.

== Etymology ==
The species name refers to the plant's rocky habitat.

== Description ==
Myrcia rupestris is a shrub or small tree that grows to between 0.5 and 3 metres (1 ft 8 in and 9 ft 10 in) tall. Leaves grow up to 26 mm (1.0 in) long and 9 mm wide. Fruits grow up to 5 mm wide with up to 2 seeds.

== Distribution ==
This plant has only been found on rock outcrops in Minas Gerais.

== Conservation status ==
Myrcia rupestris is considered to be endangered due to its limited distribution.
