= Myrcia pseudospectabilis =

Conservation status
- Endangered (IUCN 3.1)

Scientific classification
- Kingdom: Plantae
- Clade: Embryophytes
- Clade: Tracheophytes
- Clade: Spermatophytes
- Clade: Angiosperms
- Clade: Eudicots
- Clade: Rosids
- Order: Myrtales
- Family: Myrtaceae
- Genus: Myrcia
- Species: M. pseudospectabilis

Binomial name
- Myrcia pseudospectabilis Sobral

Species of plant in the myrtle family

Myrcia pseudospectabilis is a species of plant in the family Myrtaceae. It is endemic to coastal rainforest habitats in southern Bahia, Brazil. The tree was first described in 2010, grows to between 1 and 6 metres (3.3 and 20 ft) tall, and produces purple or black fruits between 10 and 12 mm in diameter.
