= Myrcia neoyaquensis =

Scientific classification
- Kingdom: Plantae
- Clade: Embryophytes
- Clade: Tracheophytes
- Clade: Spermatophytes
- Clade: Angiosperms
- Clade: Eudicots
- Clade: Rosids
- Order: Myrtales
- Family: Myrtaceae
- Genus: Myrcia
- Species: M. neoyaquensis

Binomial name
- Myrcia neoyaquensis K.Campbell & Peguero

Synonyms
- Calyptranthes yaquensis Urb. & Ekman

Species of plant in the myrtle family

Myrcia neoyaquensis is a species of flowering plant in the family Myrtaceae, native to the Dominican Republic. A shrub reaching 3.5 m (11 ft), it is typically found growing at elevations of 1,300–1,600 m (4,300–5,200 ft).
