= Myrcia subterminalis =

Conservation status
- Vulnerable (IUCN 3.1)

Scientific classification
- Kingdom: Plantae
- Clade: Tracheophytes
- Clade: Angiosperms
- Clade: Eudicots
- Clade: Rosids
- Order: Myrtales
- Family: Myrtaceae
- Genus: Myrcia
- Species: M. subterminalis

Binomial name
- Myrcia subterminalis M.F.Santos

Species of plant in the myrtle family

Myrcia subterminalis is a species of plant in the family Myrtaceae, endemic to the east of Brazil, and first described in 2015.

== Etymology ==
The species name refers to the plant's subterminal clusters of flowers.

== Description ==
Myrcia subterminalis is a tree that grows to between 3 and 15 metres (9.8 and 49 ft) tall. Leaves grow up to 14.5 cm (5.7 in) long and 5.9 cm (2.3 in) wide. Fruits are red with translucent spots, and up to 7 mm wide, with up to 2 seeds.

== Distribution ==
This plant is found in mountain atlantic forests and semideciduous forests in Alagoas, Bahia, Espírito Santo, and Minas Gerais.

== Conservation status ==
Myrcia subterminalis is considered to be vulnerable due to its distribution and threatened habitat.
