= Lysipomia acaulis =

Conservation status
- Vulnerable (IUCN 3.1)

Scientific classification
- Kingdom: Plantae
- Clade: Tracheophytes
- Clade: Angiosperms
- Clade: Eudicots
- Clade: Asterids
- Order: Asterales
- Family: Campanulaceae
- Genus: Lysipomia
- Species: L. acaulis

Binomial name
- Lysipomia acaulis Kunth

Species of flowering plant

Lysipomia acaulis is a species of flowering plant in the family Campanulaceae. It is endemic to Ecuador, where it occurs in the high Andes. Its habitat includes mountain forest and páramo. There are five known subpopulations. It grows on the slopes of the volcano Cotopaxi.
