= Myrcia tetraphylla =

Conservation status
- Vulnerable (IUCN 3.1)

Scientific classification
- Kingdom: Plantae
- Clade: Tracheophytes
- Clade: Angiosperms
- Clade: Eudicots
- Clade: Rosids
- Order: Myrtales
- Family: Myrtaceae
- Genus: Myrcia
- Species: M. tetraphylla

Binomial name
- Myrcia tetraphylla Sobral

Species of plant in the myrtle family

Myrcia tetraphylla is a species of plant in the family Myrtaceae. It is endemic to coastal rainforest habitats in southern Bahia, Brazil. The tree was first described in 2010, grows to between 2 and 8 metres (6.6 and 26 ft) tall, and produces purple fruits between 15 and 22 mm (0.59 and 0.87 in) in diameter.
