= Myrcia floridissima =

Conservation status
- Vulnerable (IUCN 3.1)

Scientific classification
- Kingdom: Plantae
- Clade: Tracheophytes
- Clade: Angiosperms
- Clade: Eudicots
- Clade: Rosids
- Order: Myrtales
- Family: Myrtaceae
- Genus: Myrcia
- Species: M. floridissima

Binomial name
- Myrcia floridissima Sobral

Species of plant in the myrtle family

Myrcia floridissima is a species of flowering plant in the family Myrtaceae. It is a tree endemic to the Atlantic rainforest of eastern Minas Gerais, Brazil, where its habitat is fragmented and declining due to deforestation. The tree was first described in 2010 and grows up to 6 metres (20 ft) tall.
