= Myrcia crebra =

Conservation status
- Least Concern (IUCN 3.1)

Scientific classification
- Kingdom: Plantae
- Clade: Tracheophytes
- Clade: Angiosperms
- Clade: Eudicots
- Clade: Rosids
- Order: Myrtales
- Family: Myrtaceae
- Genus: Myrcia
- Species: M. crebra

Binomial name
- Myrcia crebra (McVaugh) A.R.Lourenço & E.Lucas

Synonyms
- Calyptranthes crebra McVaugh

Species of plant

Myrcia crebra is a species of flowering plant in the family Myrtaceae. It is a tree native to tropical South America, ranging from northern and west-central Brazil to Venezuela, northern Peru, and eastern Bolivia.
