= Myrcia brevispicata =

Conservation status
- Least Concern (IUCN 3.1)

Scientific classification
- Kingdom: Plantae
- Clade: Tracheophytes
- Clade: Angiosperms
- Clade: Eudicots
- Clade: Rosids
- Order: Myrtales
- Family: Myrtaceae
- Genus: Myrcia
- Species: M. brevispicata

Binomial name
- Myrcia brevispicata (McVaugh) K.Campbell & E.Lucas

Synonyms
- Calyptranthes brevispicata McVaugh

Species of plant

Myrcia brevispicata is a species of flowering plant in the family Myrtaceae. It is a shrub or tree native to northern Brazil, French Guiana, and Peru. It can grow up to 15 metres tall. It grows in lowland Amazon rainforest from 70 to 950 metres elevation, and was recently observed in the Western Ecuador moist forests on Ecuador's Pacific slope between 800 and 1,200 metres elevation.

The species was first described as Calyptranthes brevispicata by Rogers McVaugh in 1956. In 2019 Keron Campbell and Eve Lucas placed the species in genus Myrcia as M. brevisipicata.
