= Myrcia simulata =

Conservation status
- Least Concern (IUCN 3.1)

Scientific classification
- Kingdom: Plantae
- Clade: Tracheophytes
- Clade: Angiosperms
- Clade: Eudicots
- Clade: Rosids
- Order: Myrtales
- Family: Myrtaceae
- Genus: Myrcia
- Species: M. simulata

Binomial name
- Myrcia simulata (McVaugh) A.R.Lourenço & Parra-Os.

Synonyms
- Calyptranthes simulata McVaugh

Species of plant

Myrcia simulata is a species of plant in the family Myrtaceae. It is found in South America from south-eastern Colombia to northern and western Bolivia.
