= Myrcia sphaerocarpa =

Scientific classification
- Kingdom: Plantae
- Clade: Tracheophytes
- Clade: Angiosperms
- Clade: Eudicots
- Clade: Rosids
- Order: Myrtales
- Family: Myrtaceae
- Genus: Myrcia
- Species: M. sphaerocarpa

Binomial name
- Myrcia sphaerocarpa DC.

Species of flowering plant

Myrcia sphaerocarpa is native to the Amazon Basin of Latin America. The root extract, known as "Pedra Hume de Kaá" is used by the natives as a powerful healing poultice. Research has been conducted on it in Brazil as an anti-diabetic drug, calling it the "insulin plant".

Pedra hume caá is a medium-sized shrub that grows in drier regions of the Amazon and other parts of Brazil. In Brazil, the common name pedra hume caá refers to three species of myrcia plants that are used interchangeably-Myrcia salicifolia, Myrcia uniflorus, and Myrcia sphaerocarpa. It is unknown if reports on pedra hume caá can be applied to other species in the myrcia genus.

Pedra hume caá has been used by indigenous tribes in the rainforest for diabetes, diarrhea, and dysentery. The Taiwanos tribe (in northwest Amazonia) considers the leaves to be an astringent and uses them for persistent diarrhea. Pedra hume caá has had a place in Brazilian traditional medicine for many years.

It remains a very popular natural remedy for diabetes throughout South America; the traditional use is a simple leaf tea with a pleasant, slightly sweet taste. It is also used for hypertension (high blood pressure), enteritis (inflammation of the bowels), hemorrhage, and mouth ulcers.
