= Myrcia sessilis =

Conservation status
- Endangered (IUCN 3.1)

Scientific classification
- Kingdom: Plantae
- Clade: Tracheophytes
- Clade: Angiosperms
- Clade: Eudicots
- Clade: Rosids
- Order: Myrtales
- Family: Myrtaceae
- Genus: Myrcia
- Species: M. sessilis

Binomial name
- Myrcia sessilis (McVaugh) A.R.Lourenço & Parra-Os.

Synonyms
- Calyptranthes sessilis McVaugh

Species of plant

Myrcia sessilis is a species of plant in the family Myrtaceae. It is endemic to northern Peru.
