= Lysipomia caespitosa =

Conservation status
- Vulnerable (IUCN 3.1)

Scientific classification
- Kingdom: Plantae
- Clade: Tracheophytes
- Clade: Angiosperms
- Clade: Eudicots
- Clade: Asterids
- Order: Asterales
- Family: Campanulaceae
- Genus: Lysipomia
- Species: L. caespitosa

Binomial name
- Lysipomia caespitosa T.J.Ayers

Species of flowering plant

Lysipomia caespitosa is a species of plant in the family Campanulaceae. It is endemic to Ecuador. Its natural habitat is subtropical or tropical high-altitude grassland. It is threatened by habitat loss.
