= Myrcia salicifolia =

Conservation status
- Least Concern (IUCN 3.1)

Scientific classification
- Kingdom: Plantae
- Clade: Tracheophytes
- Clade: Angiosperms
- Clade: Eudicots
- Clade: Rosids
- Order: Myrtales
- Family: Myrtaceae
- Genus: Myrcia
- Species: M. salicifolia

Binomial name
- Myrcia salicifolia DC.

Synonyms
- Aulomyrcia salicifolia (DC.) O.Berg

Species of flowering plant

Myrcia salicifolia is a species of flowering plant in the family Myrtaceae. It is a shrub or tree native to northern Brazil, Colombia, and Peru. It grows up to 10 metres tall, with white flowers in January, March, August, and December and dark fruits in April and from October to January. It is known mostly from the Caquetá moist forests and Rio Negro campinarana ecoregions, where it grows in riverbank forest in lowland Amazon rainforest up to 250 metres elevation.
