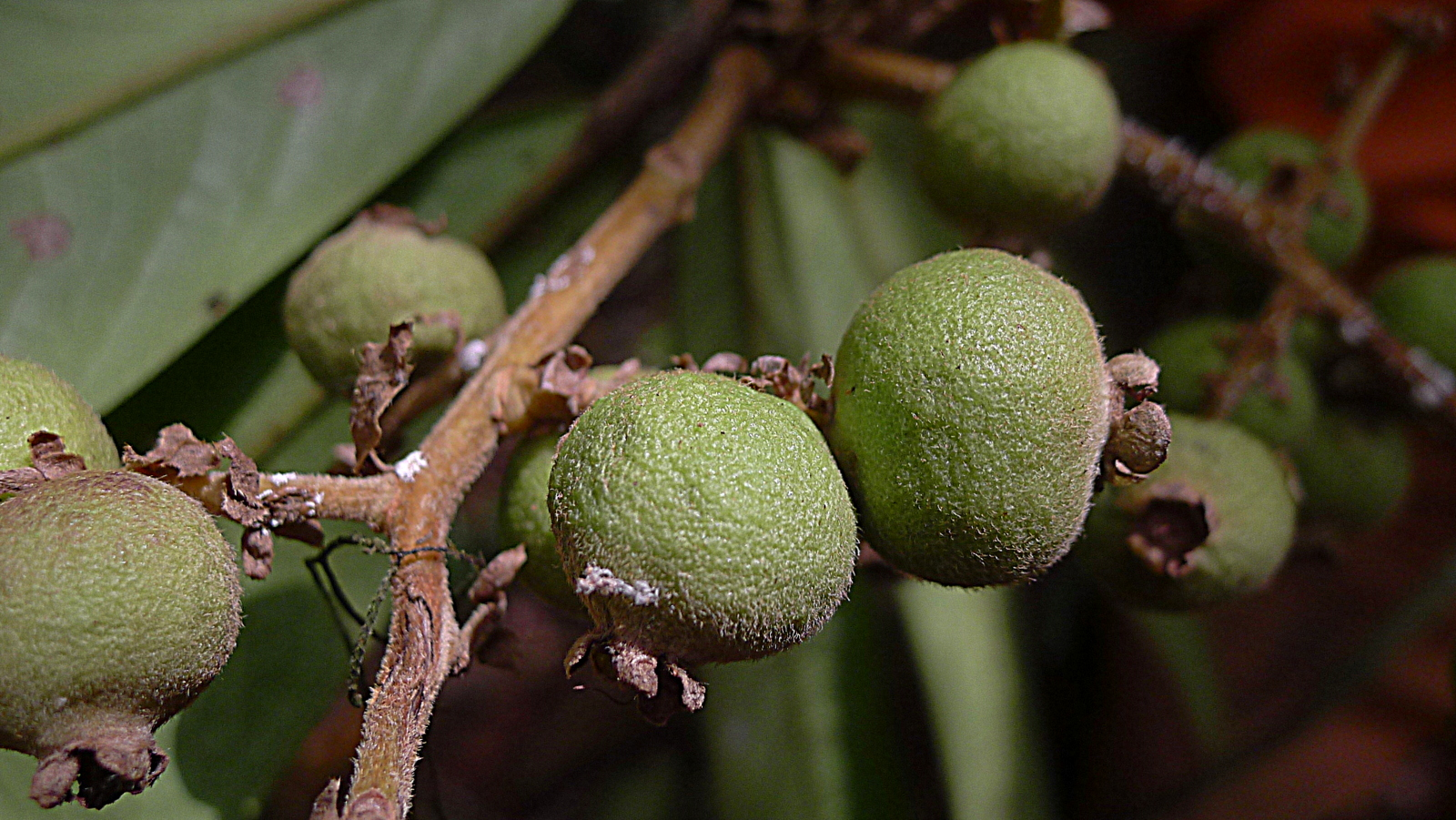

Scientific classification
- Kingdom: Plantae
- Clade: Tracheophytes
- Clade: Angiosperms
- Clade: Eudicots
- Clade: Rosids
- Order: Myrtales
- Family: Myrtaceae
- Genus: Myrcia
- Species: M. obversa

Binomial name
- Myrcia obversa (D.Legrand) E.Lucas & C.E.Wilson

Synonyms
- Marlierea obversa D.Legrand; Rubachia spathulata O.Berg

= Myrcia obversa =

Species of flowering plant

Myrcia obversa is a plant in the family Myrtaceae. It is native to Northeast and Southeast Brazil.
