= Myrcia attenuata =

Conservation status
- Least Concern (IUCN 3.1)

Scientific classification
- Kingdom: Plantae
- Clade: Tracheophytes
- Clade: Angiosperms
- Clade: Eudicots
- Clade: Rosids
- Order: Myrtales
- Family: Myrtaceae
- Genus: Myrcia
- Species: M. attenuata

Binomial name
- Myrcia attenuata M.F.Santos

Species of plant in the myrtle family

Myrcia attenuata is a species of flowering plant in the family Myrtaceae It is a tree endemic to French Guiana which was first described in 2015.

== Description ==
Myrcia attenuata is a tree that grows to between 4 and 25 metres (13 and 82 ft) tall. Leaves grow up to 14.7 cm (5.8 in) long and 4.6 cm (1.8 in) wide. Fruits grow up to 8 mm wide.

== Distribution and habitat ==
This plant has been found in three distributed locations in French Guiana, and is expected to grow more widely than its current known locations. It is native to the Guianan moist forests ecoregion, where it grows in lowland rainforest from 100 to 400 metres elevation.

== Etymology ==
The species name refers to the rare shape of the base of the fruit.
