= Myrcia crassimarginata =

Conservation status
- Least Concern (IUCN 3.1)

Scientific classification
- Kingdom: Plantae
- Clade: Tracheophytes
- Clade: Angiosperms
- Clade: Eudicots
- Clade: Rosids
- Order: Myrtales
- Family: Myrtaceae
- Genus: Myrcia
- Species: M. crassimarginata

Binomial name
- Myrcia crassimarginata McVaugh

Species of plant

Myrcia crassimarginata is a species of flowering plant in the family Myrtaceae. It is a tree native to Ecuador and northern Peru. It grows in lowland and lower montane Amazon rainforest from 200 to 1,200 metres elevation, and has mostly been collected from the Napo moist forests ecoregion.
