= Myrcia peduncularis =

Scientific classification
- Kingdom: Plantae
- Clade: Tracheophytes
- Clade: Angiosperms
- Clade: Eudicots
- Clade: Rosids
- Order: Myrtales
- Family: Myrtaceae
- Genus: Myrcia
- Species: M. peduncularis

Binomial name
- Myrcia peduncularis (Alain) E.Lucas & Acev.-Rodr.

Synonyms
- Calyptranthes dumetorum Alain; Calyptranthes peduncularis Alain

Species of flowering plant

Myrcia peduncularis is a species of flowering plant in the myrtle family, Myrtaceae. It is sometimes referred to by the common names Maricao lidflower and serpentine lidflower. It is endemic to Puerto Rico, where it grows on serpentine soils at 300 to 400 meters in altitude, to a height of between 1.5 and 2 meters. There are perhaps 200 to 300 individuals left. Besides this, "there is nearly no information in the literature about this species."
