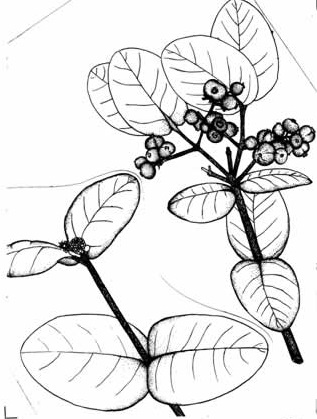

Conservation status
- Vulnerable (IUCN 2.3)

Scientific classification
- Kingdom: Plantae
- Clade: Tracheophytes
- Clade: Angiosperms
- Clade: Eudicots
- Clade: Rosids
- Order: Myrtales
- Family: Myrtaceae
- Genus: Myrcia
- Species: M. sintenisiana

Binomial name
- Myrcia sintenisiana M.F.Santos

Synonyms
- Marlierea sintenisii Kiærsk.; Plinia sintenisii (Kiaersk.) Britton

= Myrcia sintenisiana =

Species of plant

Myrcia sintenisiana (synonym Marlierea sintenisii) is a species of flowering plant in the family Myrtaceae. It is endemic to Puerto Rico, where it is limited to the Luquillo Mountains. It occurs in El Yunque National Forest in dwarf forest habitat on wet mountain ridges. Its common name is beruquillo.

This species can take the form of a shrub 3 or 4 meters tall or a tree up to 9 meters tall. New twigs are coated in reddish brown hairs, and older branches are bare and gray. The leaves are up to 7.5 centimeters long by 5 wide. New leaves are shiny and coppery in color. Hairy flowers grow in clusters.
