= Myrcia polyneura =

Conservation status
- Critically Endangered (IUCN 3.1)

Scientific classification
- Kingdom: Plantae
- Clade: Tracheophytes
- Clade: Angiosperms
- Clade: Eudicots
- Clade: Rosids
- Order: Myrtales
- Family: Myrtaceae
- Genus: Myrcia
- Species: M. polyneura

Binomial name
- Myrcia polyneura (Urb.) Borhidi

Synonyms
- Calyptranthes polyneura Urb.

Species of flowering plant

Myrcia polyneura is a species of plant in the family Myrtaceae. It is a shrub or tree endemic to the Sierra de Nipe in eastern Cuba.
