= Myrcia manacalensis =

Conservation status
- Endangered (IUCN 3.1)

Scientific classification
- Kingdom: Plantae
- Clade: Tracheophytes
- Clade: Angiosperms
- Clade: Eudicots
- Clade: Rosids
- Order: Myrtales
- Family: Myrtaceae
- Genus: Myrcia
- Species: M. manacalensis

Binomial name
- Myrcia manacalensis Urb.

Synonyms
- Anamomis reticulata Britton & P.Wilson; Mozartia manacalensis (Urb.) Urb.

Species of flowering plant

Myrcia manacalensis ( synonym Mozartia manacalensis) is a species of flowering plant in the family Myrtaceae. It is a tree endemic to the Sierra Maestra of southeastern Cuba.

The species was described by Ignatz Urban in 1923.
