= Myrcia adunca =

Conservation status
- Critically Endangered (IUCN 3.1)

Scientific classification
- Kingdom: Plantae
- Clade: Tracheophytes
- Clade: Angiosperms
- Clade: Eudicots
- Clade: Rosids
- Order: Myrtales
- Family: Myrtaceae
- Genus: Myrcia
- Species: M. adunca

Binomial name
- Myrcia adunca Z.Acosta & K.Samra

Synonyms
- Calyptranthes rostrata Griseb., nom. illeg. homonym. post.

Species of flowering plant

Myrcia adunca is a species of flowering plant in the family Myrtaceae. It is a shrub endemic to eastern Cuba.
