= Myrcia umbelliformis =

Conservation status
- Vulnerable (IUCN 2.3)

Scientific classification
- Kingdom: Plantae
- Clade: Tracheophytes
- Clade: Angiosperms
- Clade: Eudicots
- Clade: Rosids
- Order: Myrtales
- Family: Myrtaceae
- Genus: Myrcia
- Species: M. umbelliformis

Binomial name
- Myrcia umbelliformis (Krug & Urb.) K.Campbell & K.Samra

Synonyms
- Calyptranthes impressa Urb.; Calyptranthes umbelliformis Krug. & Urb.

Species of flowering plant

Myrcia umbelliformis is a species of flowering plant in the family Myrtaceae. It is a shrub or tree endemic to Jamaica. It has a disjunct distribution in Saint James Parish in the west and Portland Parish in the east, where it grows in tropical moist forest on limestone hills.
