= Myrcia acutissima =

Conservation status
- Critically Endangered (IUCN 2.3)

Scientific classification
- Kingdom: Plantae
- Clade: Tracheophytes
- Clade: Angiosperms
- Clade: Eudicots
- Clade: Rosids
- Order: Myrtales
- Family: Myrtaceae
- Genus: Myrcia
- Species: M. acutissima

Binomial name
- Myrcia acutissima (Urb.) K.Campbell & K.Samra

Synonyms
- Calyptranthes acutissima Urb.

Species of flowering plant

Myrcia acutissima is a species of plant in the family Myrtaceae. It is endemic to Jamaica.
