= Myrcia skeldingii =

Conservation status
- Extinct (1972) (IUCN 2.3)

Scientific classification
- Kingdom: Plantae
- Clade: Tracheophytes
- Clade: Angiosperms
- Clade: Eudicots
- Clade: Rosids
- Order: Myrtales
- Family: Myrtaceae
- Genus: Myrcia
- Species: †M. skeldingii

Binomial name
- †Myrcia skeldingii Proctor

Extinct species of flowering plant

Myrcia skeldingii is an extinct species of plant in the family Myrtaceae that was endemic to a single location along the Mason River between Clarendon and Saint Ann Parishes, Jamaica. It became extinct due to habitat loss.
