= Myrcia neocapitata =

Conservation status
- Vulnerable (IUCN 2.3)

Scientific classification
- Kingdom: Plantae
- Clade: Tracheophytes
- Clade: Angiosperms
- Clade: Eudicots
- Clade: Rosids
- Order: Myrtales
- Family: Myrtaceae
- Genus: Myrcia
- Species: M. neocapitata

Binomial name
- Myrcia neocapitata K.Campbell & E.Lucas

Synonyms
- Calyptranthes capitata Proctor

Species of flowering plant

Myrcia neocapitata is a species of flowering plant in the family Myrtaceae. It is a shrub endemic to Jamaica.
