= Myrcia chionantha =

Conservation status
- Endangered (IUCN 2.3)

Scientific classification
- Kingdom: Plantae
- Clade: Tracheophytes
- Clade: Angiosperms
- Clade: Eudicots
- Clade: Rosids
- Order: Myrtales
- Family: Myrtaceae
- Genus: Myrcia
- Species: M. chionantha

Binomial name
- Myrcia chionantha Flickinger

Synonyms
- Mitranthes nivea Proctor

Species of flowering plant

Myrcia chionantha (synonym Mitranthes nivea) is a species of plant in the family Myrtaceae. It is endemic to Jamaica.
