= Myrcia fosteri =

Conservation status
- Least Concern (IUCN 3.1)

Scientific classification
- Kingdom: Plantae
- Clade: Tracheophytes
- Clade: Angiosperms
- Clade: Eudicots
- Clade: Rosids
- Order: Myrtales
- Family: Myrtaceae
- Genus: Myrcia
- Species: M. fosteri

Binomial name
- Myrcia fosteri Croat

Species of flowering plant

Myrcia fosteri is a species of plant in the family Myrtaceae. It is endemic to Panama. It is threatened by habitat loss.
