= Myrcia hanoverensis =

Conservation status
- Endangered (IUCN 2.3)

Scientific classification
- Kingdom: Plantae
- Clade: Tracheophytes
- Clade: Angiosperms
- Clade: Eudicots
- Clade: Rosids
- Order: Myrtales
- Family: Myrtaceae
- Genus: Myrcia
- Species: M. hanoverensis

Binomial name
- Myrcia hanoverensis K.Campbell & Commock

Synonyms
- Calyptranthes discolor Urb.

Species of flowering plant

Myrcia hanoverensis is a species of flowering plant in the family Myrtaceae. It is endemic to north-western Jamaica. It is threatened by habitat loss.
