= Myrcia almasensis =

Conservation status
- Endangered (IUCN 3.1)

Scientific classification
- Kingdom: Plantae
- Clade: Tracheophytes
- Clade: Angiosperms
- Clade: Eudicots
- Clade: Rosids
- Order: Myrtales
- Family: Myrtaceae
- Genus: Myrcia
- Species: M. almasensis

Binomial name
- Myrcia almasensis NicLugh.

Species of flowering plant

Myrcia almasensis is a species of flowering plant in the family Myrtaceae. It is a shrub or tree endemic to the state of Bahia in northeastern Brazil.
