= Myrcia asperorum =

Conservation status
- Critically Endangered (IUCN 2.3)

Scientific classification
- Kingdom: Plantae
- Clade: Tracheophytes
- Clade: Angiosperms
- Clade: Eudicots
- Clade: Rosids
- Order: Myrtales
- Family: Myrtaceae
- Genus: Myrcia
- Species: M. asperorum

Binomial name
- Myrcia asperorum Flickinger

Synonyms
- Mitranthes macrophylla Proctor

Species of plant

Myrcia asperorum (synonym Mitranthes macrophylla) is a species of plant in the family Myrtaceae. It is a shrub or tree endemic to Jamaica. It is threatened by habitat loss.
