= Myrcia pubipetala =

Conservation status
- Vulnerable (IUCN 3.1)

Scientific classification
- Kingdom: Plantae
- Clade: Tracheophytes
- Clade: Angiosperms
- Clade: Eudicots
- Clade: Rosids
- Order: Myrtales
- Family: Myrtaceae
- Genus: Myrcia
- Species: M. pubipetala

Binomial name
- Myrcia pubipetala Miq.

Synonyms
- Aulomyrcia grandiflora O.Berg; Myrcia grandiflora (O.Berg) Nied.; Myrcia pubipetala var. magnifolia D.Legrand

Species of flowering plant

Myrcia pubipetala is a species of flowering plant in the family Myrtaceae. It is a tree endemic to eastern and southern Brazil. It can grow up to 15 metres tall. It grows in dense lowland and lower montane tropical forest, alluvial forest, and restinga up to 1,100 metres elevation. It is known mostly from the Serra do Mar coastal forests, Southern Atlantic Brazilian mangroves, and Araucaria moist forests ecoregions.
