= Myrcia maestrensis =

Conservation status
- Endangered (IUCN 3.1)

Scientific classification
- Kingdom: Plantae
- Clade: Tracheophytes
- Clade: Angiosperms
- Clade: Eudicots
- Clade: Rosids
- Order: Myrtales
- Family: Myrtaceae
- Genus: Myrcia
- Species: M. maestrensis

Binomial name
- Myrcia maestrensis (Urb.) Alain

Synonyms
- Mozartia maestrensis Urb.

Species of flowering plant

Myrcia maestrensis is a species of plant in the family Myrtaceae. It is endemic to Cuba.
