= Myrcia calcicola =

Conservation status
- Vulnerable (IUCN 2.3)

Scientific classification
- Kingdom: Plantae
- Clade: Tracheophytes
- Clade: Angiosperms
- Clade: Eudicots
- Clade: Rosids
- Order: Myrtales
- Family: Myrtaceae
- Genus: Myrcia
- Species: M. calcicola

Binomial name
- Myrcia calcicola Proctor

Species of flowering plant

Myrcia calcicola is a species of flowering plant in the family Myrtaceae. It is a shrub or tree endemic to Jamaica and is threatened by habitat loss.
