= Myrcia arenicola =

Conservation status
- Critically Endangered (IUCN 2.3)

Scientific classification
- Kingdom: Plantae
- Clade: Tracheophytes
- Clade: Angiosperms
- Clade: Eudicots
- Clade: Rosids
- Order: Myrtales
- Family: Myrtaceae
- Genus: Myrcia
- Species: M. arenicola

Binomial name
- Myrcia arenicola (Urb.) Z.Acosta & K.Samra

Synonyms
- Calyptranthes arenicola Urb.

Species of flowering plant

Myrcia arenicola is a species of plant in the family Myrtaceae. It is endemic to western Cuba.
