= Myrcia portoricensis =

Conservation status
- Critically Endangered (IUCN 3.1)

Scientific classification
- Kingdom: Plantae
- Clade: Tracheophytes
- Clade: Angiosperms
- Clade: Eudicots
- Clade: Rosids
- Order: Myrtales
- Family: Myrtaceae
- Genus: Myrcia
- Species: M. portoricensis

Binomial name
- Myrcia portoricensis (Britt.) Cedeño-Mald. & Breckon ex F.S.Axelrod

Synonyms
- Calyptranthes portoricensis Britt.; Myrcia maricaensis Alain

Species of flowering plant

Myrcia portoricensis is a species of plant in the family Myrtaceae. It is a shrub or tree endemic to Puerto Rico.
