= Myrcia neoelegans =

Scientific classification
- Kingdom: Plantae
- Clade: Tracheophytes
- Clade: Angiosperms
- Clade: Eudicots
- Clade: Rosids
- Order: Myrtales
- Family: Myrtaceae
- Genus: Myrcia
- Species: M. neoelegans

Binomial name
- Myrcia neoelegans K.Campbell & K.Samra

Synonyms
- Calyptranthes elegans Krug

Species of flowering plant

Myrcia neoelegans, the bashy guava, is a species of flowering plants in the family Myrtaceae. It is endemic to the Lesser Antilles.
