= Myrcia magnifolia =

Conservation status
- Endangered (IUCN 2.3)

Scientific classification
- Kingdom: Plantae
- Clade: Tracheophytes
- Clade: Angiosperms
- Clade: Eudicots
- Clade: Rosids
- Order: Myrtales
- Family: Myrtaceae
- Genus: Myrcia
- Species: M. magnifolia

Binomial name
- Myrcia magnifolia (O.Berg) Kiaersk.

Synonyms
- Gomidesia magnifolia O.Berg

Species of flowering plant

Myrcia magnifolia is a species of flowering plant in the family Myrtaceae. It is a shrub or tree endemic to southeast Brazil. The IUCN Red List assesses the species as endangered.
