= Myrcia clarendonensis =

Conservation status
- Vulnerable (IUCN 2.3)

Scientific classification
- Kingdom: Plantae
- Clade: Tracheophytes
- Clade: Angiosperms
- Clade: Eudicots
- Clade: Rosids
- Order: Myrtales
- Family: Myrtaceae
- Genus: Myrcia
- Species: M. clarendonensis

Binomial name
- Myrcia clarendonensis (Proctor) Flickinger

Synonyms
- Calyptranthes clarendonensis Proctor; Mitranthes clarendonensis (Proctor) Proctor

Species of flowering plant

Myrcia clarendonensis (synonym Mitranthes clarendonensis) is a species of plant in the family Myrtaceae. It is endemic to Jamaica.
