= Myrcia nodosa =

Conservation status
- Vulnerable (IUCN 2.3)

Scientific classification
- Kingdom: Plantae
- Clade: Tracheophytes
- Clade: Angiosperms
- Clade: Eudicots
- Clade: Rosids
- Order: Myrtales
- Family: Myrtaceae
- Genus: Myrcia
- Species: M. nodosa

Binomial name
- Myrcia nodosa (Urb.) K.Campbell & K.Samra

Synonyms
- Calyptranthes nodosa Urb.

Species of flowering plant

Myrcia nodosa is a species of flowering plant in the family Myrtaceae. It is a shrub or tree endemic to Jamaica.
