= Myrcia flavoviridis =

Conservation status
- Critically Endangered (IUCN 3.1)

Scientific classification
- Kingdom: Plantae
- Clade: Tracheophytes
- Clade: Angiosperms
- Clade: Eudicots
- Clade: Rosids
- Order: Myrtales
- Family: Myrtaceae
- Genus: Myrcia
- Species: M. flavoviridis

Binomial name
- Myrcia flavoviridis (Urb.) Z.Acosta & K.Samra

Synonyms
- Calyptranthes flavoviridis Urb.

Species of flowering plant

Myrcia flavoviridis is a species of flowering plant in the family Myrtaceae. It is a shrub or tree endemic to western Cuba and is threatened by habitat loss.
