= Myrcia wilsonii =

Conservation status
- Vulnerable (IUCN 2.3)

Scientific classification
- Kingdom: Plantae
- Clade: Tracheophytes
- Clade: Angiosperms
- Clade: Eudicots
- Clade: Rosids
- Order: Myrtales
- Family: Myrtaceae
- Genus: Myrcia
- Species: M. wilsonii

Binomial name
- Myrcia wilsonii (Griseb.) K.Campbell & K.Samra

Synonyms
- Calyptranthes wilsonii Griseb.

Species of flowering plant

Myrcia wilsonii is a species of flowering plant in the family Myrtaceae. It is a shrub endemic to eastern Jamaica. It is threatened by habitat loss.
