= Myrcia pozasiana =

Conservation status
- Critically Endangered (IUCN 2.3)

Scientific classification
- Kingdom: Plantae
- Clade: Tracheophytes
- Clade: Angiosperms
- Clade: Eudicots
- Clade: Rosids
- Order: Myrtales
- Family: Myrtaceae
- Genus: Myrcia
- Species: M. pozasiana

Binomial name
- Myrcia pozasiana (Urb.) Z.Acosta & K.Samra

Synonyms
- Calyptranthes pozasiana Urb.

Species of flowering plant

Myrcia pozasiana is a species of plant in the family Myrtaceae. It is a shrub or tree endemic to western Cuba.
