= Bordeaux Mountain =

Highest peak on the island of Saint John, U.S. Virgin Islands

- Location within the U.S. Virgin Islands

Highest point
- Elevation: 1,286 ft (392 m)
- Prominence: 1,286 ft (392 m)
- Coordinates: 18°20′03″N 64°43′43″W

Geography
- Location: Virgin Islands National Park, Saint John, U.S. Virgin Islands

Climbing
- Easiest route: Hike

Bordeaux Mountain (1,286 feet (392 m) is located on the island of Saint John, U.S. Virgin Islands within Virgin Islands National Park. Bordeaux Mountain is the highest summit on the island of Saint John. It is one of only three locations where the endangered Thomas' lidflower (Myrcia neothomasiana) is found.
