= Myrcia densiflora =

Conservation status
- Least Concern (IUCN 3.1)

Scientific classification
- Kingdom: Plantae
- Clade: Tracheophytes
- Clade: Angiosperms
- Clade: Eudicots
- Clade: Rosids
- Order: Myrtales
- Family: Myrtaceae
- Genus: Myrcia
- Species: M. densiflora

Binomial name
- Myrcia densiflora (Poepp. ex O. Berg) A.R.Lourenço & E.Lucas

Synonyms
- Calyptranthes densiflora Poepp. ex O. Berg; Chytraculia densiflora (Poepp. ex O.Berg) Kuntze

Species of plant

Myrcia densiflora is a species of tree in the family Myrtaceae. It is found in South America from Bolivia, Brazil (Acre), Ecuador and Peru. It has simple, broad leaves.
