= Myrcia eugenioides =

Conservation status
- Vulnerable (IUCN 3.1)

Scientific classification
- Kingdom: Plantae
- Clade: Tracheophytes
- Clade: Angiosperms
- Clade: Eudicots
- Clade: Rosids
- Order: Myrtales
- Family: Myrtaceae
- Genus: Myrcia
- Species: M. eugenioides

Binomial name
- Myrcia eugenioides Cambess.

Synonyms
- Aulomyrcia lineata O.Berg; Calyptromyrcia eugenioides (Cambess.) O.Berg; Calyptromyrcia eugenioides var. glabra O.Berg; Marlierea eugenioides (Cambess.) D.Legrand; Myrcia lineata (O.Berg) Nied.

Species of flowering plant

Myrcia eugenioides is a species of flowering plant in the family Myrtaceae. It is a tree native to the Atlantic Forest ecoregion of eastern Brazil, ranging from the states of Alagoas in the north to Rio de Janeiro in the south.
