= Myrcia neokiaerskovii =

Conservation status
- Critically Endangered (IUCN 3.1)

Scientific classification
- Kingdom: Plantae
- Clade: Tracheophytes
- Clade: Angiosperms
- Clade: Eudicots
- Clade: Rosids
- Order: Myrtales
- Family: Myrtaceae
- Genus: Myrcia
- Species: M. neokiaerskovii

Binomial name
- Myrcia neokiaerskovii E.Lucas & K.Samra

Synonyms
- Calyptranthes kiaerskovii Krug & Urb.; Calyptranthes obovat Krug & Urb.

Species of flowering plant

Myrcia neokiaerskovii, the Kiaerskov's lidflower or obovate lidflower, is a species of plant in the family Myrtaceae. It is found in Puerto Rico and the British Virgin Islands. Its natural habitat is subtropical or tropical dry forests. It is threatened by habitat loss.

The plant is glabrous, and its branches are dichotomously forked. Leaves are obovate, measuring up to 2.5 cm long and 1-2 cm wide.
