= Myrcia proctorii =

Conservation status
- Critically Endangered (IUCN 3.1)

Scientific classification
- Kingdom: Plantae
- Clade: Tracheophytes
- Clade: Angiosperms
- Clade: Eudicots
- Clade: Rosids
- Order: Myrtales
- Family: Myrtaceae
- Genus: Myrcia
- Species: M. proctorii

Binomial name
- Myrcia proctorii (Acev.-Rodr.) Acev.-Rodr. & K.Campbell

Synonyms
- Calyptranthes proctorii Acev.-Rodr.; Calyptranthes uniflora Proctor

Species of flowering plant

Myrcia proctorii is a species of flowering plant in the family Myrtaceae. It is a shrub or tree endemic to Jamaica.
