= Myrcia neothomasiana =

Conservation status
- Endangered (IUCN 3.1)

Scientific classification
- Kingdom: Plantae
- Clade: Tracheophytes
- Clade: Angiosperms
- Clade: Eudicots
- Clade: Rosids
- Order: Myrtales
- Family: Myrtaceae
- Genus: Myrcia
- Species: M. neothomasiana

Binomial name
- Myrcia neothomasiana A.R.Lourenço & E.Lucas

Synonyms
- Calyptranthes thomasiana O.Berg; Chytraculia thomasiana (O.Berg) Kuntze

Species of flowering plant

Myrcia neothomasiana, commonly known as Thomas' lidflower, is a rare species of plant in the family Myrtaceae. It is found on three Caribbean islands. There are fewer than 250 individuals total divided amongst the islands of Vieques in Puerto Rico, St. John in the United States Virgin Islands, and Virgin Gorda in the British Virgin Islands. It has been extirpated from the wild on Saint Thomas, U.S. Virgin Islands, where it was first described in 1855, and now only grows there in cultivation.

The plant is a member of the islands' montane flora. It occurs on one mountain peak on each of the three islands: Monte Pirata on Vieques, Bordeaux Mountain on St. John, and Gorda Peak on Virgin Gorda. Its natural habitat is dry to moist forests.

This is an evergreen shrub or small tree which can reach 10 meters in height. The oppositely arranged leaves have oval blades 2 to 4 centimeters long which are shiny green and glandular. The flowers have four spoon-shaped petals. The plant is perhaps naturally rare, but habitat loss has contributed to its decline. The Vieques population is located on land formerly owned by the United States Navy and now part of Vieques National Wildlife Refuge. It occurs at the highest elevation on the island, 300 meters, amongst orchids and bromeliads. There are only 10 to 12 individuals known from this area, and although the threat of damage from Navy activity is gone today, the plant is still vulnerable to extirpation from any one severe event, such as a hurricane. Hurricane Hugo caused forest damage in 1989, for example.

On St. John it also occupies the highest mountain peak at an elevation around 380 meters. There are about 100 individuals in this area, which is within the bounds of Virgin Islands National Park. They do face threats from activity on nearby roads, and from feral pigs, donkeys, and goats. Deforestation was cited as a main reason for the plant's being added to the endangered species list of the United States.
