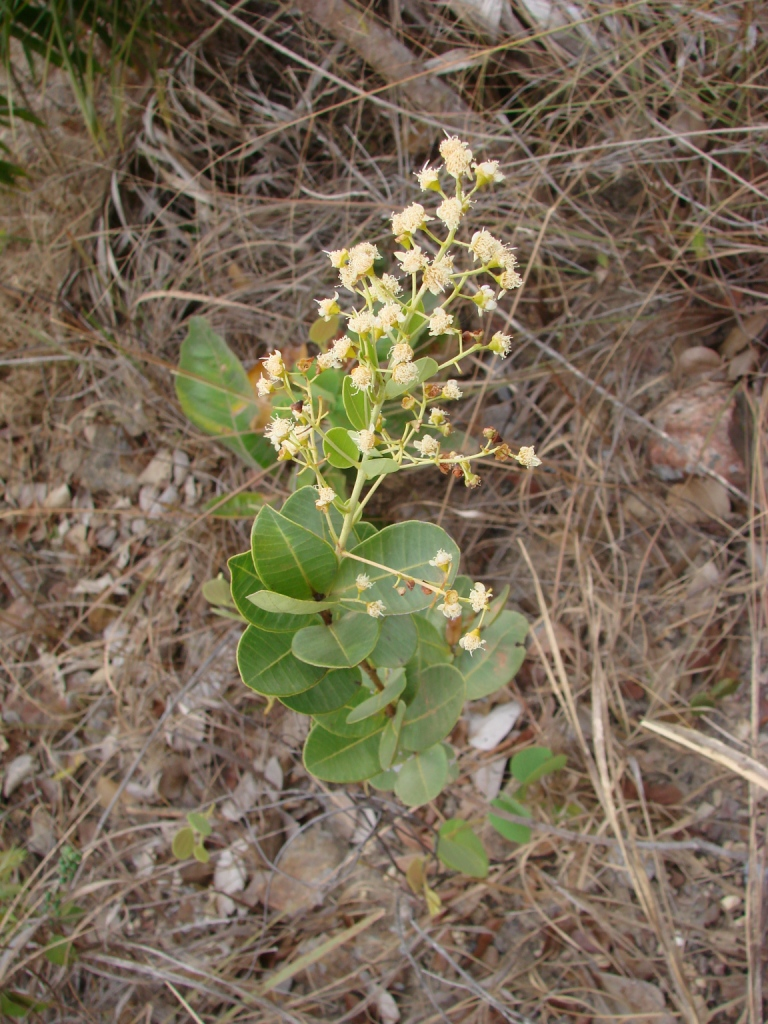
- Myrcia guianensis - Parque Ecológico Dom Bosco, Brasília, Distrito Federal, Brazil

Scientific classification
- Kingdom: Plantae
- Clade: Tracheophytes
- Clade: Angiosperms
- Clade: Eudicots
- Clade: Rosids
- Order: Myrtales
- Family: Myrtaceae
- Genus: Myrcia
- Species: M. guianensis

Binomial name
- Myrcia guianensis (Aubl.) DC.

Synonyms
- List: Aguava guianensis (Aubl.) Raf.; Aulomyrcia alternifolia (Miq.) O.Berg; Aulomyrcia androsaemoides O.Berg; Aulomyrcia angustifolia O.Berg; Aulomyrcia biformis O.Berg; Aulomyrcia bimarginata O.Berg; Aulomyrcia botrys O.Berg; Aulomyrcia bracteata O.Berg; Aulomyrcia buxifolia var. elliptica O.Berg; Aulomyrcia buxifolia var. ovalis O.Berg; Aulomyrcia buxizans O.Berg; Aulomyrcia cassinioides (DC.) O.Berg; Aulomyrcia cassinioides var. glabrata O.Berg; Aulomyrcia cassinioides var. velutina O.Berg; Aulomyrcia clausseniana O.Berg; Aulomyrcia conduplicata O.Berg; Aulomyrcia crassicaulis (Cambess.) O.Berg; Aulomyrcia cuneata O.Berg; Aulomyrcia daphnoides (DC.) O.Berg; Aulomyrcia decrescens O.Berg; Aulomyrcia desertorum O.Berg; Aulomyrcia dichroma O.Berg; Aulomyrcia elaeodendra (DC.) O.Berg; Aulomyrcia emarginata O.Berg; Aulomyrcia exsucca (DC.) O.Berg; Aulomyrcia fragilis O.Berg; Aulomyrcia gardneriana O.Berg; Aulomyrcia gardneriana var. caerulescens O.Berg; Aulomyrcia gardneriana var. virescens O.Berg; Aulomyrcia glandulosa O.Berg; Aulomyrcia glandulosa var. elliptica O.Berg; Aulomyrcia glandulosa var. longifolia O.Berg; Aulomyrcia glandulosa var. obovata O.Berg; Aulomyrcia hepatica O.Berg; Aulomyrcia jequitinhonhensis var. glauca O.Berg; Aulomyrcia lauriflora (DC.) O.Berg; Aulomyrcia leucadendron (DC.) O.Berg; Aulomyrcia lingua O.Berg; Aulomyrcia lingua var. glabrata O.Berg; Aulomyrcia lingua var. rufa O.Berg; Aulomyrcia mansoni O.Berg; Aulomyrcia maritima O.Berg; Aulomyrcia nigropunctata O.Berg; Aulomyrcia obscura O.Berg; Aulomyrcia obscura var. longipes O.Berg; Aulomyrcia obtecta O.Berg; Aulomyrcia obtusa (Schauer) O.Berg; Aulomyrcia obtusa var. grandifolia O.Berg; Aulomyrcia obtusa var. longipes O.Berg; Aulomyrcia obtusa var. panicularis O.Berg; Aulomyrcia obtusa var. pauciflora O.Berg; Aulomyrcia obtusa var. surinamensis (Miq.) Amshoff; Aulomyrcia obtusa var. tenuifolia O.Berg; Aulomyrcia pallens (DC.) O.Berg; Aulomyrcia pallens var. ovalis O.Berg; Aulomyrcia pallens var. ovata O.Berg; Aulomyrcia pallens var. subcordata O.Berg; Aulomyrcia plumbea O.Berg; Aulomyrcia poeppigiana O.Berg; Aulomyrcia pruinosa O.Berg; Aulomyrcia pusilla O.Berg; Aulomyrcia regeliana O.Berg; Aulomyrcia regeliana var. oppositifolia O.Berg; Aulomyrcia regeliana var. sparsifolia O.Berg; Aulomyrcia roraimae (Oliv.) Steyerm.; Aulomyrcia roraimensis O.Berg; Aulomyrcia rotundifolia O.Berg; Aulomyrcia schomburgkiana O.Berg; Aulomyrcia schrankiana (DC.) O.Berg; Aulomyrcia scrobiculata O.Berg; Aulomyrcia suaveolens (Cambess.) O.Berg; Aulomyrcia suffruticosa O.Berg; Aulomyrcia surinamensis (Miq.) O.Berg; Aulomyrcia vacciniifolia O.Berg; Aulomyrcia velhensis O.Berg; Calyptromyrcia elegans (DC.) O.Berg; Calyptromyrcia spixiana (DC.) O.Berg; Eugenia guianensis Aubl.; Myrcia adpressepilosa Kiaersk.; Myrcia alternifolia Miq.; Myrcia androsaemoides (O.Berg) Krug & Urb.; Myrcia androsaemoides var. parvifolia Krug & Urb.; Myrcia angustifolia (O.Berg) Nied.; Myrcia arimensis Britton; Myrcia botrys (O.Berg) N.Silveira; Myrcia camapuana Mattos; Myrcia cassinioides DC.; Myrcia collina S.Moore; Myrcia crassicaulis Cambess.; Myrcia cuneata (O.Berg) Nied.; Myrcia cymosopaniculata Kiaersk.; Myrcia daphnoides DC.; Myrcia daphnoides var. nervosa Kiaersk.; Myrcia decrescens (O.Berg) Mattos; Myrcia desertorum (O.Berg) N.Silveira; Myrcia diaphanosticta Kiaersk.; Myrcia didrichseniana Kiaersk.; Myrcia elaeodendra DC.; Myrcia elegans DC.; Myrcia emarginata (O.Berg) Nied.; Myrcia exsucca DC.; Myrcia fastigiata Kiaersk.; Myrcia fastigiata var. coriacea Kiaersk.; Myrcia glandulosa (O.Berg) Kiaersk.; Myrcia glandulosa var. obovata (O.Berg) N.Silveira; Myrcia guianensis var. cuneata (O.Berg) McVaugh; Myrcia hepatica (O.Berg) Kiaersk.; Myrcia hiemalis Cambess.; Myrcia incisa D.Legrand; Myrcia lauriflora DC.; Myrcia lehmannii Hieron.; Myrcia leucadendron DC.; Myrcia lingua (O.Berg) Mattos; Myrcia lingua var. rufa (O.Berg) Mattos; Myrcia mansoni (O.Berg) N.Silveira; Myrcia microcarpa Cambess.; Myrcia myoporina DC.; Myrcia nigropunctata (O.Berg) N.Silveira; Myrcia obscura (O.Berg) N.Silveira; Myrcia obscura var. longipes (O.Berg) N.Silveira; Myrcia obtecta (O.Berg) Kiaersk.; Myrcia obtusa Schauer; Myrcia pallens DC.; Myrcia pallens var. ovalis (O.Berg) Kiaersk.; Myrcia pallens var. subcordata (O.Berg) Kiaersk.; Myrcia paracatuensis Kiaersk.; Myrcia plumbea (O.Berg) Mattos; Myrcia poeppigiana (O.Berg) Mattos; Myrcia pusilla (O.Berg) Mattos; Myrcia queimadensis Mattos; Myrcia renatoana Mattos; Myrcia rhabdoides Kiaersk.; Myrcia roraimae Oliv.; Myrcia roraimensis (O.Berg) D.Legrand; Myrcia rotundifolia (O.Berg) Kiaersk.; Myrcia schrankiana DC.; Myrcia scrobiculata (O.Berg) O.Berg; Myrcia spixiana DC.; Myrcia stemmeriana D.Legrand; Myrcia suaveolens Cambess.; Myrcia surinamensis Miq.; Myrcia taubatensis var. ovalis (O.Berg) Kiaersk.; Myrcia terebinthacea Poepp. ex O.Berg; Myrcia vacciniifolia (O.Berg) Nied.; Myrcia velhensis (O.Berg) N.Silveira; Myrcia yungasensis Rusby; Myrcianthes elegans (DC.) Mattos; Myrcianthes spixiana (DC.) Mattos; Myrcianthes terminalis Mattos & D.Legrand; Myrtus elegans Mart. ex DC.; Myrtus guianensis (Aubl.) Ham.; Myrtus pyrifolia J.St.-Hil.

= Myrcia guianensis =

Species of flowering plant

Myrcia guianensis (pedra-ume-caá) is a species of plant in the genus Myrcia of the family Myrtaceae native to South America.

This species shows allelopathic effects on germination and radicle and hypocotyl growth of weeds. Isolated compounds related to this inhibition are gallic and protocatechuic acids.

This species is found in association with endophytic fungi.
