= Henri Alain Liogier =

- Born: January 31, 1916
- Died: November 9, 2009 (aged 93); Fort Worth, Texas, US
- Education: University of Havana
- Awards: 1950 Guggenheim Fellow
- Scientific career
- Fields: Botany
- Author abbrev. (botany): Alain

Henri Alain Liogier, also known as Brother Alain (January 31, 1916 – November 9, 2009) was a French botanist, educator, based out of Texas, United States. Liogier is responsible for over 100 scientific journal articles and over 30 books devoted to the study of botany. He published the quintessential work on the flora of Cuba, Hispaniola and Puerto Rico, and these works are the foundation of botanical science for the Caribbean. During his life's work, he discovered over 300 species of plants all of which can be found at the New York Botanical Garden where he also served as a research associate. He was a founding member of the Academy of Science and first scientific director of the National Botanical Garden in the Dominican Republic. Dr. Liogier was recipient of the John Simon Guggenheim Fellowship for Studies in Plant Science. He was also the director of the Botanic Garden at the University of Puerto Rico.

== Education and training ==
Liogier was educated at Havana University in Cuba, completing his bachelor's degree in 1940 and his doctoral degree in 1945. He became a Professor and taught Biology and Botany at various universities in the United States and the Caribbean. Liogier was associated with the New York Botanical Garden, Harvard University and the Smithsonian Institution in Washington, D.C. In 1995, he retired from the faculty at the University of Puerto Rico. Liogier and his wife, Perpha, retired to Fort Worth, Texas, where he became a research associate of the Botanic Research Institute of Texas and the Fort Worth Botanic Garden. He was also an active member of St. Ritas Catholic Church in East Fort Worth.

== Awards ==
- 1950 Guggenheim Fellow
