= Marcos Sobral =

Brazilian botanist

- Born: 1960 (age 65–66); Brazil
- Scientific career
- Fields: Botany
- Workplaces: Federal University of São João del-Rei
- Author abbrev. (botany): Sobral

Marcos Eduardo Guerra Sobral (born 1960) is a Brazilian botanist. Since 2009 he has been an adjunct professor of Botany at the Federal University of São João del-Rei. As of the end of 2020, Sobral has authored 79 publications and published 237 taxon names, particularly within the Eugenia, Myrcia, and Plinia genera of the family Myrtaceae.

== Academic background ==
Marcos received his undergraduate degree in Biological Sciences in 2003 from Federal University of Rio Grande do Sul. He received his PhD in Botany from the Universidade Federal de Minas Gerais in 2007. His thesis was titled "Evolution of taxonomic knowledge in Brazil (1990-2006)".
