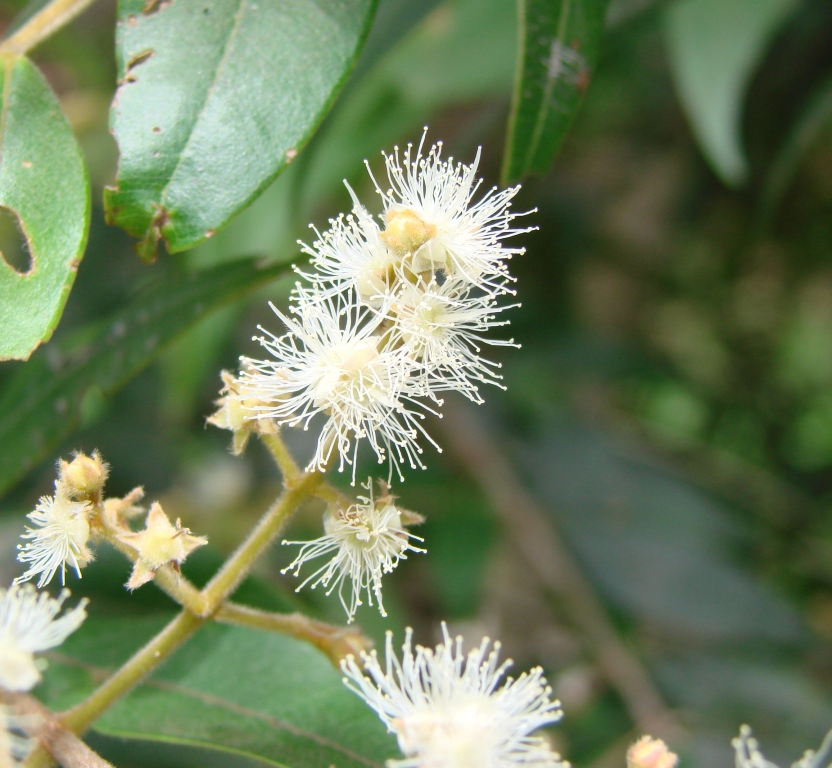
- Myrcia rostrata

Scientific classification
- Kingdom: Plantae
- Clade: Embryophytes
- Clade: Tracheophytes
- Clade: Spermatophytes
- Clade: Angiosperms
- Clade: Eudicots
- Clade: Rosids
- Order: Myrtales
- Family: Myrtaceae
- Subfamily: Myrtoideae
- Tribe: Myrteae
- Genus: Myrcia; DC.

Type species
- Myrcia bracteolaris (Poir.) DC.

Synonyms
- Aguava Raf.; Atomostigma Kuntze; Aulomyrcia O.Berg; Calycampe O.Berg; Calyptranthes Sw.; Calyptromyrcia O.Berg; Cerqueiria O.Berg; Chytraculia P.Browne; Chytralia Adans.; Cumetea Raf.; Eugeniopsis O.Berg; Gomidesia O.Berg; Krugia Urb.; Marlierea Cambess.; Mozartia Urb.; Suzygium P.Browne; Wilbrandia C.Presl

= Myrcia =

Genus of flowering plants in the myrtle family

Myrcia is a genus of plants in the family Myrtaceae, containing about 794 species as of 2025. They are distributed in Central and South America, Mexico, and the Caribbean, with centers of diversity in the Brazilian Cerrado and Atlantic Forests ecoregions. Myrcia was first described as a genus in 1827.

== Selected species ==
- Myrcia acutissima Urb.
- Myrcia adunca Z.Acosta & K.Samra
- Myrcia albobrunnea
- Myrcia albo-tomentosa DC.
- Myrcia almasensis
- Myrcia arenicola Urb.
- Myrcia bella Cambess.
- Myrcia brevispicata McVaugh
- Myrcia calcicola
- Myrcia citrifolia (Aubl.) Urban - Red rodwood
- Myrcia crassa Sobral
- Myrcia crassimarginata
- Myrcia crebra McVaugh
- Myrcia densiflora Poepp.ex Berg
- Myrcia ehrenbergiana (O.Berg) McVaugh
- Myrcia fasciata
- Myrcia floridissima Sobral
- Myrcia flavoviridis (Urb.) Z.Acosta & K.Samra
- Myrcia formosiana DC.
- Myrcia fosteri
- Myrcia grandiflora
- Myrcia guianensis
- Myrcia hanoverensis K.Campbell & Commock
- Myrcia laruotheana Cambess.
- Myrcia lasiantha DC.
- Myrcia lineata
- Myrcia luquillensis (Alain) E.Lucas & A.R.Lourenço
- Myrcia maestrensis (Urb.) Alain
- Myrcia magnifolia (O.Berg) Kiaersk.
- Myrcia manacalensis Urb.
- Myrcia margarettae (Alain) Alain
- Myrcia mucugensis Sobral
- Myrcia multiflora (Lam.) DC.
- Myrcia neocapitata K.Campbell & E.Lucas
- Myrcia neoelegans K.Campbell & K.Samra
- Myrcia neokiaerskovii E.Lucas & K.Samra
- Myrcia neothomasiana A.R.Lourenço & E.Lucas
- Myrcia nodosa (Urb.) K.Campbell & K.Samra
- Myrcia paganii
- Myrcia pallens DC.
- Myrcia peduncularis (Alain) E.Lucas & Acev.-Rodr.
- Myrcia pendula Sobral
- Myrcia pentagona
- Myrcia polyneura (Urb.) Borhidi
- Myrcia portoricensis (Britton) Cedeño-Mald. & Breckon ex F.S.Axelrod
- Myrcia pozasiana (Urb.) Z.Acosta & K.Samra
- Myrcia proctorii (Acev.-Rodr.) Acev.-Rodr. & K.Campbell
- Myrcia pseudomarlierea Sobral
- Myrcia pseudospectabilis Sobral
- Myrcia rostrata DC.
- Myrcia sessilis (McVaugh) A.R.Lourenço & Parra-Os.
- Myrcia simulata (McVaugh) A.R.Lourenço & Parra-Os.
- †Myrcia skeldingii
- Myrcia sphaerocarpa DC.
- Myrcia speciosa
- Myrcia tetraphylla Sobral
- Myrcia tomentosa DC.
- Myrcia uberavensis O.Berg
- Myrcia umbelliformis (Krug & Urb.) K.Campbell & K.Samra
- Myrcia uniflora
- Myrcia venulosa DC.
- Myrcia wilsonii (Griseb.) K.Campbell & K.Samra

=== Formerly placed here ===
- Plinia cauliflora (Mart.) Kausel (as M. jaboticaba Baill.)
