= Rogers McVaugh =

American botanist (1909–2009)

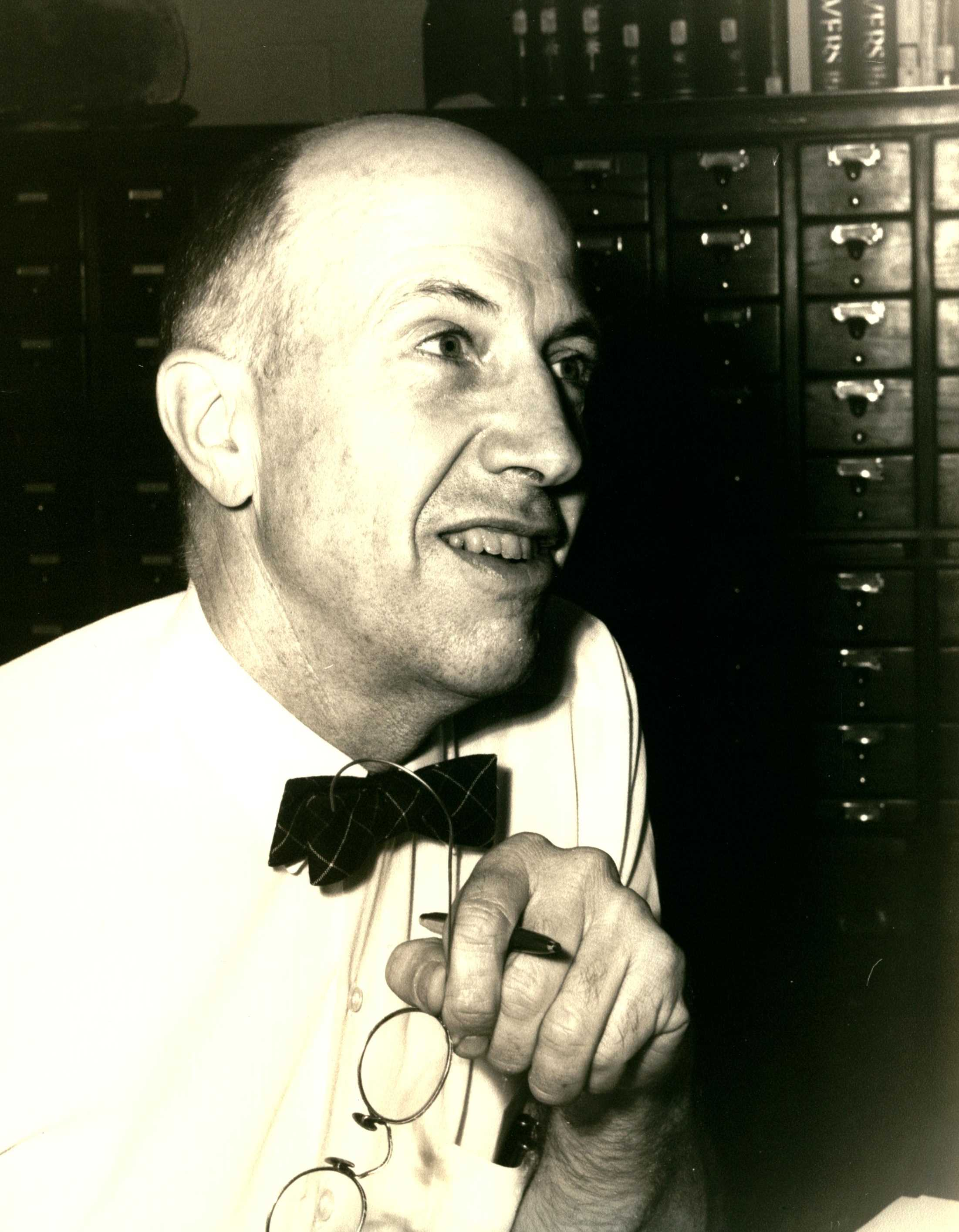
- Born: May 30, 1909; New York City, New York, U.S.
- Died: September 24, 2009 (aged 100); Chapel Hill, North Carolina, U.S.
- Education: Swarthmore College; University of Pennsylvania
- Known for: Systematic botany; Mexican flora
- Spouse: Ruth Beall
- Children: 2
- Scientific career
- Fields: Botany
- Author abbrev. (botany): McVaugh

Rogers McVaugh (May 30, 1909 – September 24, 2009) was a research professor of botany and the UNC Herbarium's curator of Mexican plants. He was also Adjunct Research Scientist of the Hunt Institute in Carnegie Mellon University and a Professor Emeritus of botany in the University of Michigan, Ann Arbor.

== Education ==
Born in New York City, Rogers McVaugh was a brilliant student. He earned the bachelor's degree with highest honors in botany from Swarthmore College in 1931 and a Ph.D in botany from the University of Pennsylvania in 1935.

== Career ==
During his career he held appointments at several universities but spent the majority of his time at the Universities of Michigan (1946 until retirement in 1979) and North Carolina. He specialised in the Compositae, Myrtaceae, Campanulaceae, woody Rosaceae, and the flora of Mexico, as well as botanical history and nomenclature.

- 1935-1938: Instructor then Asst. Professor, Botany, University of Georgia, Athens
- 1938-1946: Associate Botanist, Division of plant exploration & introduction, U.S. Department of Agriculture
- 1946-1951: Associate Professor, Botany, University of Michigan, Ann Arbor
- 1951-1974: Professor, Botany, University of Michigan, Ann Arbor
- 1955-1956: Program Director for Systematic Biology, National Science Foundation, 1974-1979: Harley Harris Bartlett Professor of Botany, University of Michigan, Ann Arbor
- 1946-1979: Curator of Vascular Plants, University of Michigan Herbarium, Ann Arbor
- 1972—1975: Director, University of Michigan Herbarium, Ann Arbor
- 1979–present: Professor Emeritus, Botany, University of Michigan, Ann Arbor
- 1980–present: Research Professor of Botany, University of North Carolina at Chapel Hill
- 1981–present: Adjunct Research Scientist, Hunt Institute, Carnegie Mellon University

McVaugh was an expert in the field, especially of neotropical families and collected extensively in western Mexico particularly in the 1930s and 1940s. These are held in several herbaria in the USA, particularly over 23,000 specimens in the Herbarium of the University of Michigan. Other herbaria with smaller collections include those in University of North Carolina, University of Georgia and University of California.

== Publications ==
McVaugh published about 12 books and 200 shorter articles in history of botany, floristics and systematic botany. These included:

- (2005) Marcus E. Jones in Mexico, 1892
- (1956) A biography of the 19th-century naturalist Edward Palmer.
- (1935) Recent Changes in the Composition of a Local Flora .

McVaugh's last, partially completed work was the Flora Novo-Galiciana, a multi-volume work focusing on the diverse flora of this region in western Mexico.

== Personal life ==
McVaugh and Ruth Beall were married in 1937. She died in 1987. They had two children, Michael Rogers McVaugh and Jenifer Beall McVaugh. McVaugh celebrated his 100th birthday in May 2009. He died on September 24, 2009.

== Honors ==
- International Association for Plant Taxonomy: Vice-President 1969-1972, President 1972-1975
- Festschrift in Taxon, 1979
- Botanical Society of America-Merit Award, 1977
- Sociedad Botánica de Mexico- Gold Medal 1978
- New York Botanical Garden- Henry Allan Gleason award 1984, for Flora Novo-Galiciana vol. 14 (1983)
- American Society of Plant Taxonomists—First Annual Asa Gray award, 1984
- University of Guadalajara, Mexico— First Luz María Villarreal de Puga Medal, 1993
- International Botanical Congress, St. Louis, USA – Millennium Medal, 1999 (one of eight worldwide)
- Smithsonian Institution, Washington, D.C. – First Cuatrecasas Medal for Excellence in Tropical Botany, 2001
- Botanical Society of America - Centennial Award, 2006

The plant genus Mcvaughia was named in his honor in 1979. The genera Macvaughiella, and Chamguava are also named for him.

The Jardín Botánico Rogers McVaugh public park in San Sebastián del Oeste, Jalisco, Mexico was named in his honor in 2009.

== Legacy ==
The Rogers McVaugh Graduate Student Research Grant Fund was set up within the American Society of Plant Taxonomists in 2004 to provide an annual grant in plant systematics.
