= B. grandiflora =

B. grandiflora may refer to:

- Brunfelsia grandiflora, a flowering shrub in the nightshade family
- Breweria grandiflora, a synonym for Bonamia elegans

== See also ==
- Grandiflora (disambiguation)
