= S. grandiflora =

S. grandiflora may refer to:

- Sageraea grandiflora, a plant species endemic to India
- Sarcolaena grandiflora, a plant species endemic to Madagascar
- Sesbania grandiflora, the agati, hummingbird tree or scarlet wisteria, a small tree species
- Solandra grandiflora, a chalice vine species
- Sophronitis grandiflora, an orchid species found from Brazil to Argentina
- Stanhopea grandiflora, an orchid species found from Trinidad to southern tropical America
- Stapelia grandiflora, a flowering plant species

== Synonymms ==
- Stypandra grandiflora, a synonym for Stypandra glauca, a rhizomatous perennial plant species found in Australia

== See also ==
- Grandiflora (disambiguation)
