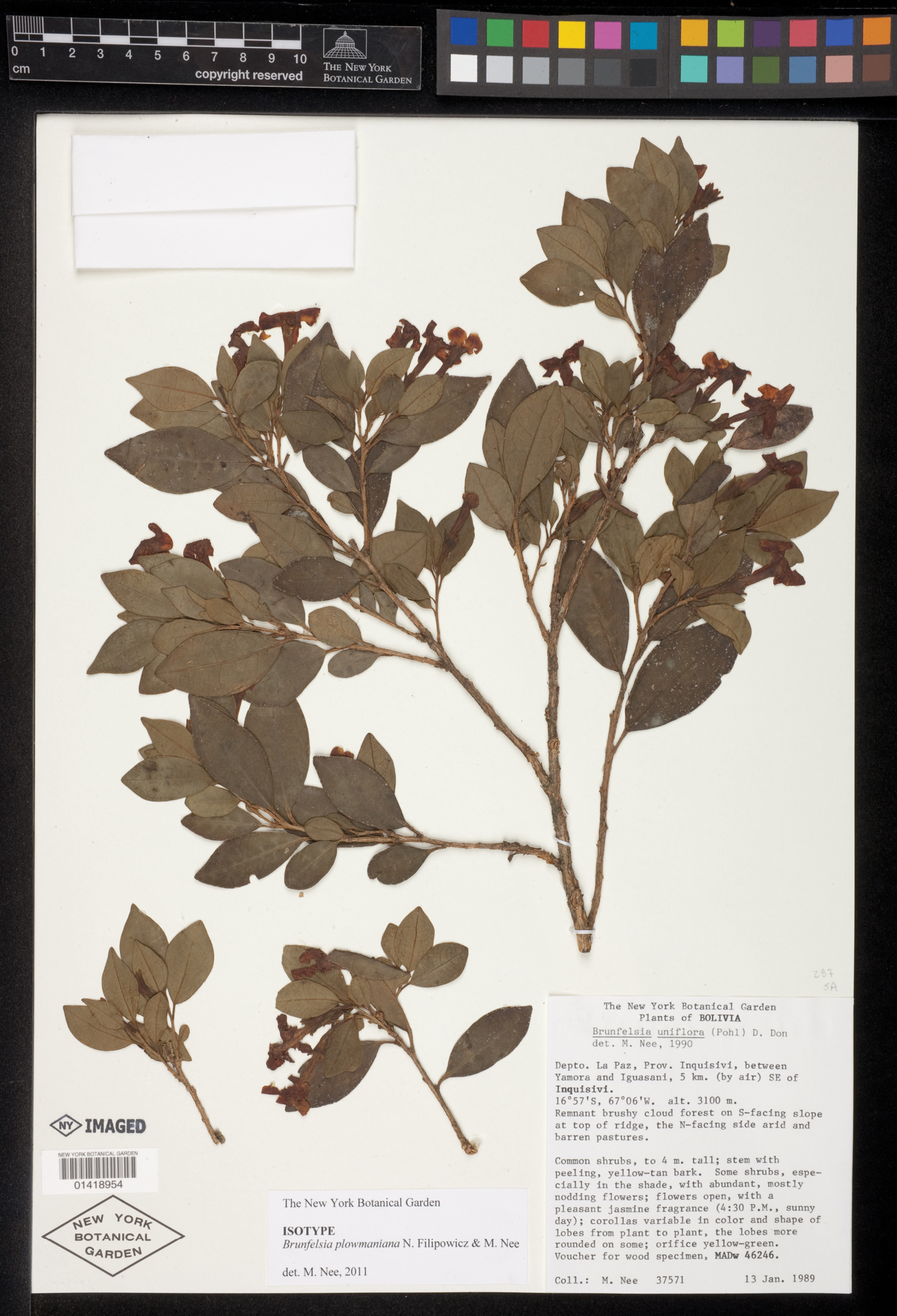

Scientific classification
- Kingdom: Plantae
- Clade: Tracheophytes
- Clade: Angiosperms
- Clade: Eudicots
- Clade: Asterids
- Order: Solanales
- Family: Solanaceae
- Genus: Brunfelsia
- Species: B. plowmaniana

Binomial name
- Brunfelsia plowmaniana N.Filipowicz & M.Nee

= Brunfelsia plowmaniana =

Species of flowering plant

Brunfelsia plowmaniana is a species of flowering plant of the nightshade family that is native to the cloud forests of the Bolivian and Argentinian Andes. It was first described in 2012 on the basis of systematic DNA barcoding of specimens from the genus Brunfelsia. Specimens belonging to the new species had previously been placed in the polymorphic species B. uniflora, which a molecular phylogeny revealed as polyphyletic.

== Etymology ==
The species was named in honor of the American botanist Timothy Plowman (1944-1989) who had worked on neotropical plants of ethnobotanic importance and provided the first and only comprehensive taxonomic treatments of the genus Brunfelsia.

== Molecular diagnosis ==
The new species differs from all other species of Brunfelsia at several nucleotide positions in the plastid ndhF gene and in the nuclear internal transcribed spacer region.

== Description ==
The shrubs or small trees mostly have a single stem of up to 14 cm in diameter at the base, and they branch only above the base, typically 1–4 m and sometimes up to 10 m high. The bark is peeling or flaking, light gray or yellow-brown. Branches with the new twigs are densely covered with up to 0.3 mm long hairs, whereas the older branches exhibit a smooth and glabrous bark. Internodes range from 4–12 mm.

The shiny and dark green leaves are scattered along the branchlets and often also covered with hairs, especially on younger twigs. They vary in size and shape, but are usually widest above the middle with a rather abruptly narrowed apex, similar to many Myrtaceae. The raised and somewhat cartilaginous ring of the corolla throat is reminiscent of that of species of Prestonia (Apocynaceae) from the same geographic region; it probably reflects adaptation to pollinator foraging behaviour. Nothing is known directly of the pollinators, but the floral features described above are shared by other South American brunfelsias for which butterfly pollination has been observed. The stomata are paracytic.

The flower is solitary, terminal and often nodding, fragrant during the day. Both sepals and petals are partially fused and the latter colored violet, though the color fades to white with age, as is common in the South American species of Brunfelsia. The four stamens are adnate to the corolla, and the ovary is bicarpellate and syncarpous. The fruit is obovoid, coriaceous and capsular and reaches about 1 cm in diameter. It is probably green, and perhaps turning dark purple or black when ripe. There are ca. 9 ovoid seeds of about 6 mm in length. There are no observations on fully mature fruits or dispersal of the seeds. Herbarium specimens with ripe or nearly ripe fruits always show them splitting neatly from the top about 1/3 of the way to the base into two equal valves.

== Distribution ==
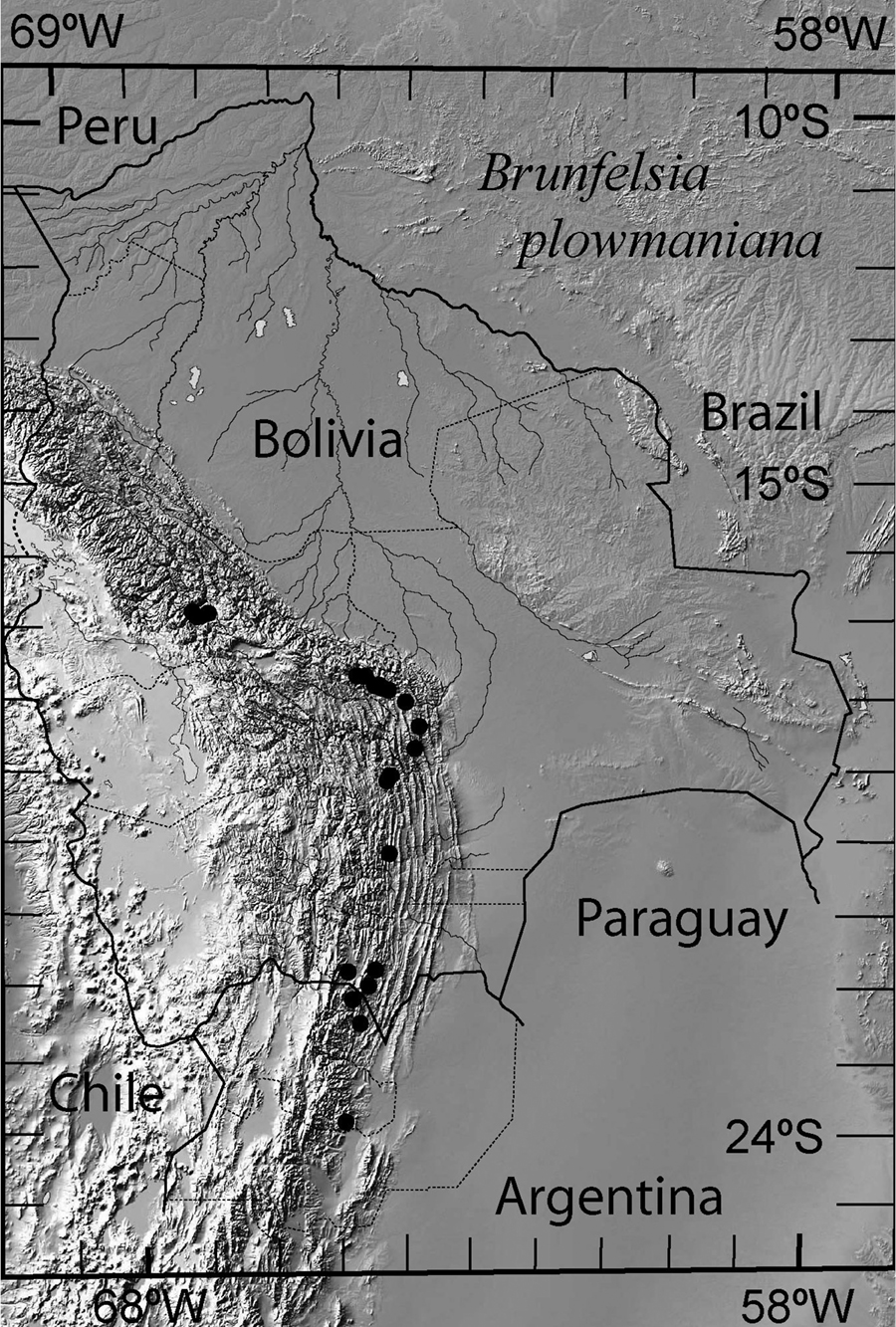
Distribution map of Brunfelsia plowmaniana.

Brunfelsia plowmaniana is known from humid forests in the Provinces of Salta and Jujuy in northwestern Argentina, and the Departments of Santa Cruz, Cochabamba and La Paz (Inquisivi Province) in Bolivia. It grows at altitudes of 1500–3200 m on the predominantly North–South ridges separated by dry to arid scrub in the intervening valleys, perhaps mostly at the lower altitudinal range in the southern part of the distribution and the upper altitudinal range to the north. It has never been collected in the neighbouring Provinces of Sud Yungas, Nor Yungas and Larecaja in the relatively well-explored central and northern parts of the Department of La Paz.

== Habitat ==
Brunfelsia plowmaniana lives exclusively in Andean humid or cloud forests and shares its habitat with tree ferns like Dicksonia sellowiana as well as with members of the Podocarpaceae, Betulaceae, Cunoniaceae, Myrtaceae, Clethraceae and Caprifoliaceae families and numerous other Solanaceae. About one in three specimens of Brunfelsia plowmaniana is closely associated with epiphytic lichens, mosses and liverworts, reflecting the cloud forest habitat.

== Conservation status ==
The species is often found in heavily grazed lower edges of the cloud forest where grazing, deforestation and fires are a threat to local populations. Even though the range is narrow, it is about 800 km long; and many populations are in undisturbed or protected areas.
