= B. densifolia =

B. densifolia may refer to:

- Babingtonia densifolia, a flowering plant
- Berkheya densifolia, a flowering plant
- Brunfelsia densifolia, a nightshade native to Puerto Rico
