= C5H7N3 =

The molecular formula C_{5}H_{7}N_{3} may refer to:

- Brunfelsamidine, a poisonous plant derivative, which has convulsant and neurotoxic effects
- 3,4-Diaminopyridine, compound predominantly used as a drug in the treatment of rare muscle diseases
