= B. portoricensis =

B. portoricensis may refer to:

- Bolbitis portoricensis, a polypod fern
- Borikenophis portoricensis, a snake endemic to Puerto Rico
- Brunfelsia portoricensis, a plant endemic to Puerto Rico
- Buxus portoricensis, an evergreen found in Puerto Rico
