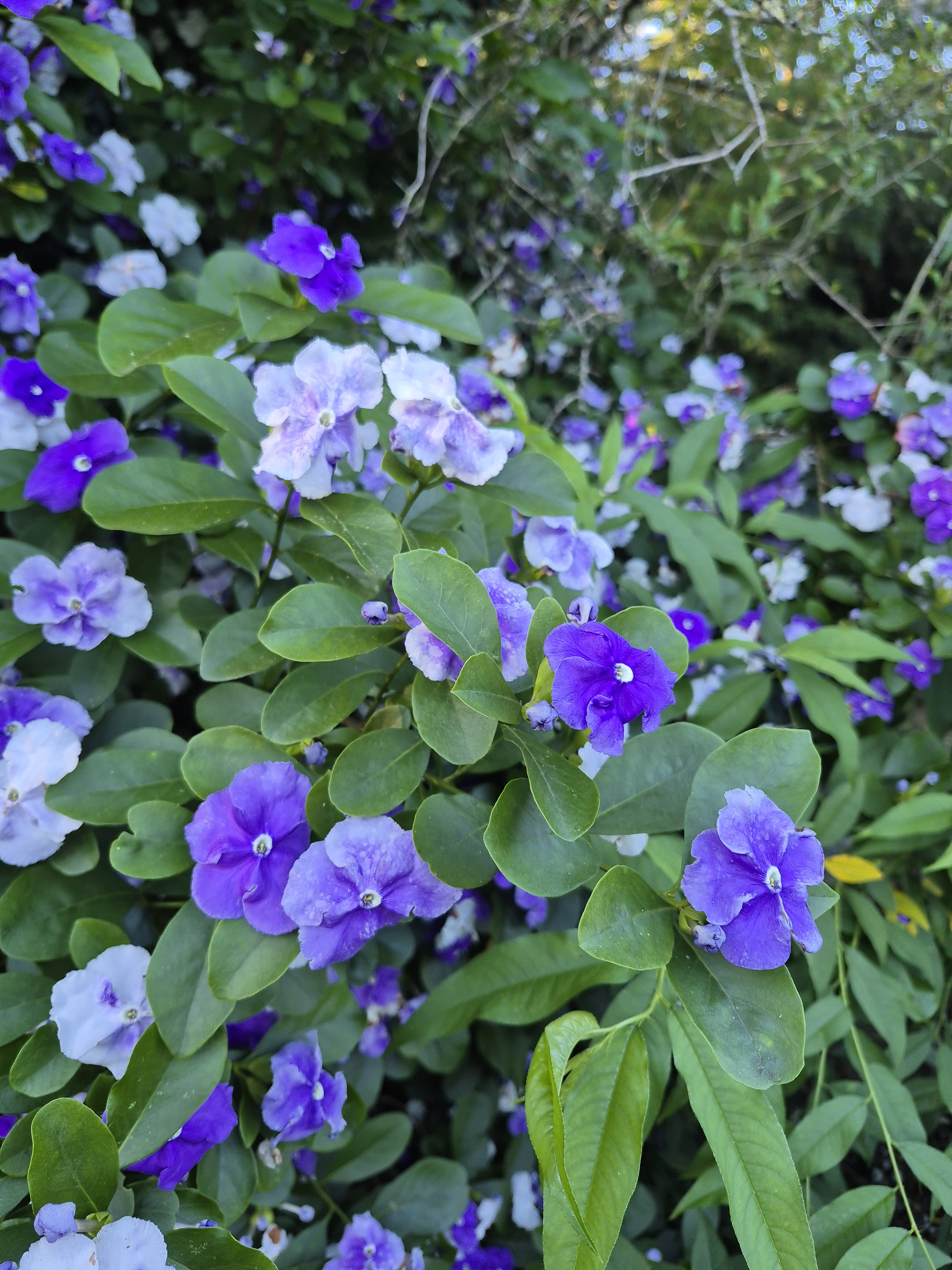
- Brunfelsia sp. in Brazil

Scientific classification
- Kingdom: Plantae
- Clade: Tracheophytes
- Clade: Angiosperms
- Clade: Eudicots
- Clade: Asterids
- Order: Solanales
- Family: Solanaceae
- Subfamily: Petunioideae
- Genus: Brunfelsia; L.

Species
- About 50

Synonyms
- Brunfelsiopsis (Urb.) Kuntze; Brunsfelsia L.; Franciscea Pohl

= Brunfelsia =

Genus of flowering plants

Brunfelsia is a genus of flowering plants belonging to subfamily Petunioideae of the nightshade family Solanaceae. The 50 or so species have been grouped into the three sections: Brunfelsia (circa 22 species), Franciscea (circa 18 species) and Guianenses (circa 6 species), which differ significantly in both distribution and characteristics, although molecular data have revealed that only two sections are natural (monophyletic), namely the Caribbean section Brunfelsia and a common section for all South American species. Linnaeus named the genus for the early German herbalist Otto Brunfels (1488–1534).

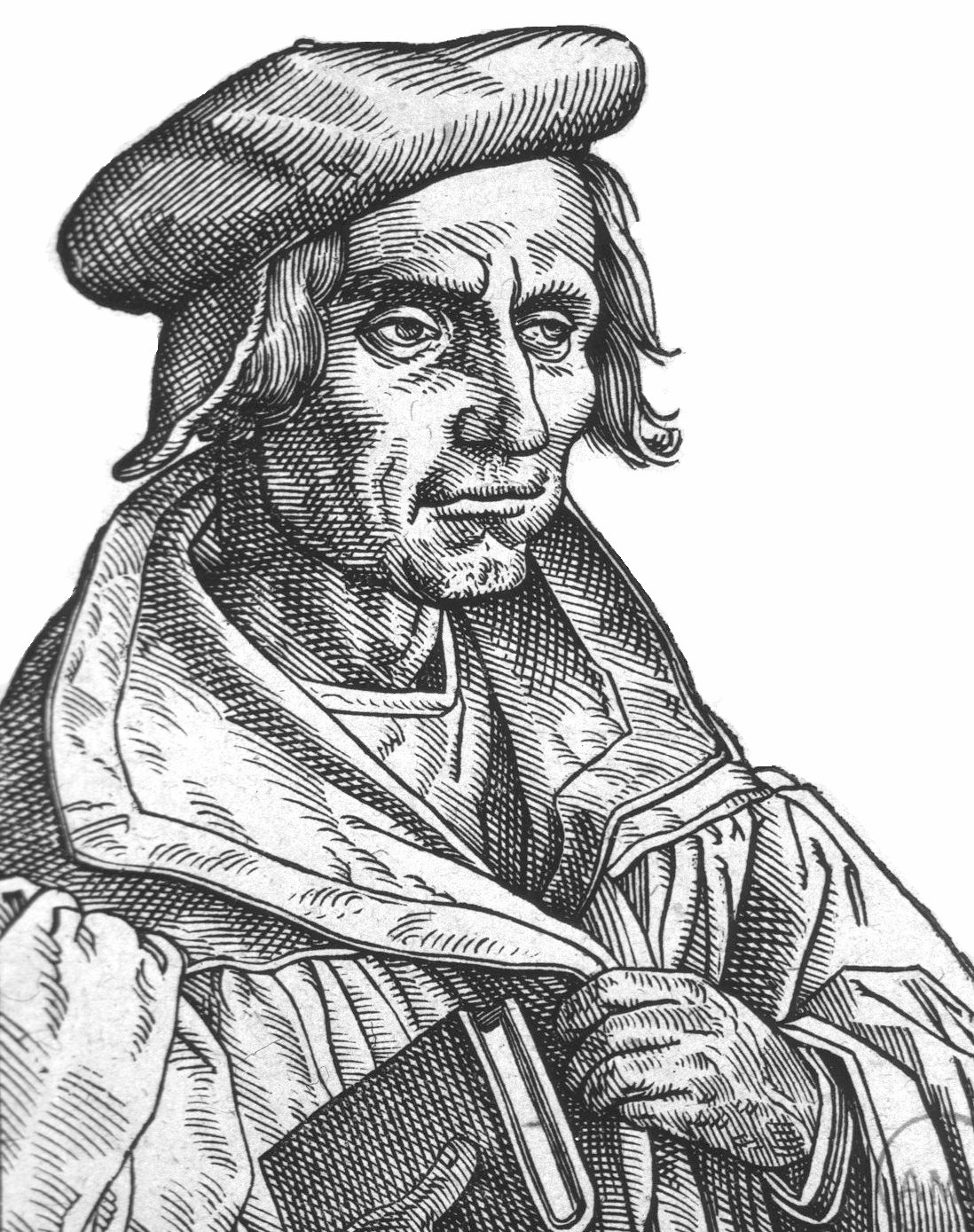
Otto Brunfels, German theologian and botanist in whose honour the genus Brunfelsia is named.

Common names for the genus include raintree, yesterday-today-tomorrow and lady of the night.

Brunfelsia spp. are neotropical shrubs, small trees and (rarely) lianas. The leaves are alternately arranged, simple, and usually oval in shape. The large flowers have salverform corollas with five broad lobes and narrow tubes.

Typical habitat for wild species is light woodland and thickets.

== Taxonomy ==
The genus was described by French botanist and churchman Charles Plumier ex L. and published in Species Plantarum 1: 191 in the year 1753. The type species is Brunfelsia americana.

== Description ==
Shrubs or small trees, without thorns. Leaves simple, entire and petiolate (stalked). Inflorescences in subterminal fascicles or flowers borne singly in leaf axils, often showy and sometimes also night-scented, zygomorphic; calyx campanulate, 5-lobed to approximately half its length; corolla hypocrateriform (having salver-shaped limb above narrow tube), 5-lobed; stamens 4, anthers oblong or elliptical, included and dehiscing longitudinally; ovary bilocular. Fruit a corky berry.

== Ornamental use ==
Species in cultivation include Brunfelsia americana and Brunfelsia pauciflora. Brunfelsia australis is being actively promoted by growers for its tricolored blooms and drought resistance. As its specific name suggests, B. australis is the Brunfelsia species with the most southerly distribution, the plant occurring as far south as the Argentinian province of Buenos Aires.

== Chemistry and toxicity ==
Like many other species belonging to the Solanaceae, some (possibly all) members of this genus contain toxic and medicinal alkaloids. These are known to be poisonous to domestic animals such as cats, dogs, and horses due to their brunfelsamidine content. Toxicity in dogs manifests with strychnine-like gastrointestinal, neurological and cardiac symptoms.

The roots of certain Brunfelsia species have been designated as containing compounds hazardous to human health according to a compendium published in 2012 by the European Food Safety Authority. These compounds include indole alkaloids of the β-carboline group such as harmine, tetrahydroharmine, harmaline, manacine, manaceine, and also derivatives of dimethyltryptamine (DMT) and amidines such as pyrrole 3-carboximidamide.

According to early accounts in the literature, symptoms of poisoning by the medicinal species B. grandiflora include dizziness, exhaustion, nausea, hypersalivation, muscle weakness, lethargy, facial nerve paralysis, mouth pains, swollen tongue, numbness in the extremities, paraesthesias (including tingling and feelings of unbearable coldness) tremors, and blurred vision. At higher dose, there are reports of delirium, sustained mental confusion, and possible blindness. Modern reports have compared the experience to the effects of an overdose of nicotine upon non-smokers.

== Species ==
Species include:

- Brunfelsia americana – American brunfelsia, lady-of-the-night
- Brunfelsia australis – Jasmine of Paraguay
- Brunfelsia chiricaspi – chiricaspi
- Brunfelsia densifolia – Serpentine Hill raintree
- Brunfelsia grandiflora – largeflower brunfelsia, chiricsanango
- Brunfelsia jamaicensis
- Brunfelsia lactea – vega blanca
- Brunfelsia latifolia
- Brunfelsia membranacea
- Brunfelsia nitida – Cuban raintree
- Brunfelsia pauciflora
- Brunfelsia plowmaniana
- Brunfelsia portoricensis – Puerto Rican raintree
- Brunfelsia splendida
- Brunfelsia uniflora – manacá

== Legal status ==
=== United States ===
==== Louisiana ====
Except for ornamental purposes, growing, selling or possessing Brunfelsia spp. is prohibited by Louisiana State Act 159.

== Gallery ==
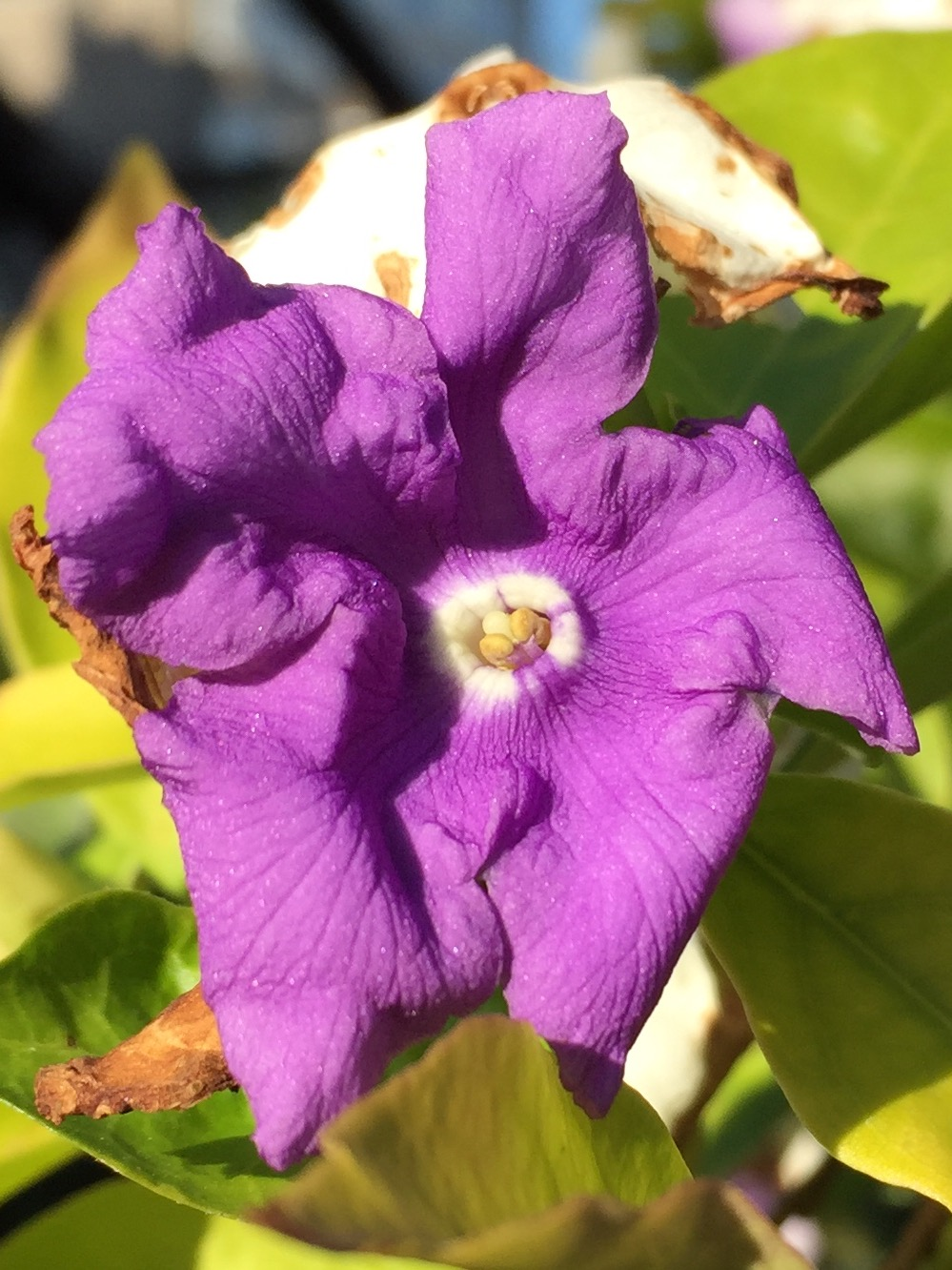
Brunfelsia pauciflora (Cham. & Schltdl.) Benth.

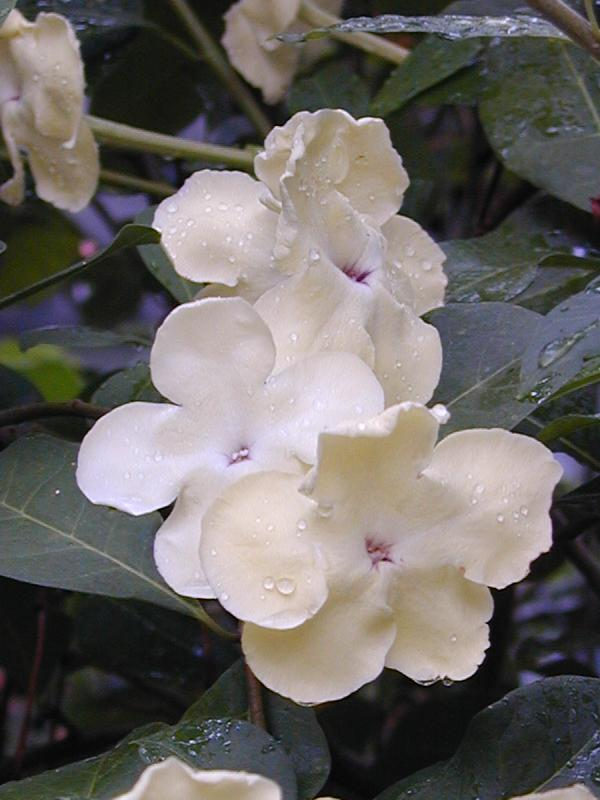
Brunfelsia americana

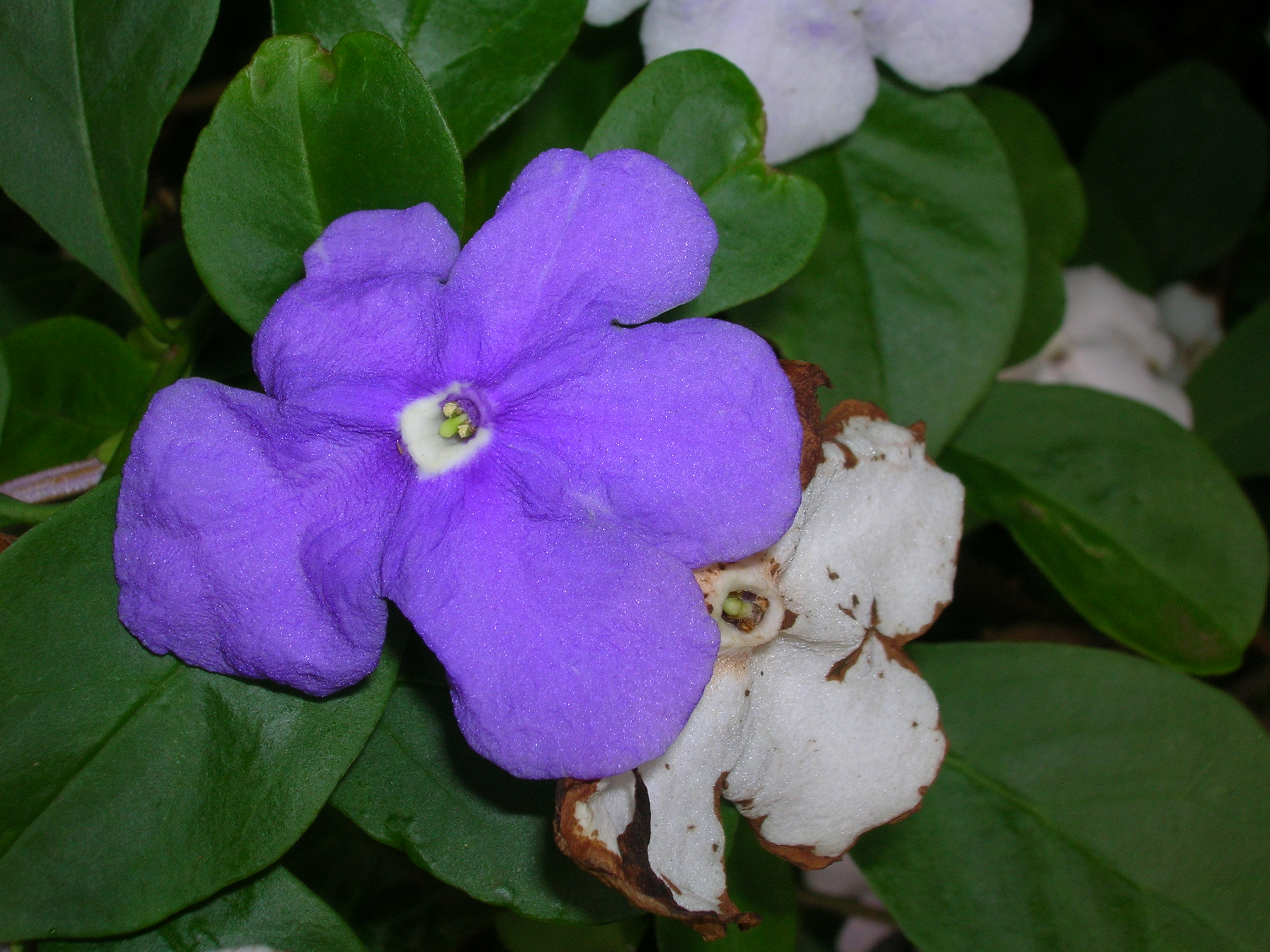
Brunfelsia australis : age-related colour-change of flower.

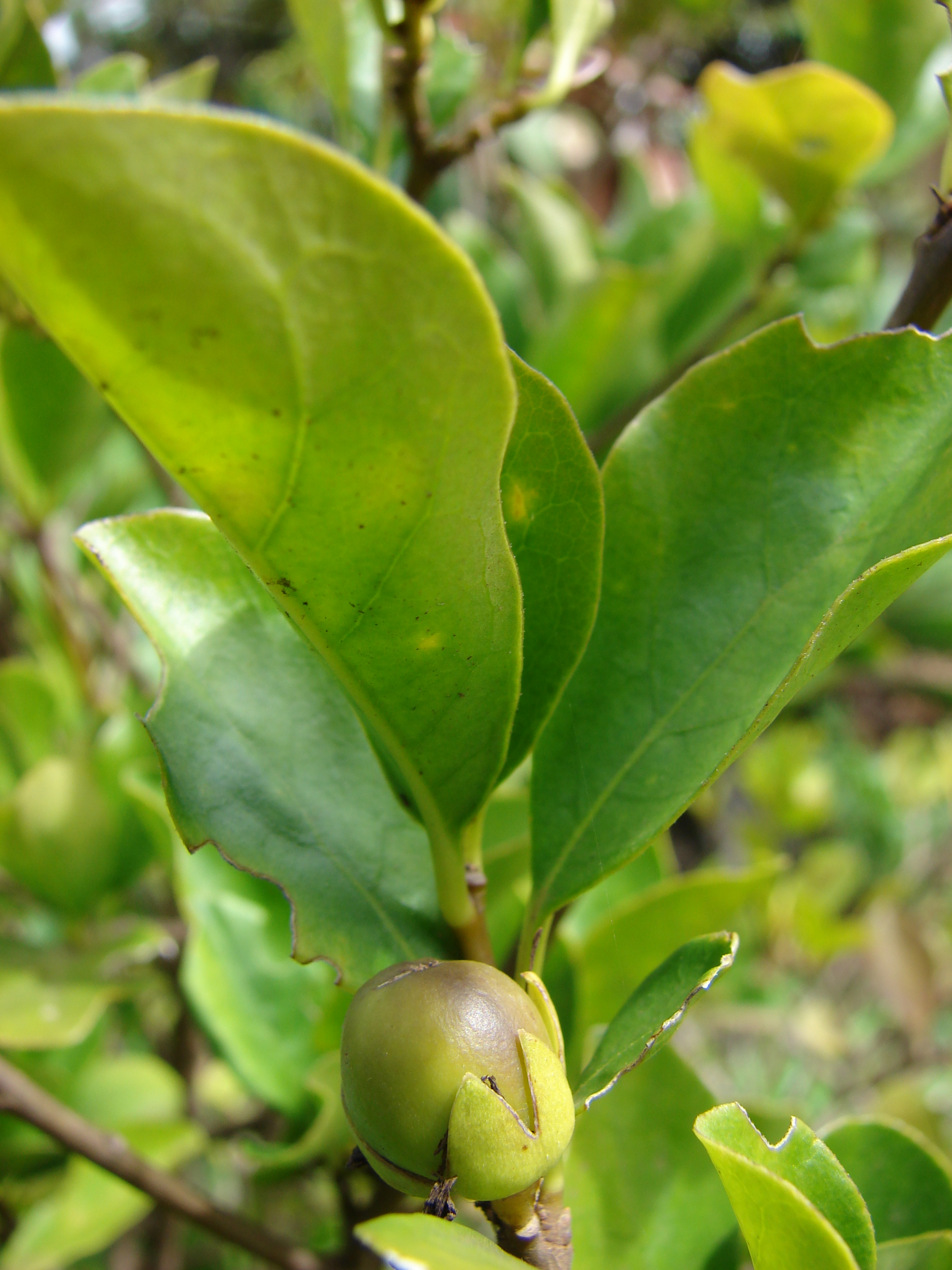
Brunfelsia australis : ripening coriaceous berry, showing accrescent calyx.

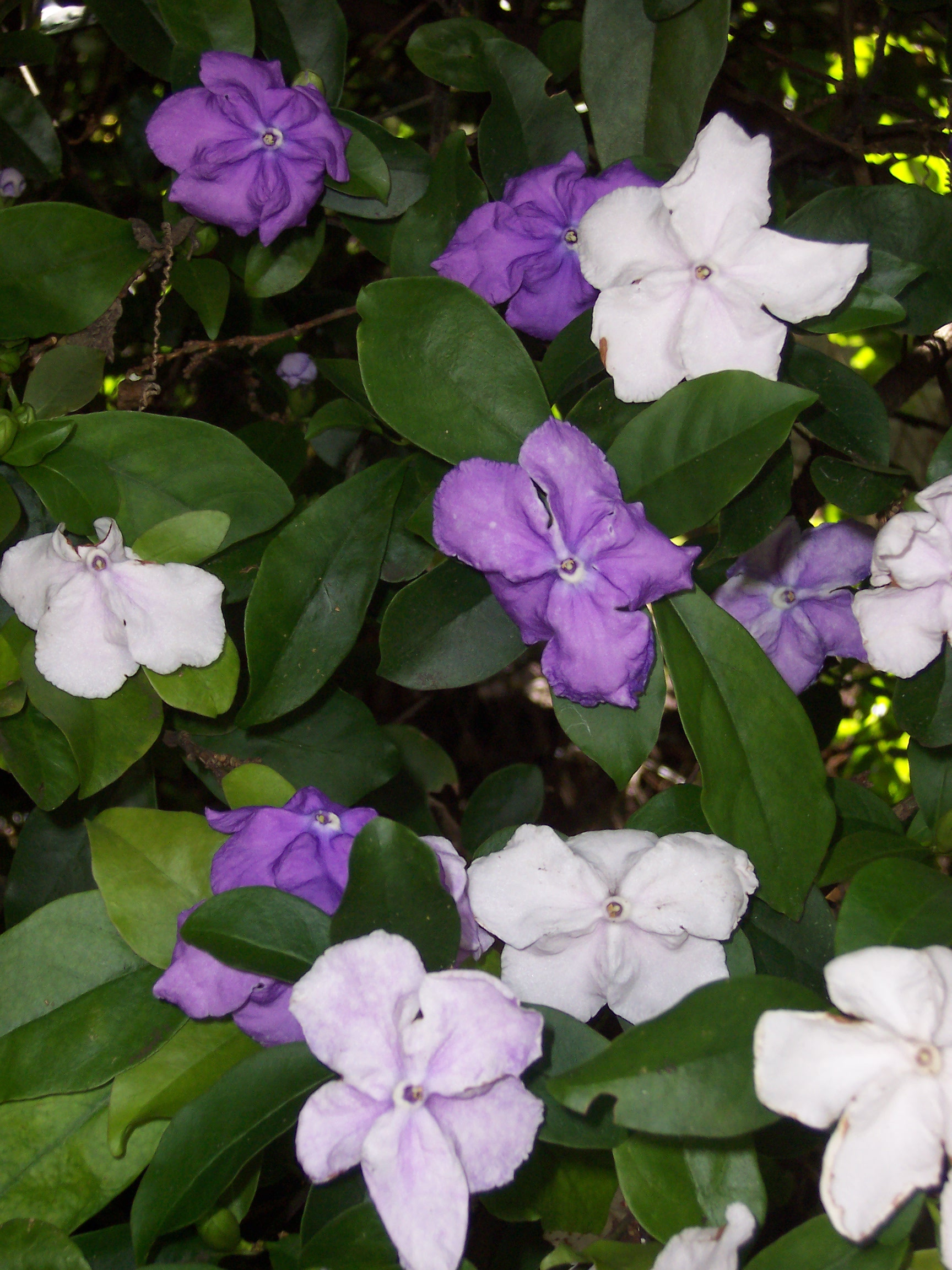
Brunfelsia uniflora : mid-shot of plant in flower.

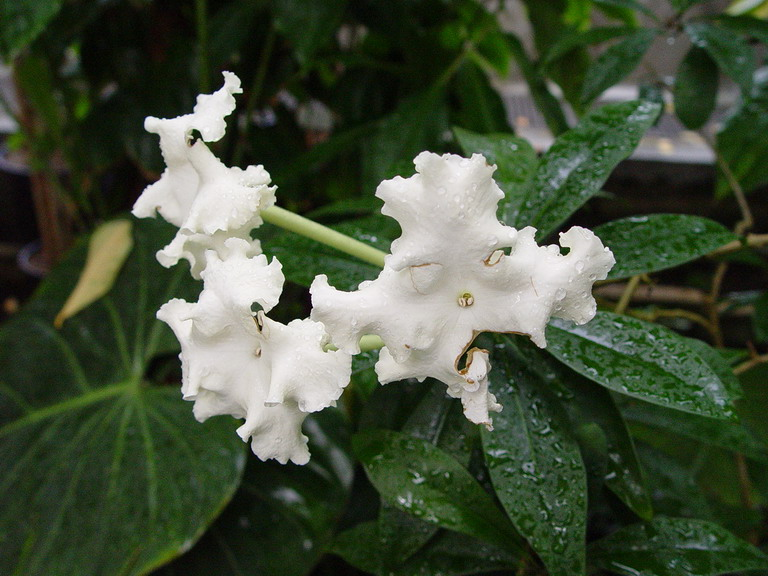
Brunfelsia undulata : foliage and attractive flowers with long corolla tubes and characteristic undulate corolla lobe margins.

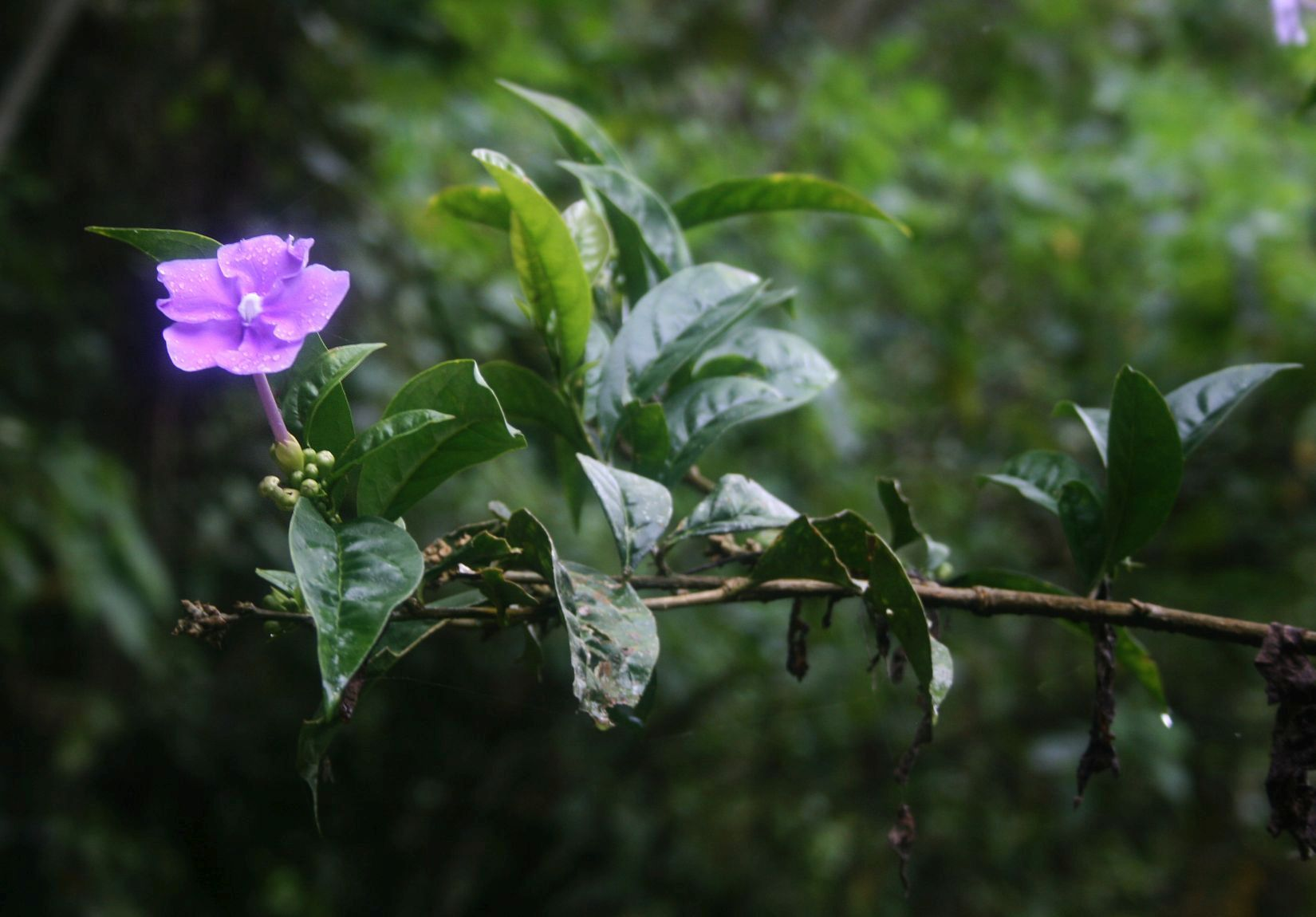
Brunfelsia grandiflora : flowering branch seen in profile, showing buds and single bloom.

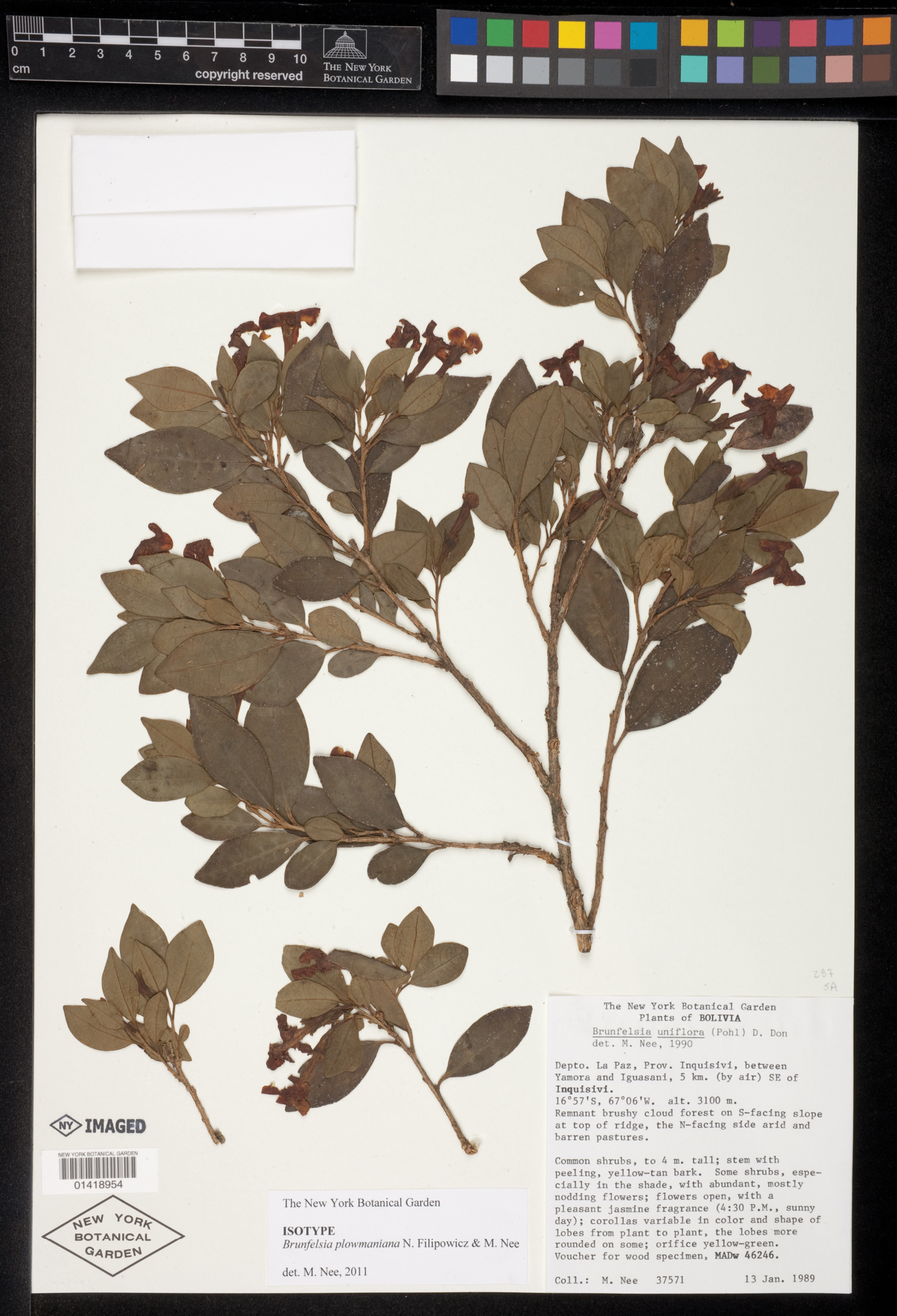
Brunfelsia plowmaniana : type specimen of Brunfelsia species named in honour of Brunfelsia expert the late Dr. Timothy Plowman.
