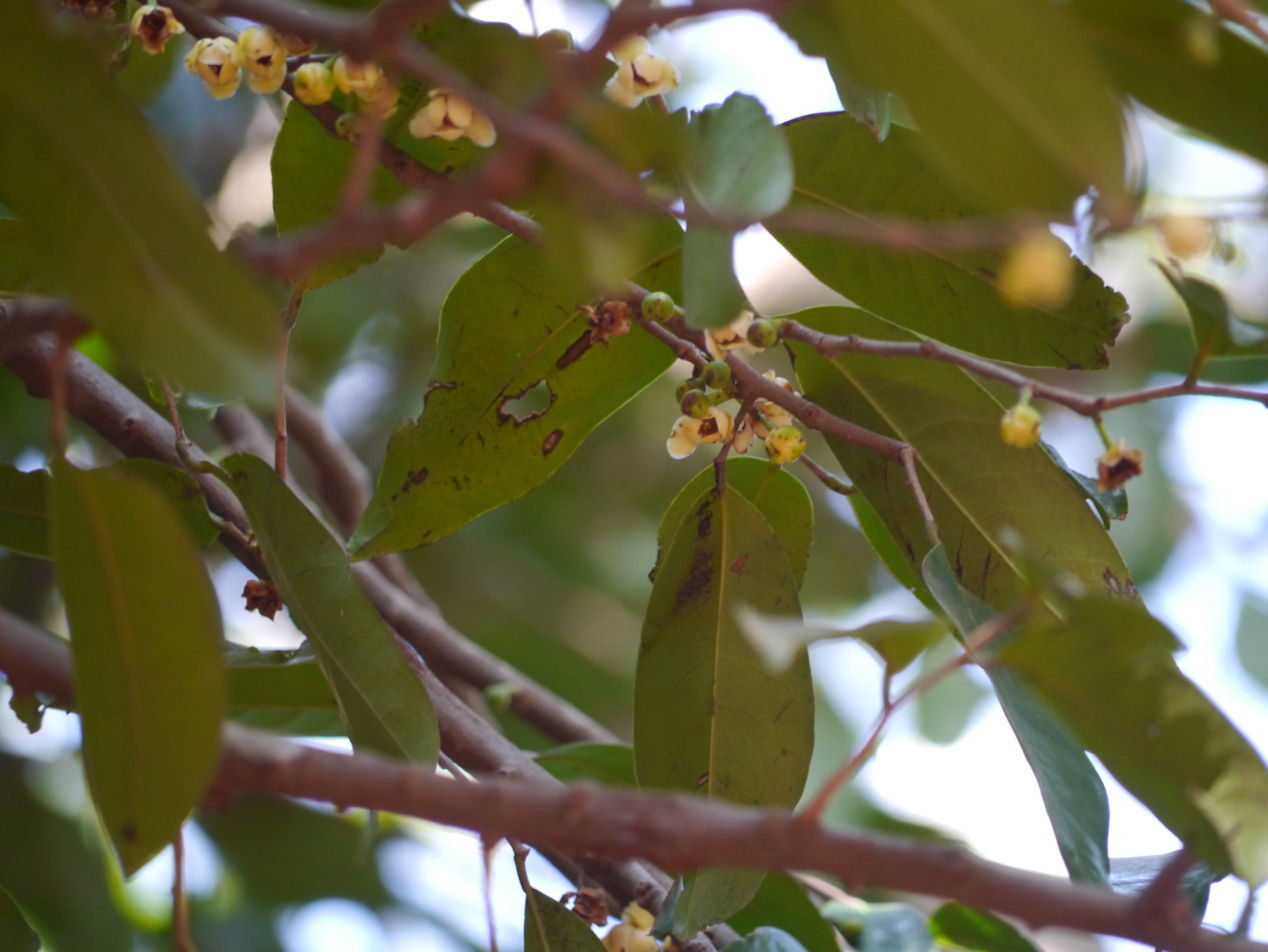

Conservation status
- Near Threatened (IUCN 2.3)

Scientific classification
- Kingdom: Plantae
- Clade: Tracheophytes
- Clade: Angiosperms
- Clade: Magnoliids
- Order: Magnoliales
- Family: Annonaceae
- Genus: Sageraea
- Species: S. laurifolia

Binomial name
- Sageraea laurifolia (Grah.) Blatter

= Sageraea laurifolia =

Species of plant

Sageraea laurifolia is a species of plant in the Annonaceae family. It is endemic to India. It is known in Malayalam as കാനക്കൈത(kanakkaita) or മഞ്ഞനാര(mannanara).
