= Brunfelsia membranacea =

Conservation status
- Vulnerable (IUCN 2.3)

Scientific classification
- Kingdom: Plantae
- Clade: Tracheophytes
- Clade: Angiosperms
- Clade: Eudicots
- Clade: Asterids
- Order: Solanales
- Family: Solanaceae
- Genus: Brunfelsia
- Species: B. membranacea

Binomial name
- Brunfelsia membranacea Urb.

Species of flowering plant

Brunfelsia membranacea is a species of flowering plant in the family Solanaceae, the nightshades. It is endemic to Jamaica.
