= Plowmania =

Scientific classification
- Kingdom: Plantae
- Clade: Tracheophytes
- Clade: Angiosperms
- Clade: Eudicots
- Clade: Asterids
- Order: Solanales
- Family: Solanaceae
- Genus: Plowmania; Hunz. & Subils
- Species: P. nyctaginoides

Binomial name
- Plowmania nyctaginoides (Standl.) Hunz. & Subils

Synonyms
- Brunfelsia nyctaginoides Standl.

Species of flowering plant

Plowmania is a monotypic genus of flowering plants belonging to the family Solanaceae. The only species is Plowmania nyctaginoides.

Fully hardy, fast-growing evergreen climber, stems up to 5 m (16.4 ft) long. It has 4-angled stems, pinnate leaves, up 7 cm (2.8 in) long. From spring to autumn, it produces racemes of tubular orange flowers, up to 2.5cm 2.5 cm (1.0 in) long.

It is native to Mexico and Guatemala. Growing on volcanic peaks at high-elevations.

The genus name of Plowmania is in honour of Timothy Plowman (1944–1989), an American ethnobotanist best known for his intensive work over the course of 15 years on the genus Erythroxylum, and the cultivated coca species in particular. The Latin specific epithet of nyctaginoides means resembling Nyctago, a synonym of the genus Mirabilis. Both the genus and the species were first described and published in Kurtziana Vol.18 on page 127 in 1986.
