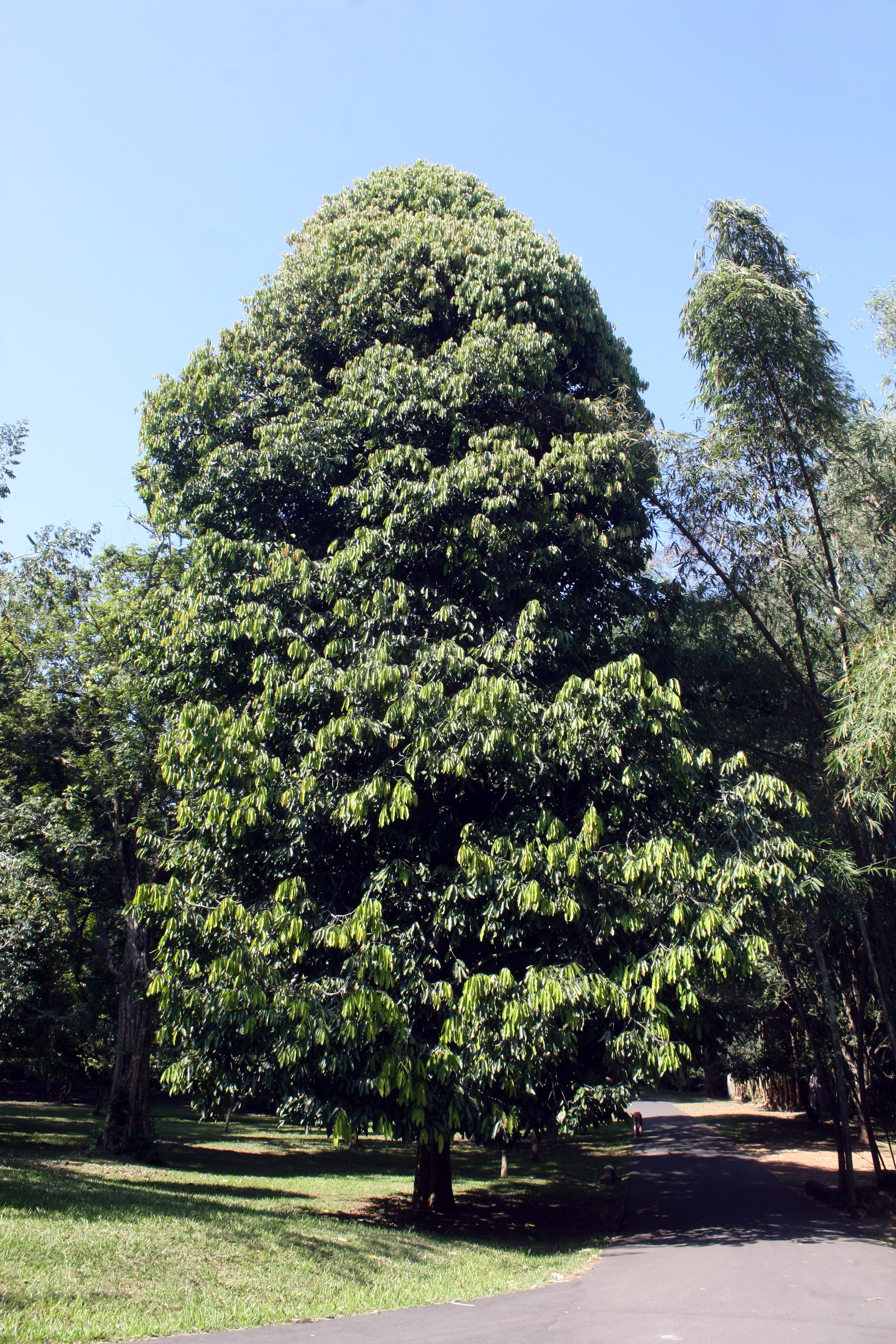

Conservation status
- Near Threatened (IUCN 3.1)

Scientific classification
- Kingdom: Plantae
- Clade: Embryophytes
- Clade: Tracheophytes
- Clade: Spermatophytes
- Clade: Angiosperms
- Clade: Magnoliids
- Order: Magnoliales
- Family: Annonaceae
- Genus: Sageraea
- Species: S. thwaitesii

Binomial name
- Sageraea thwaitesii Hook.f. & Thomson

Synonyms
- Bocagea dalzellii (Bedd.) Hook.f. & Thomson; Bocagea thwaitesii (Hook.f. & Thomson) Hook.f. & Thomson; Sageraea dalzellii Bedd.; Sageraea grandiflora Dunn

= Sageraea thwaitesii =

Species of flowering plant

Sageraea thwaitesii is a species of flowering plant in the Annonaceae family. It is a tree native to Sri Lanka and to the Western Ghats of Kerala in southwestern India.
