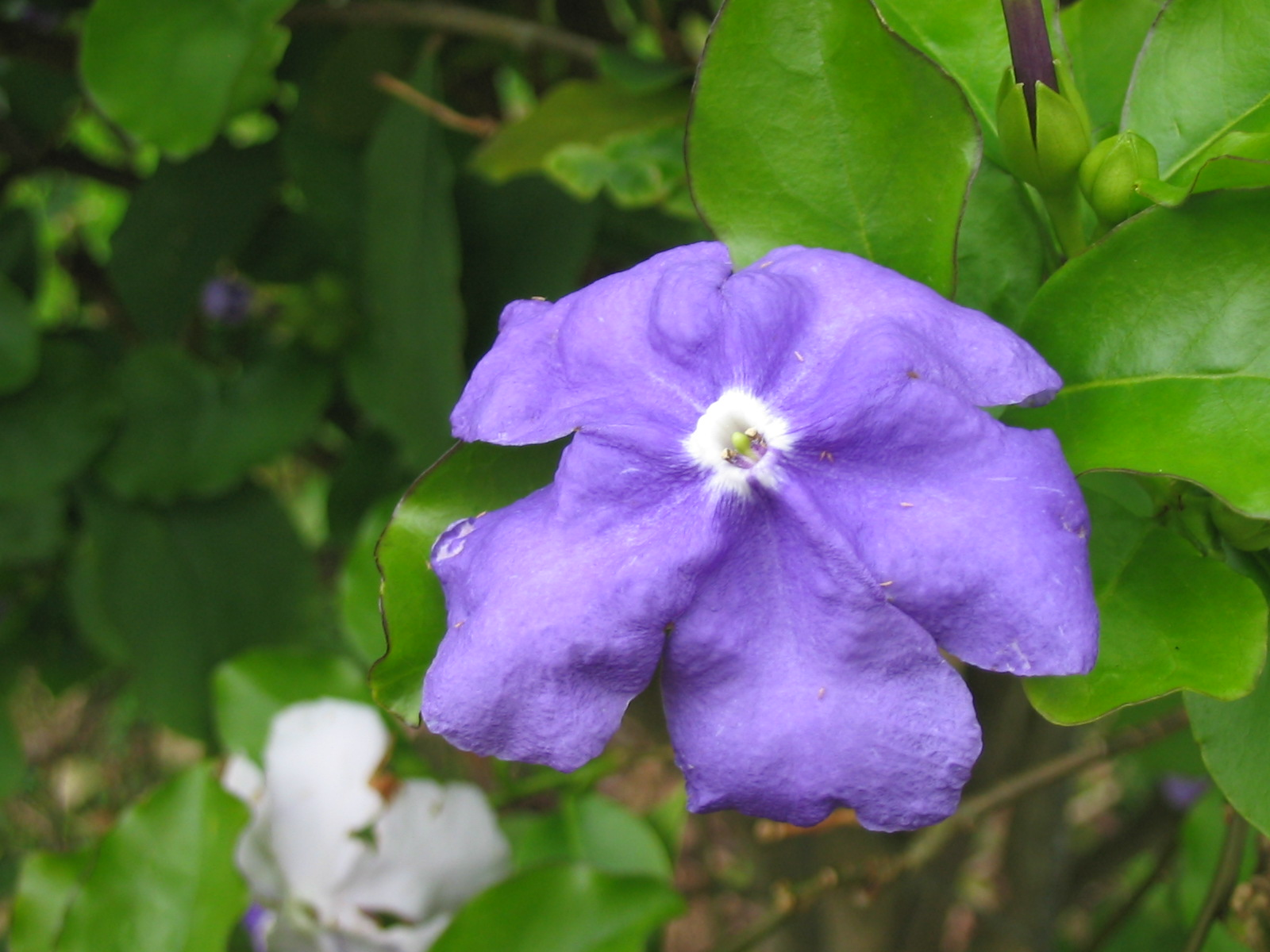

Scientific classification
- Kingdom: Plantae
- Clade: Tracheophytes
- Clade: Angiosperms
- Clade: Eudicots
- Clade: Asterids
- Order: Solanales
- Family: Solanaceae
- Genus: Brunfelsia
- Species: B. latifolia

Binomial name
- Brunfelsia latifolia (Pohl) Benth.

= Brunfelsia latifolia =

Species of flowering plant

Brunfelsia latifolia, commonly known as yesterday-today-tomorrow and kiss me quick, is a species of flowering plant in the nightshade family. Endemic to Brazil, it is an evergreen shrub that becomes semi-deciduous in cooler areas and grows up to 1.8 meters (6 feet) in height.

== Description ==
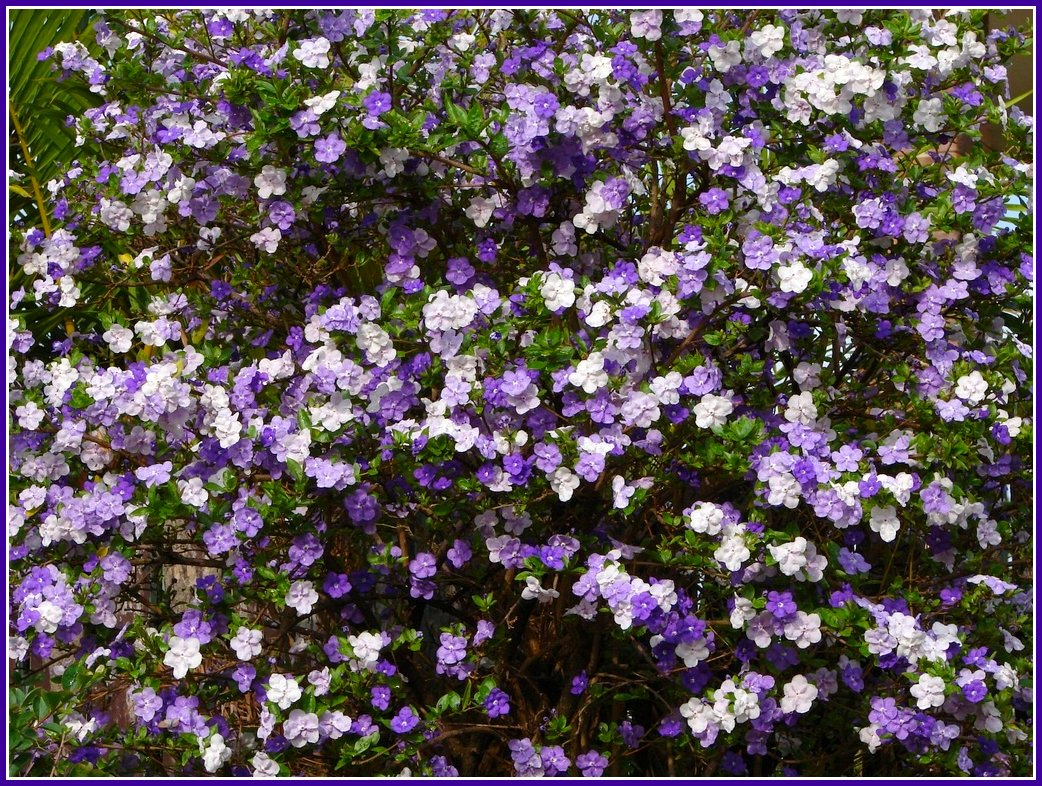
The shrubby plant in view.

Brunfelsia latifolia is a 0.2 to 1 m high shrub with strongly branched growth. The branches spring close to the base, are often zigzag-like shaped and covered with leaves. The bark is thin, light brown to greyish. The young branches are light brown, the distance between the internodes is about 1 cm.

The leaves vary greatly in their shape, they are almost sessile, the petiole is only 1 to 4 mm long, glabrous and dark purple colored. The leaf blade is 4 to 9 cm long and 2.2 to 5.5 cm wide, elliptic to oblong or ovate to reverse ovate. To the front, the leaf is pointed, blunted or rounded, occasionally provided with a small tip or bulged. The leaf base is dull to wedge-shaped, rarely cut. The top of the leaf is dull or shiny dark green, the underside is dull and light green. Occasionally there are some fine trichomes along the midrib. On each side of the leaf, five to eight side veins extend from the midrib, most of which are straight.

=== Inflorescences and flowers ===
Even at a height of only 30 cm, plants of the species can flower. The terminal, compact inflorescences consist of three to 20 non-fragrant flowers. The inflorescence axis is 3 to 7 mm long and glabrous. Below each flower are one or two foliage-like bracts, 1 to 10 mm long, lanceolate and ciliate. The flower stalks are light green, 6 to 8 mm long, slender and glabrous or sparse glandular hairy, on the fruit of the stalk thickens.

The calyx is 9 to 13 mm long, tubular-bell-shaped, glabrous or slightly glandular hairy, light green and smooth. The calyx teeth are 2 to 3 mm long, upright or bent back, triangular to lanceolate. At the top they are pointed. The chalice is leathery on the fruit, clearly streaked with veins and enclosing the fruit.

The crown is initially pale purple, but fades to white. The petal is 15 to 20 mm long and 2 mm in diameter, about twice as long as the goblet. It is slightly glandular hairy, pale purple at the base, whitening towards the top. The thickening at the transition to the Kronsaum is white, rounded or square. The coronary band itself has a diameter of 20 to 30 mm, it is projecting and forms a level. The underside is white. The corolla lobes are almost the same size. The upper part is usually a little smaller, about 5 mm long, the tip is almost cut off. The other lobes are about 8 mm long and rounded at the top.

The four stamens originate in the upper half of the petals and do not extend beyond them. They are white, slender, and cylindrical, with the upper pair measuring about 2 mm and the lower pair about 1 mm in length. The anthers are roughly 1 mm long, brown, and circular to kidney-shaped.

The ovary is pale green, egg-shaped, and about 2 mm high. The style is slender, white, and curved near the tip. The stigma is light green and slightly bilobed, with the two lobes differing in size.

=== Fruits and seeds ===
The fruits are cup-enclosed capsules 11 to 13 mm in length and 8 to 10 mm in diameter. They are ovate and pointed at the top, smooth, glabrous and dark green. The pericarp is thin-walled, drying on maturity, crusty and only springing up late.

Each fruit contains about ten to twelve seeds. These are 5 to 6 mm long and measure 3 mm in diameter. They are oblong-elliptic and angled. The surface is dark brown and grained like a net. The embryo is 4 mm long, almost straight, the cotyledons are 1.5 mm long and ovate.

== Gallery ==
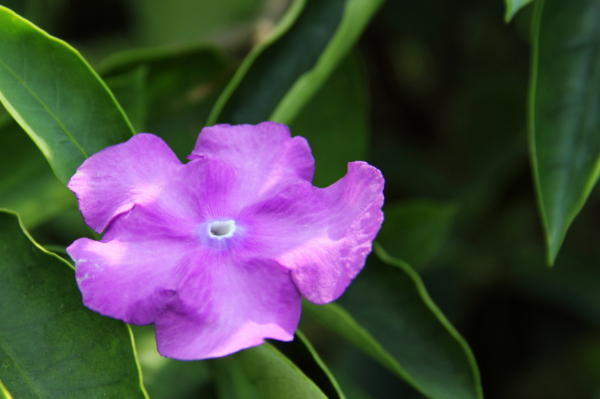

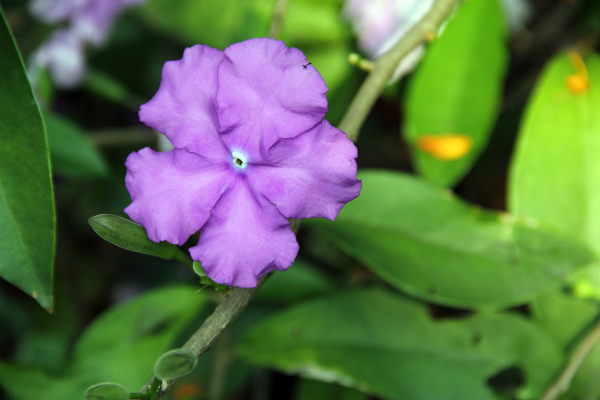

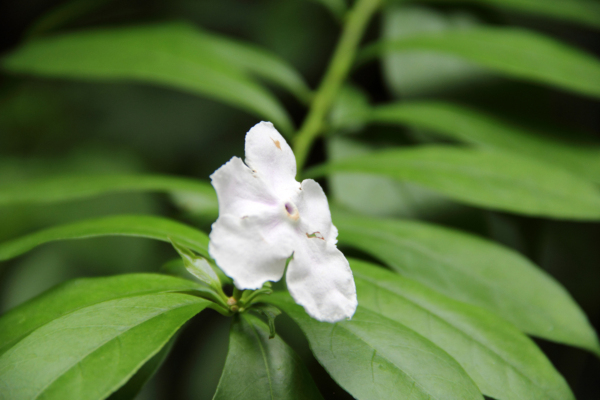

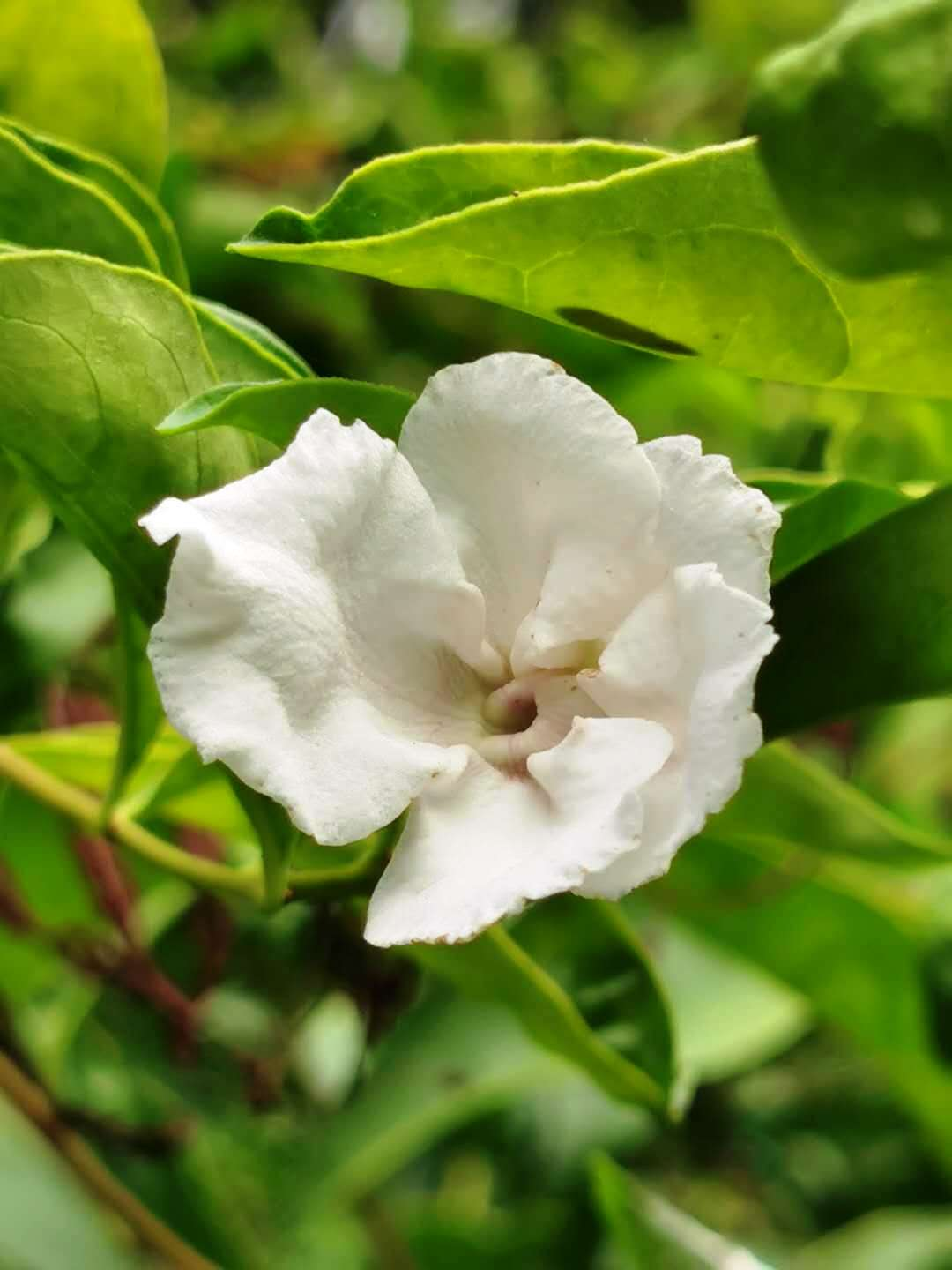

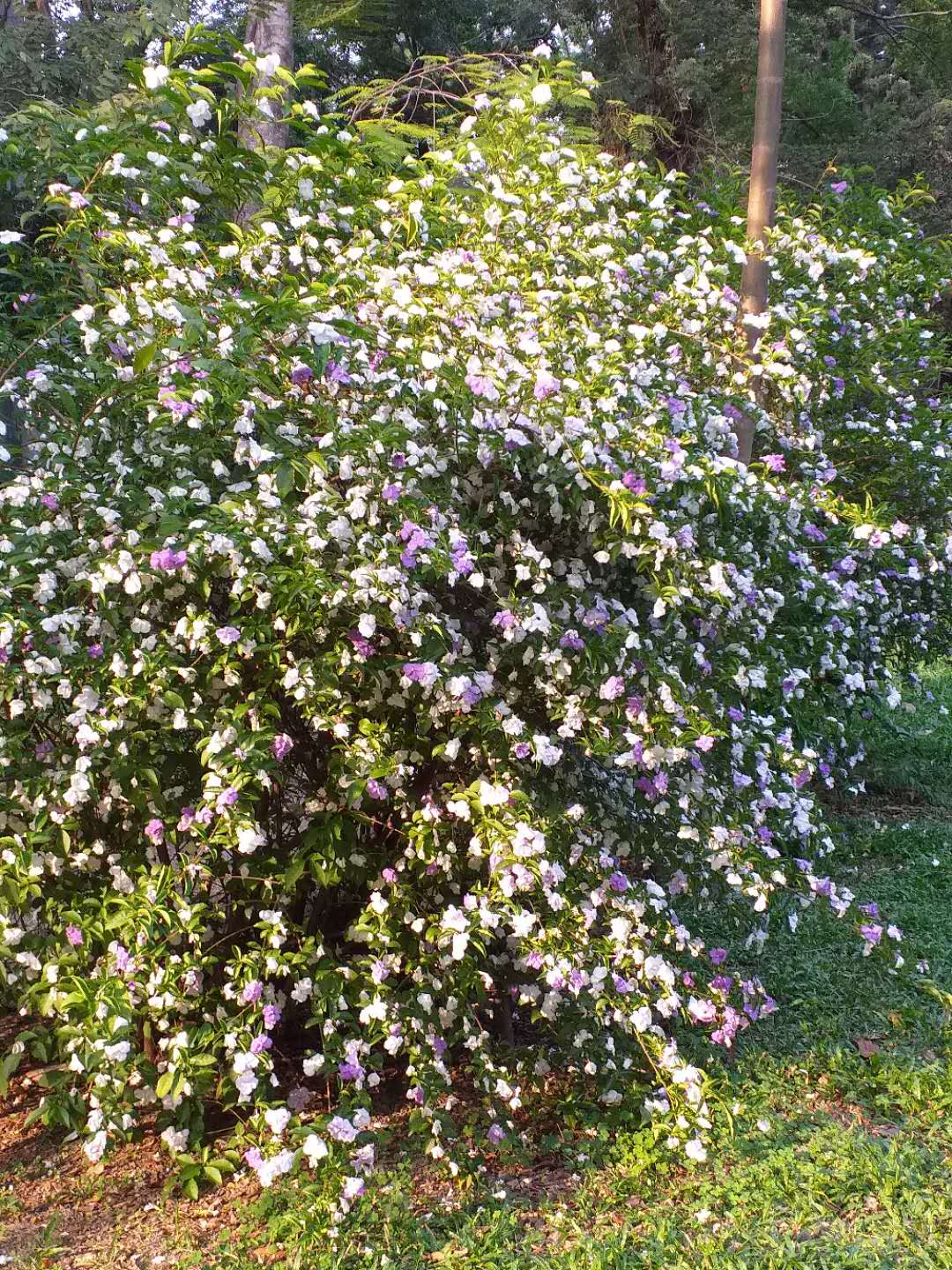

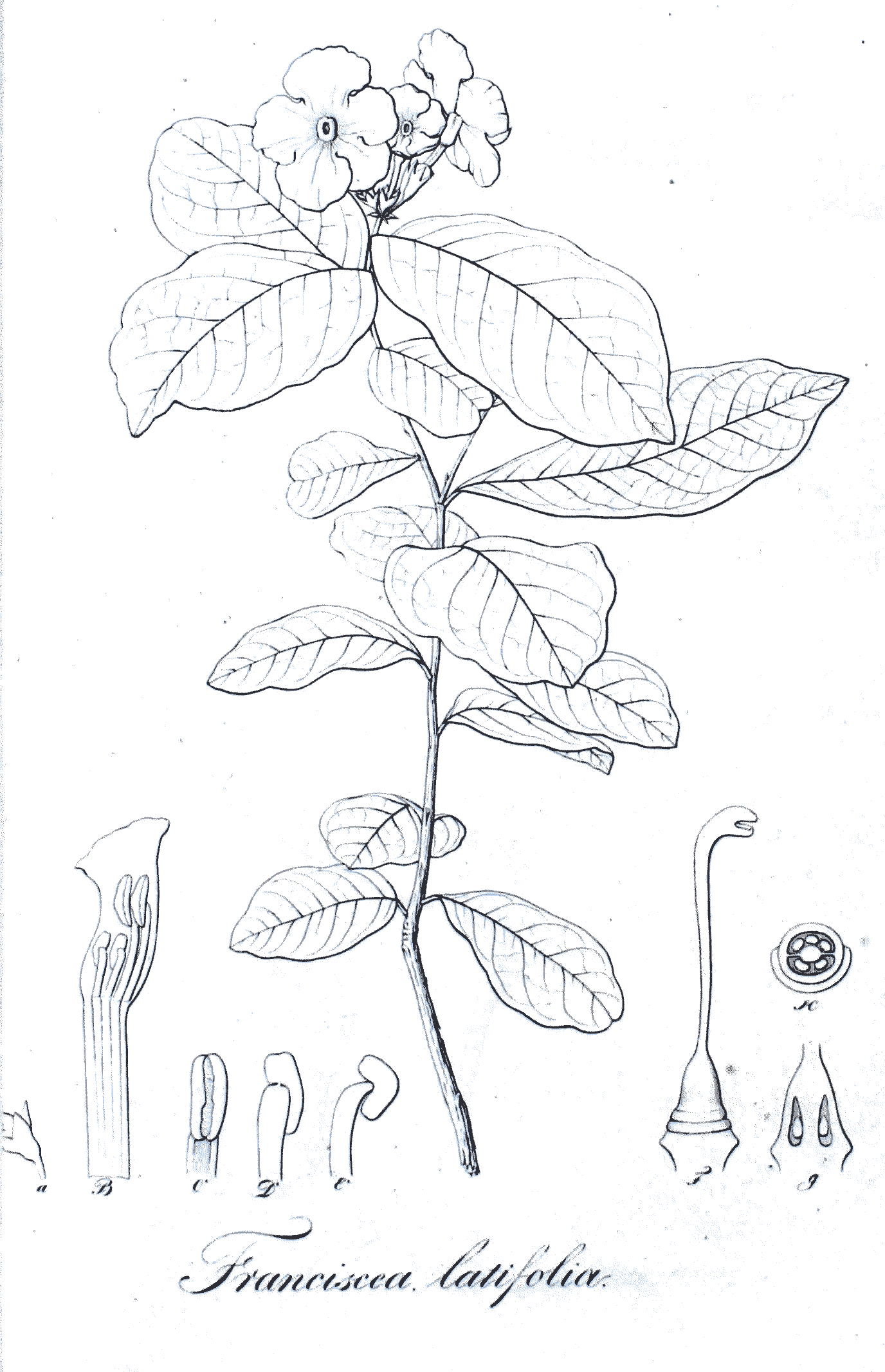

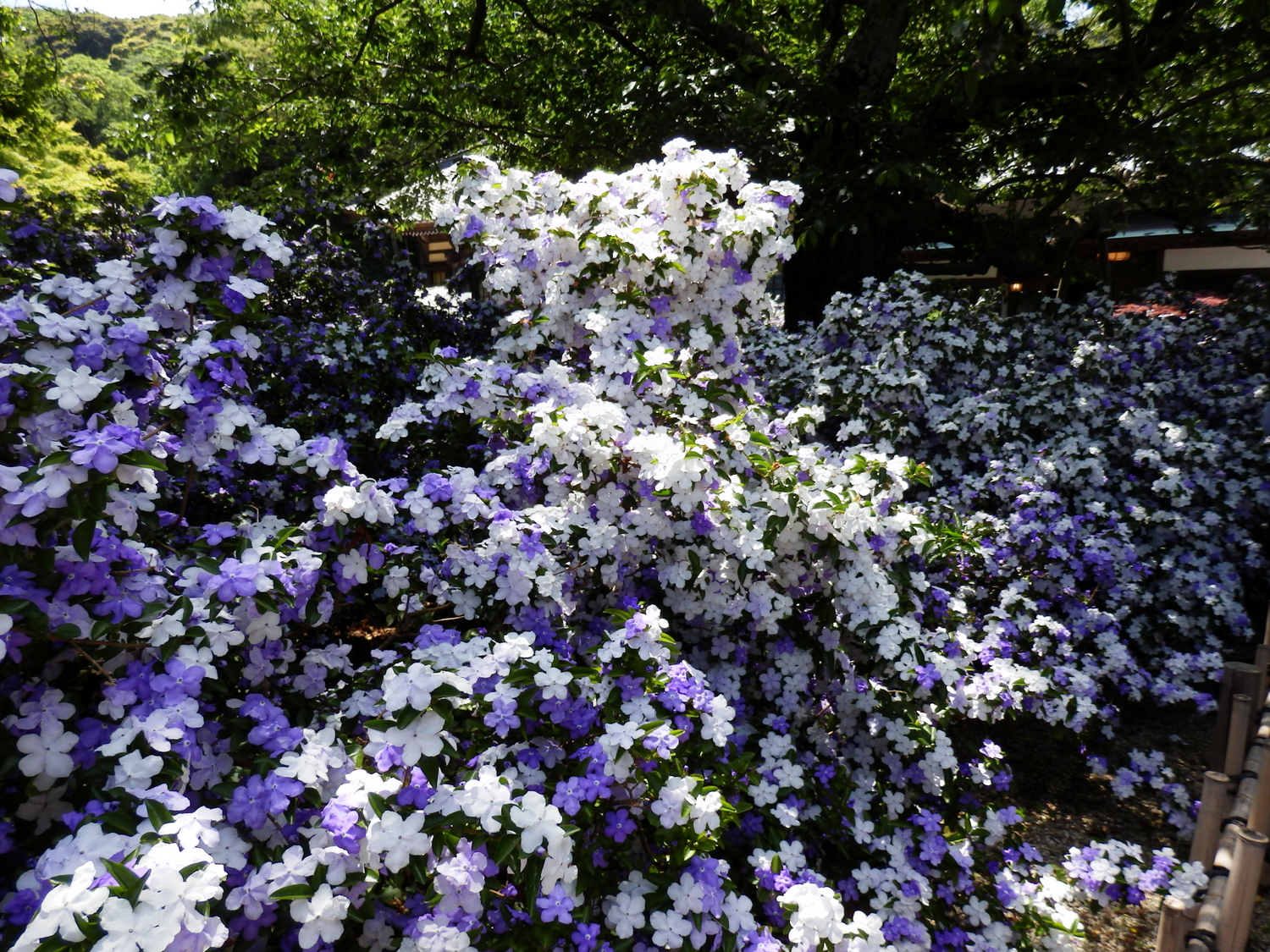
Prolifically flowering shrub

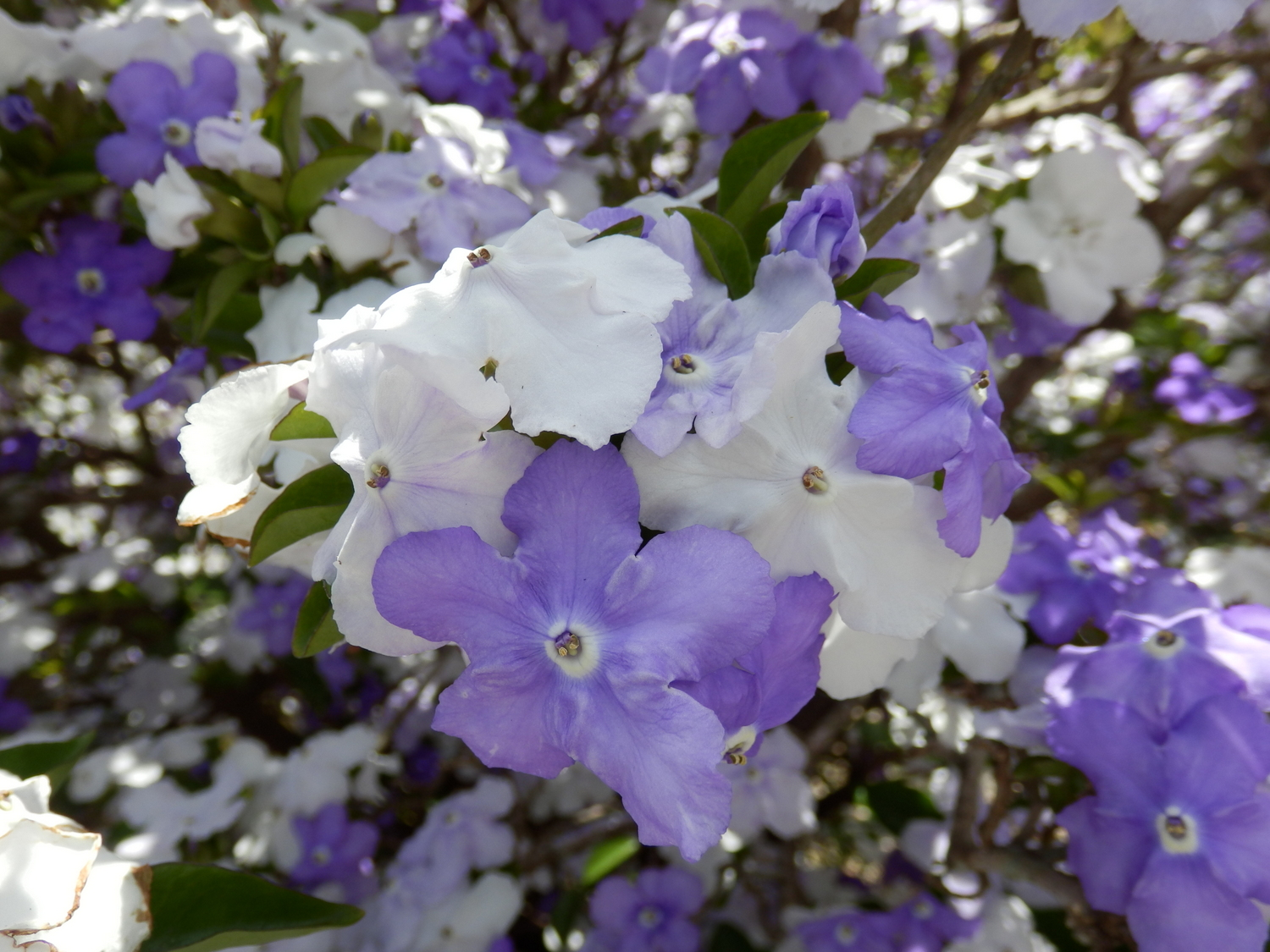
Close-up of flowers

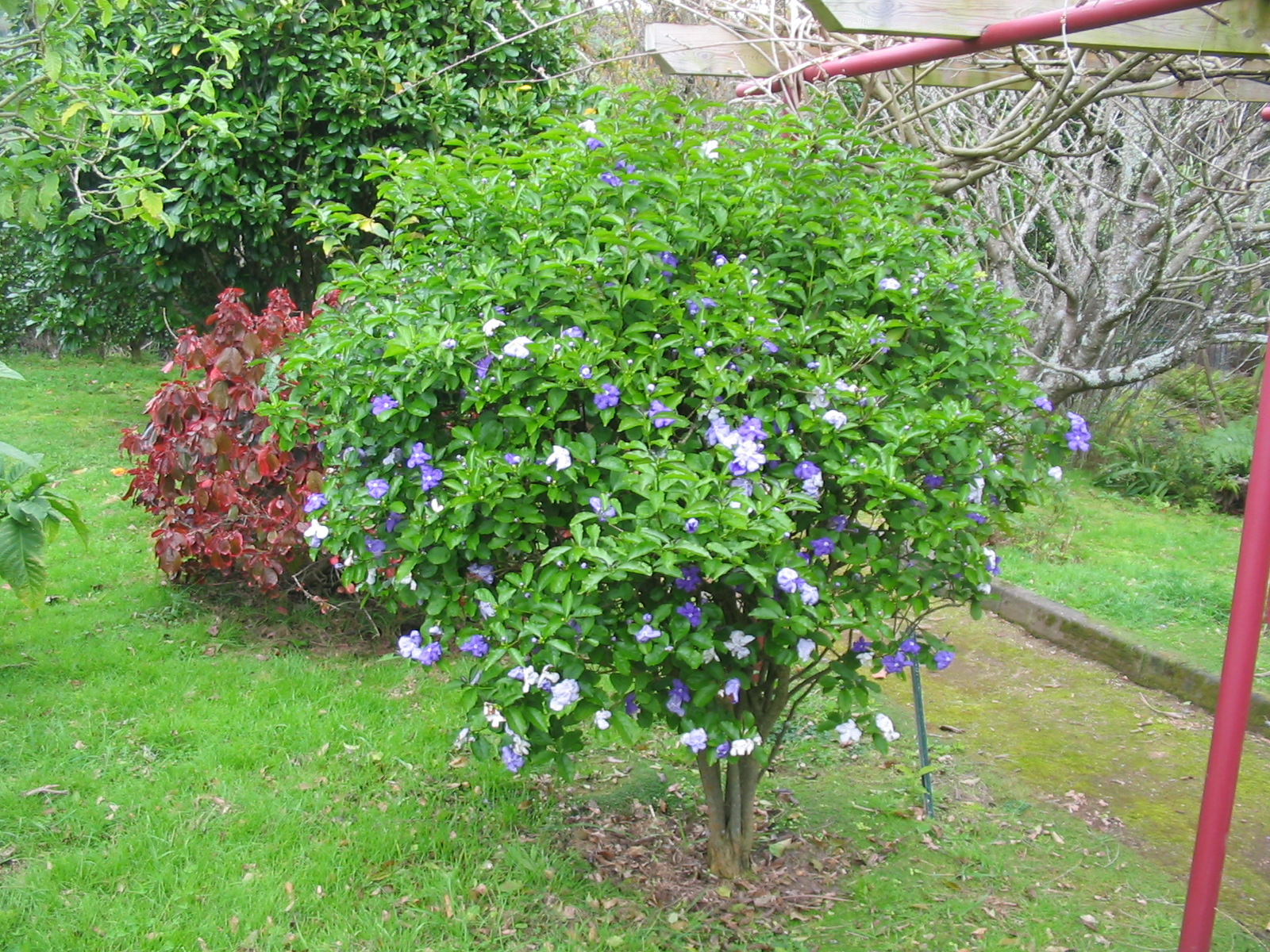
A neatly pruned shrub

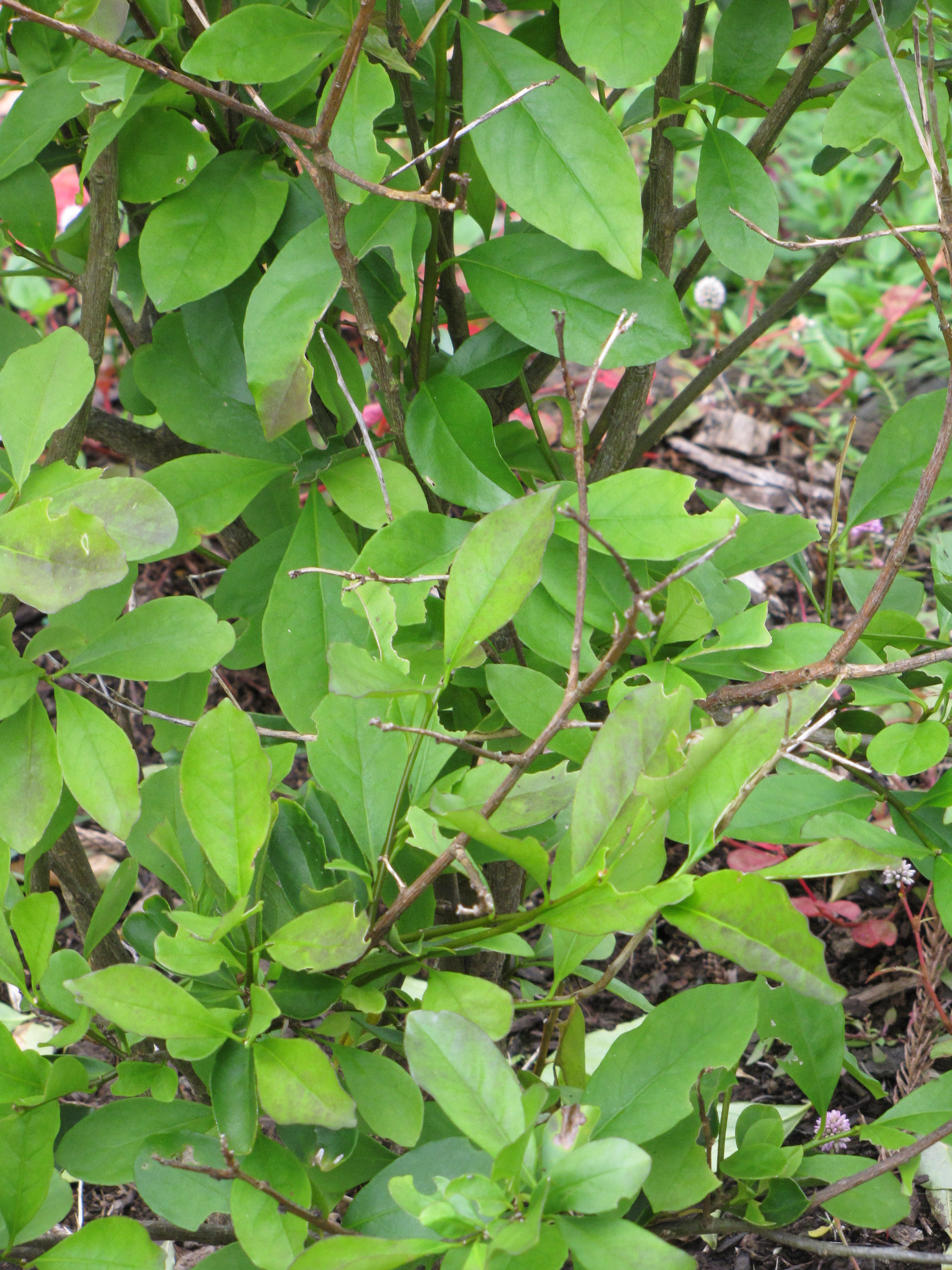
Leaves

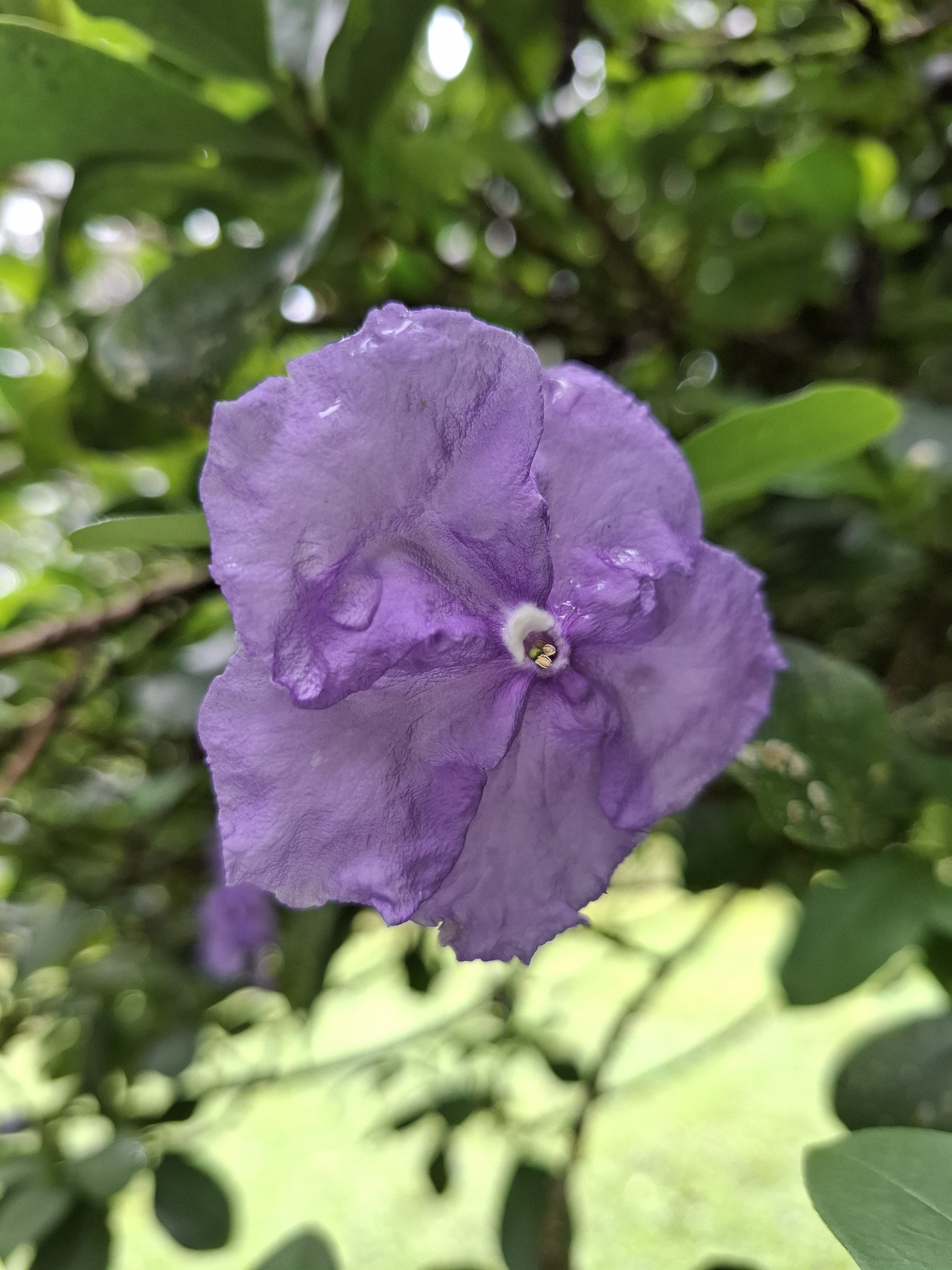
Flower

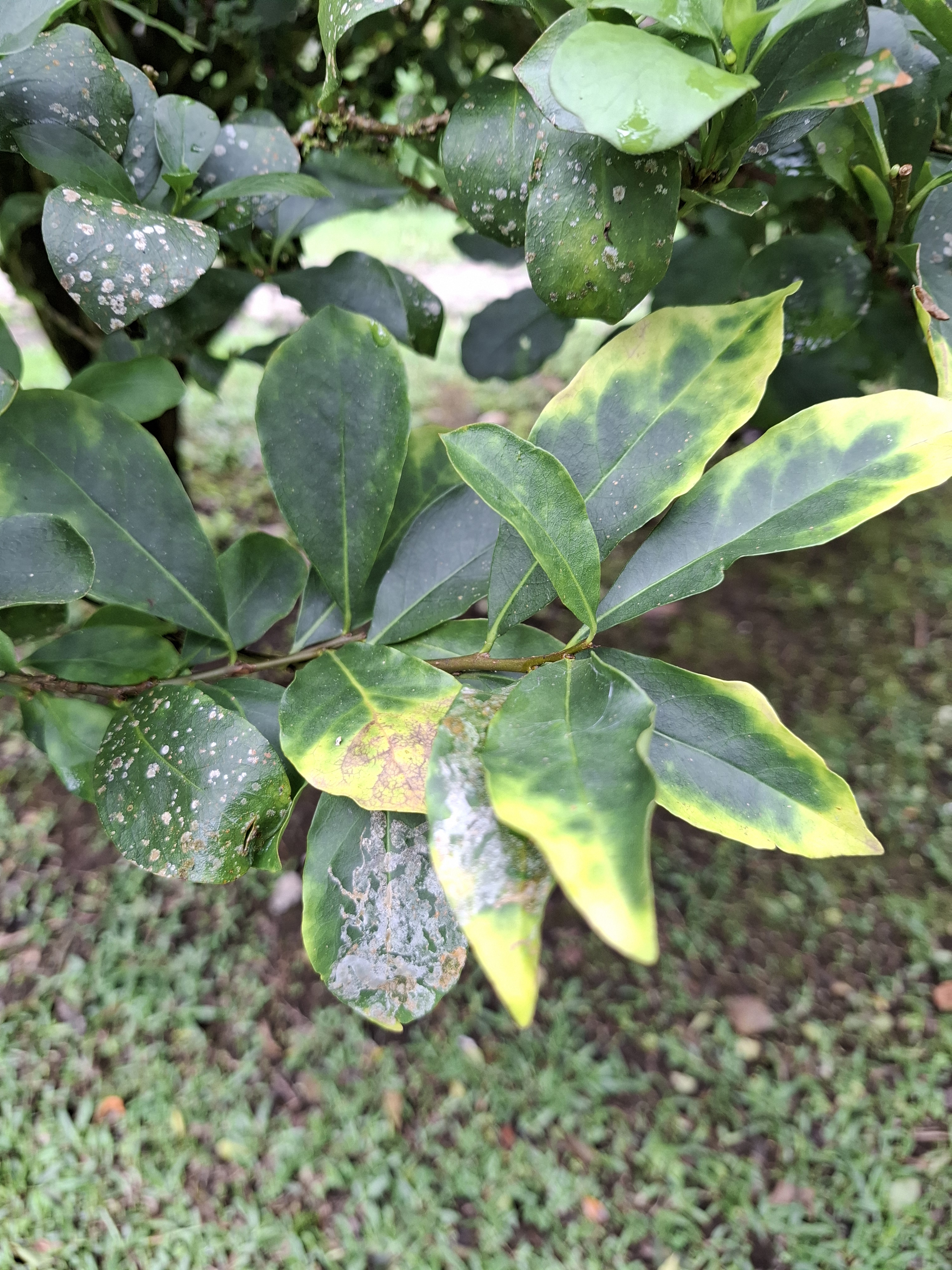
Leaves

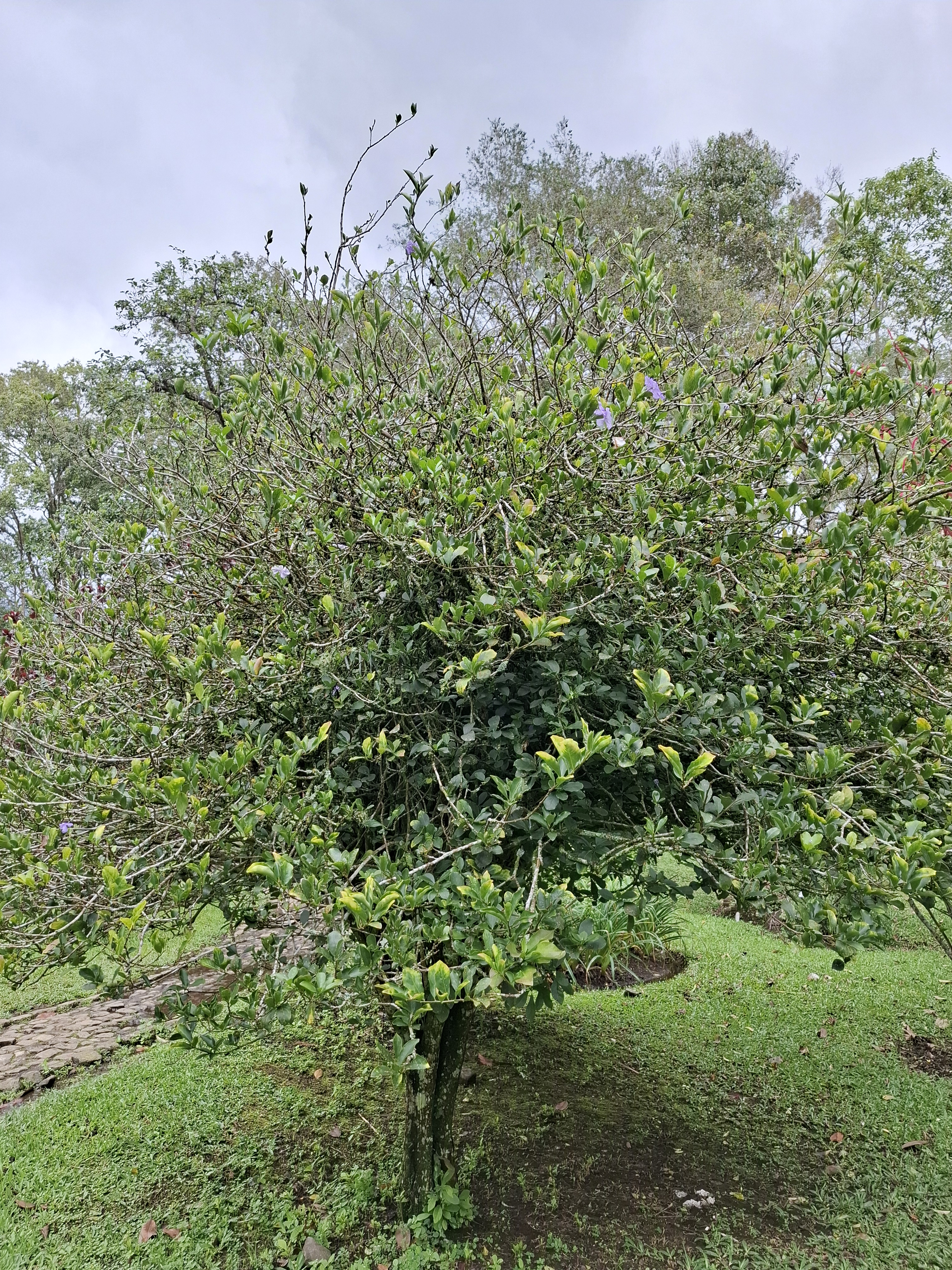
Tree
