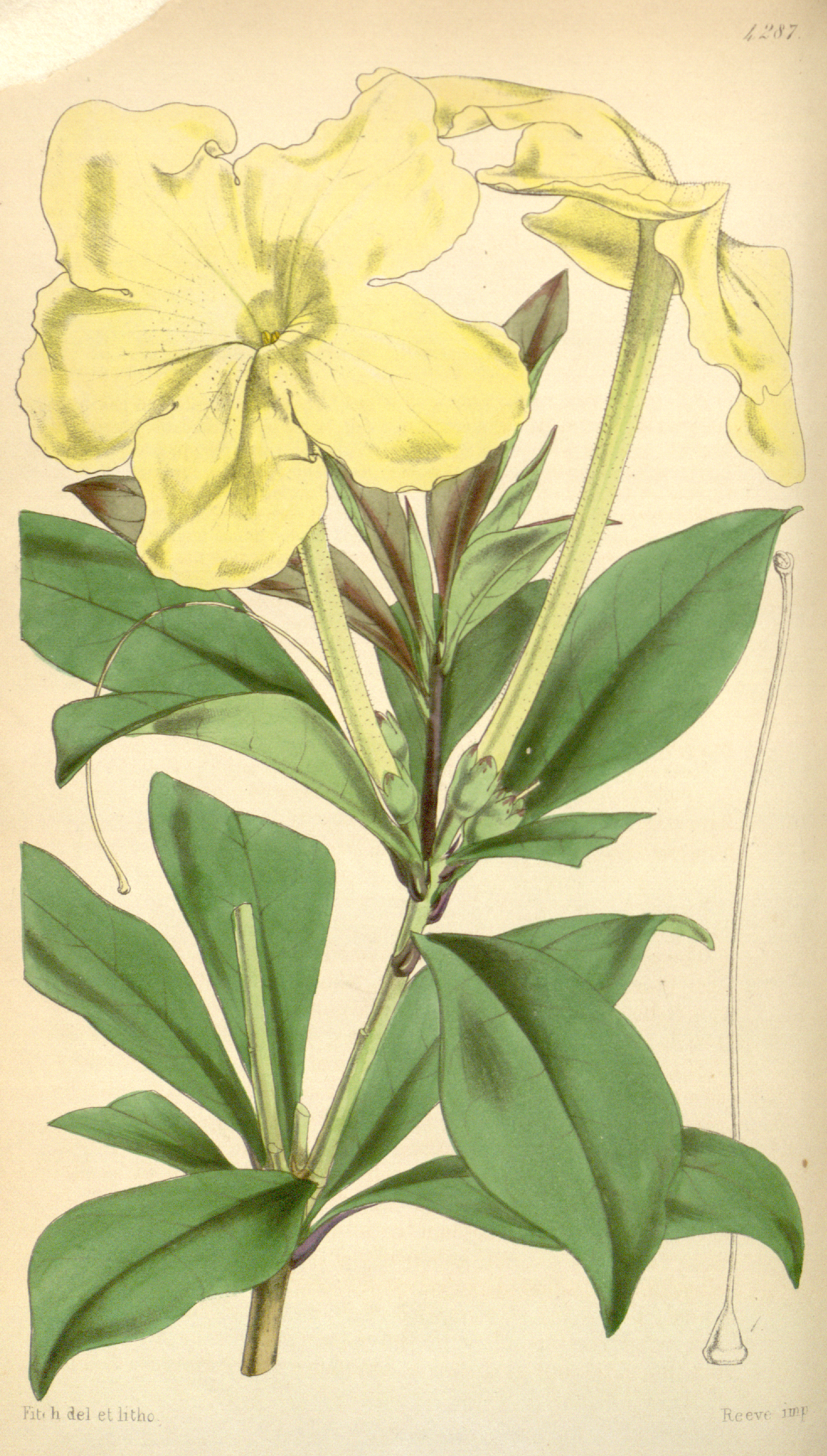

Conservation status
- Vulnerable (IUCN 2.3)

Scientific classification
- Kingdom: Plantae
- Clade: Tracheophytes
- Clade: Angiosperms
- Clade: Eudicots
- Clade: Asterids
- Order: Solanales
- Family: Solanaceae
- Genus: Brunfelsia
- Species: B. jamaicensis

Binomial name
- Brunfelsia jamaicensis (Benth.) Griseb.

= Brunfelsia jamaicensis =

Species of flowering plant

Brunfelsia jamaicensis is a species of flowering plant in the family Solanaceae, the nightshades. It is endemic to Jamaica, where it grows in mountain forests above 1400 meters in elevation.
