= Brunfelsia splendida =

Conservation status
- Vulnerable (IUCN 2.3)

Scientific classification
- Kingdom: Plantae
- Clade: Tracheophytes
- Clade: Angiosperms
- Clade: Eudicots
- Clade: Asterids
- Order: Solanales
- Family: Solanaceae
- Genus: Brunfelsia
- Species: B. splendida

Binomial name
- Brunfelsia splendida Urb.

Species of flowering plant

Brunfelsia splendida is a species of plant in the family Solanaceae. It is endemic to Jamaica.
