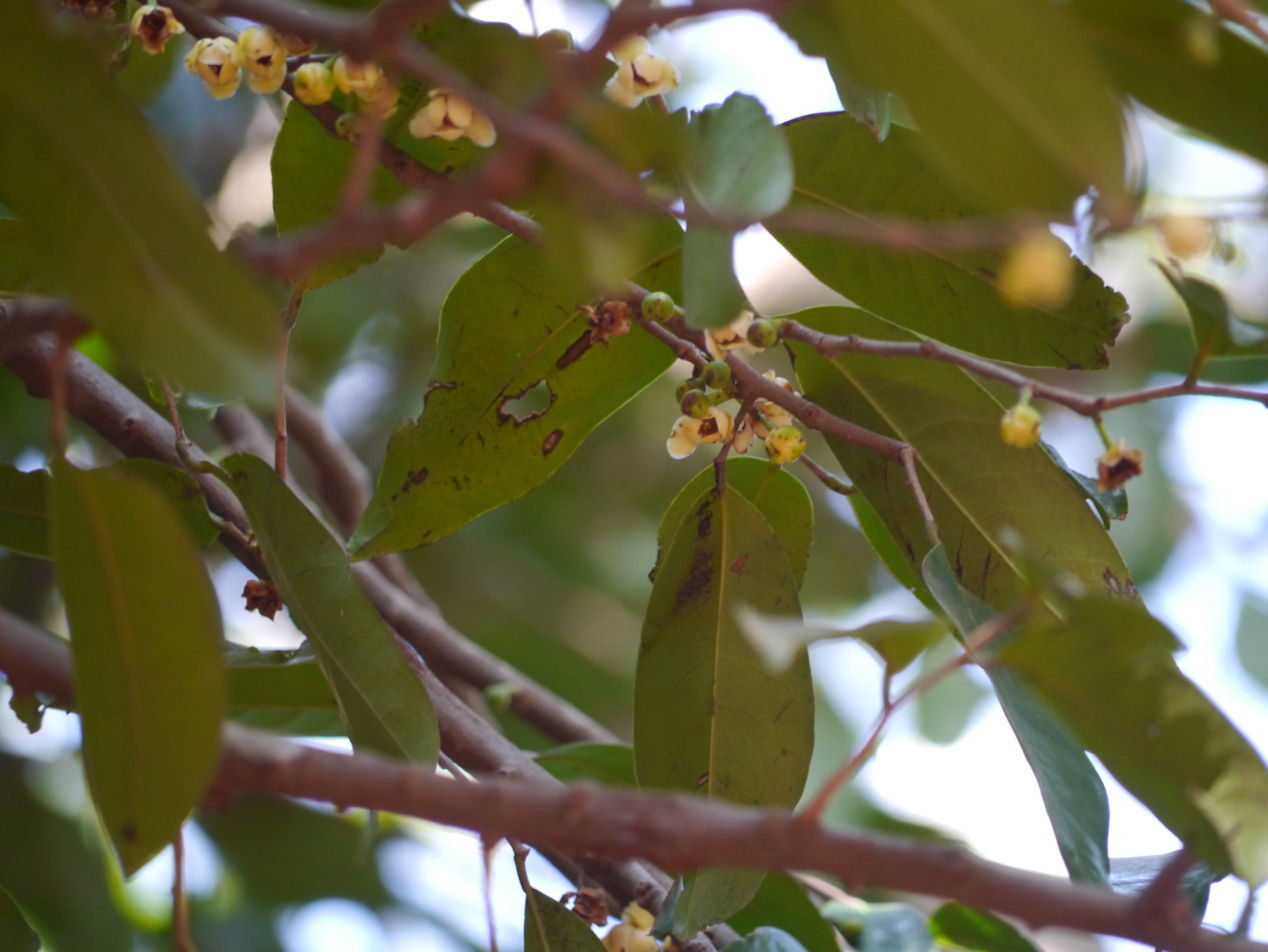
- Sageraea laurina

Scientific classification
- Kingdom: Plantae
- Clade: Tracheophytes
- Clade: Angiosperms
- Clade: Magnoliids
- Order: Magnoliales
- Family: Annonaceae
- Subfamily: Malmeoideae
- Genus: Sageraea; Dalzell

= Sageraea =

Genus of flowering plants

Sageraea is a genus of flowering plants in the family Annonaceae.

Species include:

- Sageraea bracteolata
- Sageraea cauliflora
- Sageraea dalzellii
- Sageraea elliptica (A.DC.) Hook.f. & Thomson
- Sageraea glabra
- Sageraea grandiflora Dunn
- Sageraea hookeri
- Sageraea lanceolata
- Sageraea laurifolia (Grah.) Blatter
- Sageraea laurina
- Sageraea listeri
- Sageraea nitida
- Sageraea reticulata
- Sageraea sarawakensis
- Sageraea thwaitesii Hook.f. & Thomson
- Sageraea zeylanica
