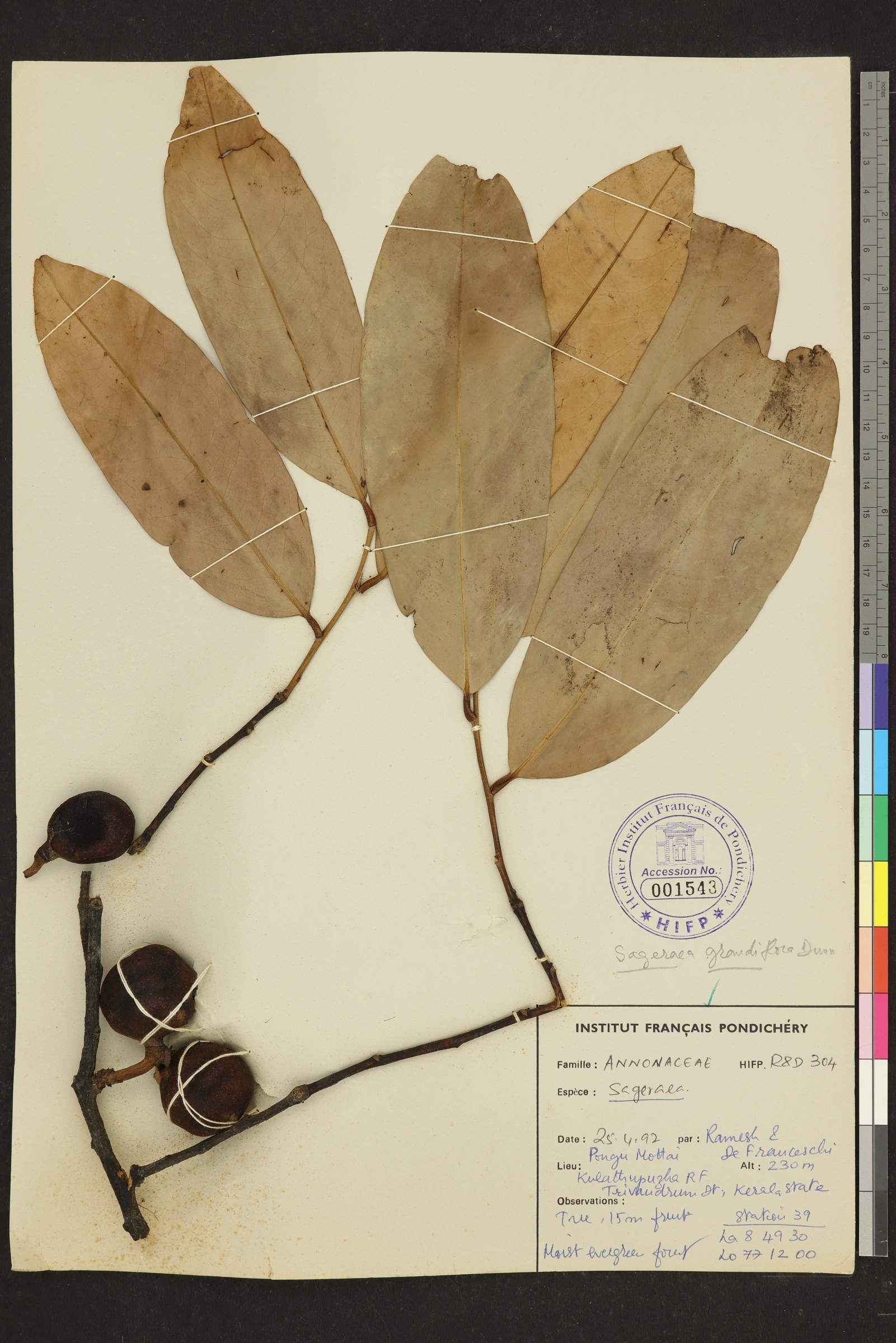

Conservation status
- Endangered (IUCN 2.3)

Scientific classification
- Kingdom: Plantae
- Clade: Tracheophytes
- Clade: Angiosperms
- Clade: Magnoliids
- Order: Magnoliales
- Family: Annonaceae
- Genus: Sageraea
- Species: S. grandiflora

Binomial name
- Sageraea grandiflora Dunn

= Sageraea grandiflora =

Species of flowering plant

Sageraea grandiflora is a species of plant in the Annonaceae family. It is endemic to Kerala, India. It is threatened by habitat loss.
