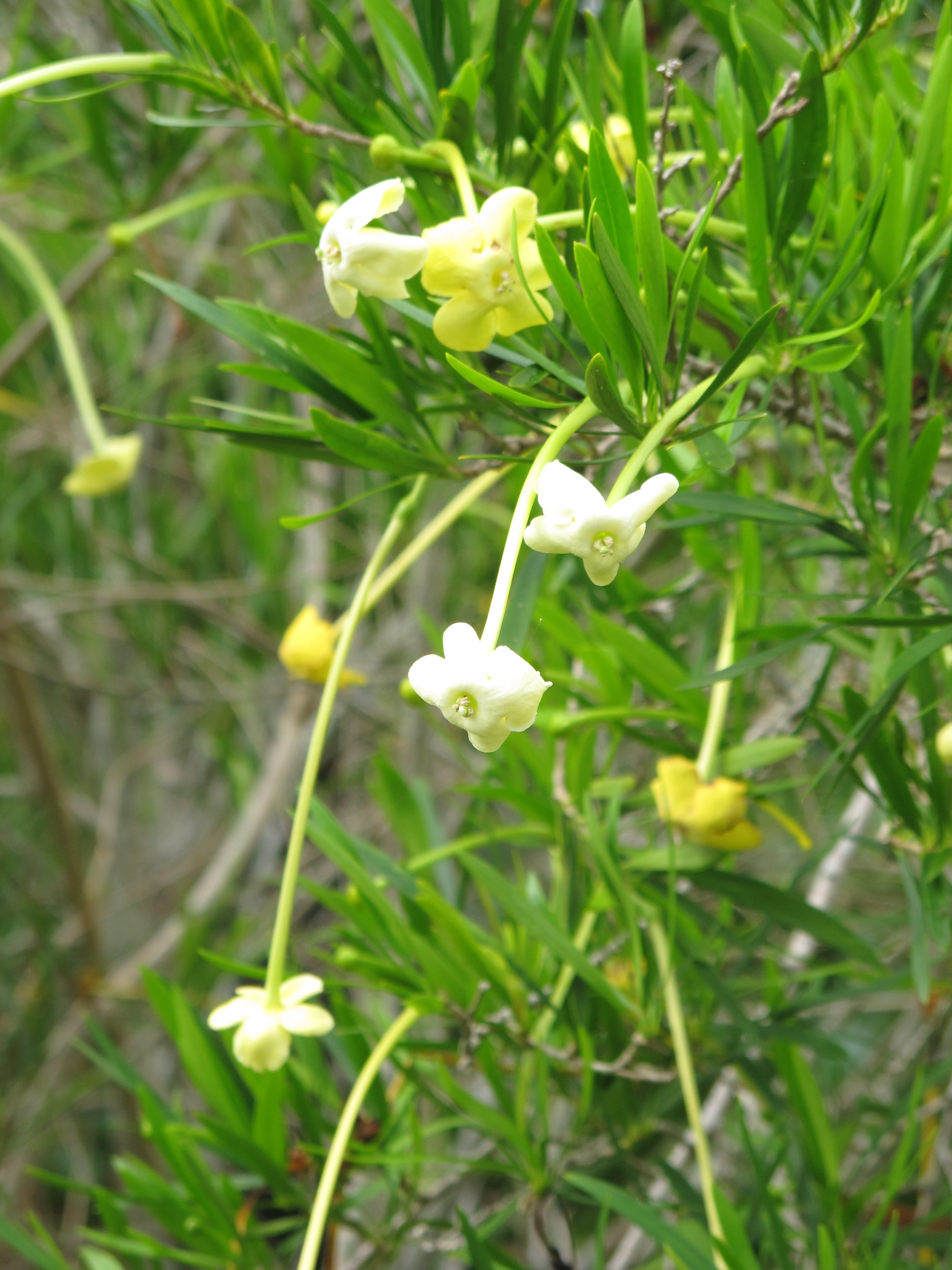

Conservation status
- Critically Imperiled (NatureServe)

Scientific classification
- Kingdom: Plantae
- Clade: Tracheophytes
- Clade: Angiosperms
- Clade: Eudicots
- Clade: Asterids
- Order: Solanales
- Family: Solanaceae
- Genus: Brunfelsia
- Species: B. densifolia

Binomial name
- Brunfelsia densifolia Krug & Urb.

= Brunfelsia densifolia =

Species of flowering plant

Brunfelsia densifolia is a species of flowering plant in the nightshade family known by the common name Serpentine Hill raintree. It is native to Puerto Rico.

This plant is a shrub that grows on serpentine soils containing high amounts of magnesium, nickel, iron, and chromium, and some calcium and nitrogen. It produces long, tubular yellow flowers. It is cultivated as an ornamental plant, but in the wild it is endangered due to habitat loss as land is consumed for agriculture in Puerto Rico.
