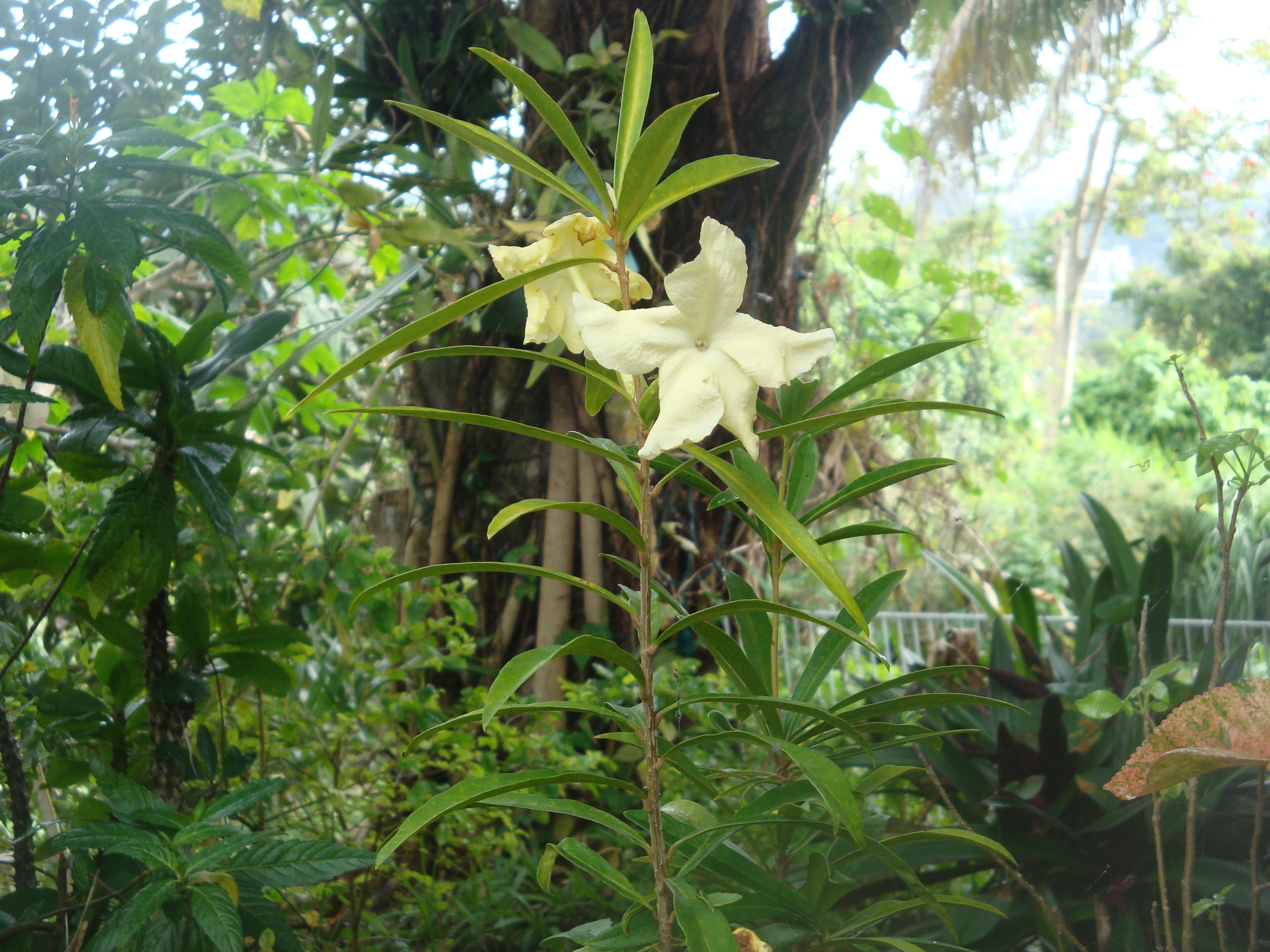

Conservation status
- Endangered (IUCN 3.1)

Scientific classification
- Kingdom: Plantae
- Clade: Tracheophytes
- Clade: Angiosperms
- Clade: Eudicots
- Clade: Asterids
- Order: Solanales
- Family: Solanaceae
- Genus: Brunfelsia
- Species: B. portoricensis

Binomial name
- Brunfelsia portoricensis Krug & Urb. 1897

= Brunfelsia portoricensis =

Species of plant

Brunfelsia portoricensis, the Puerto Rico raintree, is a species of flowering plant in the family Solanaceae. It is endemic to Puerto Rico, where it occurs in El Yunque National Forest. Due to its restricted range, it is classified by the IUCN as an endangered species.

== Description ==
Brunfelsia portoricensis is usually found as an evergreen shrub 3–10 feet high, and more rarely as a small tree up to 15 feet high with a trunk 3 inches in diameter. It is glabrous with densely leafed stout branches. Its leaves are obovate to oblanceolate and abruptly short-pointed at their apex, its white flowers are few or single with 5 large rounded lobes about 2.5 inches across, and its yellow rounded fruits are 1–1.25 inches in diameter. The flowers are umbellate or solitary. It bears flowers in spring and summer; its fruit also matures in the summer, and possesses elliptic brown seeds 3/16 inches long. The species is pollinated by hawk moths.

While it is colloquially called the "Puerto Rico raintree" in English, the species lacks a Spanish common name.

== Conservation ==
Brunfelsia portoricensis is only found in the Luquillo Mountains of eastern Puerto Rico where it can be found in the lower El Yunque National Forest at elevations from 1,500 to 1,800 feet.

In 1998, there were thought to be about 300 individuals of the species remaining, occurring in at least 15 to 20 sites. Habitat is being lost to the establishment of tree plantations.

Due to these threats, the IUCN listed the species as vulnerable until 1998, when it was re-assessed as being endangered.
