= Timothy Plowman =

American ethnobotanist

- Born: November 17, 1944
- Died: January 7, 1989 (aged 44)
- Citizenship: United States
- Education: Cornell University, Harvard University
- Known for: · intensive systematic study of coca
- Scientific career
- Fields: Ethnobotany
- Workplaces: Field Museum of Natural History
- Doctoral advisor: Richard Evans Schultes
- Author abbrev. (botany): Plowman

Timothy Charles Plowman (November 17, 1944 – January 7, 1989) was an American ethnobotanist best known for his intensive work over the course of 15 years on the genus Erythroxylum in general, and the cultivated coca species in particular. He collected more than 700 specimens from South America, housed in the collection of the Field Museum of Natural History. The standard author abbreviation Plowman is used to indicate this person as the author when citing a botanical name.

== Career ==
Plowman joined the Field Museum of Natural History in 1978 where he became tenured in 1983 and was appointed Curator in 1988. He published more than 80 scientific papers (46 on Erythroxylum) and served as editor for several scientific journals.

He is one of the main subjects of One River: Explorations and Discoveries in the Amazon Rain Forest by Wade Davis. Both were students of Richard Evans Schultes, the father of modern ethnobotany.

Plowman died of AIDS, which he contracted from pre-trip inoculations.

== Legacy ==
The nightshade species Brunfelsia plowmaniana is named after him, as also is the monotypic genus Plowmania. The single species, Plowmania nyctaginoides (Standl.) Hunz. & Subils is closely related to Brunfelsia, but differs from it most notably in the large and brilliant orange-red flowers (reminiscent of those of the better-known ornamental Ipomoea coccinea) that have earned it well-deserved place in U.S. horticulture. Also in 2004, botanists Faden & C.R.Hardy published Plowmanianthus, a genus of plants with 5 species and 2 subspecies in the family Commelinaceae (the spiderwort and dayflower family). In 2008, Thomas Croat named a species of Anthurium in honor of Plowman, A. timplowmanii.
