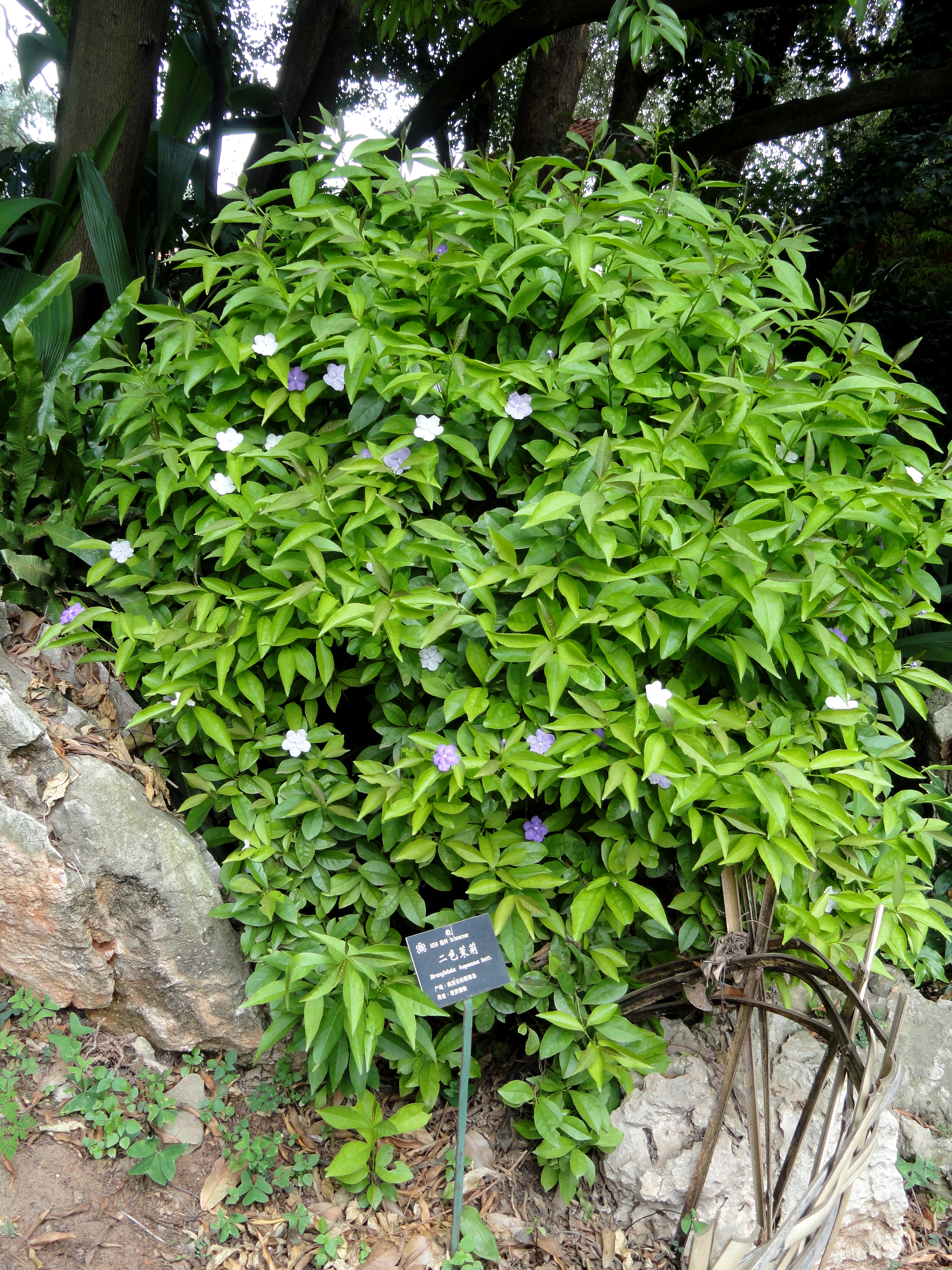
- Habit

Scientific classification
- Kingdom: Plantae
- Clade: Tracheophytes
- Clade: Angiosperms
- Clade: Eudicots
- Clade: Asterids
- Order: Solanales
- Family: Solanaceae
- Genus: Brunfelsia
- Species: B. uniflora

Binomial name
- Brunfelsia uniflora (Pohl) D.Don

Synonyms
- List: Brunfelsia hopeana (Hook.) Benth.; Brunfelsia hopeana var. pubescens Benth.; Brunfelsia mutabilis (H.Jacq.) Vilm.; Brunfelsia uniflora var. pubescens (Benth.) R.E.D.Baker; Brunfelsia uniflora f. typica Hassl.; Franciscea hopeana Hook.; Franciscea mutabilis H.Jacq.; Franciscea uniflora Pohl; Martia opifera Lacerda ex J.A.Schmidt

= Brunfelsia uniflora =

Species of plant in the nightshade family

Brunfelsia uniflora (syn. Brunfelsia hopeana), the manac, is a species of flowering plant in the family Solanaceae. It is native to Monos island of Trinidad and Tobago, Venezuela, the Venezuelan Antilles, Guyana, Brazil, and northwest Argentina, and has been introduced to eastern Tropical Africa, Réunion, Mauritius, India, and Assam. A poisonous evergreen shrub typically 0.5 to 3 m (2 to 10 ft) tall, it is commonly cultivated as an ornamental, and as an ingredient in ayahuasca and other potions, usually under its synonym Brunfelsia hopeana.
