= Brunfelsamidine =

Names
- Preferred IUPAC name 1H-Pyrrole-3-carboximidamide

Identifiers
CAS Number	97744-98-4
3D model (JSmol)	Interactive image
ChemSpider	15942384
PubChem CID	176662
UNII	FT2DW4V2WG
CompTox Dashboard (EPA)	DTXSID70913673
- InChI: InChI=1S/C5H7N3/c6-5(7)4-1-2-8-3-4/h1-3,8H,(H3,6,7) Key: XVEVWOAHSYZRQE-UHFFFAOYSA-N
- SMILES: C1=CNC=C1C(=N)N

Properties
Chemical formula	C_{5}H_{7}N_{3}
Molar mass	109.132 g·mol^{−1}
- Except where otherwise noted, data are given for materials in their standard state (at 25 °C [77 °F], 100 kPa). Infobox references

Brunfelsamidine is a poisonous pyrrolidine occurring in several species belonging to the Solanaceous (nightshade family) genus Brunfelsia, which has convulsant and neurotoxic effects. It is a fairly common cause of poisoning among domestic animals such as cows and dogs that eat the plant. Symptoms are similar to poisoning from strychnine and can last from a few hours up to several days. It is also a weak tryptase (type of serine protease) inhibitor and found in Leptonychia pubescens
