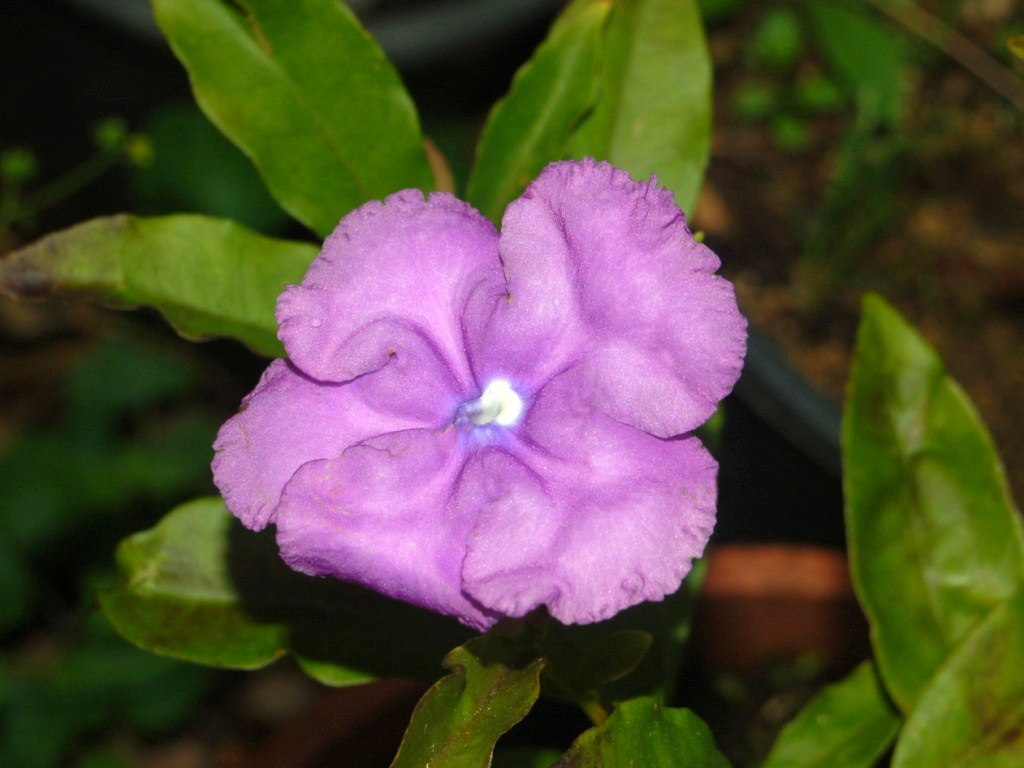

Scientific classification
- Kingdom: Plantae
- Clade: Tracheophytes
- Clade: Angiosperms
- Clade: Eudicots
- Clade: Asterids
- Order: Solanales
- Family: Solanaceae
- Genus: Brunfelsia
- Species: B. grandiflora

Binomial name
- Brunfelsia grandiflora D.Don

= Brunfelsia grandiflora =

Species of plant

Brunfelsia grandiflora is a flowering shrub in the nightshade family. It is native to South America. In English is known by the common names royal purple brunfelsia, kiss-me-quick, and yesterday-today-and-tomorrow. In Peru it is known by the Spanish-Quechua name chiricsanango.

This shrub grows up to 10 feet tall by 8 feet wide. It has a dense foliage of alternately arranged leaves each up to 12 inches long. The fragrant flowers are white or shades of purple. They bloom nearly year-round.

In its native range it is used in traditional medicine to treat fever, rheumatism, syphilis, and arthritis. It is sometimes used as one of the active plant additives contributing to the hallucinogenic effects of the South American drink ayahuasca. In laboratory tests, extracts of the plant were active against the protozoa that cause leishmaniasis, especially Leishmania major.

Brunfelsia grandiflora is sometimes cultivated as an ornamental plant, such as for landscape design.
