= Grandiflora =

Grandiflora may refer to:

- Grandiflora (rose), a rose cultivar group
- Grandiflora, a cultivar of Passiflora caerulea, the blue passion flower
