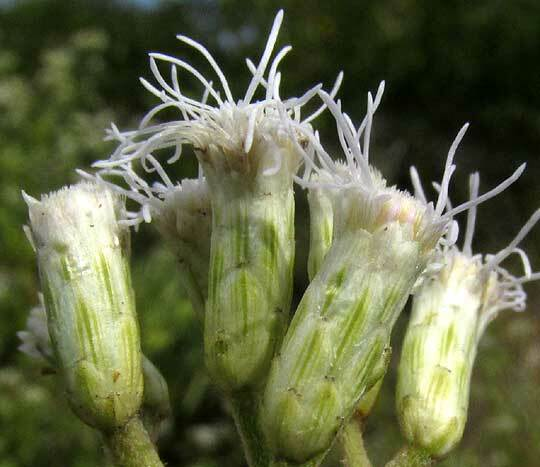
- Chromolaena lundellii flowers

Scientific classification
- Kingdom: Plantae
- Clade: Tracheophytes
- Clade: Angiosperms
- Clade: Eudicots
- Clade: Asterids
- Order: Asterales
- Family: Asteraceae
- Tribe: Eupatorieae
- Subtribe: Praxelinae; R.M.King & H.Rob.

Genera
- Chromolaena DC. • 163 spp.; Eitenia R.M.King & H.Rob. • 2 spp.; Eupatoriopsis Hieron • 1 spp.; Guayania R.M.King & H.Rob. • 5 spp.; Lomatozona Baker • 4 spp.; Osmiopsis R.M.King & H.Rob. • 1 spp.; Praxeliopsis G.M. Barroso • 1 spp.; Praxelis Cass. • 20 spp.

= Praxelinae =

Subtribe of plant

The Praxelinae are a subtribe of the tribe Eupatorieae of the family Asteraceae.

== Description ==
Species belonging to the subtribe Praxelinae are erect to somewhat sprawling plants that can be either annuals or perennials, herbaceous or subshrubs, and sparsely to densely branched. They never form rosettes when young.

Leaves usually arise opposite one another on short to moderately long petioles. Leaf margins can be toothed to toothless, and the blades are not subdivided into leaflets though sometimes taxa in Lomatozona are deeply cut. Leaf shapes range from egg-shaped or oblong, to very slender.

In the inflorescences, individual flower heads, or capitula, usually comprise 5-65 florets, whose corollas may be white, blue, lavender or purple.

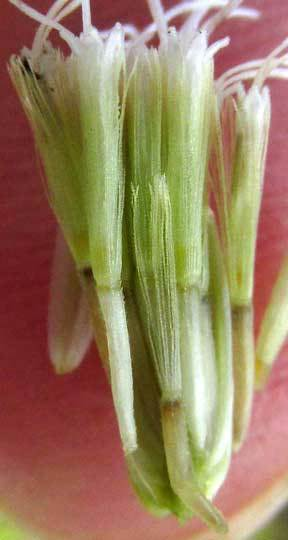
Chromolaena lundellii, dissected flowering head showing florets

The main visual feature separating genera of the Praxelinae from genera in other subtribes of the Eupatorieae is that on dried and preserved herbarium specimens, the individual flower heads' involucral bracts are totally deciduous -- they fall off. On living plants the bracts remain hugging the heads' columnar involucre, rather than spreading at maturity, as with members of most other subtribes of the Eupatorieae. Of course this means that in the field this feature doesn't make a good field mark for recognizing species of Praxeliae.

Other features characteristic of Praxelinae species, but sometimes shared with species in other subtribes, include: the flower head's receptacle is flat to convex, not conic or columnar; the flowering head's peduncle is not noticeably enlarged just below the head; involucral bracts of similar lengths are arranged in more than two or three spiraling series, and; corolla lobes may bear glands.

== Distribution ==
The center of diversity for Praxelinae genera is Brazil. Only two of the subtribe's genera are found outside the country: Certain species of Chromolaena extend north beyond South America and the genus Osmiella is endemic just to Hispaniola.

== Taxonomy ==
The subtribe Praxelinae was first published in 1980, in the journal Phylogia.

In 2025, a preprint was available online providing evidence based on genetic studies -- Bayesian analysis of ITS -- suggesting that the genus Osmiopsis is a hybrid between the genus Chromolaena (subtribe Praxelinae) and the genus Koanophyllon (subtribe Critoniinae). If this is the case, it the first report of possible inter-subtribal hybridization in the family Asteraceae. Since both taxa occur in the Mexico and Caribbean area, this may support the idea that hybridization has played a significant role in the diversification of the Caribbean flora, as has been shown in species-rich genera from other archipelagos. Taxonomically, it raises the question if sister subtribes Praxelinae and Critoniinae should be united.

== Gallery ==
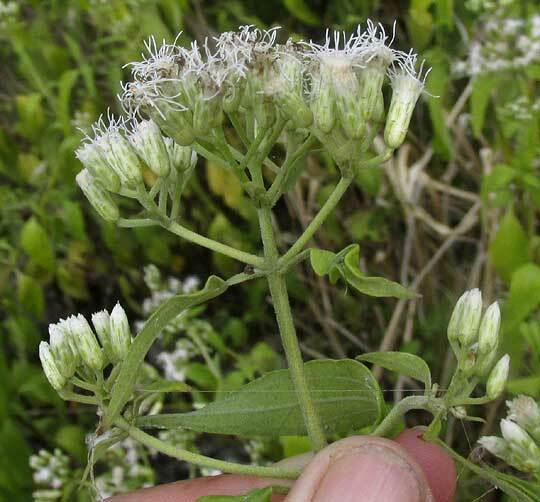
Chromolaena lundellii inflorescence

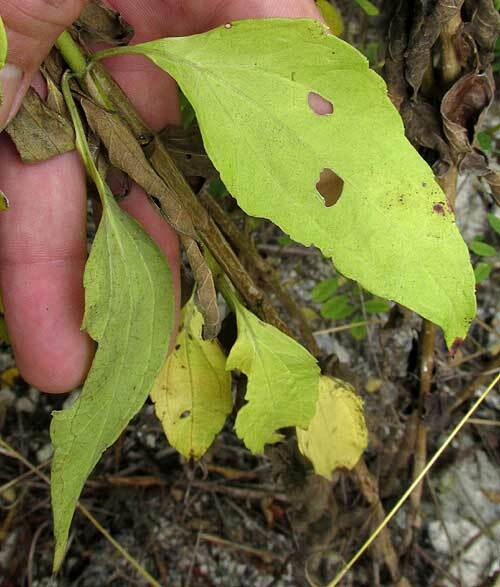
Chromolaena lundellii leaves

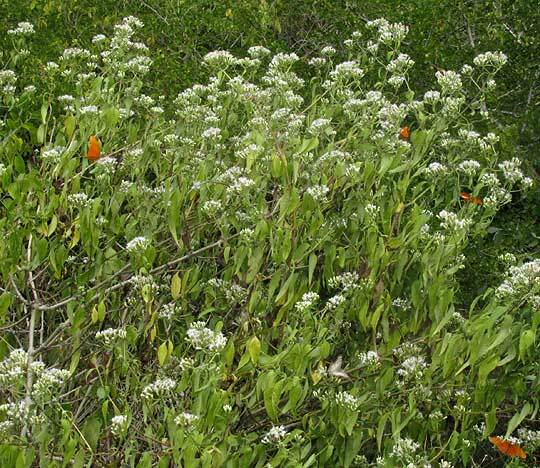
Chromolaena lundellii attracting butterflies
