= Kearfott =

Kearfott may refer to:

== People ==
- Kimberlee Kearfott, American nuclear physicist
- William D. Kearfott (1864-1917), American engineer and entomologist

== Other uses ==
- Kearfott Guidance & Navigation, American defense manufacturer
- Kearfott-Bane House, historic house in West Virginia
- Acrobasis kearfottella, also known as Kearfott's acrobasis moth
- Cochylis maiana, also known as Kearfott's rolandylis moth
