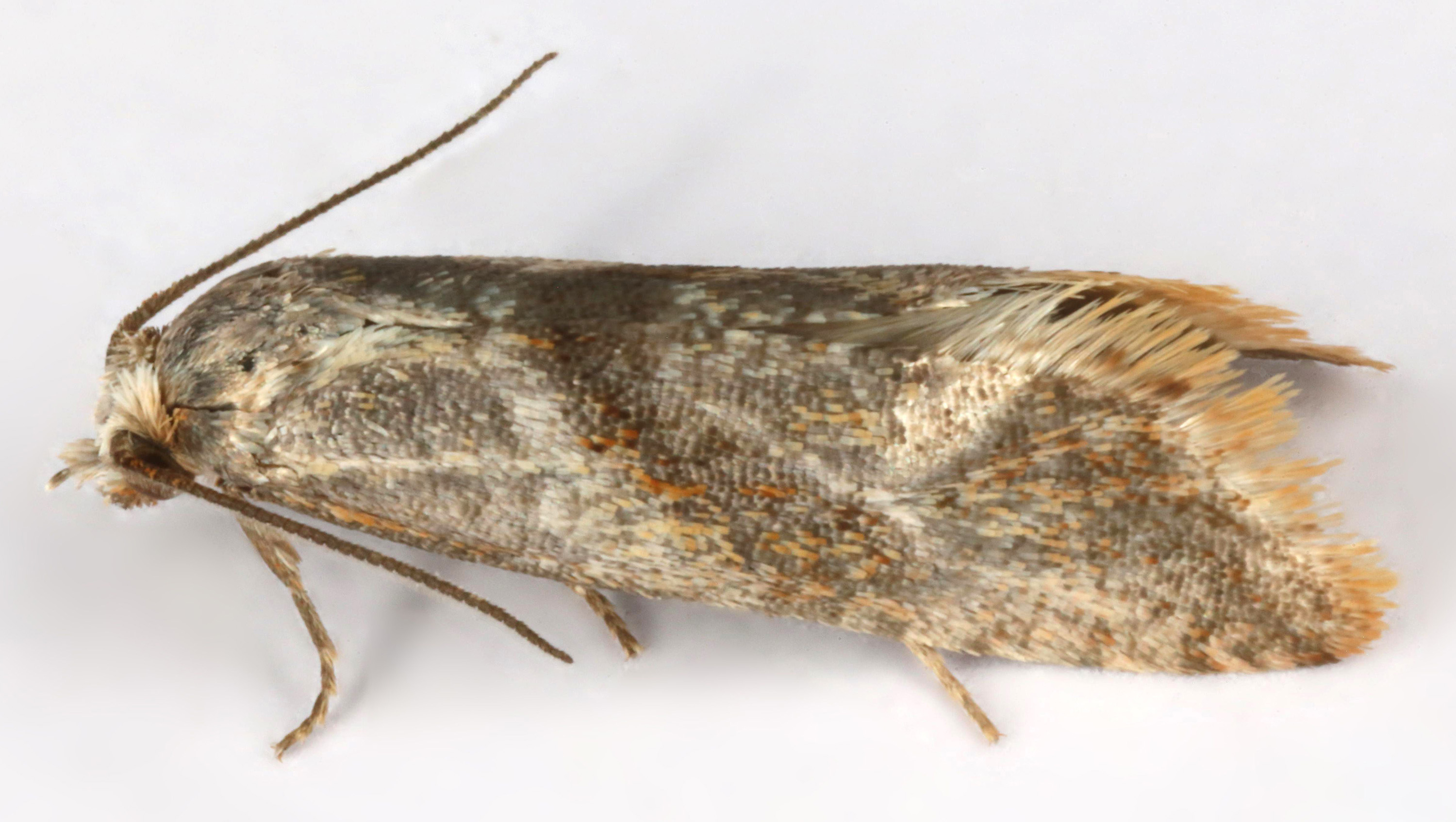
- Falseuncaria ruficiliana, Minera, North Wales

Scientific classification
- Kingdom: Animalia
- Phylum: Arthropoda
- Clade: Pancrustacea
- Class: Insecta
- Order: Lepidoptera
- Family: Tortricidae
- Genus: Falseuncaria
- Species: F. ruficiliana

Binomial name
- Falseuncaria ruficiliana (Haworth, [1811])

Synonyms
- Tortrix ruficiliana Haworth, [1811]; Tinea ciliella Hubner, 1796; Conchylis coniana Fuchs, 1903; Eupoecilia ruficiliella Wood, 1839; Conchylis tectana Fuchs, 1903

= Falseuncaria ruficiliana =

Red-fringed conch

Species of moth

Falseuncaria ruficiliana, the red-fringed conch, is a species of moth of the family Tortricidae. It is found in China (Xinjiang) and most of Europe. The habitat consists of limestone, heathland and moorland.

The wingspan is 13–15 mm. It resembles the related species Falseuncaria degreyana, but in this species the forewing's brown cross-band is clearly wider and more marked. The forewings are narrow and evenly-wide, warm reddish-brown, in the middle with a wide, slanted, dark brown cross-band, which usually reaches the front edge. The band is narrowly edged with white on both sides. The outer edge of the wing is slightly darker than the rest. The hindwings are grey-brown and relatively narrow.

There are two generations per year, with adults on wing in May and again from July to August.

The larvae feed on the seeds of Primula veris, Primula farinosa, Linaria vulgaris, Inula officinalis, Aster linosyris, Bellis perennis, Gentiana verna and Antirrhinum species, living within the seed capsules. The species overwinters as a cocoon.
