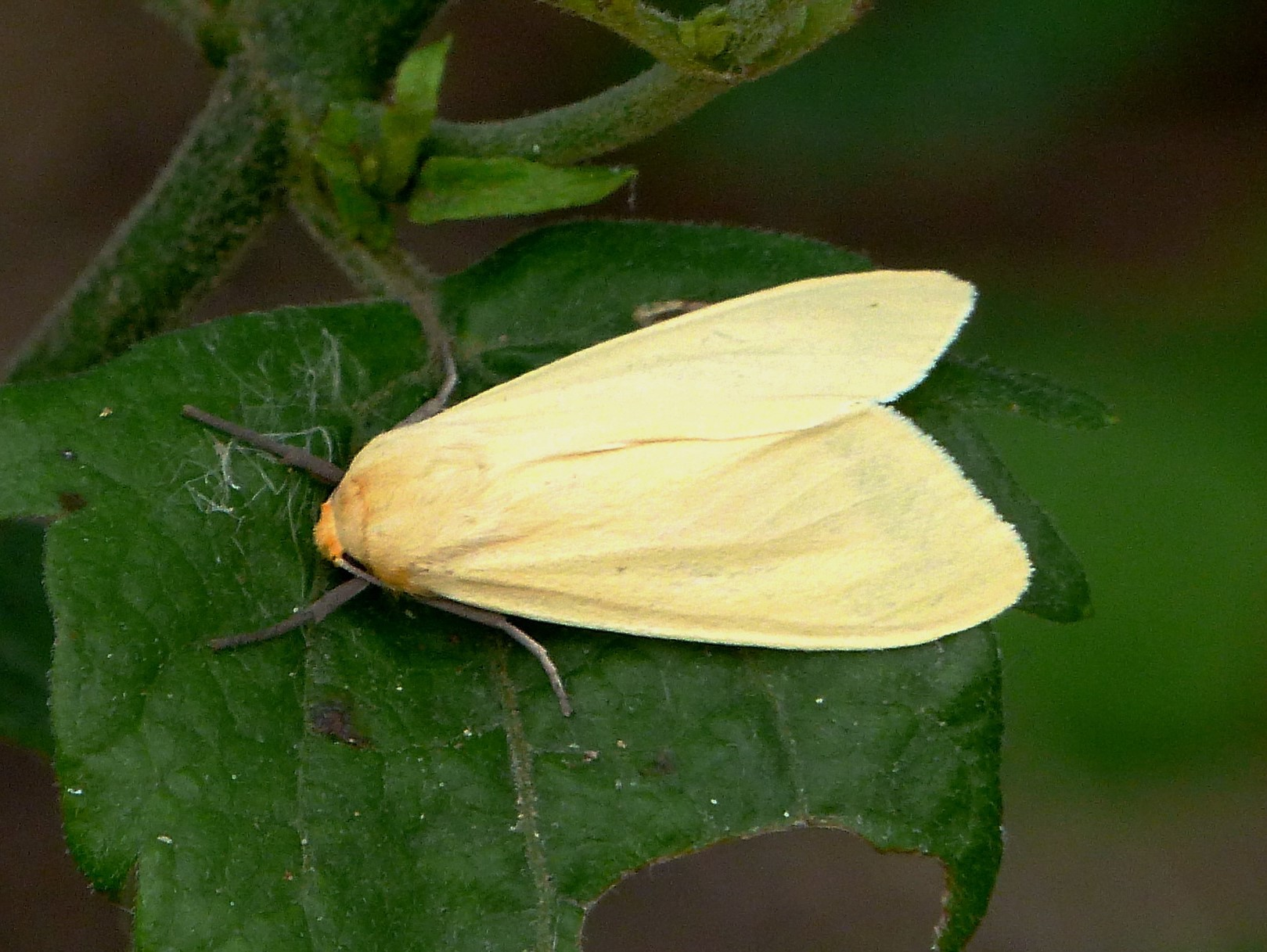

Scientific classification
- Kingdom: Animalia
- Phylum: Arthropoda
- Clade: Pancrustacea
- Class: Insecta
- Order: Lepidoptera
- Superfamily: Noctuoidea
- Family: Erebidae
- Subfamily: Arctiinae
- Genus: Pareuchaetes
- Species: P. insulata

Binomial name
- Pareuchaetes insulata (Walker, 1855)

Synonyms
- Halysidota insulata Walker, 1855; Pareuchaetes affinis Grote, [1866]; Pareuchaetes cadaverosa Grote, [1866]

= Pareuchaetes insulata =

Species of moth

Pareuchaetes insulata, also known as the yellow-winged pareuchaetes, is a moth of the subfamily Arctiinae. It was described by Francis Walker in 1855. It is found throughout the Caribbean, as well as in the southern United States (Arizona, Florida, South Carolina and Texas), Mexico and down through Central America into Colombia and Venezuela.

== Description ==
The wingspan is 26–38 mm. Adults have been recorded on wing year round, but are most common from April to November.

== Ecology ==
The larvae feed on various plants, including Chromolaena odorata, Ageratum species and Hernandia sonora.
