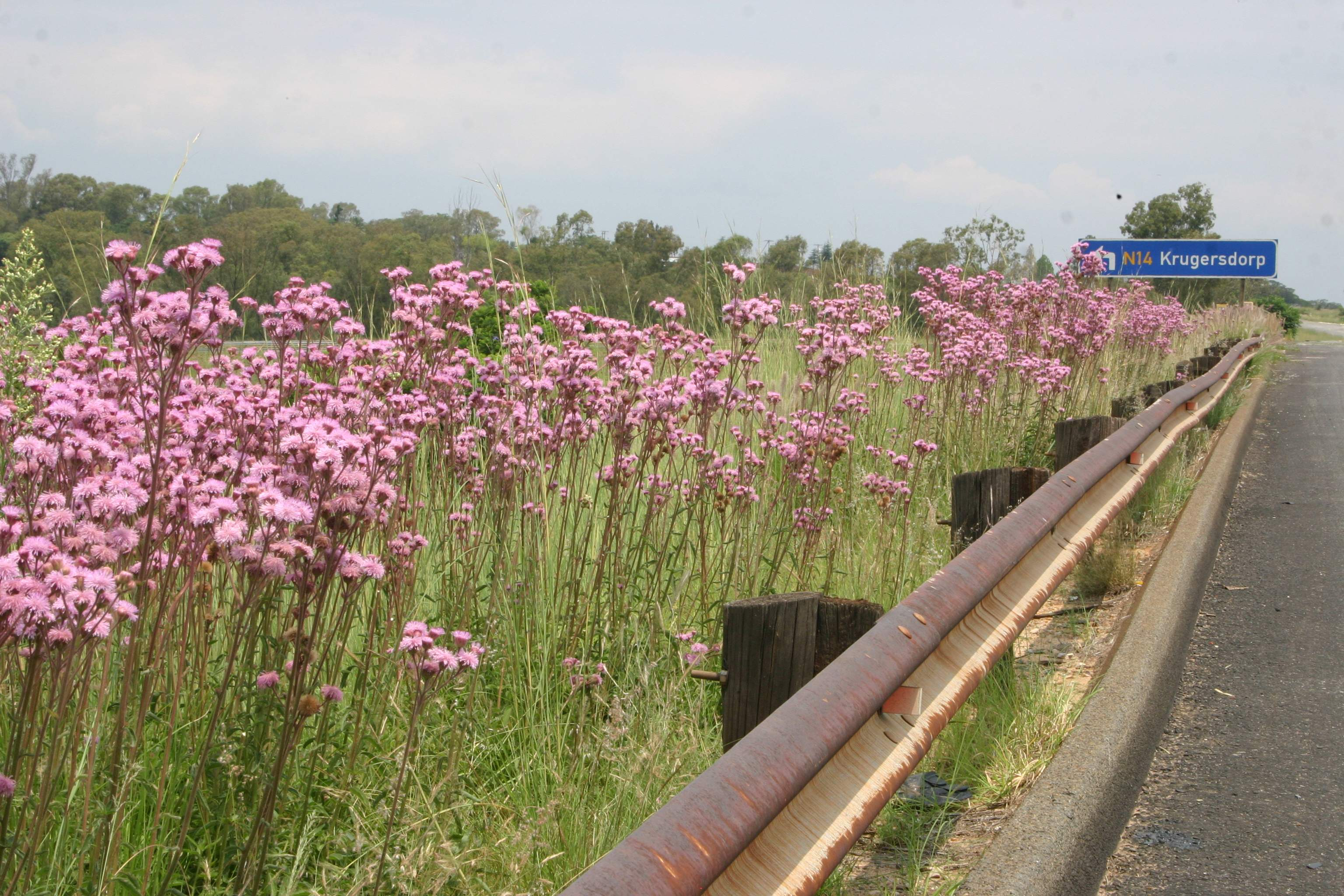

Scientific classification
- Kingdom: Plantae
- Clade: Embryophytes
- Clade: Tracheophytes
- Clade: Spermatophytes
- Clade: Angiosperms
- Clade: Eudicots
- Clade: Asterids
- Order: Asterales
- Family: Asteraceae
- Genus: Eupatorium
- Species: E. macrocephalum

Binomial name
- Eupatorium macrocephalum Less.

= Eupatorium macrocephalum =

Species of flowering plant

Eupatorium macrocephalum Less. a.k.a. pompom weed, is a cosmopolitan perennial plant belonging to the family of Asteraceae and regarded as an invasive weed in some countries. It is native to the southern United States, Central America, South America and was introduced to South Africa. It is classed as a principal weed in Brazil. In South Africa it has been cultivated as an ornamental, is often found on roadsides, and has become of concern for its invading of undisturbed climax grassland and wetlands since the 1960s. It is closely related to Siam weed, and is one of some 268 species in the genus.

This species is rhizomatous with erect stems to 1.3 m tall, and has stem and leaves covered in rough, bristly hairs. It forms dense rosettes of leaves at ground level, suppressing the germination and growth of other species, at the same time producing allelochemicals which adversely affect the growth of neighbouring plants. The plant dies back annually to its root crown, and survives veldfires over the winter period. Its leaves are light green in colour, lanceolate-elliptic in shape, and measure 8 cm × 2 cm. Leaf margins are serrate, the teeth becoming smaller away from the stalk. Flower heads are surrounded by lanceolate, purplish bracts some 8 mm in length. Flowers are large, pink and showy, and exceed the bracts by 6–8 mm. Mature achenes are black and 5 mm long with a pappus of simple bristles.

Moths of the genus Adaina and in particular Adaina microdactyla (Hübner), have been investigated as possible biological control agents. Species in the genus include flower borers, leaf feeders and also species that induce stem galls which provide food and accommodation for larvae and pupae. Research at Cedara College of Agriculture has found a rust fungus, Puccinia eupatorii, which invades the seeds and kills the whole plant, including the roots. This rust fungus is specific to E. macrocephalum and would therefore be ideal as a biological control. Other potential insect agents include a stem-galling thrips, Liothrips sp., and the moth Cochylis campuloclinium.

Material from this species has been analysed, resulting in the identification of six triterpenes, one diterpene glycoside ester, six steroids, one flavonoid known as cirsilol, and six cinnamic acids derivatives.

The name Eupatorium macrocephalum was first published in January 1830 by Christian Friedrich Lessing in Linnaea 5(1): 136–137. 1830. "Eupatorium" was first used by Linnaeus to honour 'Eupator Dionysius' a.k.a. Mithridates, an ancient ruler of Anatolia, while 'macrocephalum' means 'large-headed' and refers to the inflorescence.

== Synonyms ==
- Campuloclinium macrocephalum var. strigosum DC.
- Chromolaena pratensis Gardner
- Eupatorium albertinae Ant.Molina
- Eupatorium denudatum Chodat
- Eupatorium donianum Hook. & Arn.
- Eupatorium macrocephalum var. angustifolium Baker
- Eupatorium macrocephalum var. stigmatosum (Chodat) Hassl.
- Eupatorium macrocephalum var. strigosum (DC.) Baker
- Eupatorium stigmatosum Chodat [Illegitimate]
- Eupatorium stigmatosum var. subcalvatum Chodat
- Eupatorium stigmatosum var. violaceum Chodat
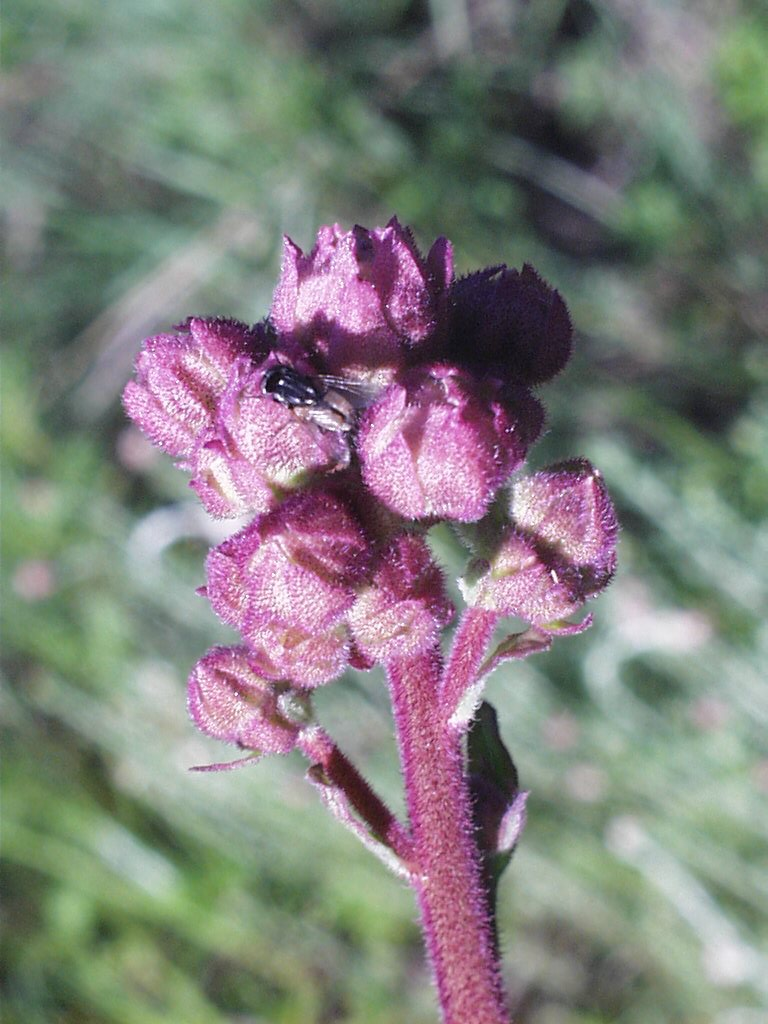
Flower buds

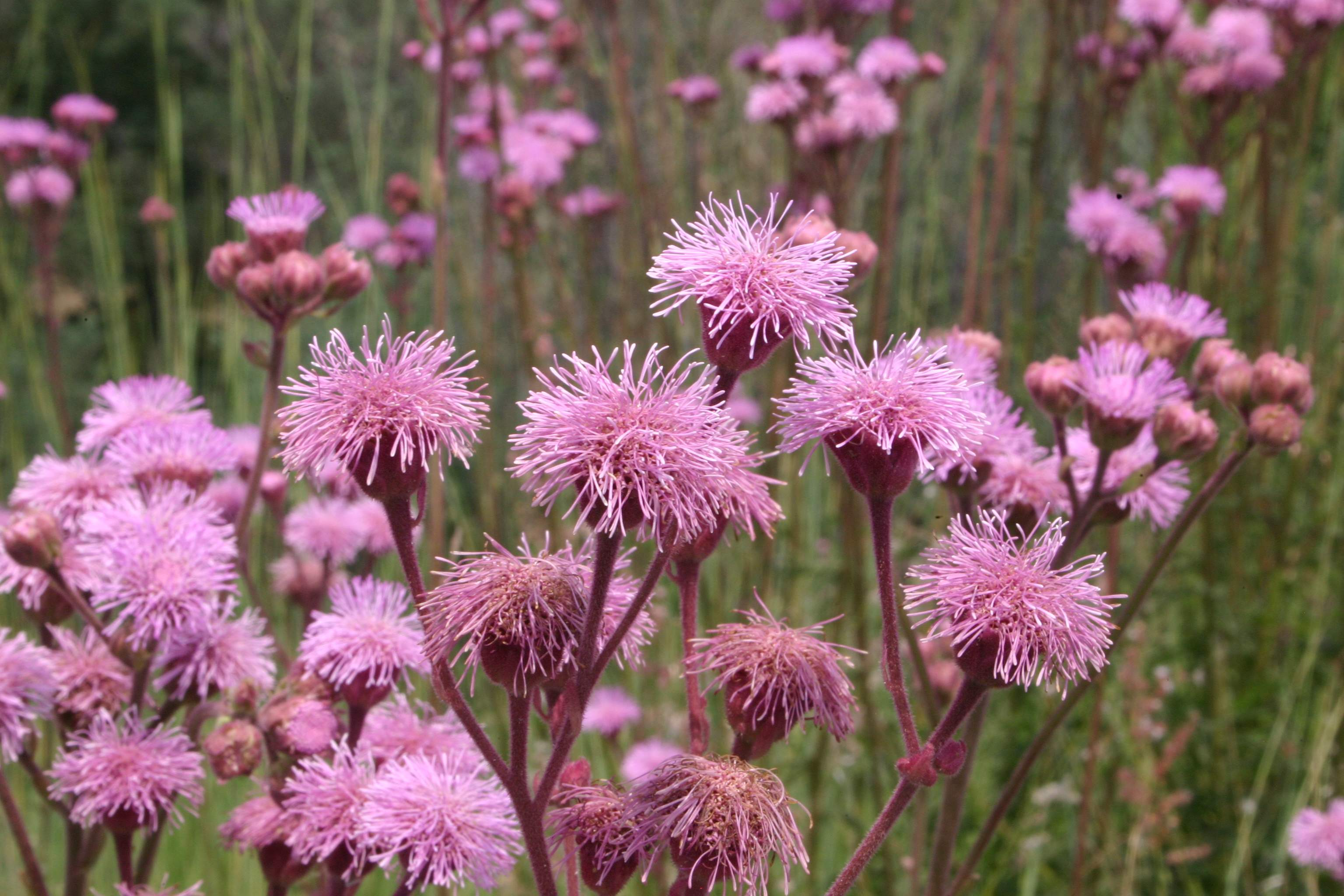
Flower heads

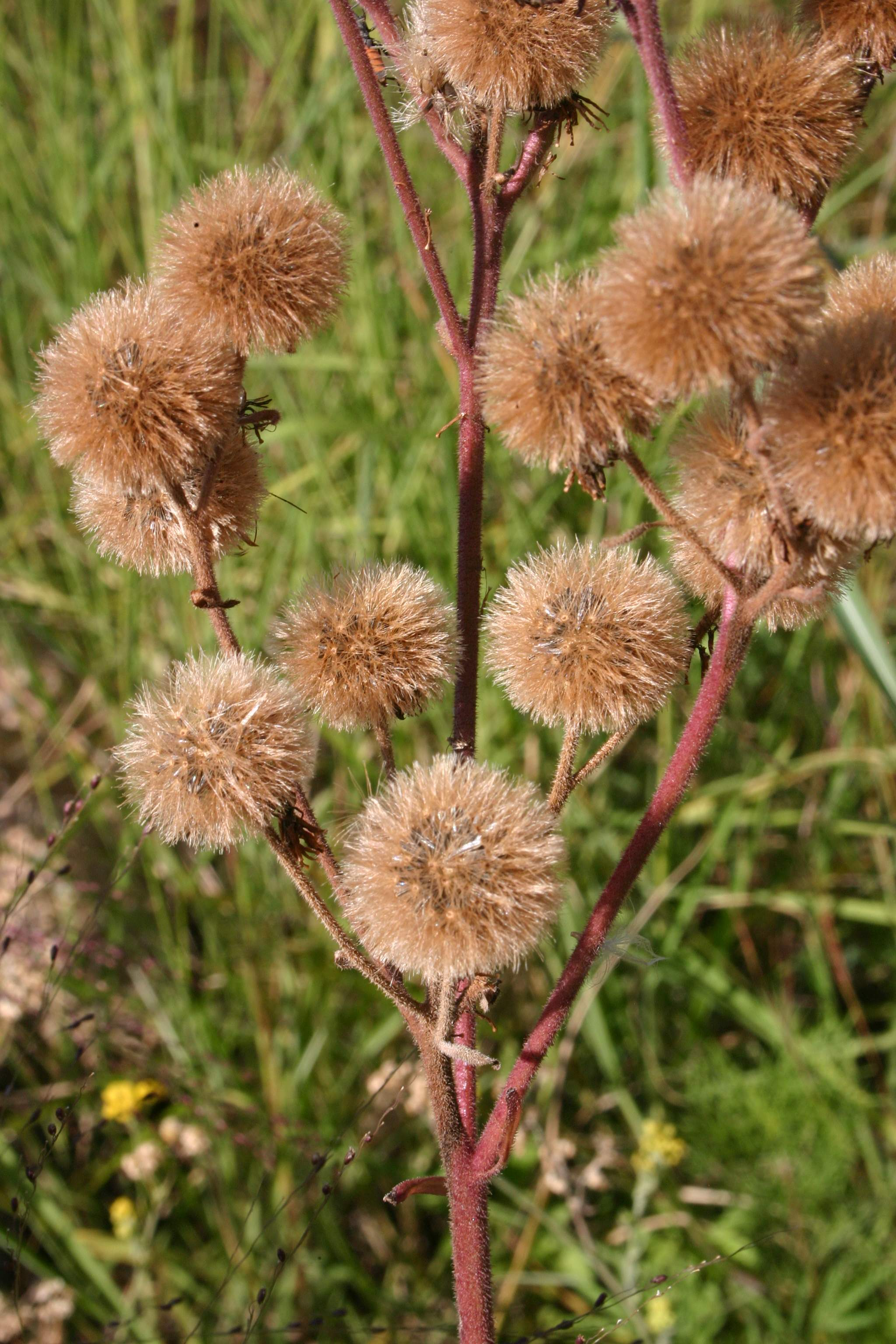
Mature fruiting heads

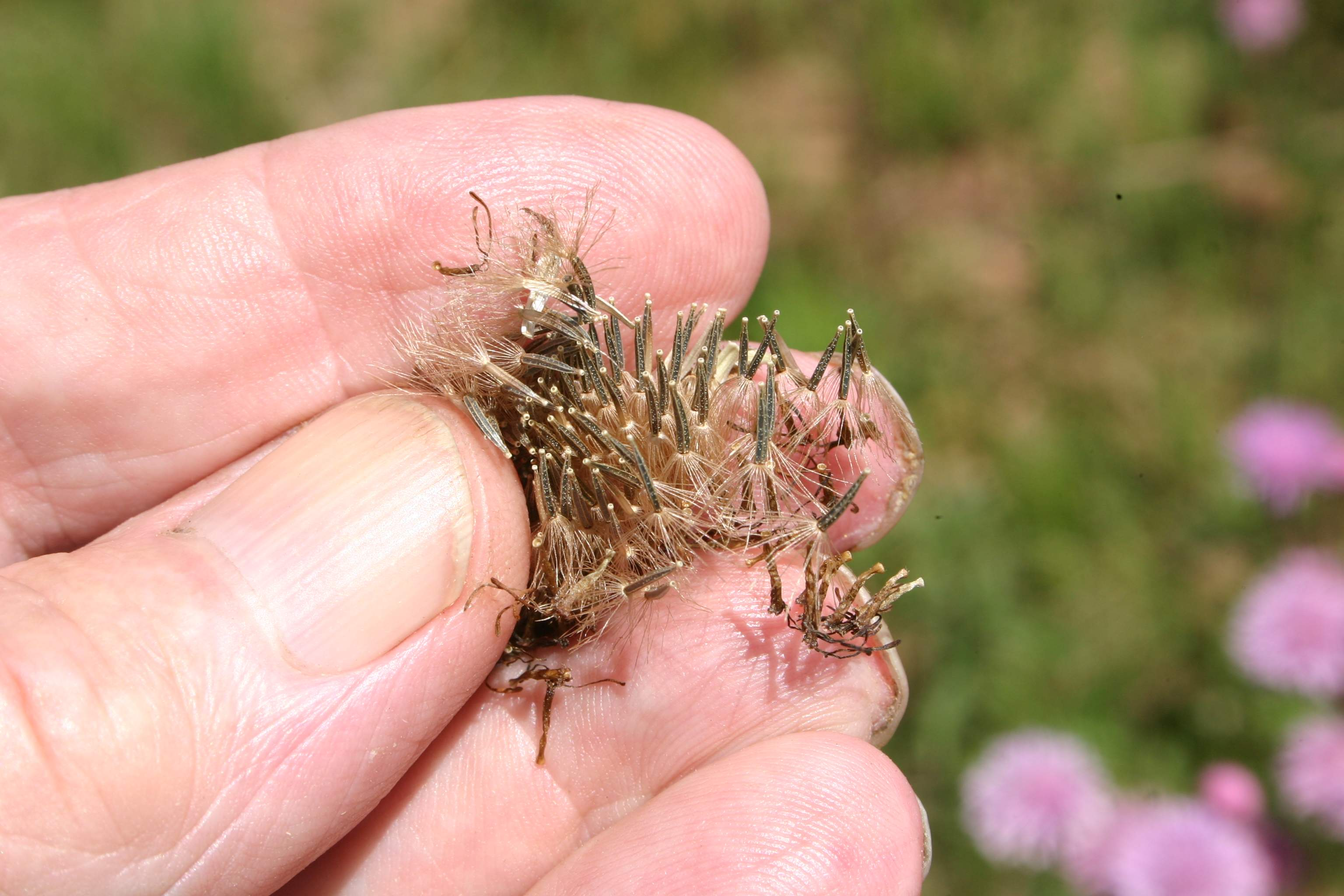
Cypselae or achene-like fruits/seeds
