= C. bigelovii =

C. bigelovii may refer to:

- Chromolaena bigelovii, Bigelow's false thoroughwort, a flowering plant species
- Coreopsis bigelovii, the Bigelow coreopsis, a flowering plant species
- Crossosoma bigelovii, the ragged rockflower, a flowering plant species
- Cylindropuntia bigelovii, the teddy bear cholla, a cactus species

== Synonyms ==
- Cirsium bigelovii, a synonym of Cirsium muticum, a flowering plant species
