= Chromolaena squalida =

Scientific classification
- Kingdom: Plantae
- Clade: Tracheophytes
- Clade: Angiosperms
- Clade: Eudicots
- Clade: Asterids
- Order: Asterales
- Family: Asteraceae
- Genus: Chromolaena
- Species: C. squalida

Binomial name
- Chromolaena squalida (DC.) R.M.King & H.Rob.

Synonyms
- Synonymy: Eupatorium crenatum Gardner; Eupatorium dichotomum Sch.Bip. ex Mig.; Eupatorium martii Mart.; Eupatorium martiusii DC.; Eupatorium paulinum Mart. ex Baker 1876 not DC. 1836; Eupatorium sitiense Hieron.; Eupatorium squalidum DC.; Eupatorium subvelutinum DC.; Osmia crenata Sch.Bip.; Osmia martiusii (DC.) Sch.Bip.; Osmia ramosissima Sch.Bip.; Osmia squalida (DC.) Sch.Bip.; Osmia subvelutina (DC.) Sch.Bip.

Species of flowering plant

Chromolaena squalida is a South American species of flowering shrub in the family Asteraceae. It is found in Brazil, Paraguay, Bolivia, Peru, Colombia, Venezuela, Guyana, Suriname.

Chromolaena squalida is a shrub with bristly stems. Leaves are opposite, green above but hairy underneath. The plant produces many small flower heads in a flat-topped array.
