= Falseuncaria brunnescens =

Scientific classification
- Domain: Eukaryota
- Kingdom: Animalia
- Phylum: Arthropoda
- Class: Insecta
- Order: Lepidoptera
- Family: Tortricidae
- Genus: Falseuncaria
- Species: F. brunnescens

Binomial name
- Falseuncaria brunnescens Bai Guo & Guo, 1996

Species of moth

Falseuncaria brunnescens is a species of moth of the family Tortricidae. It is found in Shanxi, China.
