= Pareuchaetes arravaca =

Scientific classification
- Domain: Eukaryota
- Kingdom: Animalia
- Phylum: Arthropoda
- Class: Insecta
- Order: Lepidoptera
- Superfamily: Noctuoidea
- Family: Erebidae
- Subfamily: Arctiinae
- Genus: Pareuchaetes
- Species: P. arravaca

Binomial name
- Pareuchaetes arravaca (Jordan, 1916)

Synonyms
- Ammalo arravaca Jordan, 1916

Species of moth

Pareuchaetes arravaca is a moth of the subfamily Arctiinae. It was described by Karl Jordan in 1916. It is found in French Guiana.
