= Chromolaena trigonocarpa =

Scientific classification
- Kingdom: Plantae
- Clade: Tracheophytes
- Clade: Angiosperms
- Clade: Eudicots
- Clade: Asterids
- Order: Asterales
- Family: Asteraceae
- Genus: Chromolaena
- Species: C. trigonocarpa

Binomial name
- Chromolaena trigonocarpa (Griseb.) R.M.King & H.Rob.

Synonyms
- Eupatorium trigonocarpum Griseb.; Eupatorium vahlianum Urb. ex Duss

Species of flowering plant

Chromolaena trigonocarpa is a rare Caribbean species of flowering shrub in the family Asteraceae. It is found only the Island of Dominica in the Lesser Antilles.

Chromolaena trigonocarpa is a branching shrub or subshrub with curved hairs on the stem. It has opposite leaves with teeth and a pointed tip. Flower heads are displayed in a flat-topped array.
