= Pareuchaetes aurata =

Scientific classification
- Kingdom: Animalia
- Phylum: Arthropoda
- Clade: Pancrustacea
- Class: Insecta
- Order: Lepidoptera
- Superfamily: Noctuoidea
- Family: Erebidae
- Subfamily: Arctiinae
- Genus: Pareuchaetes
- Species: P. aurata

Binomial name
- Pareuchaetes aurata (Butler, 1875)

Synonyms
- Euchaetes aurata Butler, 1875; Diacrisia pulverea Hampson, 1905; Ammalos girardi Schaus, 1933; Pareuchaetes aurantior Rothschild, 1922

Species of moth

Pareuchaetes aurata is a moth of the subfamily Arctiinae. It was described by Arthur Gardiner Butler in 1875. It is found in Brazil, Argentina and Paraguay.

== Subspecies ==
- Pareuchaetes aurata aurata (Brazil, Argentina, Paraguay)
- Pareuchaetes aurata aurantior Rothschild, 1922 (Brazil)
