= Cochylis campuloclinium =

Scientific classification
- Kingdom: Animalia
- Phylum: Arthropoda
- Clade: Pancrustacea
- Class: Insecta
- Order: Lepidoptera
- Family: Tortricidae
- Genus: Cochylis
- Species: C. campuloclinium

Binomial name
- Cochylis campuloclinium Brown, 2006

Species of moth

Cochylis campuloclinium is a species of moth of the family Tortricidae. It is found in Argentina.

The larvae feed on Campuloclinium macrocephalum.
