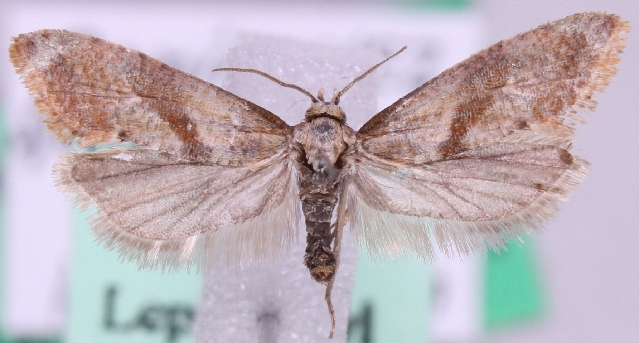
- Falseuncaria degreyana

Scientific classification
- Domain: Eukaryota
- Kingdom: Animalia
- Phylum: Arthropoda
- Class: Insecta
- Order: Lepidoptera
- Family: Tortricidae
- Tribe: Cochylini
- Genus: Falseuncaria; Obraztsov & Swatschek, 1958

= Falseuncaria =

Genus of tortrix moths

Falseuncaria is a genus of moths belonging to the family Tortricidae.

== Species ==
- Falseuncaria aberdarensis Aarvik, 2010
- Falseuncaria brunnescens Bai Guo & Guo, 1996
- Falseuncaria degreyana (McLachlan, 1869)
- Falseuncaria kaszabi Razowski, 1966
- Falseuncaria lechriotoma Razowski, 1970
- Falseuncaria rjaboviana Kuznetzov, 1979
- Falseuncaria ruficiliana (Haworth, [1811])

== See also ==
- List of Tortricidae genera
