= Pareuchaetes =

Scientific classification
- Kingdom: Animalia
- Phylum: Arthropoda
- Class: Insecta
- Order: Lepidoptera
- Superfamily: Noctuoidea
- Family: Erebidae
- Subfamily: Arctiinae
- Tribe: Arctiini
- Subtribe: Phaegopterina
- Genus: Pareuchaetes; Grote, [1866]

Genus of moths

Pareuchaetes is a genus of moths in the family Erebidae. The genus was erected by Augustus Radcliffe Grote in 1866.

== Species ==
- Pareuchaetes arravaca (Jordan, 1916)
- Pareuchaetes aurata (Butler, 1875)
- Pareuchaetes bipunctata (Walker, 1855)
- Pareuchaetes insulata (Walker, 1855) – yellow-winged pareuchaetes moth
- Pareuchaetes misantlensis Rego Barros, 1956
- Pareuchaetes pseudoinsulata Rego Barros, 1956
