= Chromolaena oteroi =

Scientific classification
- Kingdom: Plantae
- Clade: Tracheophytes
- Clade: Angiosperms
- Clade: Eudicots
- Clade: Asterids
- Order: Asterales
- Family: Asteraceae
- Genus: Chromolaena
- Species: C. oteroi

Binomial name
- Chromolaena oteroi (Monach.) R.M.King & H.Rob

Synonyms
- Eupatorium oteroi Monach.

Species of flowering plant

Chromolaena oteroi, commonly known as the Mona Island thoroughwort, is a species of flowering shrub in the family Asteraceae. It has been found only on Mona Island, a small island between Puerto Rico and Hispaniola in the West Indies and politically a part of the Commonwealth of Puerto Rico.

The shrub, with its pale purple flowers, was named after botanist José I. Otero.
