= Chromolaena borinquensis =

Scientific classification
- Kingdom: Plantae
- Clade: Tracheophytes
- Clade: Angiosperms
- Clade: Eudicots
- Clade: Asterids
- Order: Asterales
- Family: Asteraceae
- Genus: Chromolaena
- Species: C. borinquensis

Binomial name
- Chromolaena borinquensis (Britton) R.M.King & H.Rob

Synonyms
- Eupatorium borinquense (Britton) B.L.Rob.; Osmia borinquensis Britton

Species of plant

Chromolaena borinquensis, the limestone thoroughwort, is a species of flowering vine in the family Asteraceae. It is endemic to the island of Puerto Rico.

The epithet borinquensis is derived from a Latinized version of the word Boriquen, Indigenous Taíno name for the island.
