= Pareuchaetes misantlensis =

Scientific classification
- Domain: Eukaryota
- Kingdom: Animalia
- Phylum: Arthropoda
- Class: Insecta
- Order: Lepidoptera
- Superfamily: Noctuoidea
- Family: Erebidae
- Subfamily: Arctiinae
- Genus: Pareuchaetes
- Species: P. misantlensis

Binomial name
- Pareuchaetes misantlensis Rego Barros, 1956

Species of moth

Pareuchaetes misantlensis is a moth of the subfamily Arctiinae. It was described by Alfredo Rei do Régo Barros in 1956. It is found in Mexico.
