= Chromolaena impetiolaris =

Scientific classification
- Kingdom: Plantae
- Clade: Tracheophytes
- Clade: Angiosperms
- Clade: Eudicots
- Clade: Asterids
- Order: Asterales
- Family: Asteraceae
- Genus: Chromolaena
- Species: C. impetiolaris

Binomial name
- Chromolaena impetiolaris (Griseb.) Nicolson

Synonyms
- Eupatorium impetiolare Griseb.

Species of flowering plant

Chromolaena impetiolaris is a rare Caribbean species of flowering shrub in the family Asteraceae. It is endemic to the island of Dominica.

Chromolaena impetiolaris is a shrub lacking hairs on its herbage. It has opposite leaves with no petioles but with numerous small glands on the blades. Flower heads are displayed in a flat-topped array.
