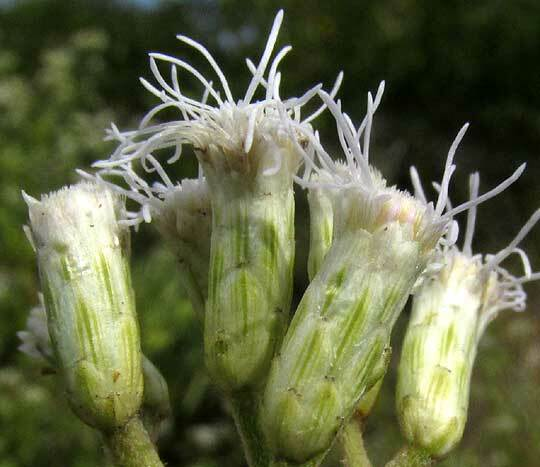
- Chromolaena lundellii flowers

Scientific classification
- Kingdom: Plantae
- Clade: Tracheophytes
- Clade: Angiosperms
- Clade: Eudicots
- Clade: Asterids
- Order: Asterales
- Family: Asteraceae
- Genus: Chromolaena
- Species: C. lundellii

Binomial name
- Chromolaena lundellii R.M.King & H.Rob.

Synonyms
- Eupatorium lundellii (R.M.King & H.Rob.) B.L.Turner

= Chromolaena lundellii =

Species of plant

Chromolaena lundellii is a species of flowering plant belonging to the family Asteraceae. In that vast family it is further is assigned to the subfamily Asteroideae, the tribe Eupatorieae and the subtribe Praxelinae. In English, all Chromolaena species are known as chromolaenas, and this species may be called Lundell's chromolaena.

== Description ==
The original 1978 Latin description of Chromolaena lundellii describes the type specimen as an erect, herbaceous, moderately branched plant about 70cms tall. Its leaves are oval to narrowly oval and arise opposite one another on green, somewhat rounded and sparsely hairy stems. Leaf petioles are up to 10mm long and the blades reach 4.5 cm long and 2.3 cm wide. The leaves are 3-nerved from the base, their margins are indented with low, blunt to rounded tips; blade tips narrow to not too-sharp tips. Leaf upper surfaces are sparsely hairy.

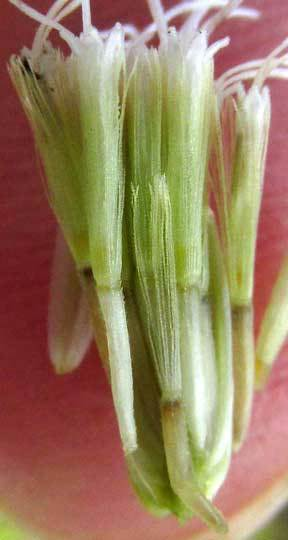
Chromolaena lundellii dissected flowering head

Flowering heads, or capitula, are about 10mm high, and arranged in inflorescences composed of barely flat-topped cymes, the heads borne atop pedicels up to 10m long. About 25 involucral bracts of varying lengths are up to 5mm long by 1.3mm wide, and somewhat rounded at their tips; about 4 green ribs run up each bract. Heads contain about 30 florets. Corollas are up to 5mm long, with lobes about 0.4mm long. The corolla's outer wall is densely covered with papilla, which are minute, nipple-like protuberances. The type description describes corollas as azure-purple. However, the iNaturalist web page showing observations of Chromolaena lundellii mostly show flowers with white corollas, though there a few with pale bluish hues.

The tribe Eupatorieae contains over 2500 species with many of those species similar in appearance to Chromolaena lundellii. In the context of Chromolaena lundellii belonging to the subgenus Chromolaena, the species differs from C. heteroclinia of Jamaica and C. frustrata of Florida in that its stems and leaves are hairier, leaf undersurfaces are densely glandular, inner involucral bracts on its larger flower heads are pointed, and the inner bracts often are reddish tipped. Style branches are broadened.

== Distribution ==
Chromolaena lundellii in endemic to southeastern Mexico and Guatemala.

== Habitat ==
In Mexico's tropical Yucatan Peninsula Chromolaena lundellii, is described as inhabiting forests of medium height composed of broadleaf sub-evergreen and sub-deciduous species, and low-growing forests of deciduous species. This is part of the Tropical and subtropical dry broadleaf forests habitat type with long dry seasons.

== Taxonomy ==
The name Eupatorium lundellii (R.M.King & H.Rob.) B.L.Turner is considered a homotypic synonym. Homotypic synonyms are names referring to the same type specimen as another name, in this case Chromolaena lundellii. Which name is used is decided by what becomes accepted in the scientific literature, following formal ICN rules.

== Etymology ==
The genus name Chromolaena is based on the Greek chroma, meaning "color", and laina, meaning "cloak", evidently alluding to the colored involucral bracts of some species of the genus.

The species name lundellii surely honors Cyrus Longworth Lundell, a prolific US botanist, who edited the journal Wrightia in which the name Chromolaena lundellii was first published.

== Gallery ==
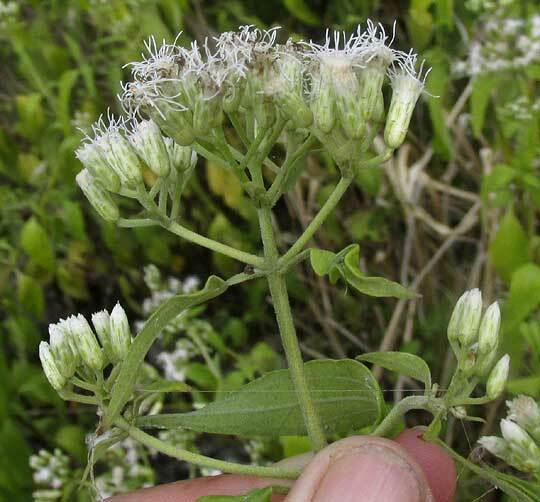
Chromolaena lundellii inflorescence

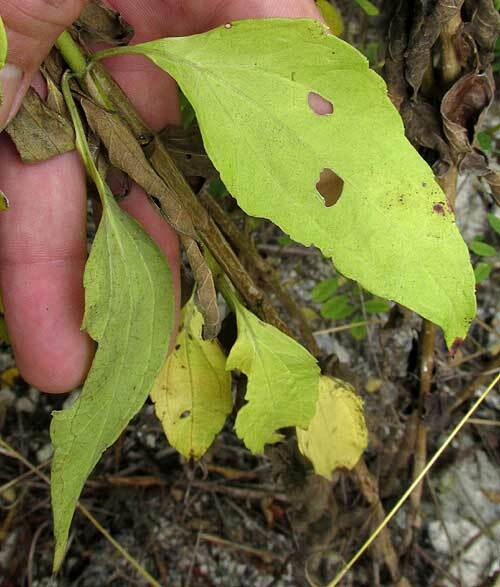
Chromolaena lundellii leaves

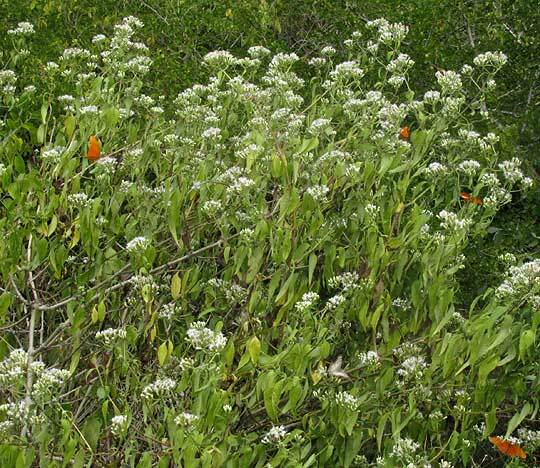
Chromolaena lundellii attracting butterflies
