= Falseuncaria rjaboviana =

Scientific classification
- Domain: Eukaryota
- Kingdom: Animalia
- Phylum: Arthropoda
- Class: Insecta
- Order: Lepidoptera
- Family: Tortricidae
- Genus: Falseuncaria
- Species: F. rjaboviana

Binomial name
- Falseuncaria rjaboviana Kuznetzov, 1979

Species of moth

Falseuncaria rjaboviana is a species of moth of the family Tortricidae. It is found in the country of Georgia.
