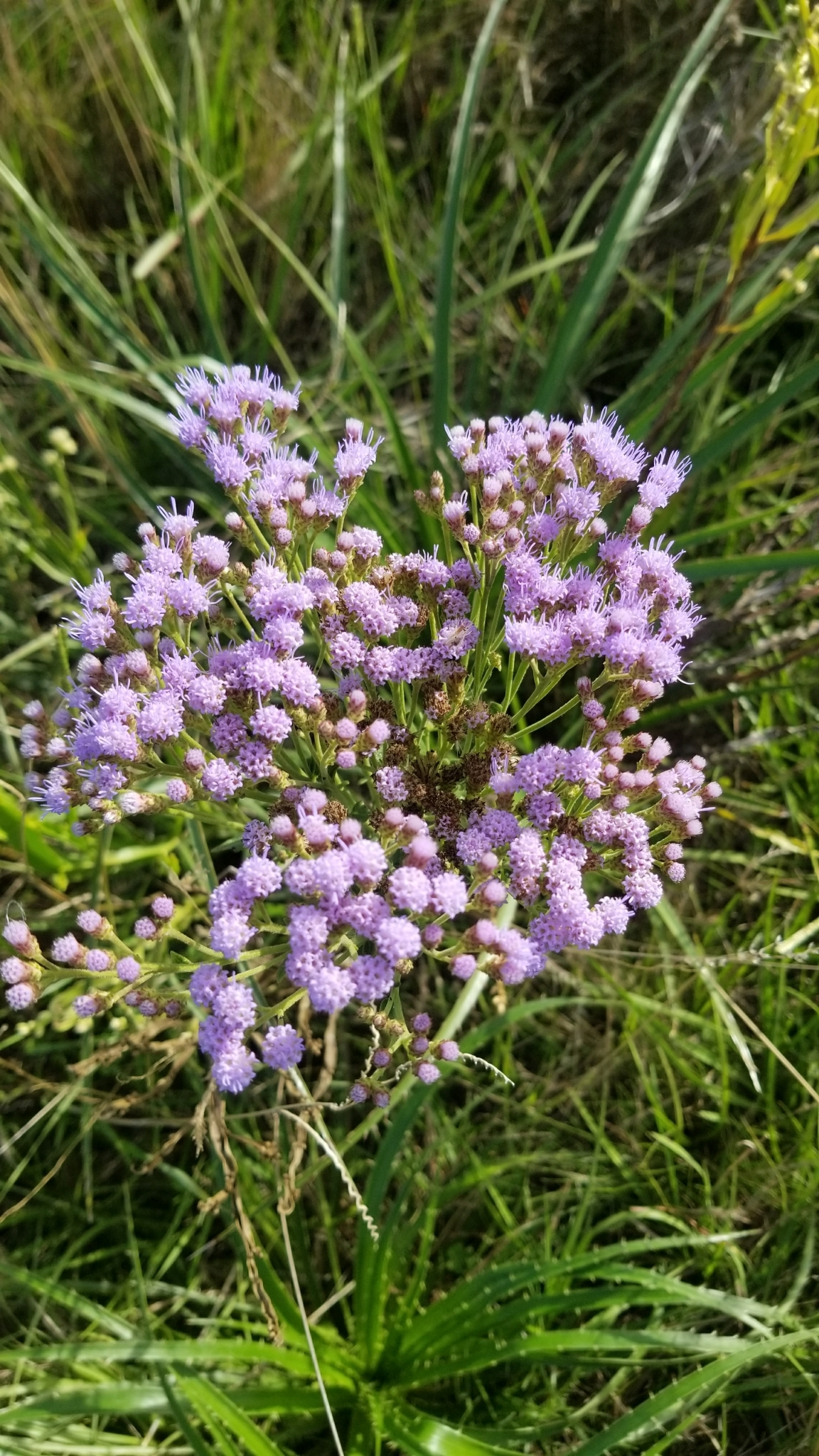

Scientific classification
- Kingdom: Plantae
- Clade: Tracheophytes
- Clade: Angiosperms
- Clade: Eudicots
- Clade: Asterids
- Order: Asterales
- Family: Asteraceae
- Genus: Chromolaena
- Species: C. hirsuta

Binomial name
- Chromolaena hirsuta (Hook. & Arn.) R.M.King & H.Rob

Synonyms
- Synonymy: Eupatorium bartsiaefolium DC.; Eupatorium bartsiifolium DC.; Eupatorium hexanthum DC.; Eupatorium hirsutum Hook. & Arn.; Eupatorium stenolepis Steetz; Eupatorium teucriifolium D.Don ex Hook. & Arn.; Eupatorium trichophorum DC.; Osmia bartsiaefolia (DC.) Sch.Bip.; Osmia bartsiifolia (DC.) Sch.Bip.; Osmia hexantha (DC.) Sch.Bip.; Osmia trichophora (DC.) Sch.Bip.

= Chromolaena hirsuta =

Species of flowering plant

Chromolaena hirsuta is a South American species of flowering shrub in the family Asteraceae. It is native to Brazil, Bolivia, Uruguay, and Argentina.
