= Falseuncaria kaszabi =

Scientific classification
- Kingdom: Animalia
- Phylum: Arthropoda
- Class: Insecta
- Order: Lepidoptera
- Family: Tortricidae
- Genus: Falseuncaria
- Species: F. kaszabi

Binomial name
- Falseuncaria kaszabi Razowski, 1966

Species of moth

Falseuncaria kaszabi is a species of moth of the family Tortricidae. It is found in China (Gansu, Inner Mongolia, Ningxia, Qinghai, Shaanxi) and Mongolia.
