= Pareuchaetes bipunctata =

Scientific classification
- Kingdom: Animalia
- Phylum: Arthropoda
- Class: Insecta
- Order: Lepidoptera
- Superfamily: Noctuoidea
- Family: Erebidae
- Subfamily: Arctiinae
- Genus: Pareuchaetes
- Species: P. bipunctata

Binomial name
- Pareuchaetes bipunctata (Walker, 1855)

Synonyms
- Halesidota bipunctata Walker, 1855

Species of moth

Pareuchaetes bipunctata is a moth of the subfamily Arctiinae first described by Francis Walker in 1855. It is found in the Brazilian state of Pará.
