= Chromolaena integrifolia =

Scientific classification
- Kingdom: Plantae
- Clade: Tracheophytes
- Clade: Angiosperms
- Clade: Eudicots
- Clade: Asterids
- Order: Asterales
- Family: Asteraceae
- Genus: Chromolaena
- Species: C. integrifolia

Binomial name
- Chromolaena integrifolia (Bertero ex Spreng.) R.M.King & H.Rob.

Synonyms
- Eupatorium integrifolium Bertero ex Spreng.; Osmia integrifolia Sch.Bip.

Species of flowering plant

Chromolaena integrifolia is a Caribbean species of flowering shrub in the family Asteraceae. It is found on the Islands of Dominica, Guadeloupe, La Desirade, Les Saintes, Marie Galante, Montserrat, and St. Kitts in the Lesser Antilles.
