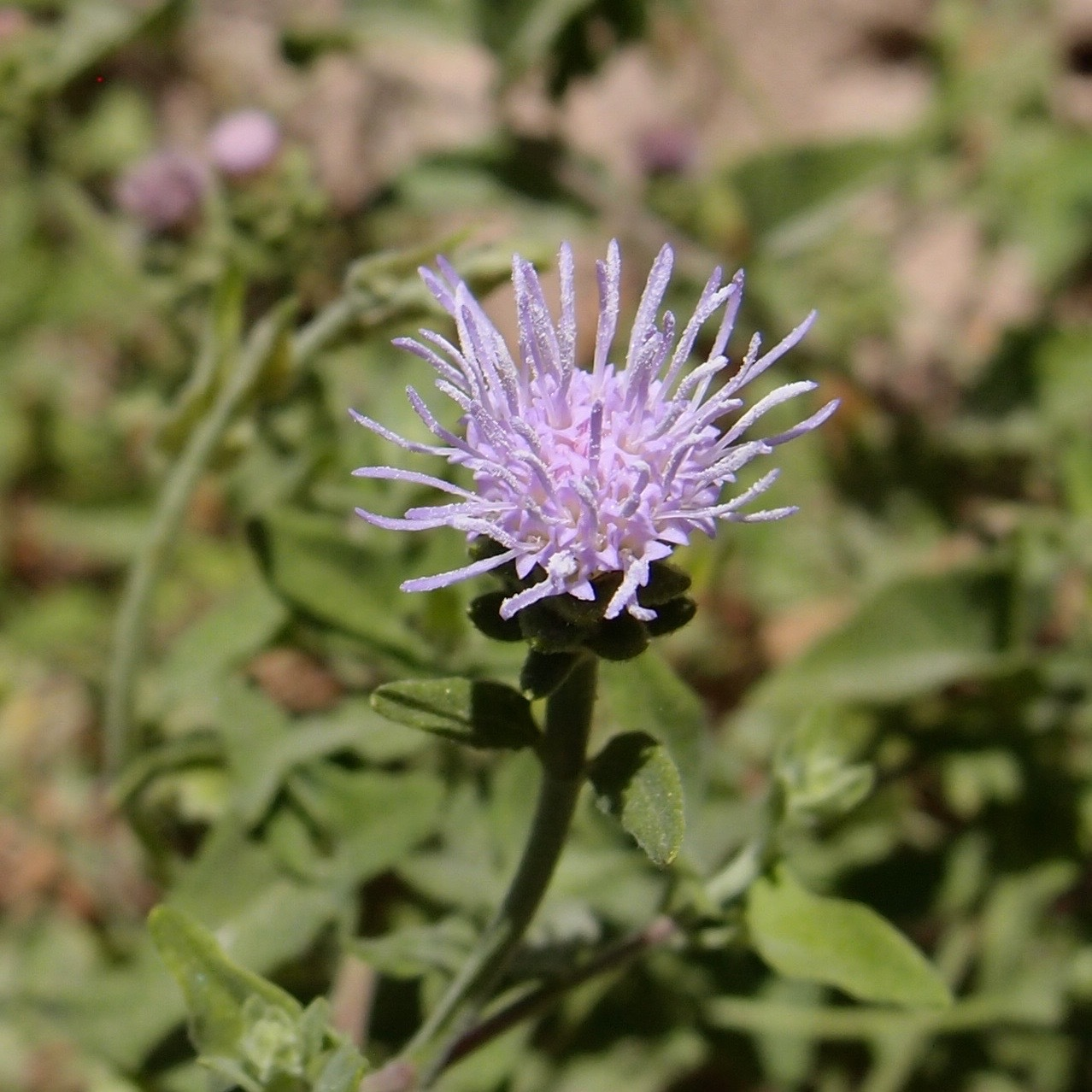

Scientific classification
- Kingdom: Plantae
- Clade: Tracheophytes
- Clade: Angiosperms
- Clade: Eudicots
- Clade: Asterids
- Order: Asterales
- Family: Asteraceae
- Genus: Chromolaena
- Species: C. sagittata

Binomial name
- Chromolaena sagittata (A.Gray) R.M.King & H.Rob

Synonyms
- Eupatorium sagittatum A.Gray

= Chromolaena sagittata =

Species of flowering plant

Chromolaena sagittata is a Mexican species of flowering shrub in the family Asteraceae. It is found in western Mexico, in the states of Sonora, Sinaloa, Nayarit, and Baja California Sur.

Chromolaena sagittata is an herb with opposite, arrow-shaped leaves about 2.5 cm (1 inch) long.
