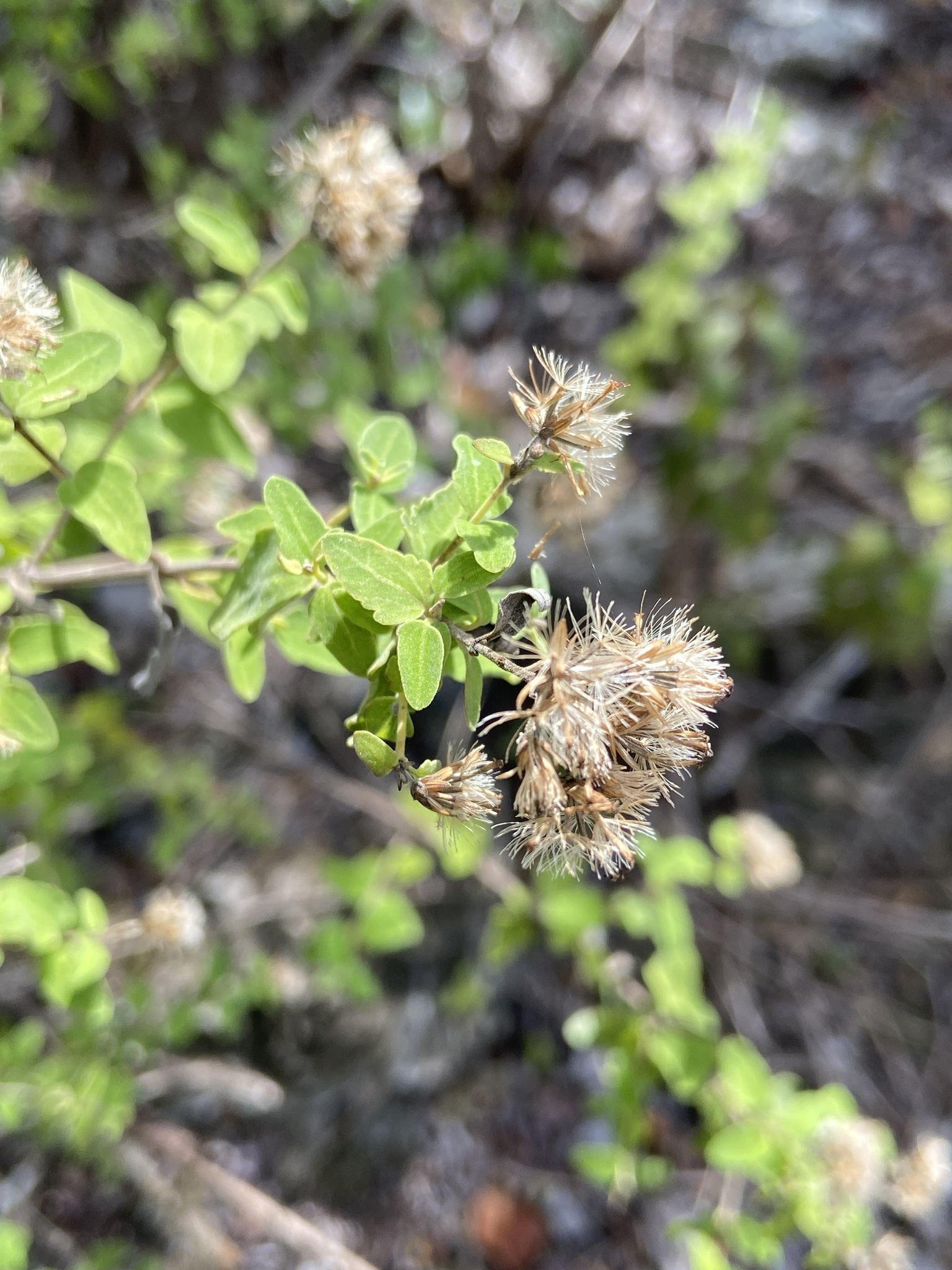

Scientific classification
- Kingdom: Plantae
- Clade: Tracheophytes
- Clade: Angiosperms
- Clade: Eudicots
- Clade: Asterids
- Order: Asterales
- Family: Asteraceae
- Genus: Chromolaena
- Species: C. sinuata

Binomial name
- Chromolaena sinuata (Lam.) R.M.King & H.Rob.

Synonyms
- Eupatorium canescens Vahl; Eupatorium canescens var. adenocarpum DC.; Eupatorium sinuatum Lam.; Osmia sinuata (Lam.) Britton & P.Wilson

= Chromolaena sinuata =

Species of flowering plant

Chromolaena sinuata, the wavyleaf thoroughwort, is a Caribbean species of flowering shrub in the family Asteraceae. It is found on the Islands of Cuba, Hispaniola, Puerto Rico, Guadeloupe, Martinique, La Desirade, Montserrat, St. Eustatius, and Antigua.
