= Chromolaena macrodon =

Scientific classification
- Kingdom: Plantae
- Clade: Tracheophytes
- Clade: Angiosperms
- Clade: Eudicots
- Clade: Asterids
- Order: Asterales
- Family: Asteraceae
- Genus: Chromolaena
- Species: C. macrodon

Binomial name
- Chromolaena macrodon (DC.) Nicolson

Synonyms
- Eupatorium macrodon DC.; Osmia macrodon (DC.) Sch. Bip.

Species of flowering plant

Chromolaena macrodon is a rare Caribbean species of flowering shrub in the family Asteraceae. It is found only the Island of Dominica in the Lesser Antilles.

Chromolaena macrodon is a shrub lacking hairs on its herbage. It has opposite leaves with distinct petioles but without glands on the blades. Flower heads are displayed in a flat-topped array.
