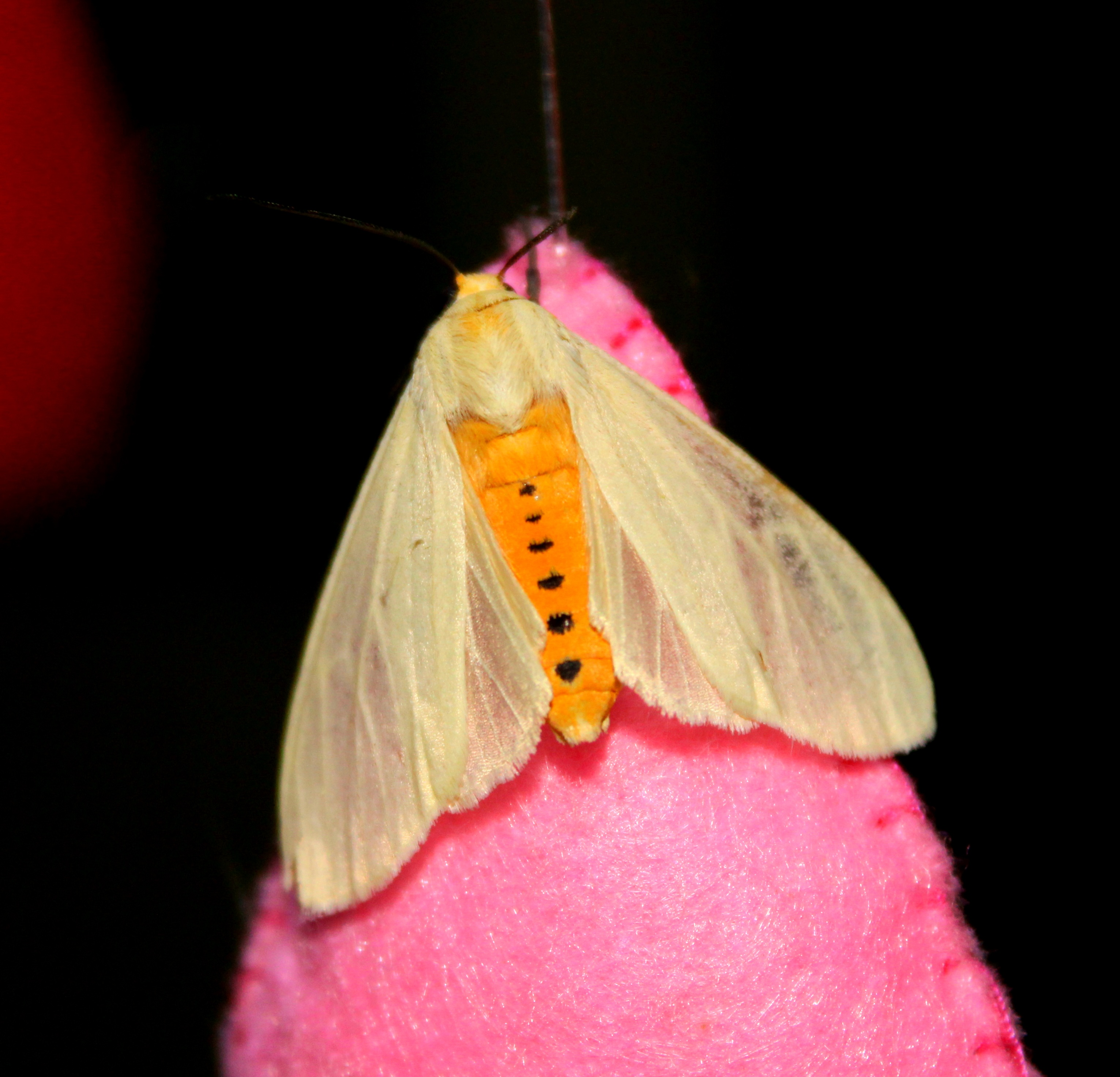

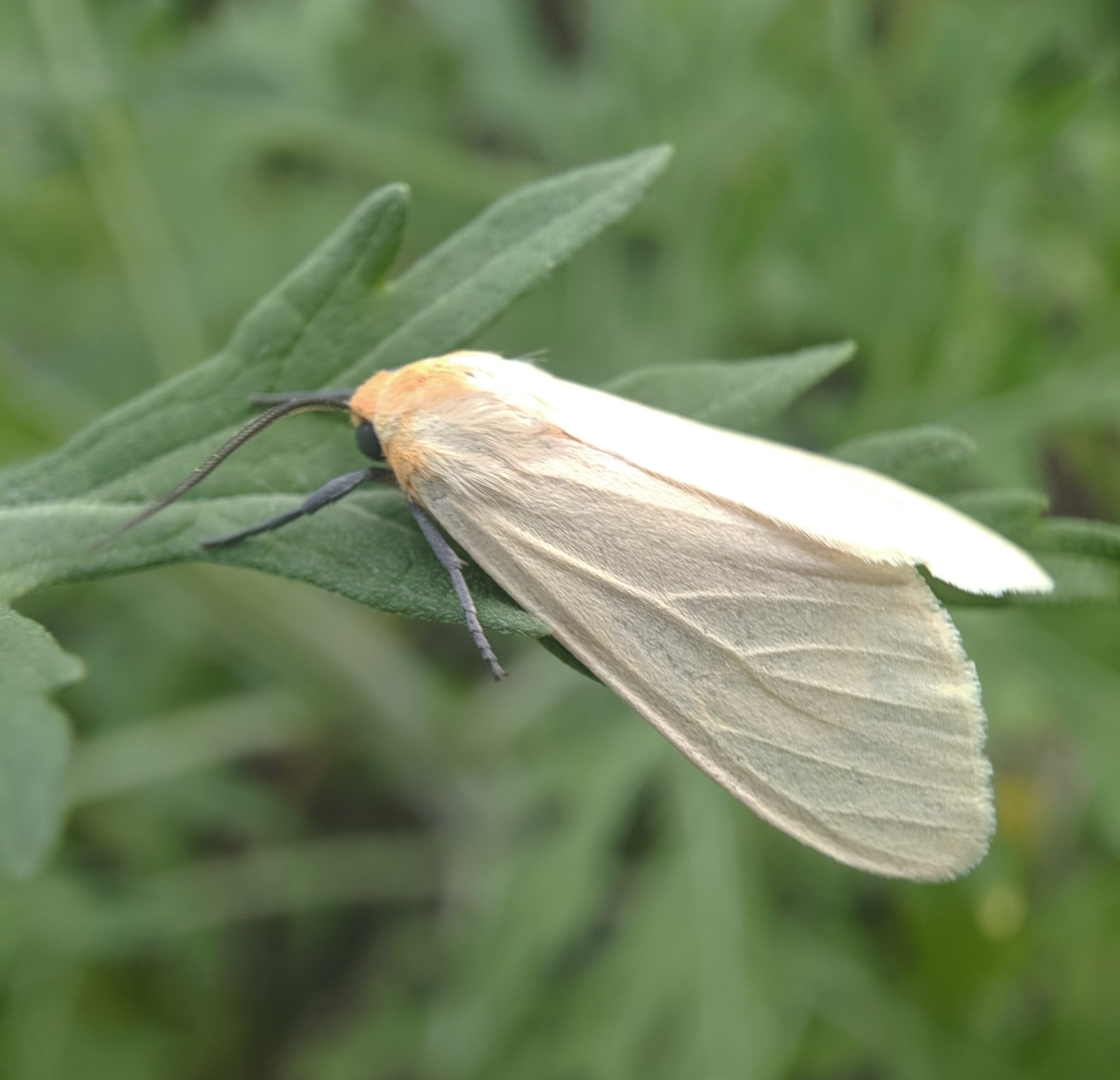

Scientific classification
- Domain: Eukaryota
- Kingdom: Animalia
- Phylum: Arthropoda
- Class: Insecta
- Order: Lepidoptera
- Superfamily: Noctuoidea
- Family: Erebidae
- Subfamily: Arctiinae
- Genus: Pareuchaetes
- Species: P. pseudoinsulata

Binomial name
- Pareuchaetes pseudoinsulata Régo Barros, 1956

= Pareuchaetes pseudoinsulata =

Species of moth

Pareuchaetes pseudoinsulata is a moth of the subfamily Arctiinae native to Venezuela and Trinidad and Tobago. It is an introduced species in Sri Lanka, as well as in Malaysia, Indonesia, the Philippines and Guam.

== Description ==
The wings, thorax, and abdomen are all yellow. The antennae of the male are bipectinated. The mid tibia are clothed with very long hair. The forewings have both antemedial and postmedial tufts on the inner margin.

== Ecology ==
P. pseudoinsulata is an obligate parasite of the weed Chromolaena odorata. Since C. odorata is an invasive species in many tropical regions worldwide, P. pseudoinsulata has been used as a form of biological control.
