= Chromolaena misella =

Scientific classification
- Kingdom: Plantae
- Clade: Tracheophytes
- Clade: Angiosperms
- Clade: Eudicots
- Clade: Asterids
- Order: Asterales
- Family: Asteraceae
- Genus: Chromolaena
- Species: C. misella

Binomial name
- Chromolaena misella (McVaugh) R.M.King & H.Rob.

Synonyms
- Eupatorium misellum McVaugh

Species of flowering plant

Chromolaena misella is a Mexican species of flowering shrub in the family Asteraceae. It is native to the State of Jalisco in western Mexico.

Chromolaena misella is a shrub up to 80 cm (32 inches) tall. Leaves are opposite, 3-nerved, up to 12 cm long. Flower heads are produced in groups of 2-5 heads, with blue disc florets but no ray florets.
