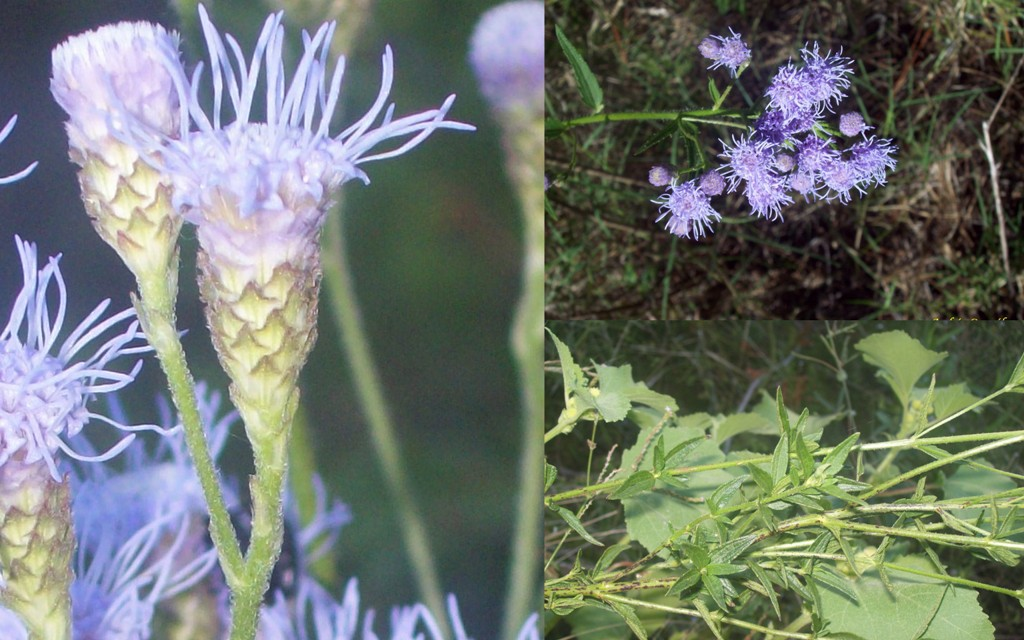

Scientific classification
- Kingdom: Plantae
- Clade: Tracheophytes
- Clade: Angiosperms
- Clade: Eudicots
- Clade: Asterids
- Order: Asterales
- Family: Asteraceae
- Genus: Chromolaena
- Species: C. ivifolia

Binomial name
- Chromolaena ivifolia (L.) R.M.King & H.Rob.

Synonyms
- Synonymy: Eupatorium ivifolium L.; Eupatorium ivaefolium L.; Eupatorium ivaefoliu L.; Chromolaena ivaefolia (L.), King & H.E.Robins; Osmia ivifolia (L.) Sch. Bip.; Chromolaena furcata (Lam.) R.M.King & H.Rob.; Eupatorium affine Kunth; Eupatorium calocephalum (Nutt.) Nutt.; Eupatorium concinnum Hook. & Arn.; Eupatorium fasciculare Poepp.; Eupatorium furcatum Lam.; Eupatorium guanaiense Britton; Eupatorium lineare Malme; Eupatorium obscurum DC.; Liatris oppositifolia Nutt.; Ooclinium clavatum Benth.; Osmia furcata (Lam.) Sch.Bip.; Osmia ivaefolia (L.) Sch.Bip.; Osmia ivifolia (L.) Sch.Bip.; Osmia obscura (DC.) Sch.Bip.

= Chromolaena ivifolia =

Species of flowering plant

Chromolaena ivifolia called ivy-leaf false thoroughwort, or ivyleaf thoroughwort, is a species of flowering shrub in the family Asteraceae. It is native to North America and South America, from the south-eastern United States (eastern Texas, Louisiana, southern Mississippi, southern Alabama, and Florida) to Argentina.

Chromolaena ivifolia is a perennial herb or subshrub up to 150 cm (5 feet) tall. Flower heads are produced in groups at the ends of branches. The heads contain red, purple, or blue disc florets but no ray florets.
