= Falseuncaria aberdarensis =

Scientific classification
- Domain: Eukaryota
- Kingdom: Animalia
- Phylum: Arthropoda
- Class: Insecta
- Order: Lepidoptera
- Family: Tortricidae
- Genus: Falseuncaria
- Species: F. aberdarensis

Binomial name
- Falseuncaria aberdarensis Aarvik, 2010

Species of moth

Falseuncaria aberdarensis is a species of moth of the family Tortricidae. It is found in Kenya.
