= Chromolaena geraniifolia =

Scientific classification
- Kingdom: Plantae
- Clade: Tracheophytes
- Clade: Angiosperms
- Clade: Eudicots
- Clade: Asterids
- Order: Asterales
- Family: Asteraceae
- Genus: Chromolaena
- Species: C. geraniifolia

Binomial name
- Chromolaena geraniifolia (Urb.) R.M.King & H.Rob.

Synonyms
- Eupatorium geranifolium Urb.; Eupatorium geraniifolium Urb.; Osmia geraniifolia (Urb.) Britton & P.Wilson

Species of flowering plant

Chromolaena geraniifolia, the geraniumleaf thoroughwort, is a West Indian species of flowering shrub in the family Asteraceae. It is native to the Commonwealth of Puerto Rico.

Chromolaena geraniifolia is a shrub up to 150 cm (5 feet) high. It produces blue flower heads at the ends of branches.

The epithet geraniifolia means "with leaves like those of a Geranium."
