= Falseuncaria lechriotoma =

Scientific classification
- Kingdom: Animalia
- Phylum: Arthropoda
- Class: Insecta
- Order: Lepidoptera
- Family: Tortricidae
- Genus: Falseuncaria
- Species: F. lechriotoma

Binomial name
- Falseuncaria lechriotoma Razowski, 1970

Species of moth

Falseuncaria lechriotoma is a species of moth of the family Tortricidae. It is found in China (Hebei) and Mongolia.
