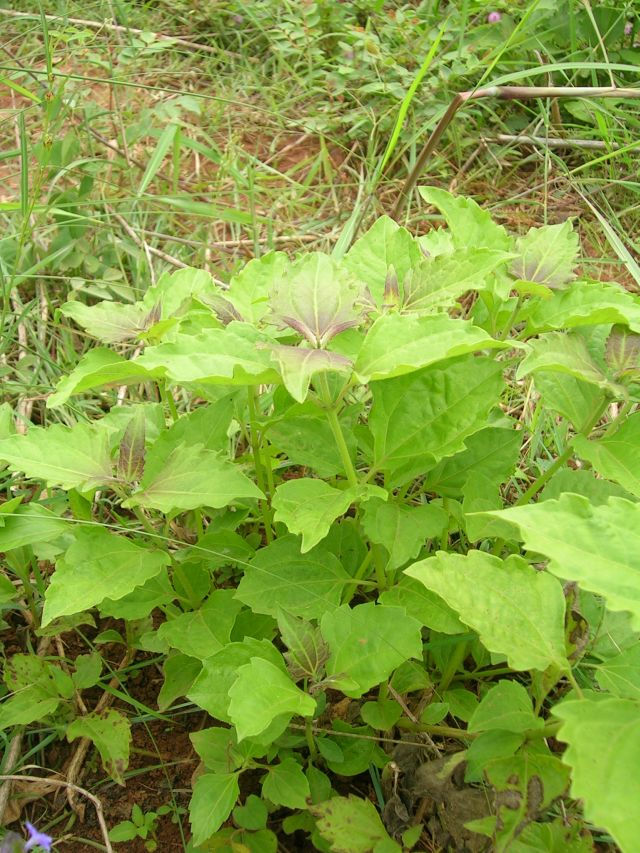
- Chromolaena odorata, considered a weed in many parts of the world

Scientific classification
- Kingdom: Plantae
- Clade: Embryophytes
- Clade: Tracheophytes
- Clade: Spermatophytes
- Clade: Angiosperms
- Clade: Eudicots
- Clade: Asterids
- Order: Asterales
- Family: Asteraceae
- Subfamily: Asteroideae
- Tribe: Eupatorieae
- Genus: Chromolaena; DC.

= Chromolaena =

Genus of flowering plants

Chromolaena is a genus of about 165 species of perennials and shrubs in the family Asteraceae. The name is derived from the Greek words χρῶμα (khrôma), meaning "color", and χλαῑνα (khlaīna) or λαῑνα (laīna) meaning "cloak". It refers to the colored phyllaries of some species. Members of the genus are native to the Americas, from the southern United States to South America (especially Brazil). One species, Chromolaena odorata, has been introduced to many parts of the world where it is considered a weed.

The plants of this genus were earlier taxonomically classified under the genus Eupatorium, but are now considered to be more closely related to other genera in the tribe Eupatorieae.

== Species ==
As of September, 2025, there were 163 accepted Chromolaena species.

Here is a sample of those species:

- Chromolaena bigelovii (A.Gray) R.M.King & H.Rob. – Bigelow's thoroughwort
- Chromolaena borinquensis (Britt.) R.M.King & H.Rob. – limestone thoroughwort
- Chromolaena corymbosa (Aubl.) R.M.King & H.Rob. – Caribbean thoroughwort
- Chromolaena frustrata (B.L.Rob.) R.M.King & H.Rob. – Cape Sable thoroughwort
- Chromolaena geraniifolia (Urb.) R.M.King & H.Rob. – geraniumleaf thoroughwort (Puerto Rico)
- Chromolaena hirsuta (Hook. & Arn.) R.M.King & H.Rob.
- Chromolaena impetiolaris (Griseb.) Nicolson
- Chromolaena integrifolia (Bertero ex Spreng.) R.M.King & H.Rob.
- Chromolaena ivifolia R.M.King & H.Rob. – ivyleaf thoroughwort
- Chromolaena lundellii R.M.King & H.Rob.
- Chromolaena macrodon (DC.) Nicolson
- Chromolaena misella (McVaugh) R.M.King & H.Rob.
- Chromolaena odorata (L.) R.M.King & H.Rob. – Jack in the bush
- Chromolaena oteroi (Monachino) R.M.King & H.Rob. – Mona Island thoroughwort
- Chromolaena sagittata (A.Gray) R.M.King & H.Rob.
- Chromolaena sinuata (Lam.) R.M.King & H.Rob. – wavyleaf thoroughwort
- Chromolaena squalida (DC.) R.M.King & H.Rob.
- Chromolaena trigonocarpa (Griseb.) R.M.King & H.Rob.
- Chromolaena xalapana B.L.Turner

In Australia some species are called "triffid weed"
