= Eupatoriopsis =

Scientific classification
- Kingdom: Plantae
- Clade: Tracheophytes
- Clade: Angiosperms
- Clade: Eudicots
- Clade: Asterids
- Order: Asterales
- Family: Asteraceae
- Subfamily: Asteroideae
- Tribe: Eupatorieae
- Genus: Eupatoriopsis; Hieron.
- Species: E. hoffmanniana

Binomial name
- Eupatoriopsis hoffmanniana Hieron.

Genus of flowering plants

Eupatoriopsis is a genus of flowering plants in the family Asteraceae.

There is only one known species, Eupatoriopsis hoffmanniana, endemic to the State of Minas Gerais in Brazil.
