= Kearfott-Bane House =

Historic house in West Virginia, United States

- U.S. National Register of Historic Places
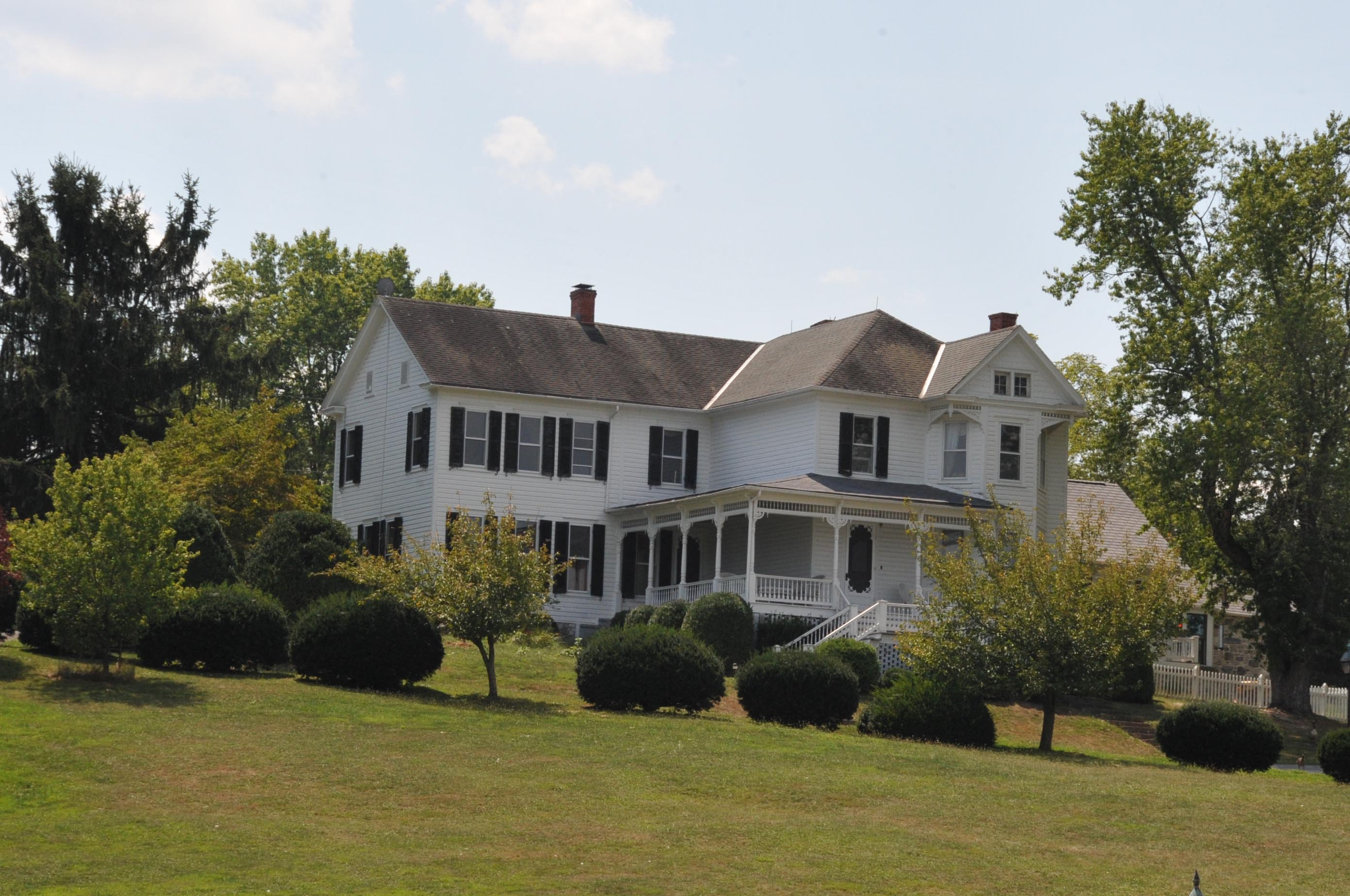

- Location within West Virginia Location within the United States
- Location: WV 36/1, near Baker Heights, West Virginia
- Coordinates: 39°26′2″N 77°55′9″W
- Area: 6 acres (2.4 ha)
- Built: 1901
- Architectural style: Queen Anne
- NRHP reference No.: 85001520
- Added to NRHP: July 8, 1985

Kearfott-Bane House is a historic home located near Baker Heights, Berkeley County, West Virginia. The T-shaped house was built in 1901 in the Queen Anne style. It features fanciful porches, hipped and gable roofs, and generous use of decorative spindles, fans, and other motifs.

It was listed on the National Register of Historic Places in 1985.
