= Lomatozona =

Scientific classification
- Kingdom: Plantae
- Clade: Tracheophytes
- Clade: Angiosperms
- Clade: Eudicots
- Clade: Asterids
- Order: Asterales
- Family: Asteraceae
- Subfamily: Asteroideae
- Tribe: Eupatorieae
- Genus: Lomatozona; Baker

Genus of flowering plants

Lomatozona is a genus of Brazilian flowering plants in the tribe Eupatorieae within the family Asteraceae.

Species

- Lomatozona andersonii R.M.King & H.Rob. - Goiás
- Lomatozona artemisiifolia Baker - Goiás
- Lomatozona huntii R.M.King & H.Rob. - Mato Grosso, Goiás
- Lomatozona inaequale R.M.King & H.Rob. - Mato Grosso, Goiás
