= Praxeliopsis =

Scientific classification
- Kingdom: Plantae
- Clade: Tracheophytes
- Clade: Angiosperms
- Clade: Eudicots
- Clade: Asterids
- Order: Asterales
- Family: Asteraceae
- Subfamily: Asteroideae
- Tribe: Eupatorieae
- Genus: Praxeliopsis; G.M.Barroso
- Species: P. mattogrossensis

Binomial name
- Praxeliopsis mattogrossensis G.M.Barroso

Genus of plants

Praxeliopsis is a genus of plants in the tribe Eupatorieae within the family Asteraceae.

== Species ==
The only known species is Praxeliopsis mattogrossensis, native to Bolivia and to the State of Mato Grosso in Brazil.
