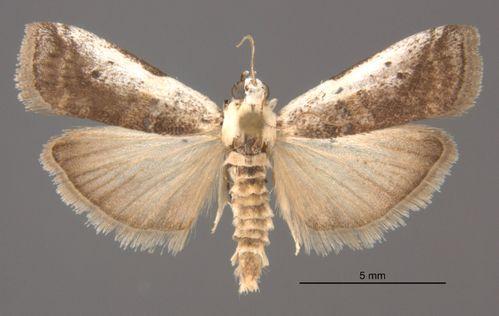

Scientific classification
- Kingdom: Animalia
- Phylum: Arthropoda
- Clade: Pancrustacea
- Class: Insecta
- Order: Lepidoptera
- Family: Pyralidae
- Genus: Acrobasis
- Species: A. kearfottella

Binomial name
- Acrobasis kearfottella Dyar, 1905

= Acrobasis kearfottella =

Kearfott's acrobasis moth

Species of moth

Acrobasis kearfottella, Kearfott's acrobasis moth, is a species of snout moth in the genus Acrobasis. It was described by Harrison Gray Dyar Jr. in 1905, and is known from Quebec, Canada, and the eastern United States. In modern schemes it is usually listed as a junior synonym of Acrobasis tumidulella (Ragonot, 1887), per Leraut, 2005.

The wingspan is about 20 mm. There is one generation per year.

The larvae feed on Carya species, including Carya tomentosa, Carya glabra, Carya ovata and Carya cordiformis. They feed on the newly expanding leaflets of their host plant from within a tube. The species overwinters in the larval stage. Pupation takes place within the tube.
