= Kimberlee Kearfott =

Nuclear physicist and researcher

Kimberlee Jane Kearfott is a professor in the Department of Nuclear Engineering and Radiological Sciences at University of Michigan in Ann Arbor, Michigan. The American Nuclear Society recognised her notable contributions to the field of radiation protection in 2017.

== Early life and education ==
Kearfott studied engineering at St. Mary's University (Nova Scotia) before studying nuclear engineering at University of Virginia. She was awarded a doctoral degree (ScD) in Nuclear Engineering from Massachusetts Institute of Technology in 1980.

== Research and career ==
Kearfott's research interests lie across nuclear engineering, radiological sciences, and biomedical engineering. She is a professor of Nuclear Engineering and Radiological Sciences at the University of Michigan, Biomedical Engineering.

In 2017, Kearfott was awarded the Rockwell Lifetime Achievement Award of the American Nuclear Society (ANS) for her "dedication to the education of students through formal course work, curriculum development, research, and publishing in the field of radiation protection with a specialization in radiation dosimeters, dose assessment, shielding and operational health physics". She had previously been awarded the ANS Mary Jane Oestmann Professional Women's Achievement Award in 1995.

As of 2013, Kearfott also has nine patents, for which she is the primary inventor of three, and the sole inventor of five. The patents cover methods for detecting and measuring radiation.

In 1991, she received the Tetalman Memorial Award from the Society of Nuclear Medicine in recognition of her work as "an engineer, a scientist, a teacher, and an excellent public relations person between nuclear medicine and the society at large". In 2011, during the Fukushima Daiichi nuclear disaster, Kearfott discussed her expertise on various public platforms.

She serves on the advisory board to the US Office of Environmental Management.

== Selected publications ==
- 'Use of a geographic information system (GIS) for targeting radon screening programs in South Dakota', Journal of Radiation Research, 2016.
- 'An affordable optically stimulated luminescent dosimeter reader utilizing multiple excitation wavelengths'. Applied Radiation and Isotopes, 2015.
- 'Artifacts, anatomical and physiological variants, and unrelated diseases that might cause false-positive whole-body 131-I scans in patients with thyroid cancer'. Seminars in Nuclear Medicine, 2000.
- 'A new approach to film dosimetry for high energy photon beams: Lateral scatter filtering'. Medical Physics, 1997.
