= Osmiopsis =

Scientific classification
- Kingdom: Plantae
- Clade: Tracheophytes
- Clade: Angiosperms
- Clade: Eudicots
- Clade: Asterids
- Order: Asterales
- Family: Asteraceae
- Subfamily: Asteroideae
- Tribe: Eupatorieae
- Genus: Osmiopsis; R.M.King & H.Rob.
- Species: O. plumeri

Binomial name
- Osmiopsis plumeri (Urb. & Ekman) R.M.King & H.Rob.

Synonyms
- Osmiopsis plumerii (Urb. & Ekman) R.M.King & H.Rob., alternate spelling; Chromolaena plumeri (Urb. & Ekman) R.M.King & H.Rob.; Eupatorium plumeri Urb. & Ekman

Genus of flowering plants

Osmiopsis is a genus of Haitian flowering plants in the tribe Eupatorieae within the family Asteraceae.

The only known species is Osmiopsis plumeri, native to Haiti.
