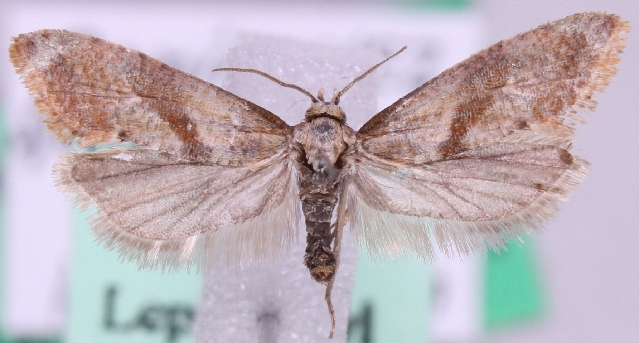

Scientific classification
- Domain: Eukaryota
- Kingdom: Animalia
- Phylum: Arthropoda
- Class: Insecta
- Order: Lepidoptera
- Family: Tortricidae
- Genus: Falseuncaria
- Species: F. degreyana

Binomial name
- Falseuncaria degreyana (McLachlan, 1869)

Synonyms
- Eupoecilia degreyana McLachlan, 1869; Conchylis amoenana var. alaiana Caradja, 1916; Phalonia roseotincta Filipjev, 1924

= Falseuncaria degreyana =

Breckland conch

Species of moth

Falseuncaria degreyana, the Breckland conch, is a species of moth of the family Tortricidae. It is found in China (Xinjiang), Mongolia, Russia and most of Europe. The habitat consists of meadows, rural areas, waysides, heathlands, moorlands and farmland.

The wingspan is 13–15 mm.

There are two generations per year, with adults on wing in May and again from mid-June to September.

The larvae feed on the flowers of Plantago, Linaria and Antirrhinum species. The species overwinters as a cocoon.

The Falseuncaria degreyana is not to be confused with the cochylis roseana, or the cochylis flaviciliana.
