= Chromolaena bigelovii =

Scientific classification
- Kingdom: Plantae
- Clade: Tracheophytes
- Clade: Angiosperms
- Clade: Eudicots
- Clade: Asterids
- Order: Asterales
- Family: Asteraceae
- Genus: Chromolaena
- Species: C. bigelovii

Binomial name
- Chromolaena bigelovii (A.Gray) R.M.King & H.Rob.

Synonyms
- Eupatorium bigelovii A.Gray; Eupatorium madrense S.Watson; Eupatorium turbinatum A.Gray

Species of flowering plant

Chromolaena bigelovii called Bigelow's false thoroughwort, or Bigelow's thoroughwort, is a North American species of flowering shrub in the family Asteraceae. It is native to northeastern Mexico (Coahuila, Nuevo León, San Luis Potosí) and the US State of Texas.

Chromolaena bigelovii is a shrub up to 150 cm (5 feet) tall. Flower heads are produced in groups of 3, but sometimes they grow one at a time. The heads contain blue or white disc florets but no ray florets.
