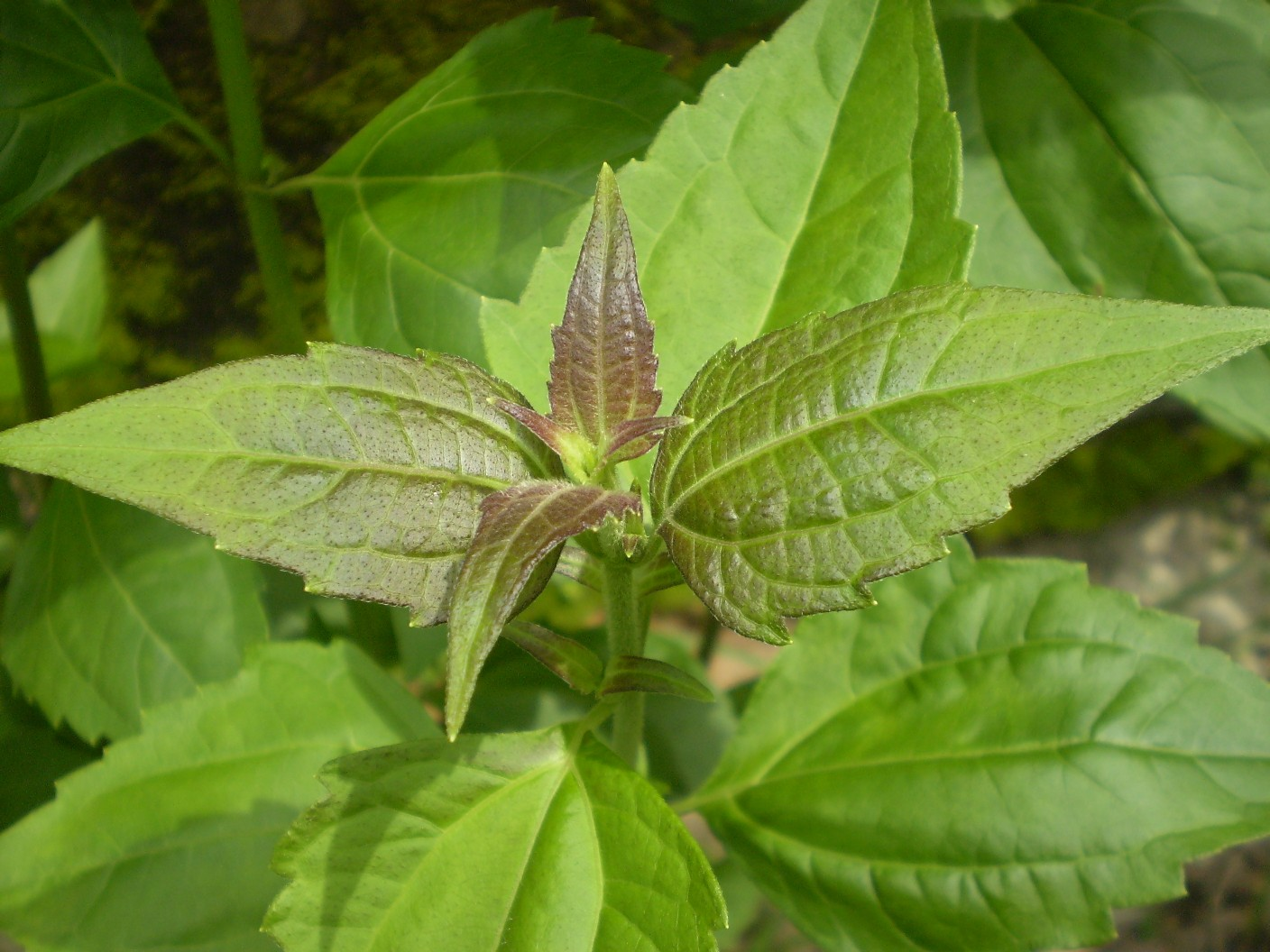

Conservation status
- Secure (NatureServe)

Scientific classification
- Kingdom: Plantae
- Clade: Tracheophytes
- Clade: Angiosperms
- Clade: Eudicots
- Clade: Asterids
- Order: Asterales
- Family: Asteraceae
- Genus: Chromolaena
- Species: C. odorata

Binomial name
- Chromolaena odorata (L.) R.M.King & H.Rob.

Synonyms
- Synonymy: Chrysocoma maculata Vell.; Chrysocoma maculata Vell. Conc.; Chrysocoma volubilis Vell. Conc.; Eupatorium brachiatum Sw. ex Wikstr.; Eupatorium clematitis DC.; Eupatorium conyzoides Mill.; Eupatorium dichotomum Sch.Bip.; Eupatorium divergens Less.; Eupatorium floribundum Kunth; Eupatorium graciliflorum DC.; Eupatorium klattii Millsp.; Eupatorium odoratum L.; Eupatorium sabeanum Buckley; Eupatorium stigmatosum Meyen & Walp.; Osmia atriplicifolia (Vahl) Sch.Bip.; Osmia clematitis (DC.) Sch.Bip.; Osmia divergens (Less.) Sch.Bip.; Osmia floribunda (Kunth) Sch.Bip.; Osmia graciliflora (DC.) Sch.Bip.; Osmia graciliflorum (DC.) Sch.Bip.; Osmia odorata (L.) Sch.Bip.

= Chromolaena odorata =

Species of flowering plant

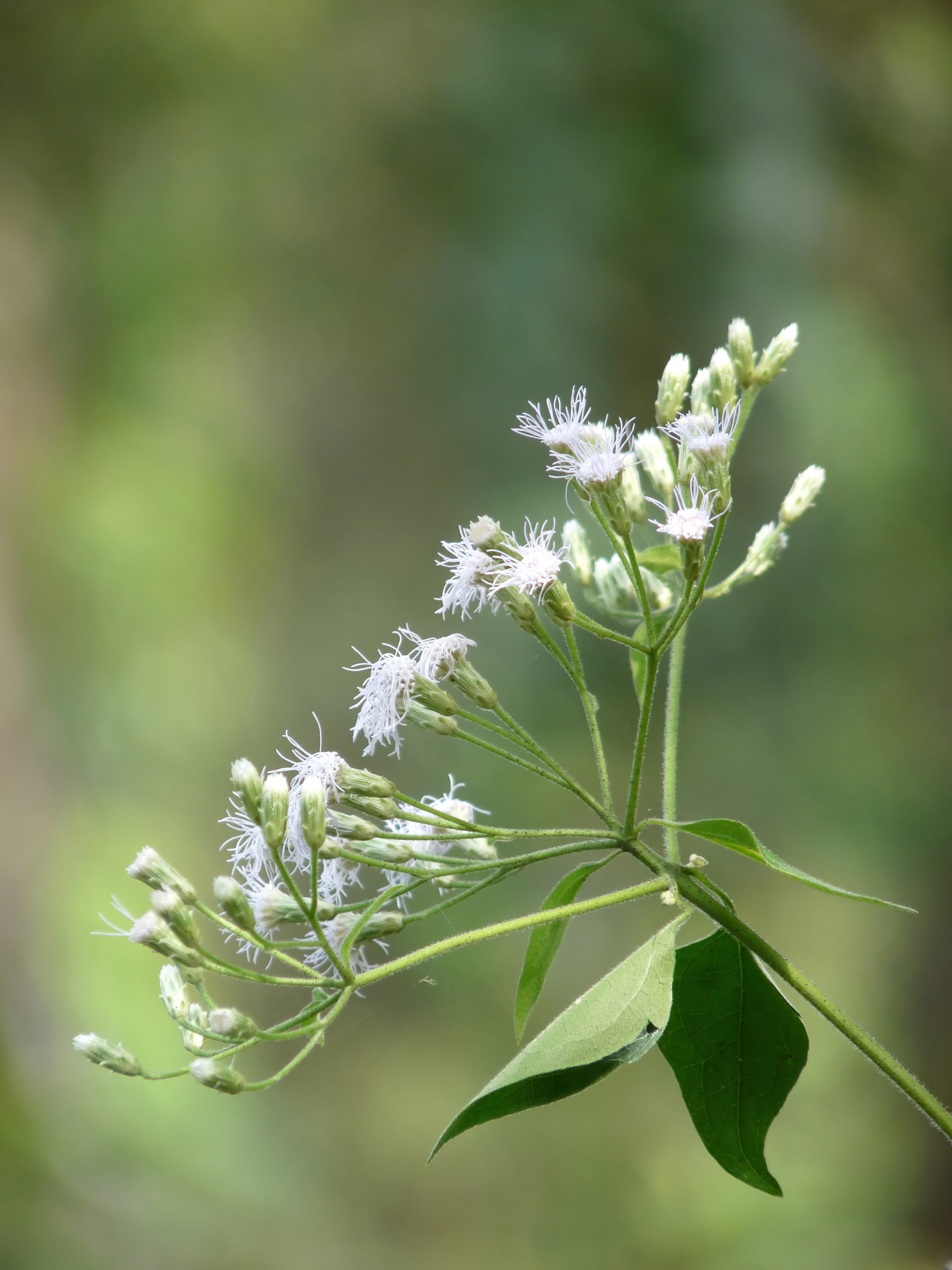
Flower, Kerala

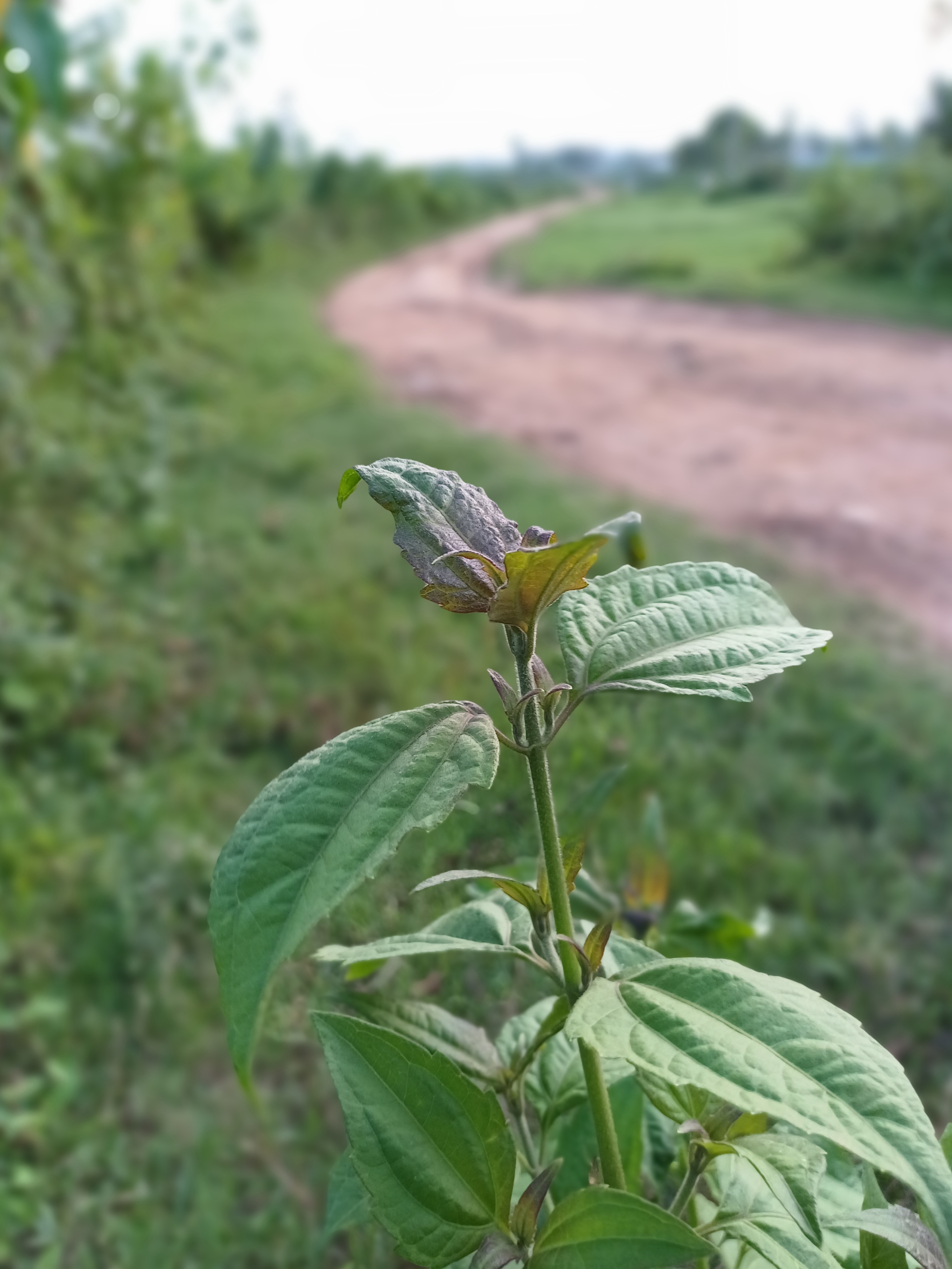
Chromolaena odorata, Bangladesh

Chromolaena odorata is also known as jack in the bush. It is a tropical and subtropical species of flowering shrub in the family Asteraceae. It is native to the Americas, from Florida and Texas in the United States south through Mexico and the Caribbean to South America. It has been introduced to tropical Asia, West Africa, and parts of Australia.

== Description ==
Chromolaena odorata is a rapidly growing perennial herb. It is a multi-stemmed shrub which grows up to 2.5 m (100 inches) tall in open areas. It has soft stems but the base of the shrub is woody. In shady areas it becomes etiolated and behaves as a creeper, growing on other vegetation. It can then become up to 10 m (33 feet) tall. The plant is hairy and glandular and the leaves give off a pungent, aromatic odour when crushed. The leaves are opposite, triangular to elliptical with serrated edges. Leaves are 4–10 cm long by 1–5 cm wide (up to 4 x 2 inches). Leaf petioles are 1–4 cm long. The white to pale pink tubular flowers are in panicles of 10 to 35 flowers that form at the ends of branches. The seeds are achenes and are somewhat hairy. They are mostly spread by the wind, but can also cling to fur, clothes and machinery, enabling long-distance dispersal. Seed production is about 80,000 to 90,000 per plant. Seeds need light to germinate. The plant can regenerate from the roots. In favorable conditions, the plant can grow more than 3 cm per day.

=== Common names ===
Common names include acheampong leaves, siam weed, rouge plant, Christmas bush, triffid, or jack in the box, among others according to region and language.

== Classification ==
It was earlier taxonomically classified under the genus Eupatorium, but is now considered more closely related to other genera in the tribe Eupatorieae.

== Invasive species ==
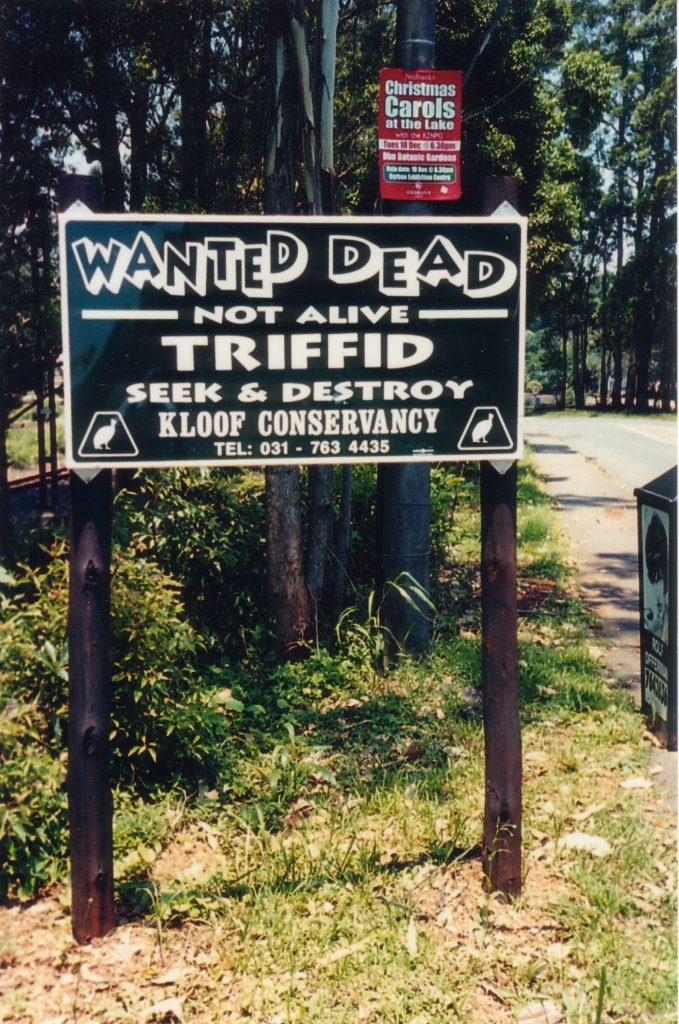
A sign in Kloof, South Africa encouraging the elimination of Chromolaena odorata, colloquially known as Triffids

Chromolaena odorata is considered an invasive weed of field crops and natural environments in its introduced range. It has been reported to be the most problematic invasive species within protected rainforests in Africa. In Western Africa it prevents regeneration of tree species in areas of shifting cultivation. It affects species diversity in southern Africa. The plant's flammability affects forest edges.

In Sri Lanka it is a major weed in disturbed areas and coconut plantations.

== Control ==
Biological control with a defoliating Arctiid moth was attempted in the 1970s.

A pilot study in the Ashanti region of Ghana introduced the moth Pareuchaetes pseudoinsulata to some effect.

In Australia a systematic eradication programme with herbicide has been initiated.

The gall-forming tephritid fly Cecidochares connexa was introduced into Guam from Indonesia in 1998 and is widespread across the island. Chromolaena odorata forms galls around the fly larvae that become a nutrient sink that diverts energy away from plant growth to provide nutritive tissue along the walls of the larval chamber. Between 1 and 7 larvae can be found in each gall. The size of C. connexa plants on the island was seen to decline in the year 2009–2010, probably as a result of this introduction.

== History of introduction ==
In the 19th century, Chromolaena odorata escaped from the botanical gardens at Dacca (Bangladesh), Java (Indonesia) and Peradeniya (Sri Lanka). In Western Africa, the plant was accidentally introduced with forestry seeds. In Southern Africa, it was introduced as an ornamental, and in Ivory Coast in 1952 to control Imperata grasses. It was first found in Queensland, Australia in 1994 and was perhaps introduced with foreign pasture seeds. Chromolaena odorata was found on the eastern portion of the Big Island of Hawai'i in 2021.

== Toxicity ==
Chromolaena odorata is toxic to cattle and is larvicidal against all major mosquito vectors. It can also cause allergic reactions.

== Gallery ==
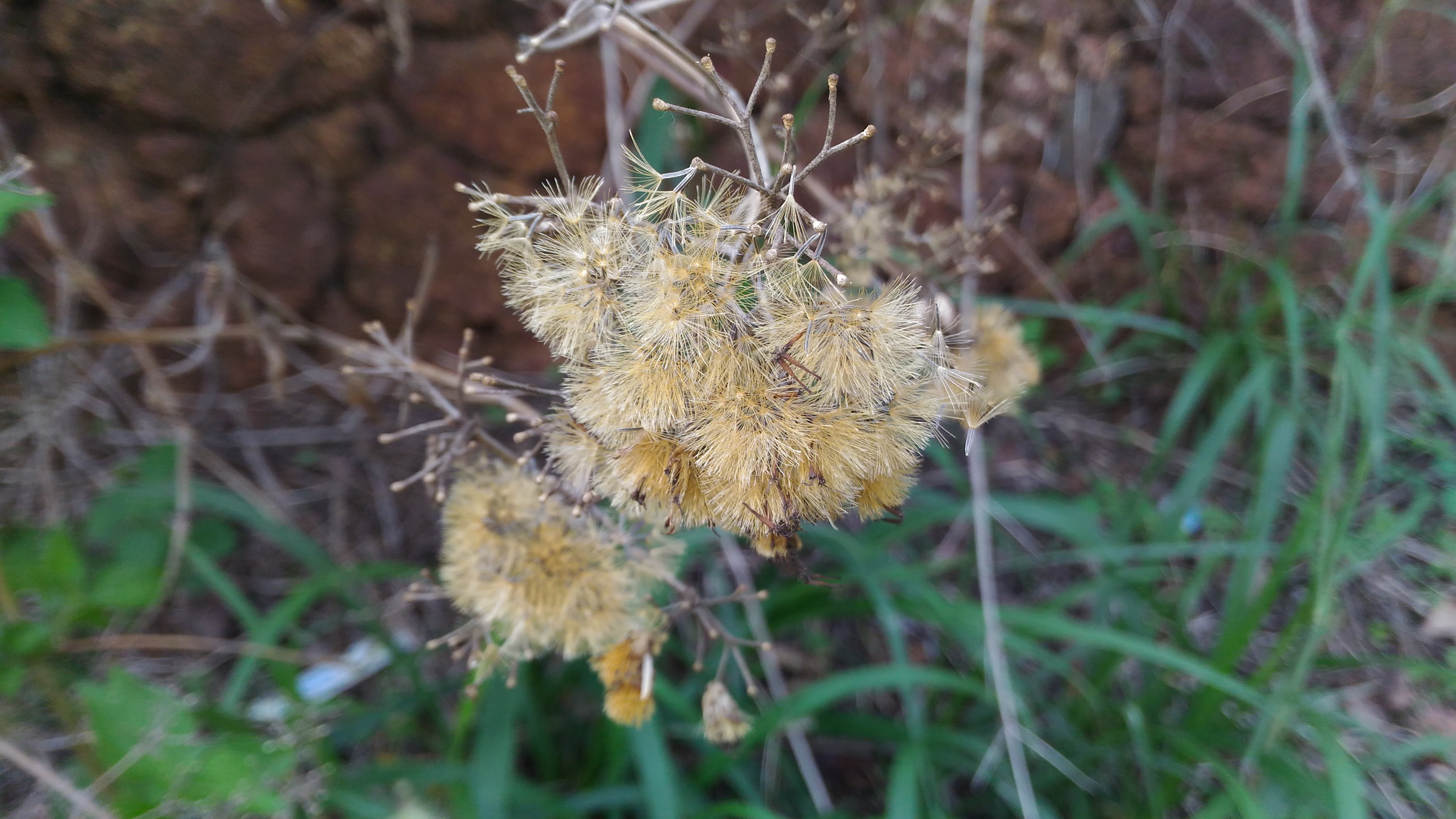
Seeds ready to be dispersed

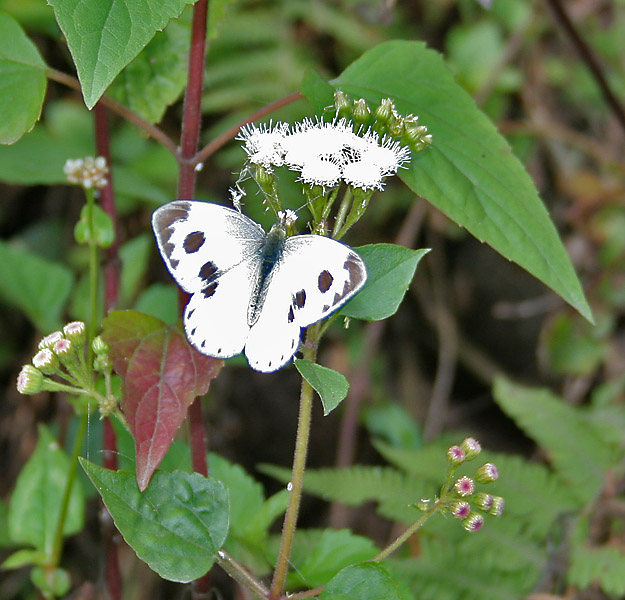
Indian cabbage white (Pieris canidia) on C. odorata, India

== See also ==
- John Wyndham's The Day of the Triffids— the post-apocalyptic novel from which the plant receives one of its colloquial names
