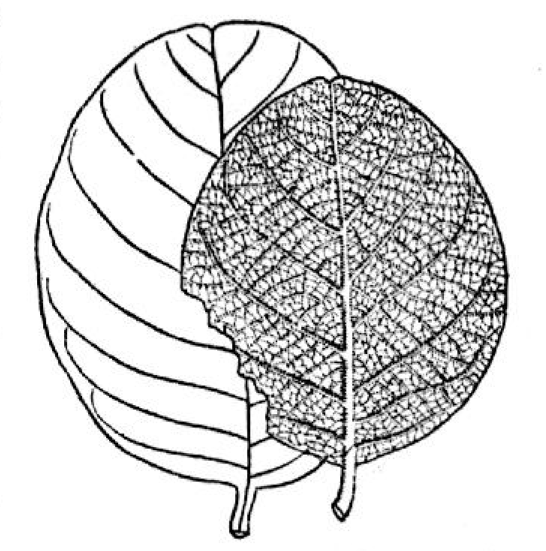
- Botanical illustration of Annona crassivenia leaf

Conservation status
- Endangered (IUCN 3.1)

Scientific classification
- Kingdom: Plantae
- Clade: Tracheophytes
- Clade: Angiosperms
- Clade: Magnoliids
- Order: Magnoliales
- Family: Annonaceae
- Genus: Annona
- Species: A. crassivenia

Binomial name
- Annona crassivenia Saff.

= Annona crassivenia =

Species of flowering plant

Annona crassivenia is a species of flowering plant in the family Annonaceae. It is a shrub or tree endemic to Cuba. William Edwin Safford, the American botanist who first formally described the species in 1914, named it after the thick (crassus in Latin) tertiary veins (vena in Latin) that interconnect the secondary veins of its leaves.

== Description ==
It is a tree. Its mature hairless gray-brown branches and lenticels. Its oval leaves are 5.5-7.8 by 4.5-7 centimeters and have rounded or notched tips. The mature leaves are hairless or sparsely hairy on their upper surface, the lower surface has rust-colored hairs on its veins. The leaves have 9-11 pairs of secondary veins emanating from their midribs and distinctly thick tertiary veins interconnecting the secondary veins. Its petioles 4-5 millimeters long, covered in rust-colored hair, and have a groove on their upper side. Its inflorescences consist of solitary flowers on peduncles that are 10-13 millimeters long and covered in rust-colored hairs. The peduncles are subtended by a wooly bracteole. Its small sepals are fused at their base to form a 4 millimeter wide calyx. It has 6 petals arranged in two rows. The outer petals are 24 by 4 millimeters and taper to a pointed tip. The outer surface of the outer petals is covered in pale red hairs and the inner surface is covered in fine gray hairs. The short inner petals are up to 1.3 millimeters long and covered in red wooly hairs. Its flowers have numerous stamens that are 1.3 millimeters long, with brown filaments and anthers that are 0.85 millimeters long. The tissue connecting the lobes of the anthers form a round cap. Its flowers have numerous carpels that are crowded together for form a cone. Its ovaries are 0.85 millimeters, covered straight, white ascending hairs. Its oblong styles are tapered and are topped by stigmas with a ventral suture. Its immature oval fruit are 4.3 by 4.1 centimeters and covered in rust-colored wooly hairs. Its fruit have numerous seeds that are 6 by 11 millimeters with a thin shell.

=== Reproductive biology ===
The pollen of Annona crassivenia is shed as permanent tetrads.
