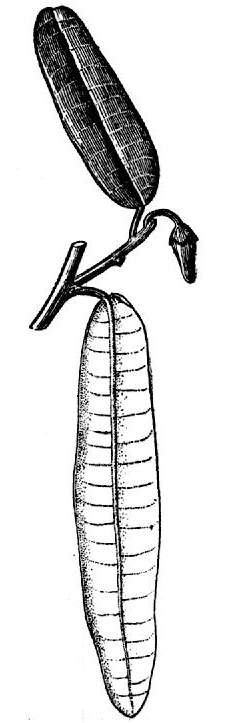

Conservation status
- Vulnerable (IUCN 3.1)

Scientific classification
- Kingdom: Plantae
- Clade: Tracheophytes
- Clade: Angiosperms
- Clade: Magnoliids
- Order: Magnoliales
- Family: Annonaceae
- Genus: Annona
- Species: A. sclerophylla

Binomial name
- Annona sclerophylla Saff.

Synonyms
- Annona sulcata Urb.

= Annona sclerophylla =

Species of plant

Annona sclerophylla is a species of plant in the family Annonaceae. It is a shrub endemic to eastern Cuba.<ref"Annona sclerophylla Saff". Plants of the World Online. The Trustees of the Royal Botanic Gardens, Kew. n.d.</ref> William Edwin Safford, the American botanist who first formally described the species in 1914, named it after its rigidly hard leaves (Latinized forms of Greek σκληρός, sklērós, and φύλλον, phúllon).

== Description ==
It is a bush reaching 2 to 3 meters in height. It has crowded branches. Its rigid oblong leaves are 3–5.5 centimeters long, 8–11 millimeters wide, and have rounded tips which are sometimes capped with a slender point. The leaves are aromatic and smell of nutmeg. The margins of leaves are usually rolled downward. The leaves are shiny and hairless on their upper surface, and densely covered in tawny felt-like hairs on their lower surface except on the midrib. The leaves have 16–18 secondary veins emanating at 90° angles from each side of their midrib and curving back toward the petiole at their apex. Its petioles are 3.5 by 1.5–2 millimeters, covered in reddish woolly hairs, and have a groove on their upper surface. Its solitary flowers are on solitary, extra-axillary peduncles that are 5–13 millimeters long. Its peduncles are covered in small rust-colored hairs and have 1–2 oval bracteoles near their base. Its sepals are united to form a calyx with 3 lobes that are 10 by 10 millimeters and come to a point. Its flowers have 3 thick petals with margins that touch but are not united. It has numerous stamens. The tissue connecting the lobes of the anthers is expanded to form a hood. It has numerous carpels that form a conical gynoecium.

=== Reproductive biology ===
The pollen of Annona sclerophylla is shed as permanent tetrads.

=== Habitat and distribution ===
It has been observed growing at elevations of 680 – 1000 meters above sea level.
