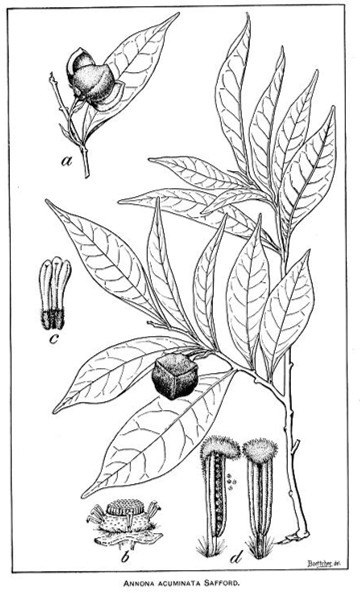
- Scientific illustration of Annona acuminata

Conservation status
- Least Concern (IUCN 3.1)

Scientific classification
- Kingdom: Plantae
- Clade: Tracheophytes
- Clade: Angiosperms
- Clade: Magnoliids
- Order: Magnoliales
- Family: Annonaceae
- Genus: Annona
- Species: A. acuminata

Binomial name
- Annona acuminata Saff.

= Annona acuminata =

Species of flowering plant

Annona acuminata is a species of plant in the Annonaceae family. It is native to Panama and Colombia. William Edwin Safford, the American botanist who first formally described the species, named it after the tapering (acuminatus in Latin) tips of its leaves.

== Description ==
It is a tree reaching 5 to 7 meters in height. Its branches have numerous red-brown lenticels. Its oblong, membranous leaves are 6.5-8 by 1.8-2.2 centimeters and smooth on both surfaces. Its leaves taper to a distinctive tip which at its apex is rounded. The leaves have 10-12 pairs of secondary veins emanating from its midrib. Its petioles are 1.5-3 millimeters long. Flowers are solitary on 16-16 millimeter long peduncles. The peduncles, which are extra-axillary, have two distinctive, 2-4 millimeter long bracteoles, one at their base, and one near their middle. Its sepals are partially fused to form a broad-based calyx with three triangular tips. The outside of the calyx is hairy and the inside has stiff rust-colored hairs at its base. Its flowers have numerous 2.5 millimeter long stamens. Its flowers numerous ovaries arranged in a disc, each with a 1.5 millimeter long, club-shaped style. Its round, spiny fruit is 2-2.5 centimeters in diameter. Its yellow seeds are 7-8 millimeters long.

=== Reproductive biology ===
The bright orange-yellow pollen of Annona acuminata is shed as permanent tetrads.

=== Uses ===
Extracts of bioactive molecules from its tissues have been reported to contain aporphine derivatives.
