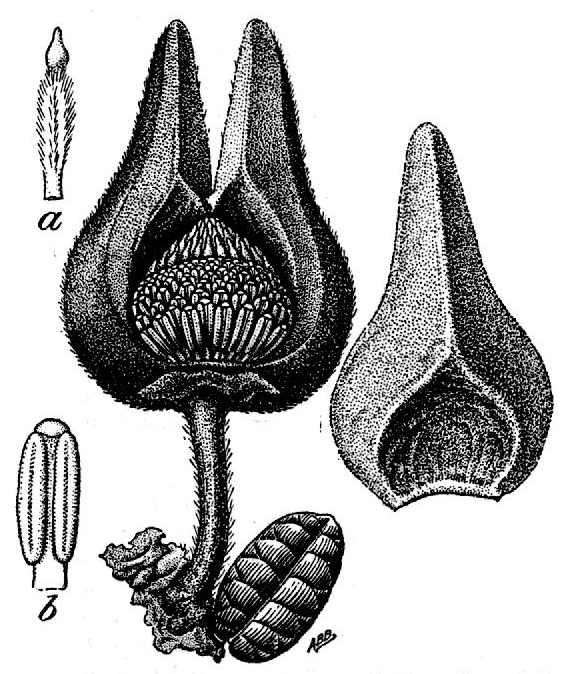
- Botanical illustration of Annona cascarilloides flower

Conservation status
- Endangered (IUCN 3.1)

Scientific classification
- Kingdom: Plantae
- Clade: Tracheophytes
- Clade: Angiosperms
- Clade: Magnoliids
- Order: Magnoliales
- Family: Annonaceae
- Genus: Annona
- Species: A. cascarilloides

Binomial name
- Annona cascarilloides Griseb.

Synonyms
- Annona elliptica R.E.Fr.

= Annona cascarilloides =

Species of flowering plant

Annona cascarilloides is a species of flowering plant in the Annonaceae family. It is a shrub endemic to western Cuba. According to William Edwin Safford, the species was named it after the pattern of its leaf veins which resemble species of a different genus, that at the time Safford was writing was called Cascarilla, but is now synonymous with the genera Croton and Ladenbergia. Despite this assertion by Safford, August Grisebach, the German botanist who first formally described the species, makes no mention of Cascarilla in his 1866 entry.

== Description ==
It is bush reaching 2 meters in height. Its leaves are 2.5-3.7 by 0.6-0.8 centimeters. The tips of the leaves end abruptly in a small point. The leaf margins are rolled under. The mature leaves are hairless on their upper and lower surfaces. The leaves have 13-15 secondary veins that branch from the midrib at near 90° angles and fork before terminating. Its inflorescences consist of solitary flowers on peduncles that are 5-7 millimeters long. Its sepals are united at their base to form a calyx with 3 triangular lobes that are 2.4 by 2.4 millimeters and covered in rust-colored hairs on their outer surface. It has two rows of petals. Its thick, oval outer petals are 6-7 by 12-20 millimeters, have a long tapering point and are hollowed at their base. The outer petals are fine rust-colored hair on their outer surface and are hairless on their inner surface. Its flowers have numerous stamens that are 1.6 millimeters long. Its flowers have numerous 1.6 millimeter long carpels that are crowded together for form a cone. Its ovaries are covered with pale red hairs and are capped by tapering, fleshy styles. Its round, hairless fruit are 3-3.5 centimeters in diameter and have thin skins and soft pulpy flesh. Its brown, shiny, oblong, wrinkly seeds are 8 by 12-16 millimeters and have a think shell.

=== Reproductive biology ===
The pollen of Annona cascarilloides is shed as permanent tetrads.

=== Distribution and habitat ===
Grows on the western side of the island and flowers in June.
