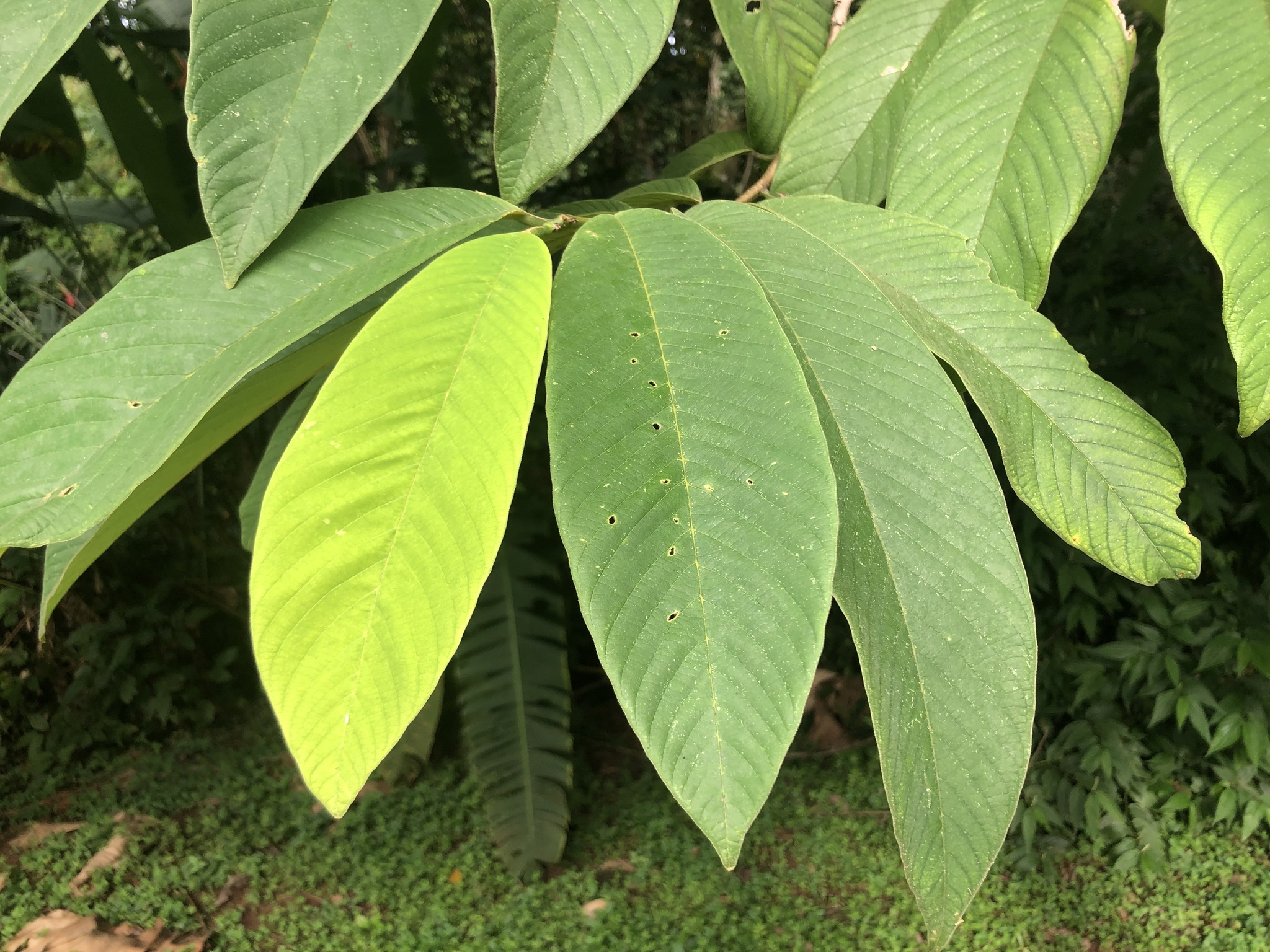

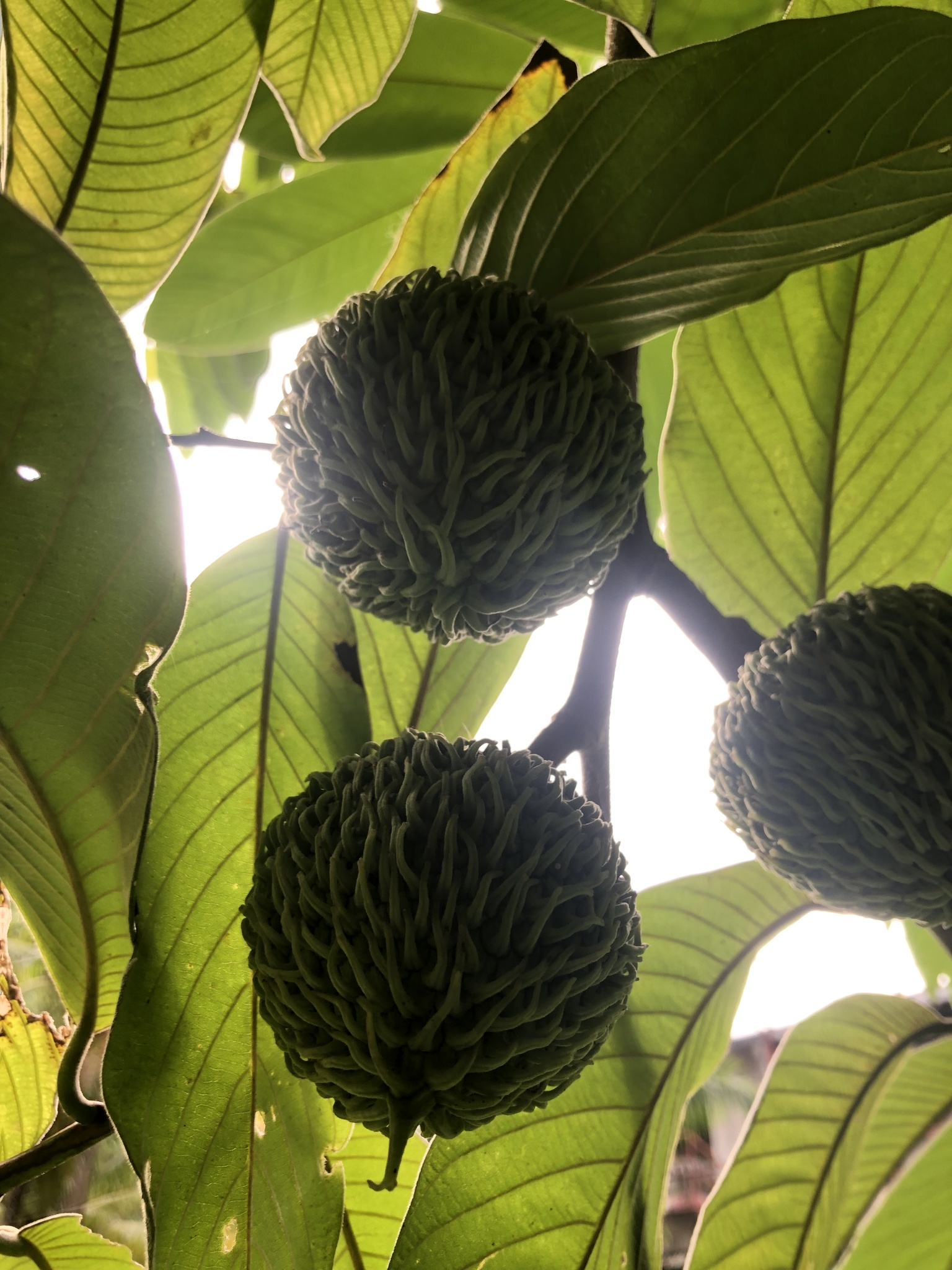

Conservation status
- Near Threatened (IUCN 3.1)

Scientific classification
- Kingdom: Plantae
- Clade: Tracheophytes
- Clade: Angiosperms
- Clade: Magnoliids
- Order: Magnoliales
- Family: Annonaceae
- Genus: Annona
- Species: A. spraguei

Binomial name
- Annona spraguei Saff.

= Annona spraguei =

Species of flowering plant

Annona spraguei is a species of flowering plant in the Annonaceae family. It is a tree native to Colombia, Panama, and Chiapas in southeastern Mexico. It is a small to medium-sized tree which grows in lowland tropical rain forest. It is threatened by habitat loss. Its pollen is shed as permanent tetrads.
