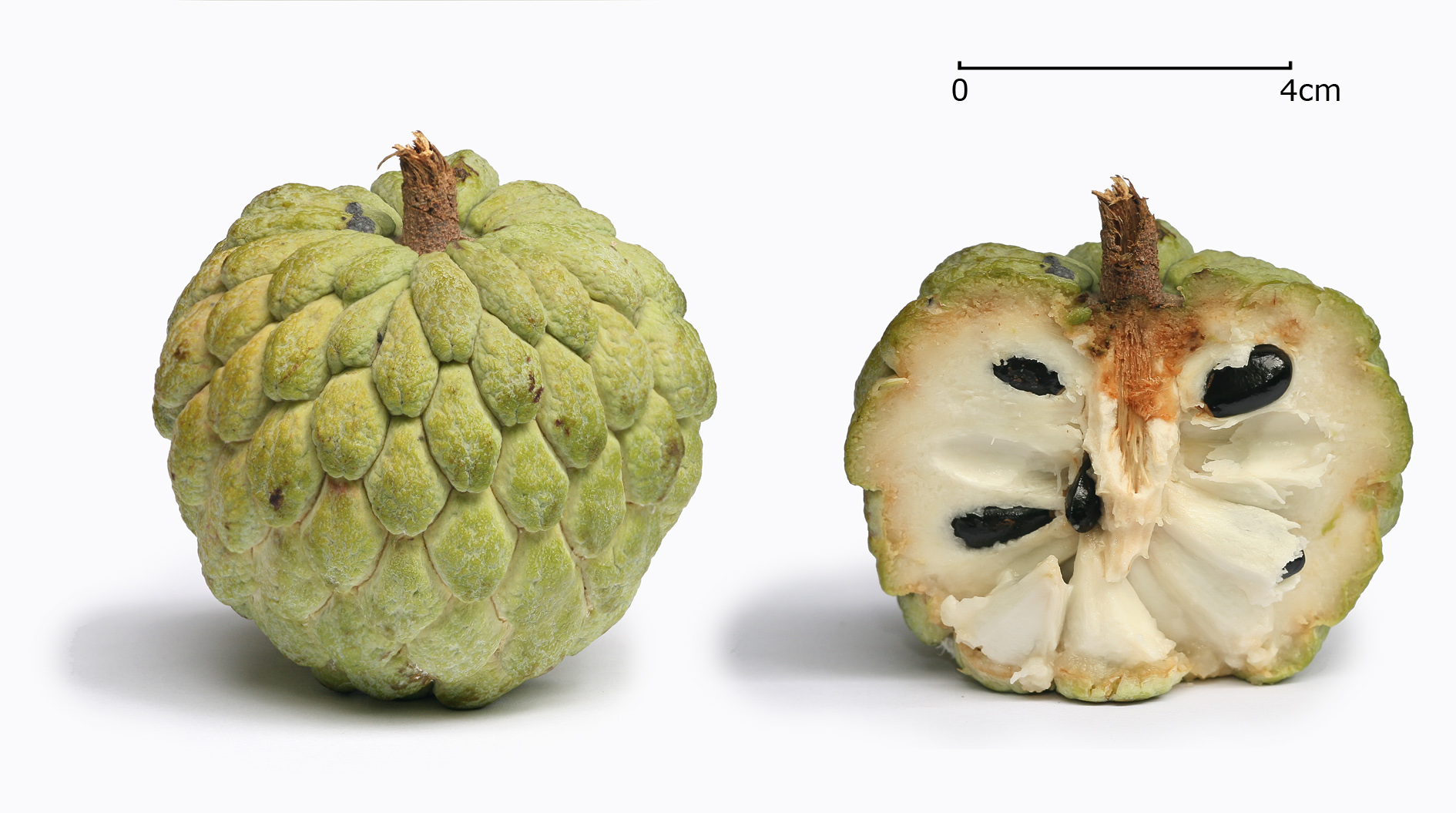
- Annona squamosa
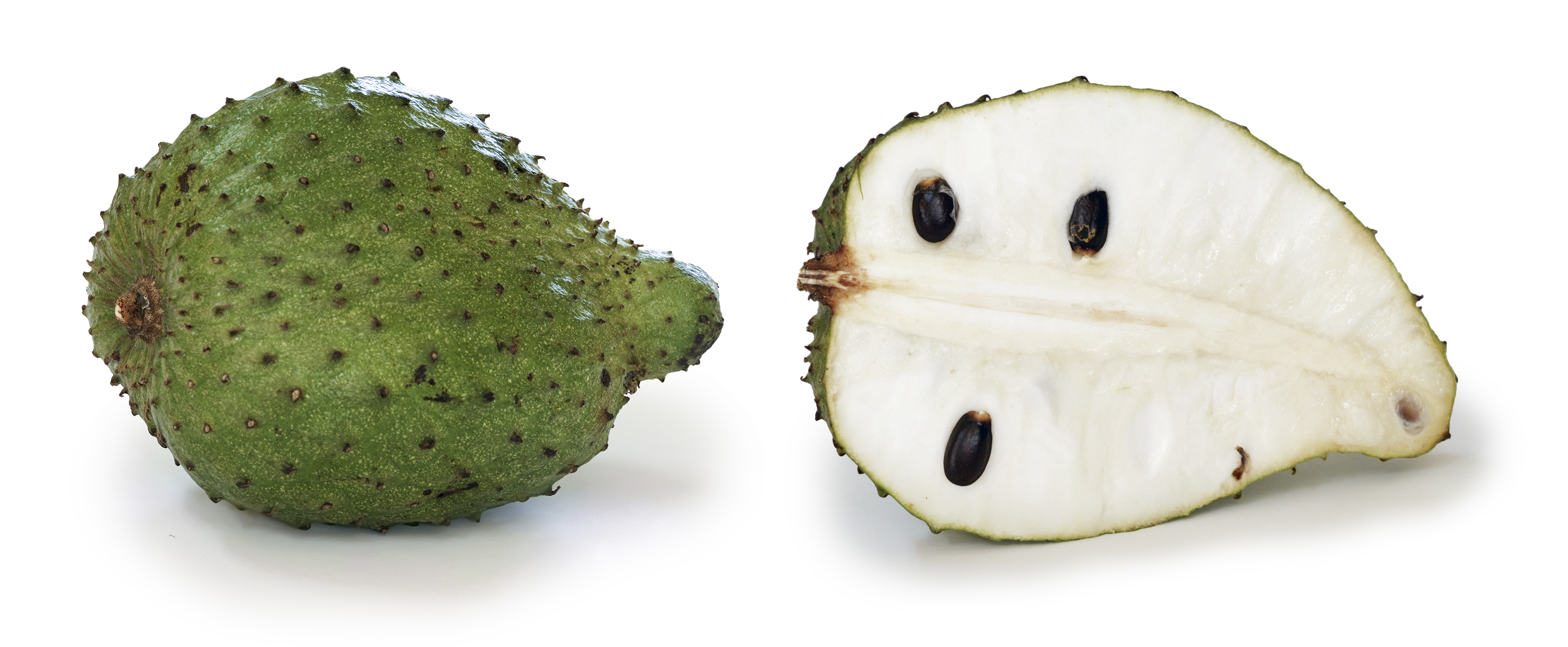
- Annona muricata

Scientific classification
- Kingdom: Plantae
- Clade: Embryophytes
- Clade: Tracheophytes
- Clade: Spermatophytes
- Clade: Angiosperms
- Clade: Magnoliids
- Order: Magnoliales
- Family: Annonaceae
- Subfamily: Annonoideae
- Tribe: Annoneae
- Genus: Annona; L.

Type species
- Annona muricata

Species
- Some 169 (see text)

Synonyms
- Guanabanus Mill.; Raimondia Saff.; Rollinia A.St.-Hil.; Rolliniopsis Saff.

= Annona =

Annona Temporal range: 70.6–0 Ma Late Cretaceous – present

Genus of fruits and plants

Annona or Anona (from Taíno annon) is a genus of flowering plants in the pawpaw/sugar apple family, Annonaceae. It is the second largest genus in the family after Guatteria, containing approximately 166 species of mostly Neotropical and Afrotropical trees and shrubs.

The generic name derives from anón, a Hispaniolan Taíno word for the fruit. Paleoethnobotanical studies have dated Annona exploitation and cultivation in the Yautepec River region of Mexico to approximately 1000 BC. Plants of the genus have several common names, including sugar-apple, soursop, anona, cherimoya and guanábana.

Currently, seven Annona species (A. cherimola, A. muricata, A. squamosa, A. reticulata, A. senegalensis, A. scleroderma, A. purpurea) and one hybrid (the atemoya) are cultivated for domestic or commercial use, mostly for the edible and nutritious fruits; several others such as A. crassiflora and A. salzmannii also produce edible fruits. Many of the species are used in traditional medicines for the treatment of a variety of diseases, though their efficacy has yet to be validated scientifically. Several annonaceous species have been found to contain acetogenins, a class of natural compounds with a wide variety of biological activities. The first complete genome for a species in this genus (Annona muricata) was published in 2021. The earliest fossils have been found in the Lance Formation dating to the Late Cretaceous.

== Description ==
Annona species are taprooted, evergreen or semideciduous, tropical trees or shrubs. The plants typically grow in areas where air temperature does not drop below 28 °F (−2 °C), especially Cuba, Jamaica, Central America, India the Philippines and Calabria (southern Italy). However, they have also been known to grow in certain parts of the Andes mountains in South America and in Florida.

The woody trunks have thin bark that has broad and shallow depressions or fissures which join together and are scaly, giving rise to slender, stiff, cylindrical, and tapering shoots with raised pores and naked buds. Leaf blades can be leathery or thin and rather soft or pliable, bald or hairy.

The flowering stalks rise from axils, or occasionally from axillary buds on main stems or older stems, or as solitary flowers or small bundles of flowers. Usually, the three or four deciduous sepals are smaller than the outer petals that do not overlap while in bud. Six to eight fleshy petals are arranged in two whorls—the petals of the outer whorl are larger and do not overlap; inner petals are ascending and distinctively smaller, and nectar glands are darker pigmented. The numerous stamens are ball-shaped, club-shaped, or curved and hooded or pointed beyond anther sac. Numerous pistils, attached directly to the base, are partially united to various degrees with a distinct stigma, with one or two ovules per pistil; the style and stigma are club-shaped or narrowly conic.

One fleshy, ovate to spherical fruit is produced per flower. Each fruit consists of many individual small fruits or syncarps, with one syncarp and seed per pistil. Seeds are bean-like with tough coats; the seed kernels are toxic.

Pollination occurs via Dynastid scarab beetles, which appear to be basic generalists within the genus Annona. Those species of Annona which are more morphologically derived, as well as all Rollinia spp., possess reduced floral chambers and attract small beetles such as Nitidulidae or Staphylinidae.

== Toxicology ==
Annonacin is a neurotoxin found in Annona muricata seeds.

The compound annonacin and dozens of other acetogenins contained in the seeds and fruit of some members of Annonaceae such as Annona muricata (soursop) are neurotoxins and are one of the causes of a Parkinson-like neurodegenerative disease. The only group of people known to be affected by this disease live on the Caribbean island of Guadeloupe and the problem presumably occurs with the consumption of plants containing annonacin. The disorder is a so-called tauopathy associated with a pathologic accumulation of tau protein in the brain. Experimental results published in 2007 demonstrated for the first time that the plant neurotoxin annonacin is responsible for this accumulation.

== Selected species ==
There are 169 accepted Annona species, as of April 2021, according to Plants of the World Online.

- Annona acuminata
- Annona acutiflora
- Annona ambotay
- Annona angustifolia
- Annona asplundiana
- Annona atabapensis
- Annona aurantiaca
- Annona bullata
- Annona cacans – araticum-cagão
- Annona cascarilloides
- Annona cherimola – cherimoya
- Annona chrysophylla – graines
- Annona conica
- Annona cordifolia
- Annona coriacea
- Annona cornifolia
- Annona crassiflora – araticum do cerrado, marolo
- Annona crassivenia
- Annona cristalensis
- Annona cubensis
- Annona deceptrix
- Annona deminuta
- Annona dioica
- Annona diversifolia
- Annona dolichophylla
- Annona ecuadorensis
- Annona ekmanii
- Annona foetida
- Annona fosteri
- Annona glabra – pond apple, alligator apple, monkey apple
- Annona globiflora
- Annona haematantha
- Annona haitiensis
- Annona hypoglauca
- Annona hystricoides
- Annona jahnii
- Annona jamaicensis
- Annona longiflora
- Annona macrocarpa auct.
- Annona macroprophyllata
- Annona manabiensis
- Annona moaensis
- Annona montana Macfad. – mountain soursop
- Annona muricata – soursop, graviola
- Annona nitida
- Annona nutans
- Annona oligocarpa
- Annona paludosa
- Annona papilionella
- Annona pittieri
- Annona praetermissa
- Annona purpurea – soncoya
- Annona reticulata – custard apple, bullock's heart
- Annona rigida
- Annona rosei
- Annona salzmannii – beach sugar apple
- Annona scleroderma – poshe-te, cawesh, wild red custard apple
- Annona sclerophylla
- Annona senegalensis – African custard apple
- Annona sericea
- Annona spraguei
- Annona squamosa – sugar apple, sweetsop
- Annona stenophylla
- Annona tenuiflora
- Annona tomentosa
- Annona trunciflora

=== Hybrids ===
- Annona × atemoya – atemoya

== Insects and diseases ==
Annona species are generally disease-free. They are susceptible to some fungi and wilt. Ants may also be a problem, since they promote mealybugs on the fruit.

Insects

- Braephratiloides cubense (annona seed borer)
- Bepratelloides cubense (annona seed borer)
- Morganella longispina (plumose scale)
- Philephedra n.sp. (Philephedra scale)
- Pseudococcus sp. (mealybugs)
- Xyleborus sp. (ambrosia beetles)
- Ammiscus polygrophoides
- Anastrepha atrox
- Anastrepha barandianae
- Anastrepha bistrigata
- Anastrepha chiclayae
- Anastrepha disticta
- Anastrepha extensa
- Anastrepha fraterculus
- Anastrepha oblicua
- Anastrepha serpentina
- Anastrepha striata
- Anastrepha suspensa
- Apate monachus
- Bactrocera spp.
- Bephrata maculicollis
- Brevipalpus spp.
- Ceratitis capitata
- Cerconota anonella
- Coccoidea spp.
- Coccus viridis (green scale)
- Emanadia flavipennis
- Gelwchiidae spp.
- Heliothrips haemorphoidalis
- Leosynodes elegantales
- Lyonetia spp.
- Oiketicus kirby
- Orthezia olivicola
- Phyllocnistis spp.
- Pinnaspis aspidistrae
- Planococcus citri
- Saissetia nigra
- Talponia spp.
- Tenuipalpidae
- Tetranynchus spp.
- Thrips

Fungi

- Armillaria (oak root fungus)
- Ascochyta cherimolaer
- Athelia rolfsii
- Botryodiplodia theobromae
- Cercospora annonaceae
- Cladosporium carpophilum
- Colletotrichium spp
- Colletotrichium annonicola
- Colletotrichum gloeosporioides
- Diplodia natalensis (dry fruit rot)
- Erythricium salmonicolor
- Fumagina spp
- Fusarium solani
- Gloeosporium spp
- Glomerella cingulata
- Isariopsis anonarum
- Monilia spp
- Nectria episphaeria
- Oidium spp
- Phakopsora cherimolae
- Phomopsis spp
- Phomopsis annonacearum
- Phyllosticta spp
- Phythium spp
- Phytophtora palmivora
- Phytophtora parasitica
- Rhizoctonia noxia
- Rhizoctonia solani
- Rhizoctonia spp
- Rhizopus nigricans
- Rhizopus stolonifer
- Salssetia oleare
- Uredo cherimola
- Verticillium spp (wilt)
- Zignoella annonicola

Nematodes

- Cephalobidae spp.
- Dorylaimidae spp.
- Gracilacus spp.
- Helicotylenchus spp.
- Hemicycliophora spp.
- Hoplolaimidae spp.
- Meloidogyne incognita spp.
- Pratylenchus spp.
- Paratylenchus micoletzky. Rhabditis spp.
- Tylenchorhynchus spp.
- Xiphinema americanum

Algae

- Cephaleuros virescens
- Cephalosporium spp.
- Paecilomyces spp.

Diseases

- Fruit rot

== Images ==
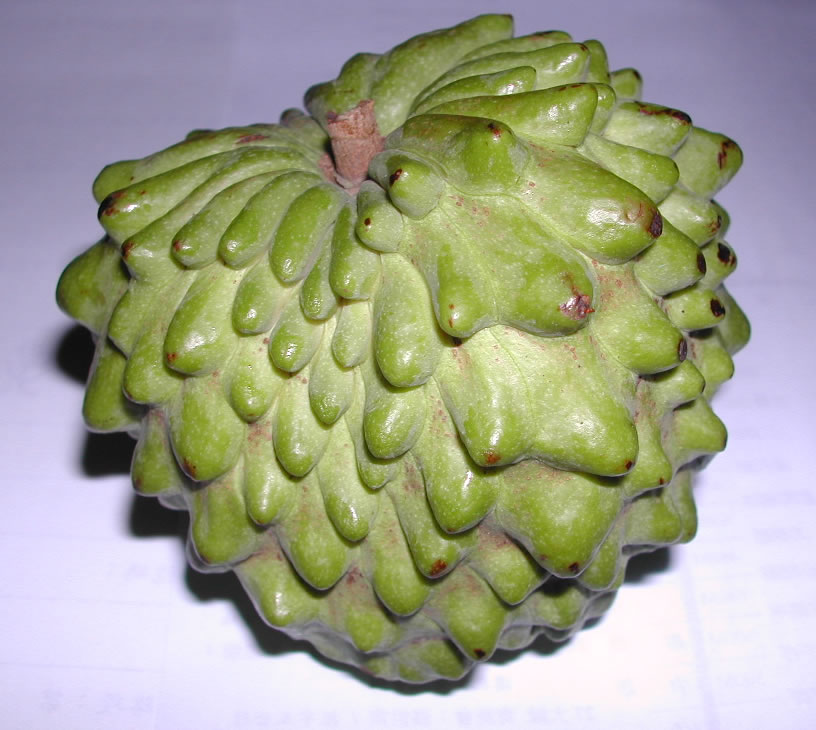
Atemoya (A. cherimola × A. squamosa)

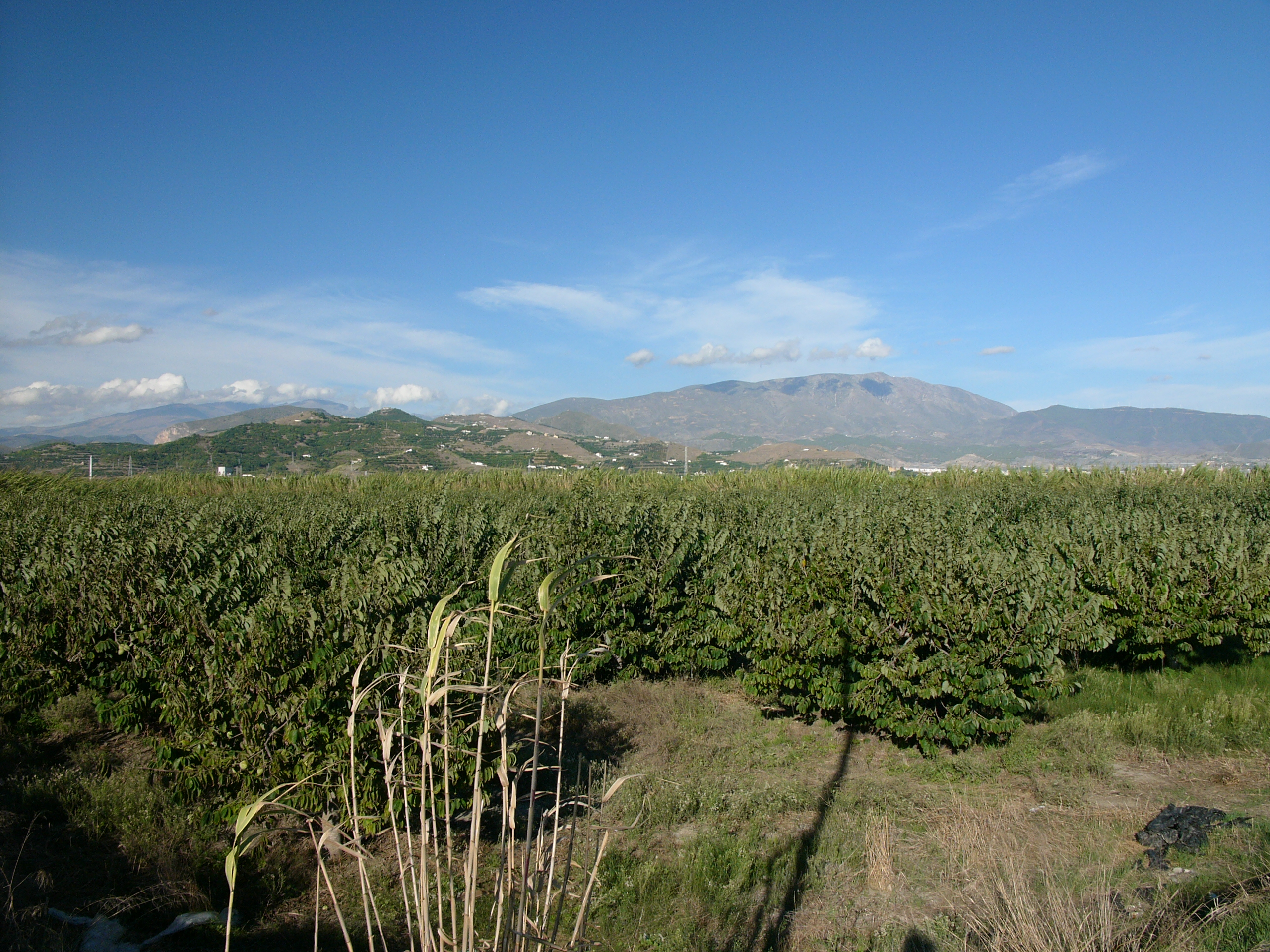
Cherimoya (A. cherimola) plantation

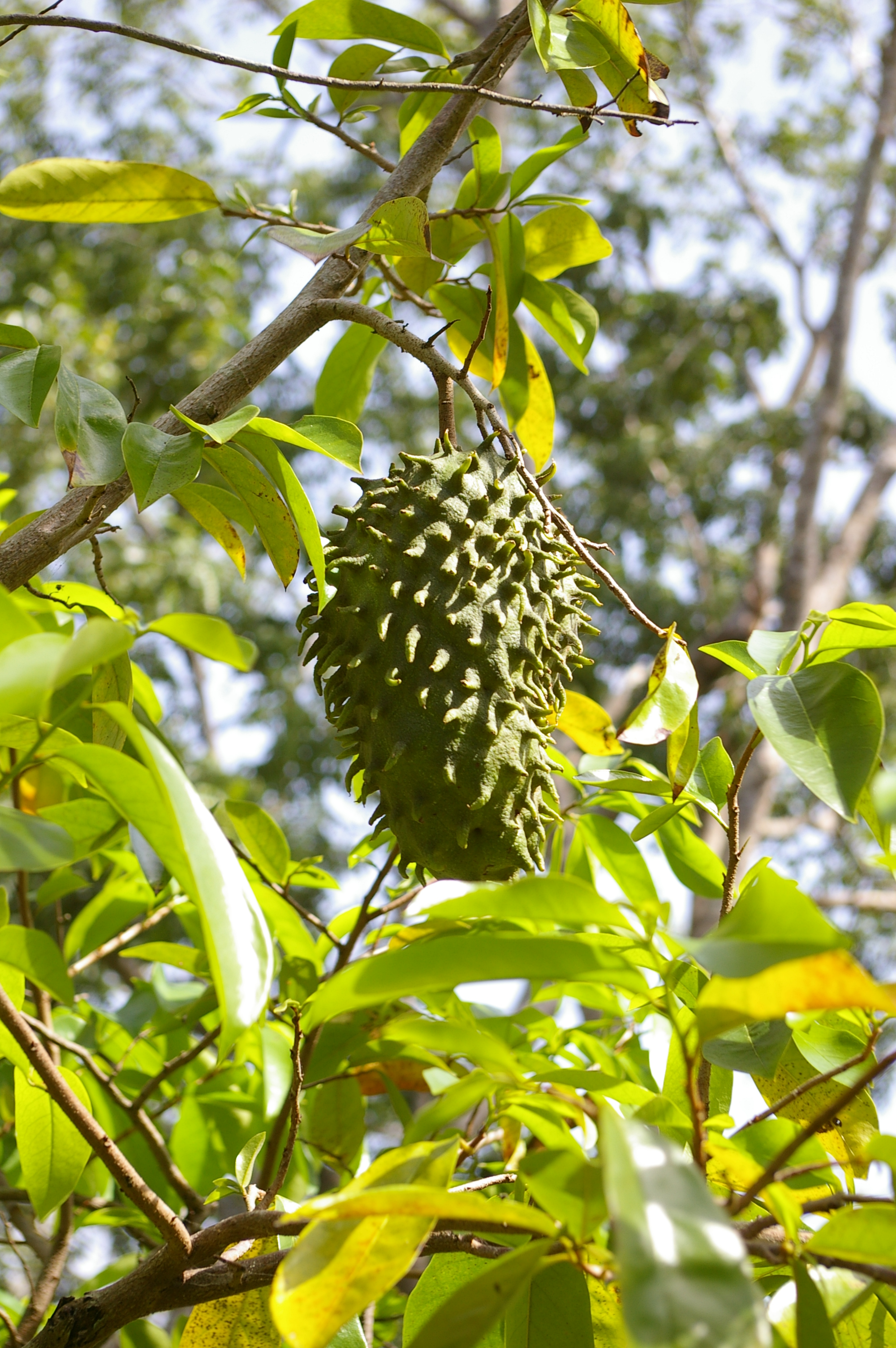
Soursop (A. muricata)

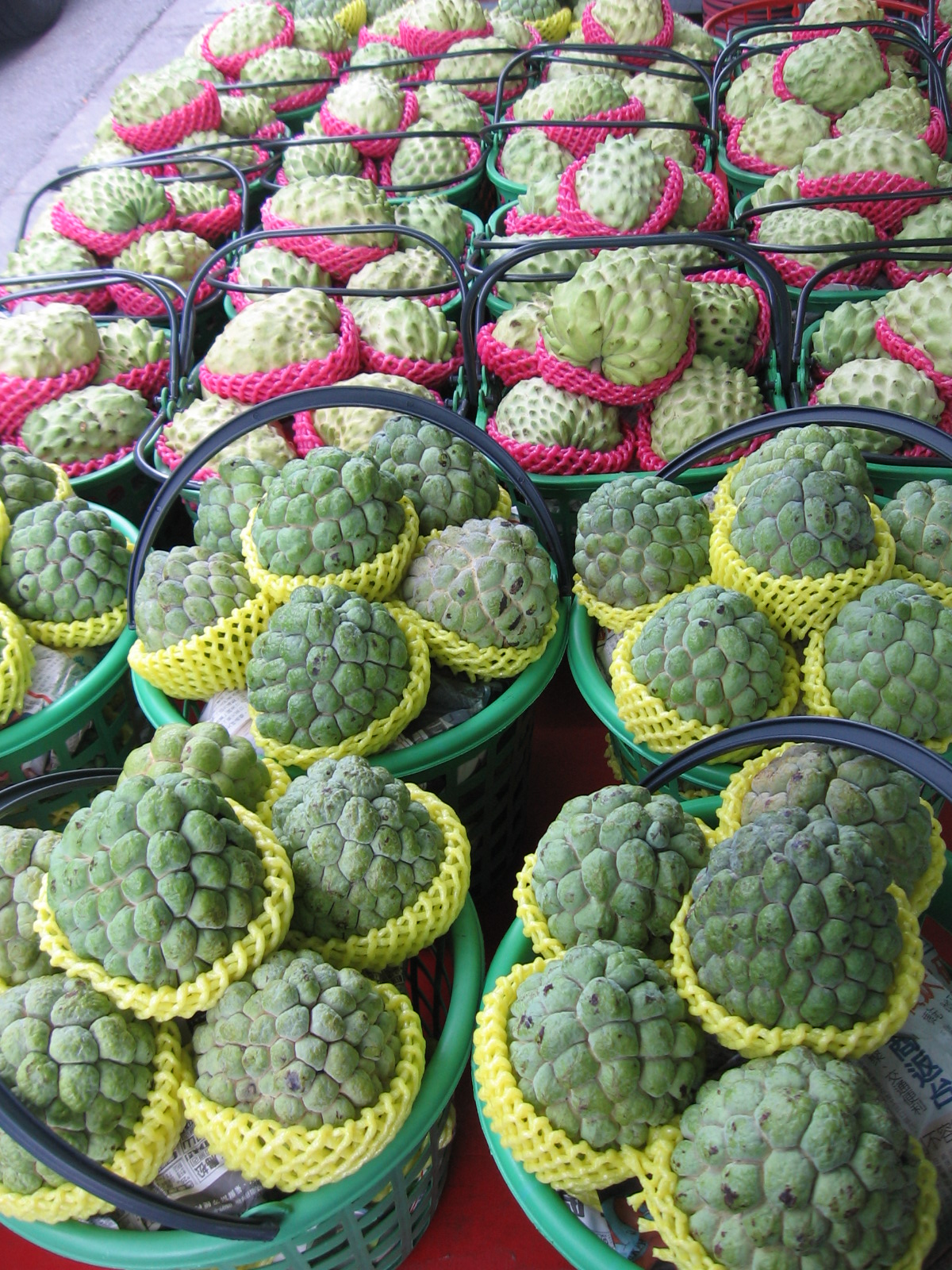
Sugar apples (A. squamosa)

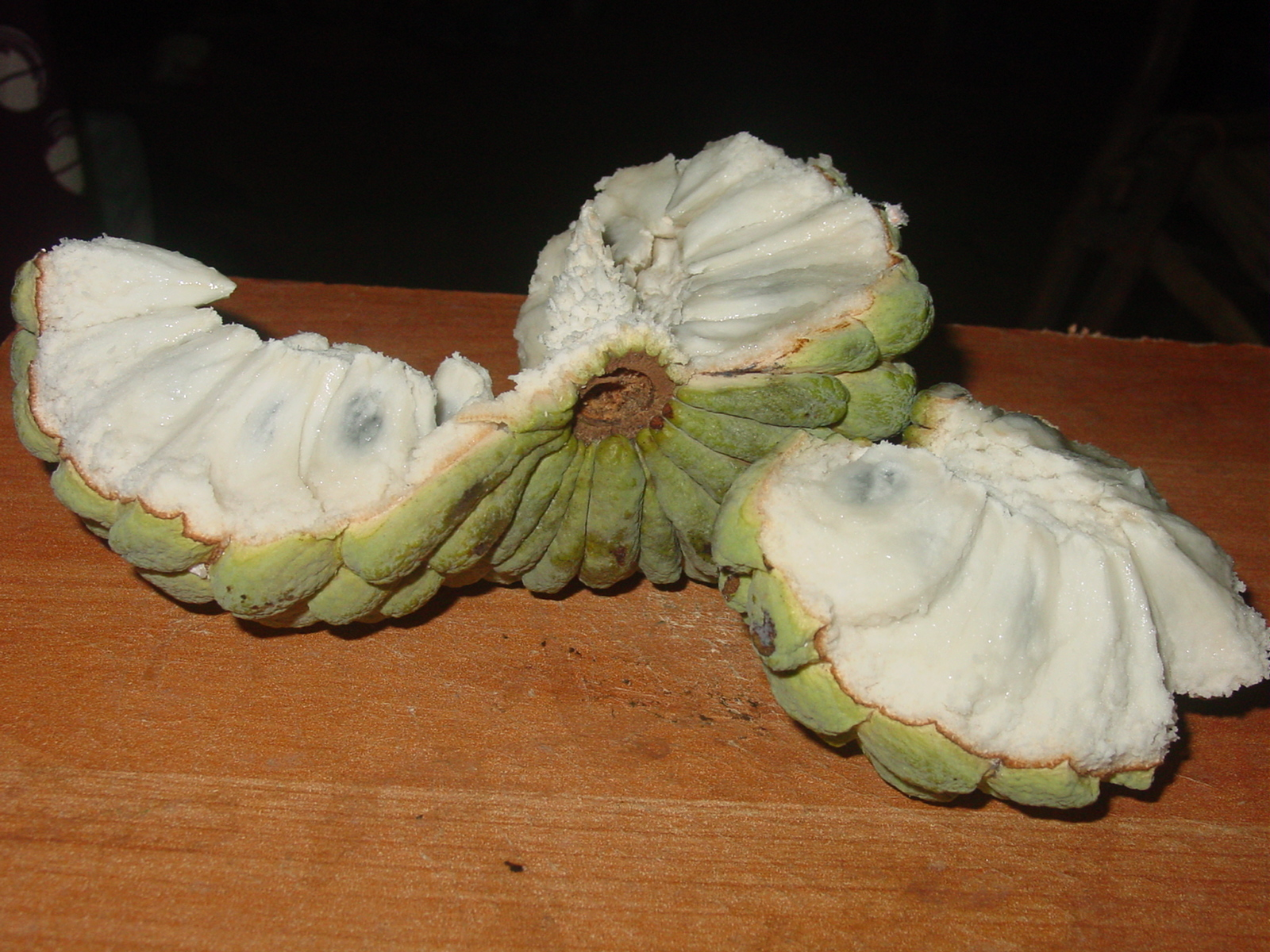
Sugar apple (A. squamosa) interior

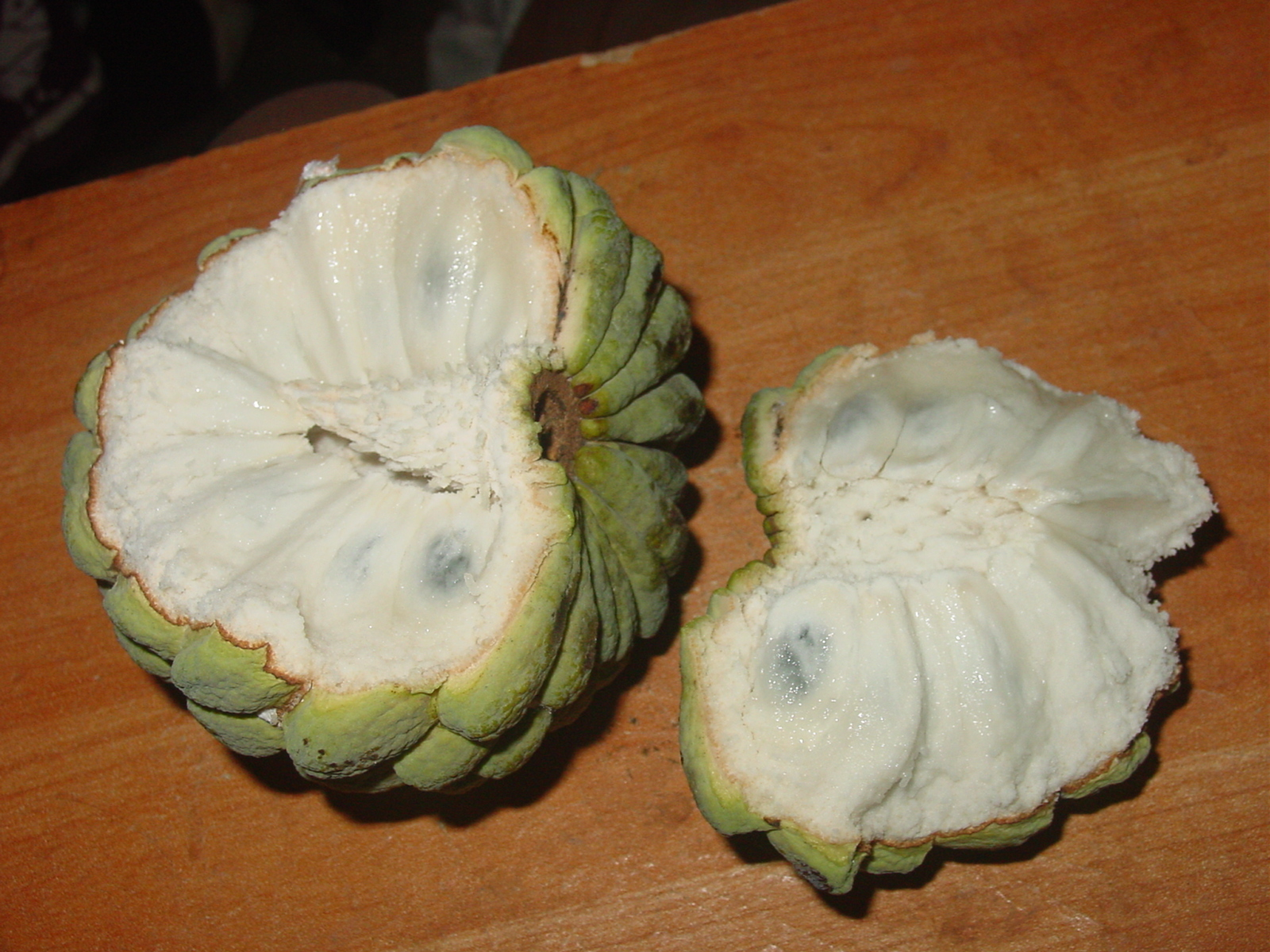
Sugar apple interior

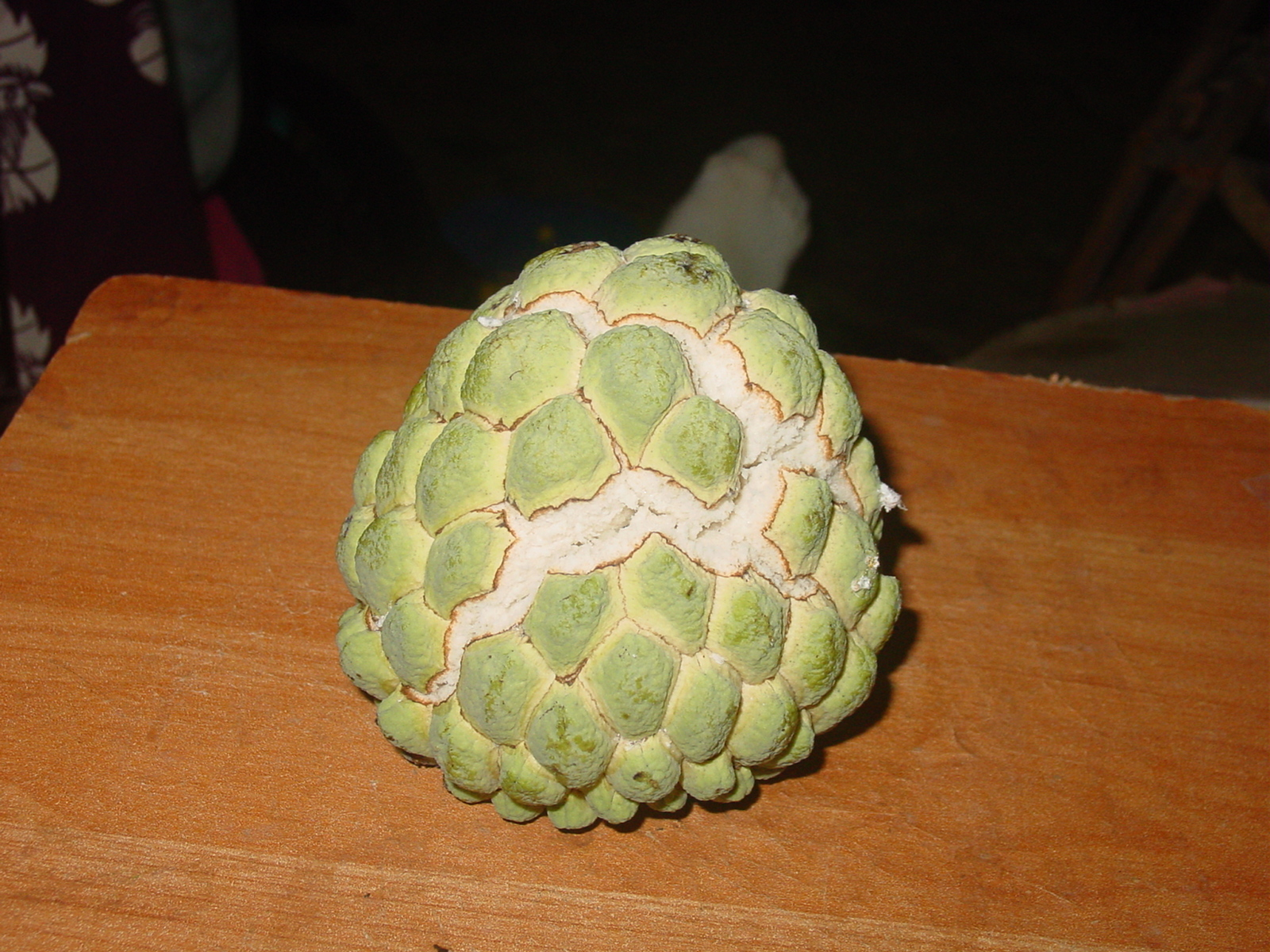
Sugar apple exterior

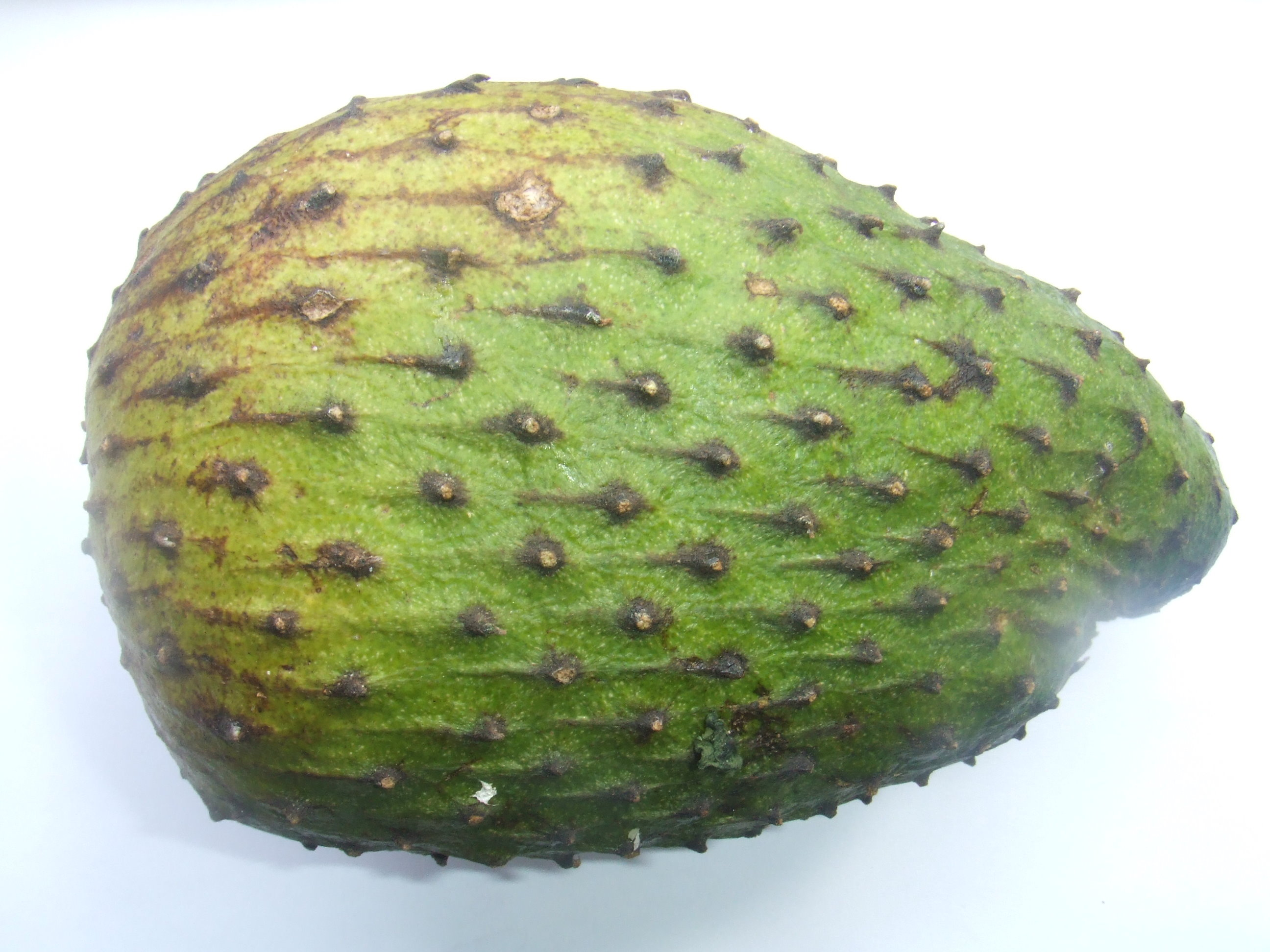
Annona muricata

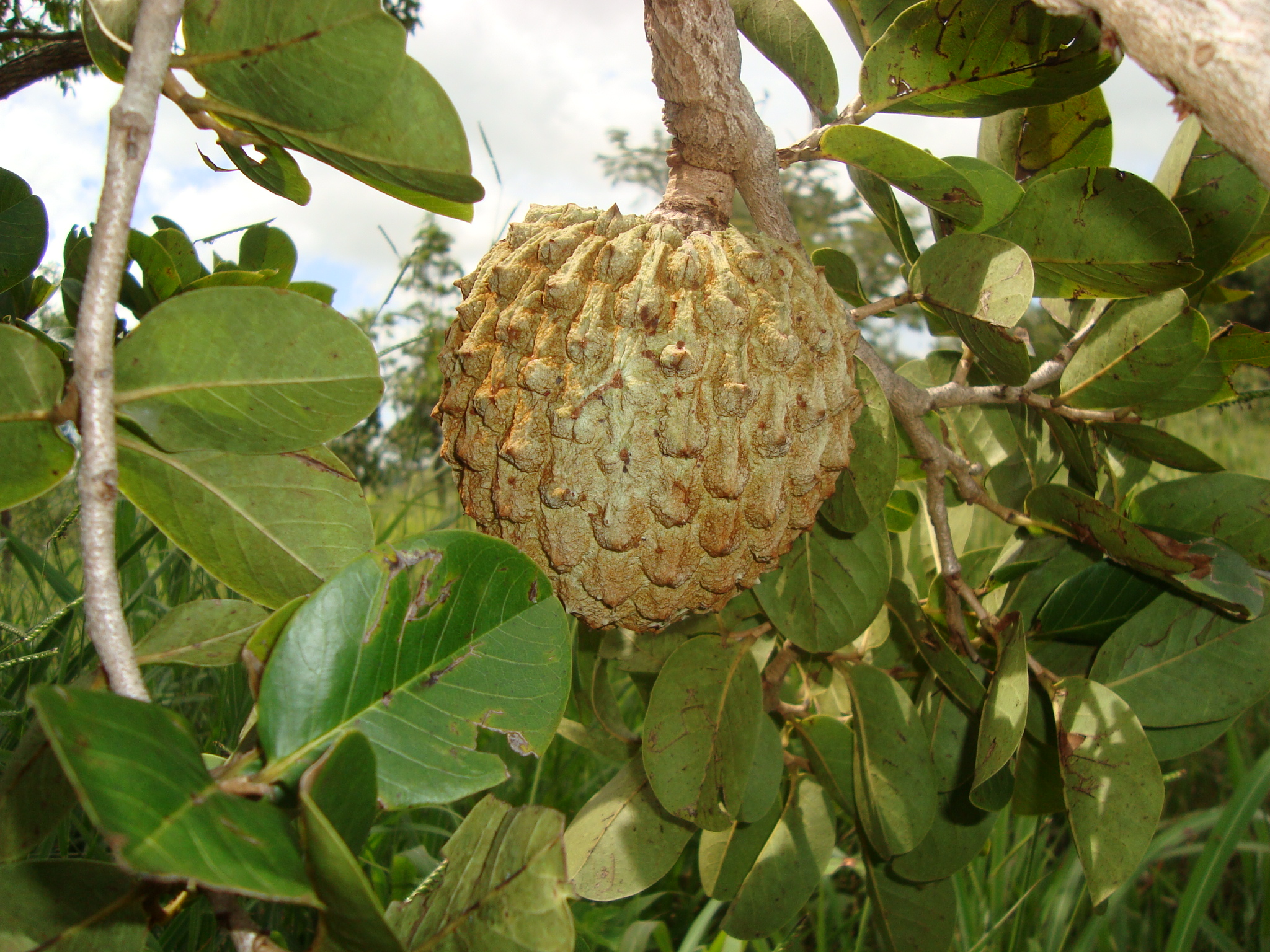
A. crassiflora fruit

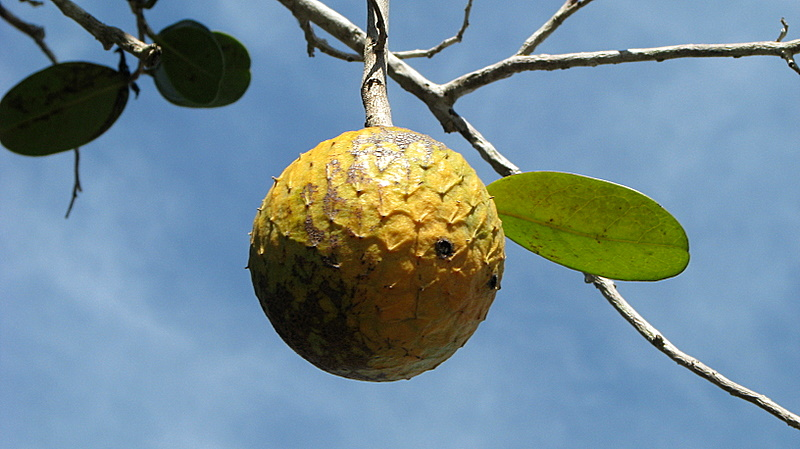
The fruit of A. salzmannii

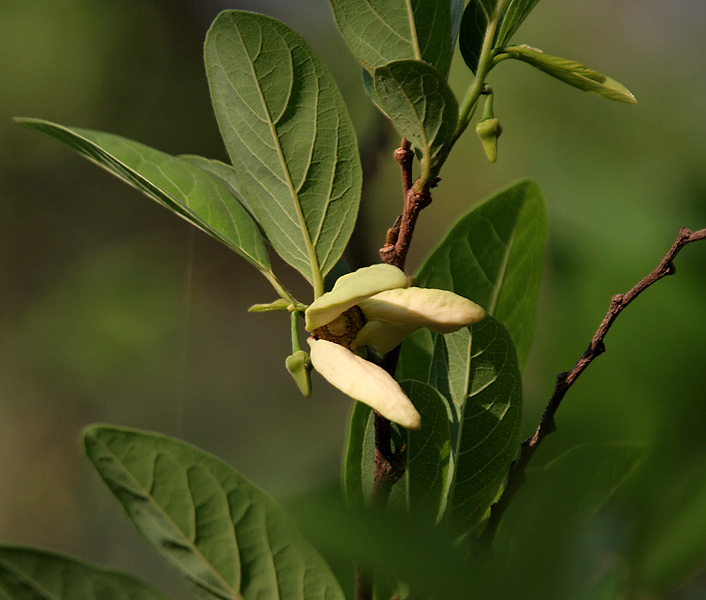
Annona squamosa flower and leaves in Hyderabad, India

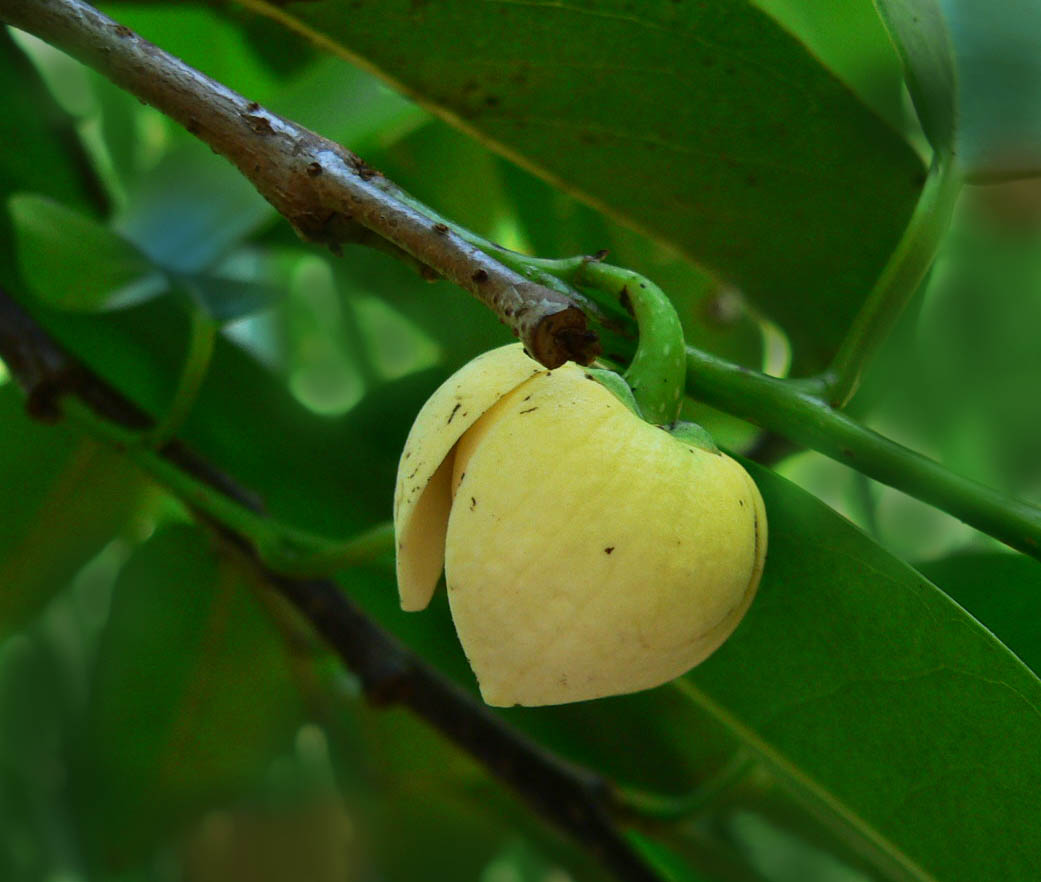
Annona glabra fruit.

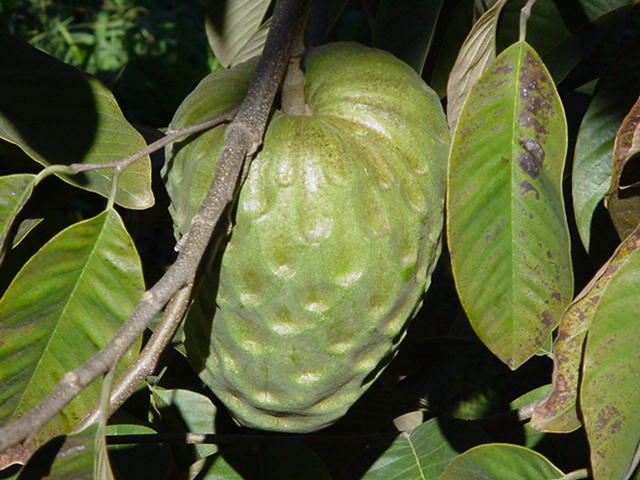
Annona cherimola fruit, Pedra Bela, Brazil

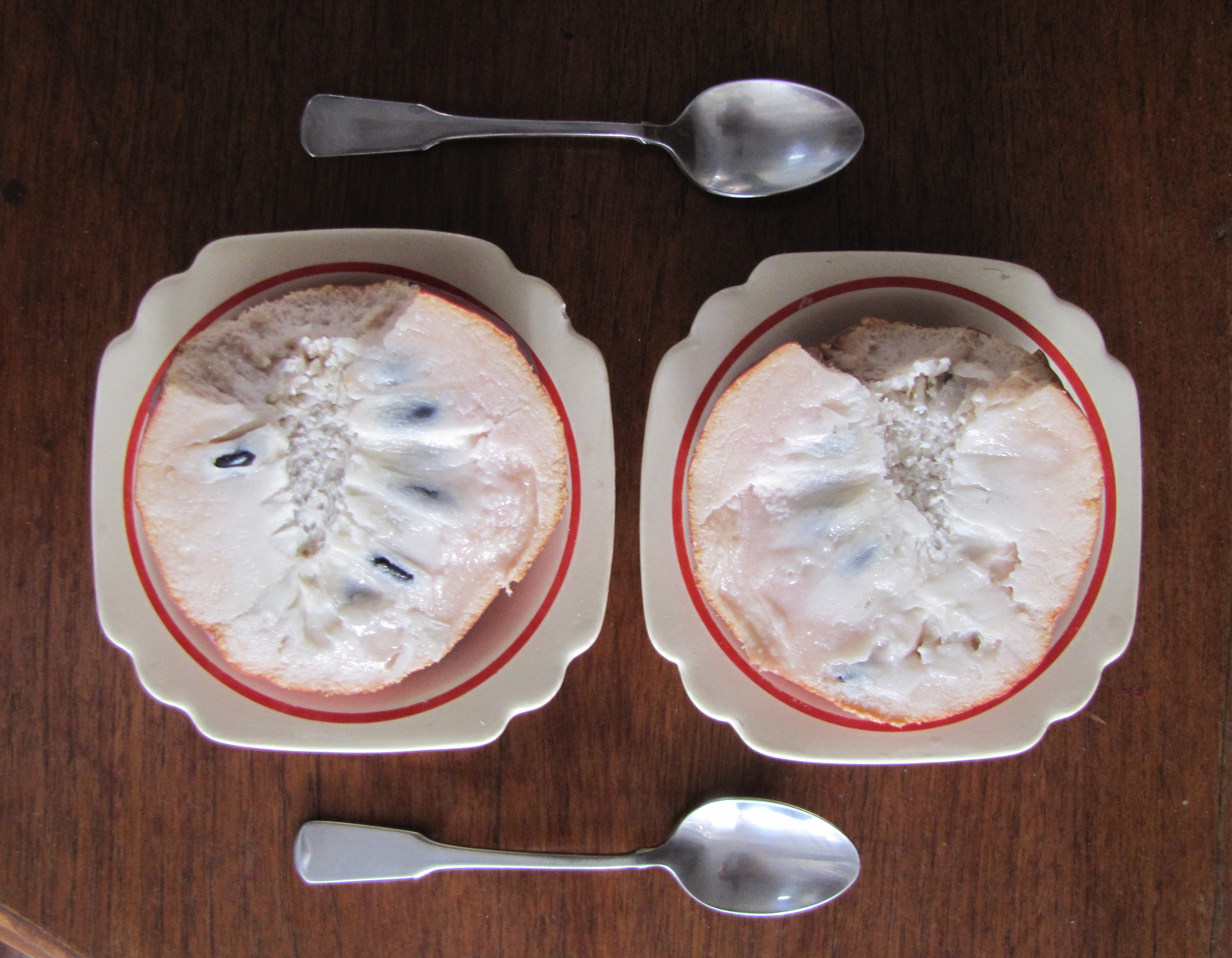
Halved annona fruit

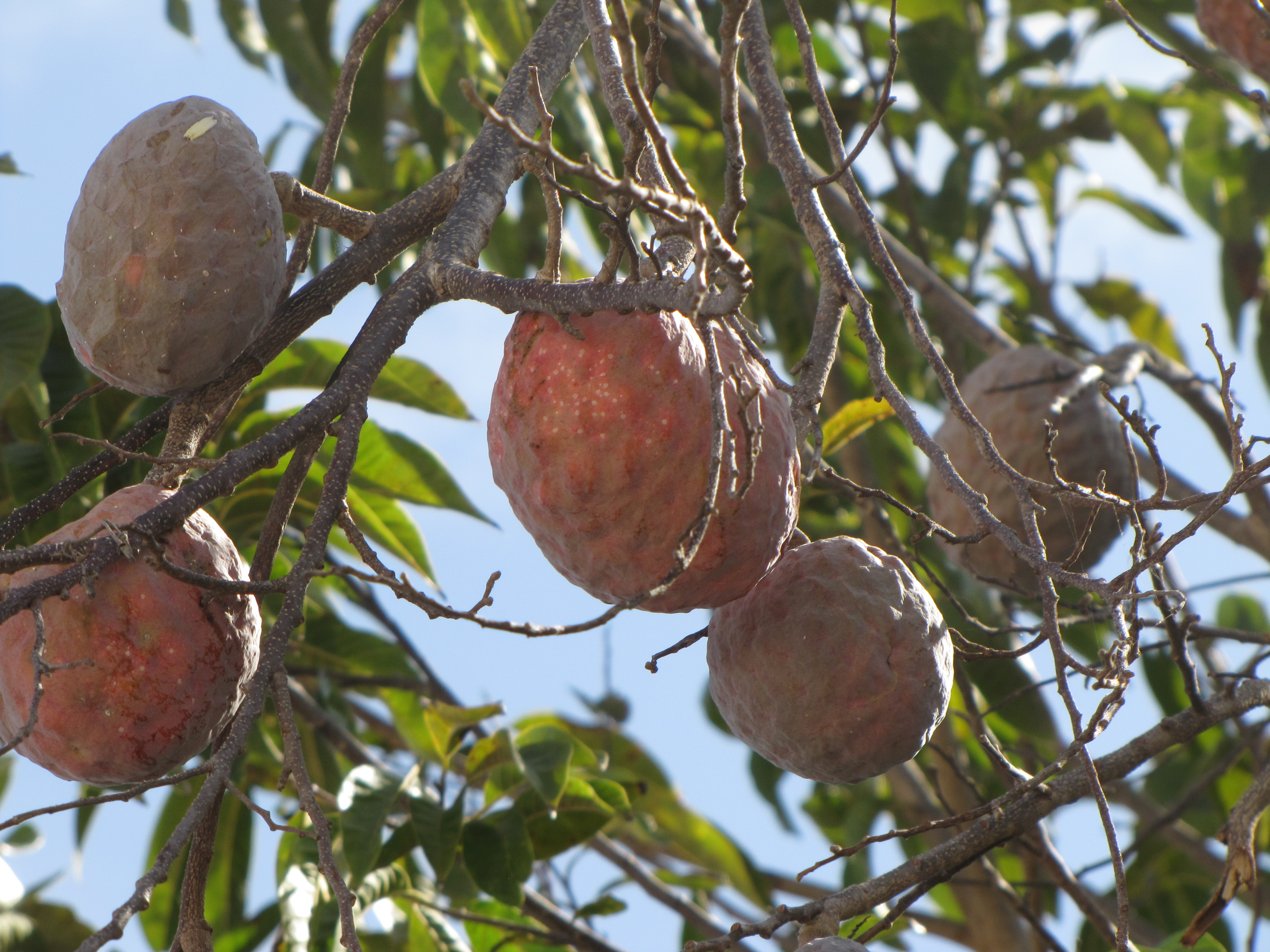
Annona tree, Mérida, Yucatán, Mexico

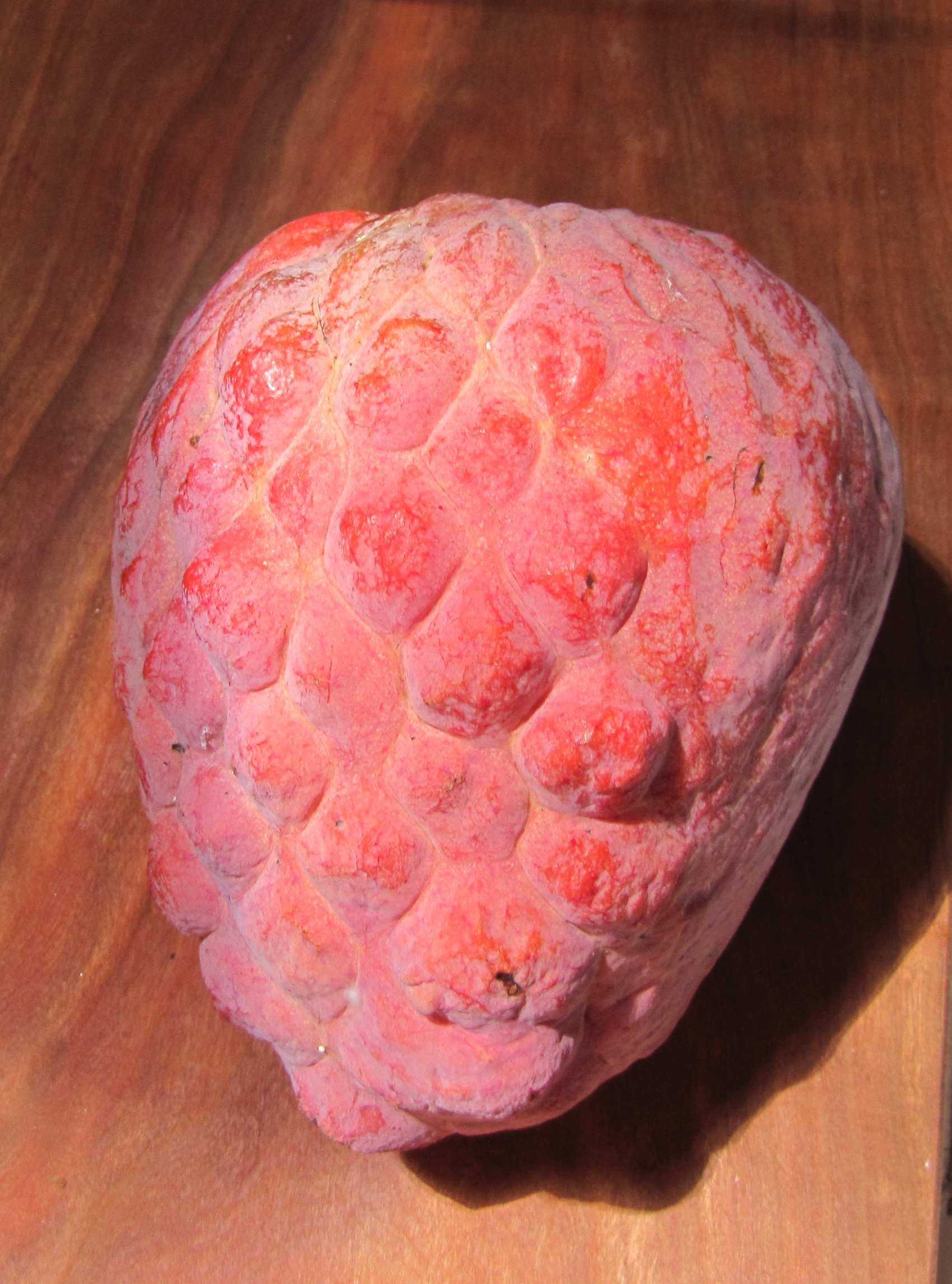
Annona fruit
