= Annona jamaicensis =

Conservation status
- Vulnerable (IUCN 3.1)

Scientific classification
- Kingdom: Plantae
- Clade: Tracheophytes
- Clade: Angiosperms
- Clade: Magnoliids
- Order: Magnoliales
- Family: Annonaceae
- Genus: Annona
- Species: A. jamaicensis

Binomial name
- Annona jamaicensis Sprague

Species of flowering plant

Annona jamaicensis is a species of plant in the Annonaceae family. It is endemic to Jamaica. Its pollen is shed as permanent tetrads.
