= Annona nitida =

Conservation status
- Least Concern (IUCN 3.1)

Scientific classification
- Kingdom: Plantae
- Clade: Tracheophytes
- Clade: Angiosperms
- Clade: Magnoliids
- Order: Magnoliales
- Family: Annonaceae
- Genus: Annona
- Species: A. nitida

Binomial name
- Annona nitida Mart.

Species of tree

Annona nitida is a species of flowering plant in the Annonaceae family. It is a tree native to northern Brazil and northern Peru. It grows in lowland floodplain Amazon rainforest.

The species was first described by Carl Friedrich Philipp von Martius in 1841.
