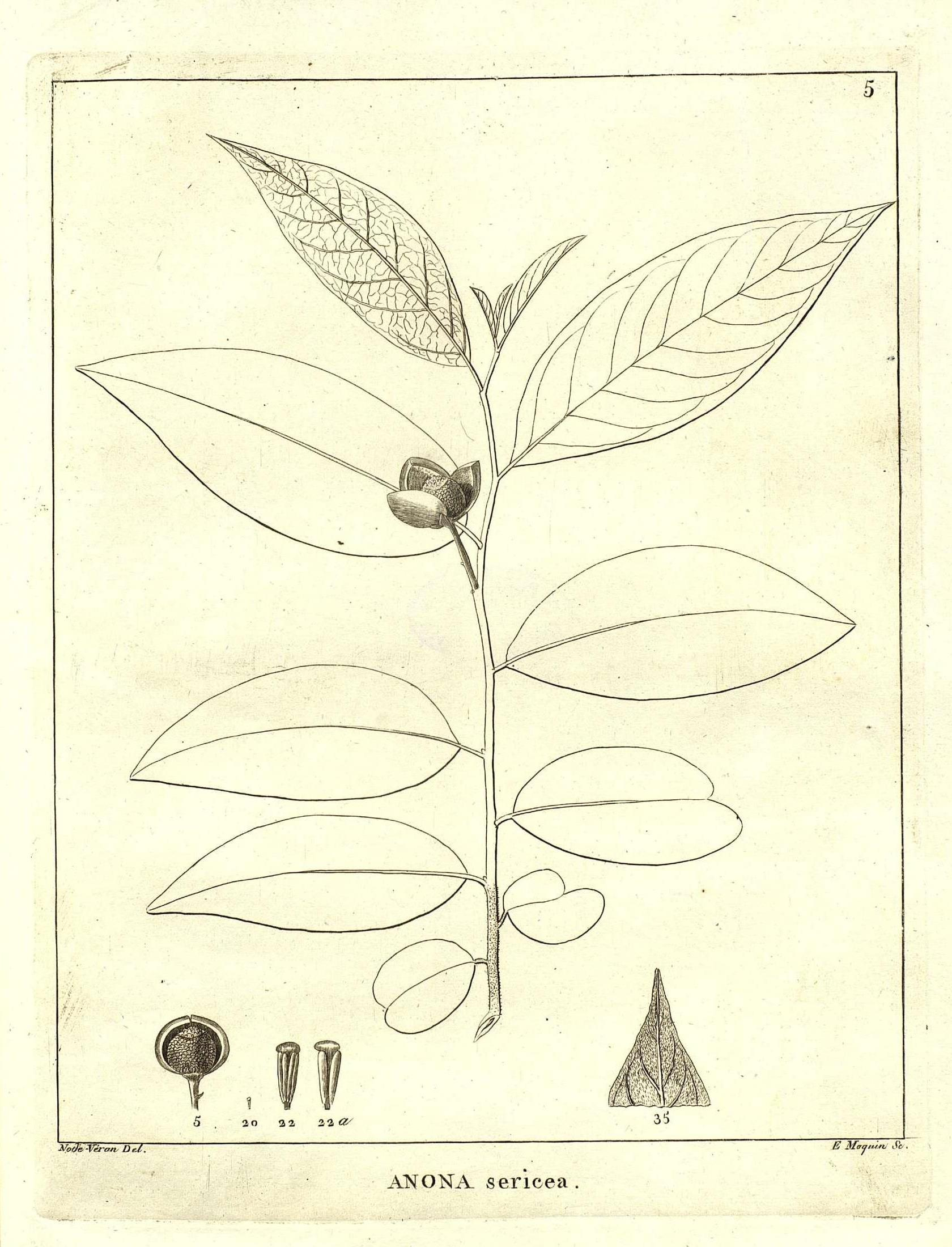
- Botanical illustration of Annona sericea

Conservation status
- Least Concern (IUCN 3.1)

Scientific classification
- Kingdom: Plantae
- Clade: Tracheophytes
- Clade: Angiosperms
- Clade: Magnoliids
- Order: Magnoliales
- Family: Annonaceae
- Genus: Annona
- Species: A. sericea

Binomial name
- Annona sericea Dunal

Synonyms
- Annona jenmanii Saff. Annona trinitensis Saff.

= Annona sericea =

Species of flowering plant

Annona sericea is a species of plant in the family Annonaceae. It is native to Bolivia, Brazil, Colombia, French Guiana, Guyana, Suriname, Trinidad-Tobago and Venezuela. Michel Félix Dunal, the French botanist who first formally described the species, named it after the silky hairs (sericeus in Latin) on its branches and leaves. In Brazil its common name is Aratincum do Para.

== Description ==
It is a tree reaching 1.3–2 meters in height. Its young branches are covered in deep red silky hairs. Its leaves are arranged in opposite rows. Its oblong, membranous leaves are 10.5-18 by 3.5-5.5 centimeters and come to a point at their tip. The leaves have numerous small spots which transmit light. The leaves are hairless on their upper surface, but hairy on their lower surface – particularly the midrib and veins which have dark red silky hairs. The leaves have 18-25 secondary veins emanating from either side of the midrib. Its petioles are 4-8 millimeters long, and covered in rust-colored silky hairs. Its flowers are on peduncles that are 11-16 millimeters long, extra-axillary, and occur alone or in pairs. The peduncles are covered in fine rust-colored hairs and have a bracteole at their midpoint. The sepals are united to form calyx with 3 oval to triangular lobes that come to a point. The outer surface of the calyx is covered in dark red hairs. Its flowers usually have 3 petals but can have 6, arranged in two alternating rows of 3. The thick, oval, concave petals are 12-16 by 10-12 millimeters, come to a shallow point. The margins of the petals touch but are not united. The outer surface of the petals is covered in rust-colored fine, silky hairs, the inner surface is covered in tawny yellow, woolly hairs. The convex receptacle of the flowers is 6 millimeters in diameter and covered in wispy yellow hairs. Its flowers have numerous stamens that are 1.8-2.2 millimeters long with short, flat filaments and 1.5-1.7 millimeter long anthers. The tissue connecting the lobes of the anthers is overgrown to form a hood covered in stiff hairs. Its carpels and club-shaped styles are 1.8-2.2 millimeters long. Its ovaries are covered in red silky hairs. Its immature, oval fruit are 2.5 centimeters long and 1.5 centimeters in diameter and covered in cone-shaped projections. Its seeds are oval and have a caruncle at one end.

=== Reproductive biology ===
The pollen of Annona sericea is shed as permanent tetrads.
