= Annona atabapensis =

Conservation status
- Least Concern (IUCN 3.1)

Scientific classification
- Kingdom: Plantae
- Clade: Tracheophytes
- Clade: Angiosperms
- Clade: Magnoliids
- Order: Magnoliales
- Family: Annonaceae
- Genus: Annona
- Species: A. atabapensis

Binomial name
- Annona atabapensis Kunth

Species of flowering plant

Annona atabapensis is a species of flowering plant in the Annonaceae family. It is a tree native to northern Brazil and southern Venezuela (Amazonas).

The species was first described by Carl Sigismund Kunth in 1821.
