= Annona haematantha =

Conservation status
- Least Concern (IUCN 3.1)

Scientific classification
- Kingdom: Plantae
- Clade: Tracheophytes
- Clade: Angiosperms
- Clade: Magnoliids
- Order: Magnoliales
- Family: Annonaceae
- Genus: Annona
- Species: A. haematantha

Binomial name
- Annona haematantha Miq.

Species of flowering plant

Annona haematantha is a species of flowering plant in the family Annonaceae. It is a tree or liana native to northern Brazil, the Guianas (French Guiana, Guyana and Suriname), southeastern Colombia, Ecuador, and Peru. Friedrich Anton Wilhelm Miquel, the Dutch botanist who first formally described the species, named it after its blood-red flowers (Latinized forms of Greek αἱμάτῐνος, haimátinos and ἄνθος, ánthos).

== Description ==
It is a woody vine reaching 5 centimeters in diameter. It has climbing habit that becomes horizontal as it reaches the forest canopy. Its membranous, elliptical leaves are 12–15 by 5-7 centimeters and come to a tapering point at their tip. Its leaves have 10-12 pairs of secondary veins emanating from their midribs. Its petioles are 5-6 millimeters and covered in rust-colored hairs. Its inflorescences have a solitary flower on a 10 millimeter long pedicel that is 1 millimeters in diameter. It has oval to triangular sepals that are 2-3 millimeters long and covered in dense brown hair. Its 6 petals are arranged in two rows of 3. The outer petals are fused to form a tube 5-10 millimeters long by 10 millimeters in diameter, with oval to triangular lobes that are 10–20 by 10-15 millimeters. The outer petals are yellow to red outside and deep red inside. The inner petals are fused to form a 7 millimeter long tube with 2 millimeter long triangular lobes.

=== Reproductive biology ===
The pollen of A. haematantha is shed as permanent tetrads.

=== Distribution and habitat ===
It grows in forests and swamp-forests in sandy soil. It flowers in January.

=== Uses ===
Bioactive compounds extracted from the roots have been reported to have antileishmanial properties.
