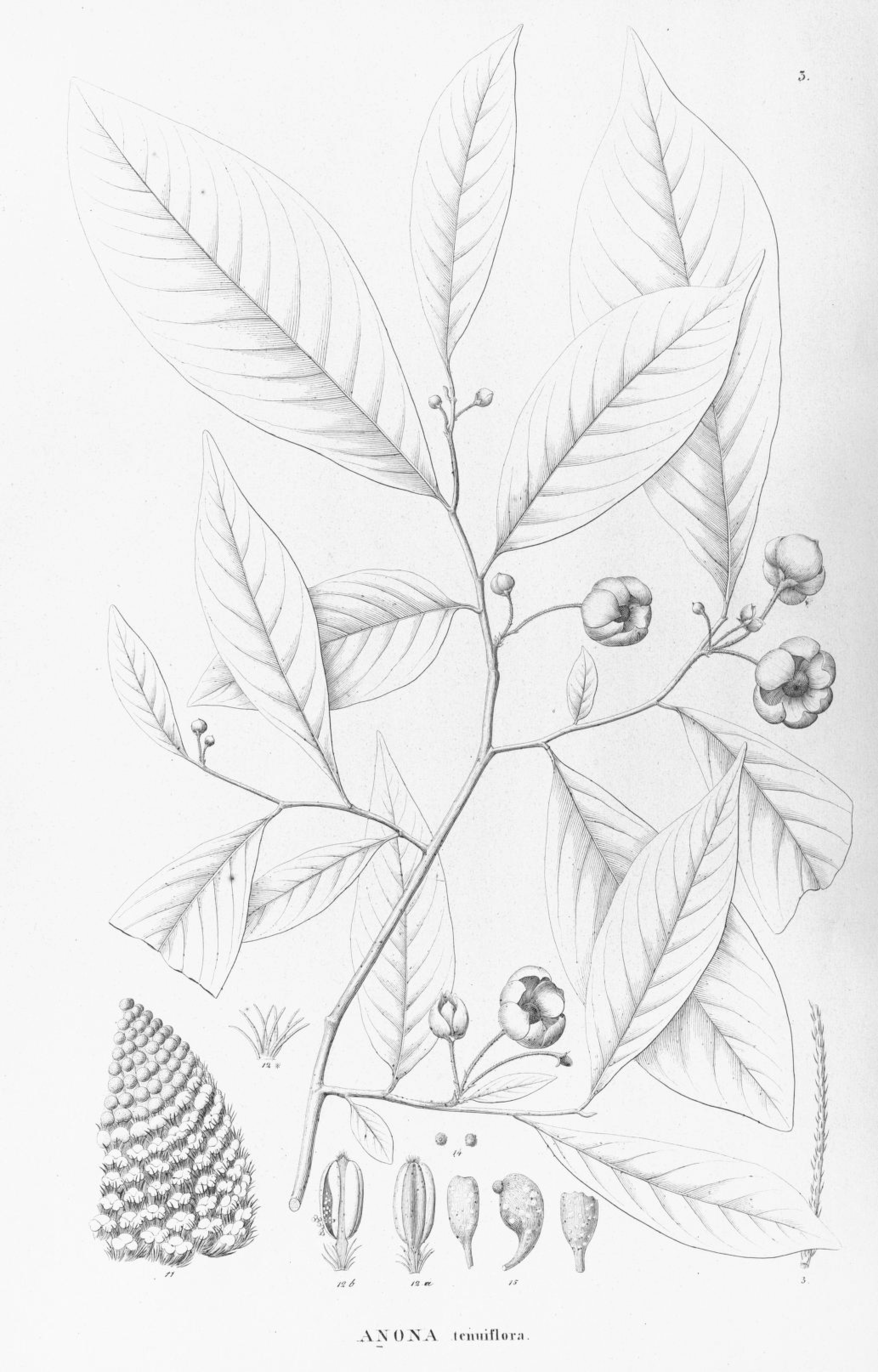
- Botanical illustration of Annona tenuiflora

Conservation status
- Least Concern (IUCN 3.1)

Scientific classification
- Kingdom: Plantae
- Clade: Tracheophytes
- Clade: Angiosperms
- Clade: Magnoliids
- Order: Magnoliales
- Family: Annonaceae
- Genus: Annona
- Species: A. tenuiflora

Binomial name
- Annona tenuiflora Mart.

Synonyms
- Annona humilis Benth.; Annona poeppigiana Saff. ex R.E.Fr.; Raimondia tenuiflora (Mart.) R.E.Fr.

= Annona tenuiflora =

Species of plant

Annona tenuiflora is a species of flowering plant in the family Annonaceae. It is a shrub or tree native to northern Brazil, Colombia, French Guiana, Suriname, Peru, and Venezuela. Carl Friedrich Philipp von Martius, the German botanist who first formally described the species in 1841, named it after the slender (tenui- in Latin) sepals and petals of its flowers.

== Description ==
It is a tree that reaches greater than 9.75 meters in height. Its leaves are 5.4-27 centimeters by 2.7-10.8 and have rounded tips. The leaves have a reddish underside and slightly wavy margins. Its peduncles are 2.7 - 4.1 centimeters long. Carl von Martius conjectured that it has male and female flowers. Its sepals are 2.25 millimeters long. Its flowers have 6 petals in two rows of three. Its pink, concave, oval petals are 1.8 centimeters long. It has numerous tightly packed stamens with hairs at their base, arranged on a conical receptacle. Its anthers are pink.

=== Reproductive biology ===
The pollen of A. tenuiflora is shed as permanent tetrads.

=== Habitat and distribution ===
It has been observed in woodland habitats.

=== Uses ===
It has been reported to be used to treat headache, dizziness and hypotension.
