= Annona cristalensis =

Conservation status
- Endangered (IUCN 3.1)

Scientific classification
- Kingdom: Plantae
- Clade: Tracheophytes
- Clade: Angiosperms
- Clade: Magnoliids
- Order: Magnoliales
- Family: Annonaceae
- Genus: Annona
- Species: A. cristalensis

Binomial name
- Annona cristalensis (Alain) Borhidi & Moncada

Synonyms
- Xylopia cristalensis Alain

Species of flowering plant

Annona cristalensis is a species of flowering plant in the family Annonaceae. It is a tree endemic to eastern Cuba.
