= Annona conica =

Conservation status
- Vulnerable (IUCN 3.1)

Scientific classification
- Kingdom: Plantae
- Clade: Tracheophytes
- Clade: Angiosperms
- Clade: Magnoliids
- Order: Magnoliales
- Family: Annonaceae
- Genus: Annona
- Species: A. conica

Binomial name
- Annona conica Ruiz & Pav. ex G.Don

Synonyms
- Raimondia conica (Ruiz & Pav. ex G.Don) Westra; Raimondia quinduensis var. latifolia R.E.Fr.; Raimondia stenocarpa R.E.Fr.

Species of flowering plant

Annona conica is a species of flowering plant in the family Annonaceae. It is endemic to Ecuador. Its natural habitats are subtropical or tropical dry forests and subtropical or tropical moist lowland forests. It is threatened by habitat loss. The maximum average height for a domesticated Annona Conica is around 300 cm and in the wild 500 cm.
