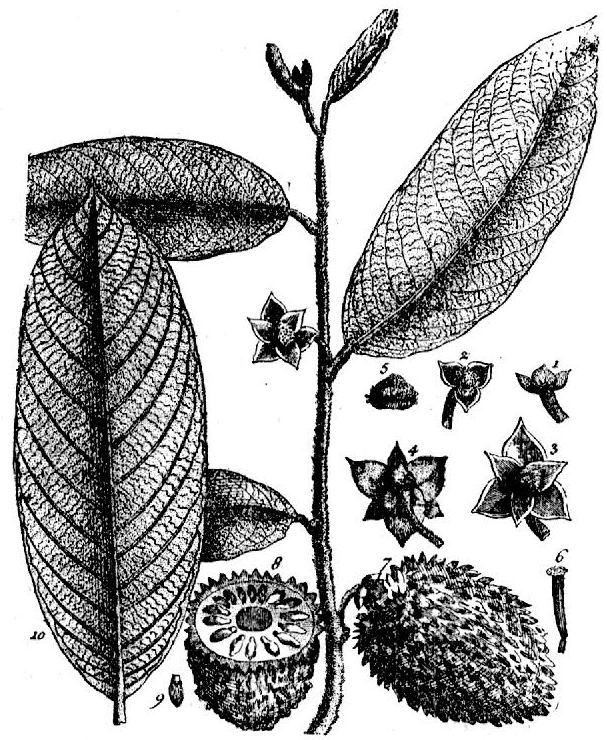
- Botanical illustration of Annona paludosa

Conservation status
- Least Concern (IUCN 3.1)

Scientific classification
- Kingdom: Plantae
- Clade: Tracheophytes
- Clade: Angiosperms
- Clade: Magnoliids
- Order: Magnoliales
- Family: Annonaceae
- Genus: Annona
- Species: A. paludosa

Binomial name
- Annona paludosa Aubl.

Synonyms
- Annona prevostiae H.Rainer

= Annona paludosa =

Species of plant

Annona paludosa is a species of flowering plant in the family Annonaceae. It is a shrub native to northern Bolivia, northern and central Brazil, French Guiana, and Suriname. Jean Baptiste Christophore Fusée Aublet, the French pharmacist and botanist who first formally described the species, named it after its swampy (paludosus in Latin) habitat.

== Description ==
It is a bush reaching 1.2-1.5 meters in height. Its branches have numerous light brown lenticels. Its oblong, membranous leaves are 16-20 by 6-7.5 centimeters and come to a point at their tip. The mature leaves are hairless on their green upper surface, but have woolly rust colored hairs on their reddish lower surfaces. The leaves have 18-20 secondary veins emanating from each side of their midribs. Its petioles are 5 by 3 millimeters, densely covered in woolly hairs, and have a groove on their upper surface. Its flowers are on 10-15 millimeter long peduncles that occur alone or in pairs. The peduncles are covered in woolly hairs and have a bracteole at their base and midpoint. Its sepals are united to form a calyx with 3 triangular lobes that are 10 by 10 millimeters and come to a tapering point. The outer surfaces of the sepals are covered in rust-colored woolly hairs. Its flowers have 6 petals arranged in two rows of 3. The thick, oval, outer petals have margins that touch but are not united. The outer petals are 15-18 by 15 millimeters, have a central ridge, and are covered in fine gray woolly hairs. The thinner inner petals are 14-15 by 6 millimeters and alternate with the outer petals. The inner petals are concave and covered on both surfaces with fine gray woolly hairs. Its flowers have numerous stamens that are 2.8-3 millimeters long. The velvety tissue connecting the lobes of anthers forms a cap on top of the stamens. Its flowers have numerous carpels. Its mature, oval, yellow fruit are 6 by 4 centimeters and covered in fleshy, pointed projections. Its broad, smooth, oval seeds are 8 by 4 millimeters with a prominent caruncle at their base.

=== Reproductive biology ===
The pollen of Annona paludosa is shed as permanent tetrads.

=== Habitat and distribution ===
It grows in marshy meadows.

=== Uses ===
It was reported by the American agronomist and botanist Edward Lewis Sturtevant in 1919 to have edible, juicy, yellow fruit.
