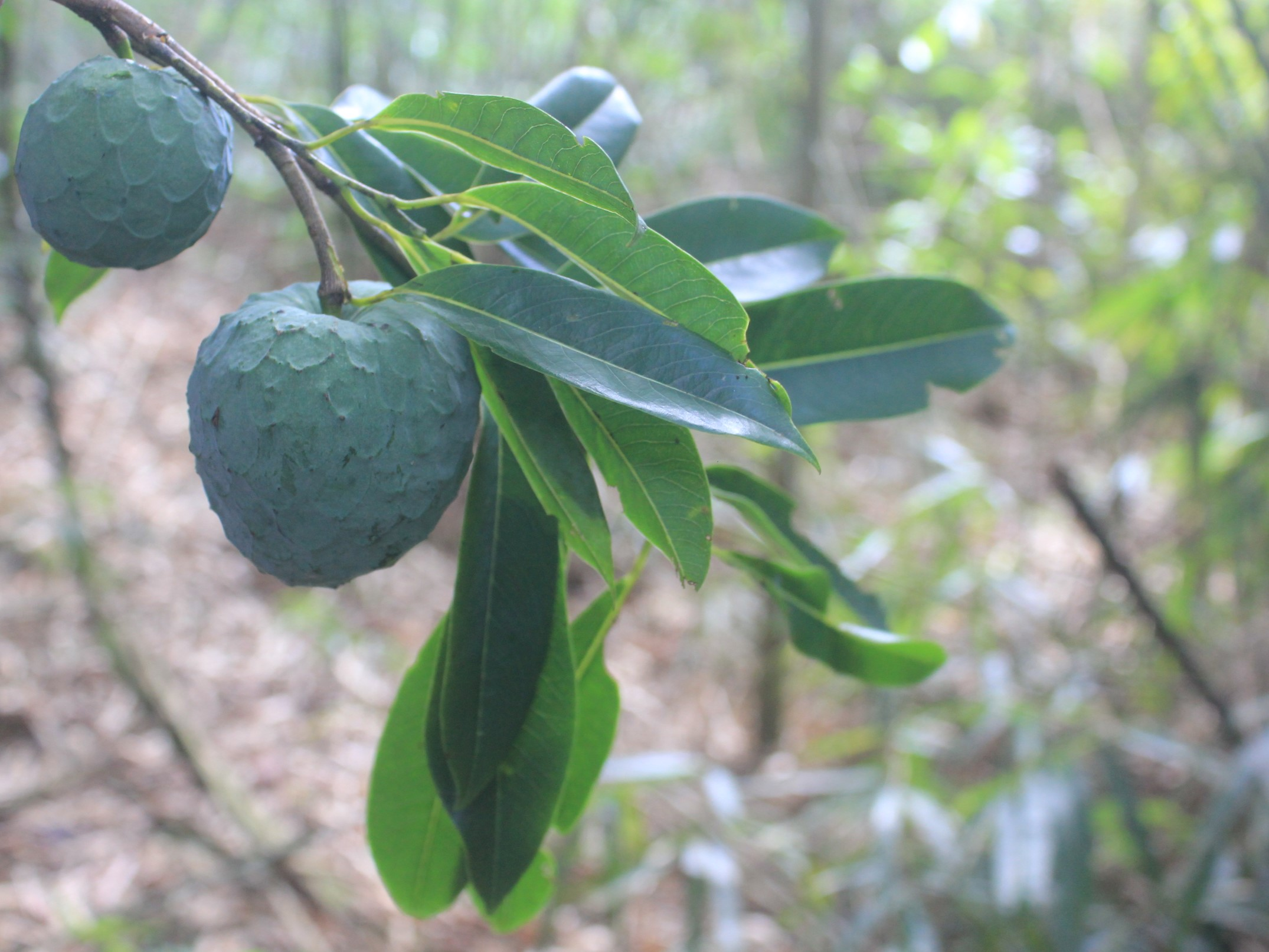
- Leaves and fruit

Conservation status
- Least Concern (IUCN 3.1)

Scientific classification
- Kingdom: Plantae
- Clade: Tracheophytes
- Clade: Angiosperms
- Clade: Magnoliids
- Order: Magnoliales
- Family: Annonaceae
- Genus: Annona
- Species: A. cacans

Binomial name
- Annona cacans Warm.

Subspecies
- A. c. subsp. cacans A. c. subsp. glabriuscula

= Annona cacans =

Species of tree

Annona cacans, with the common names: araticum-cagão, araticum de paca, araticum-pacarí, is a fruit tree native to Atlantic Forest and Cerrado vegetation in Brazil and Paraguay.

== Description ==
This tree is among the largest in the genus Annona. It usually grows 5–30 metres (16–98 ft).

The fruit's succulent clear or white flesh is edible with a sweet or bitter flavor. It cannot be eaten in large amounts due to the laxative properties. They are also a food source of the paca. Its pollen is shed as permanent tetrads.
