= Annona deceptrix =

Conservation status
- Vulnerable (IUCN 3.1)

Scientific classification
- Kingdom: Plantae
- Clade: Tracheophytes
- Clade: Angiosperms
- Clade: Magnoliids
- Order: Magnoliales
- Family: Annonaceae
- Genus: Annona
- Species: A. deceptrix

Binomial name
- Annona deceptrix (Westra) H.Rainer

Synonyms
- Raimondia deceptrix Westra

Species of flowering plant

Annona deceptrix is a species of plant in the Annonaceae family. It is endemic to Ecuador. Its natural habitat is subtropical or tropical moist lowland forests. It is threatened by habitat loss.
