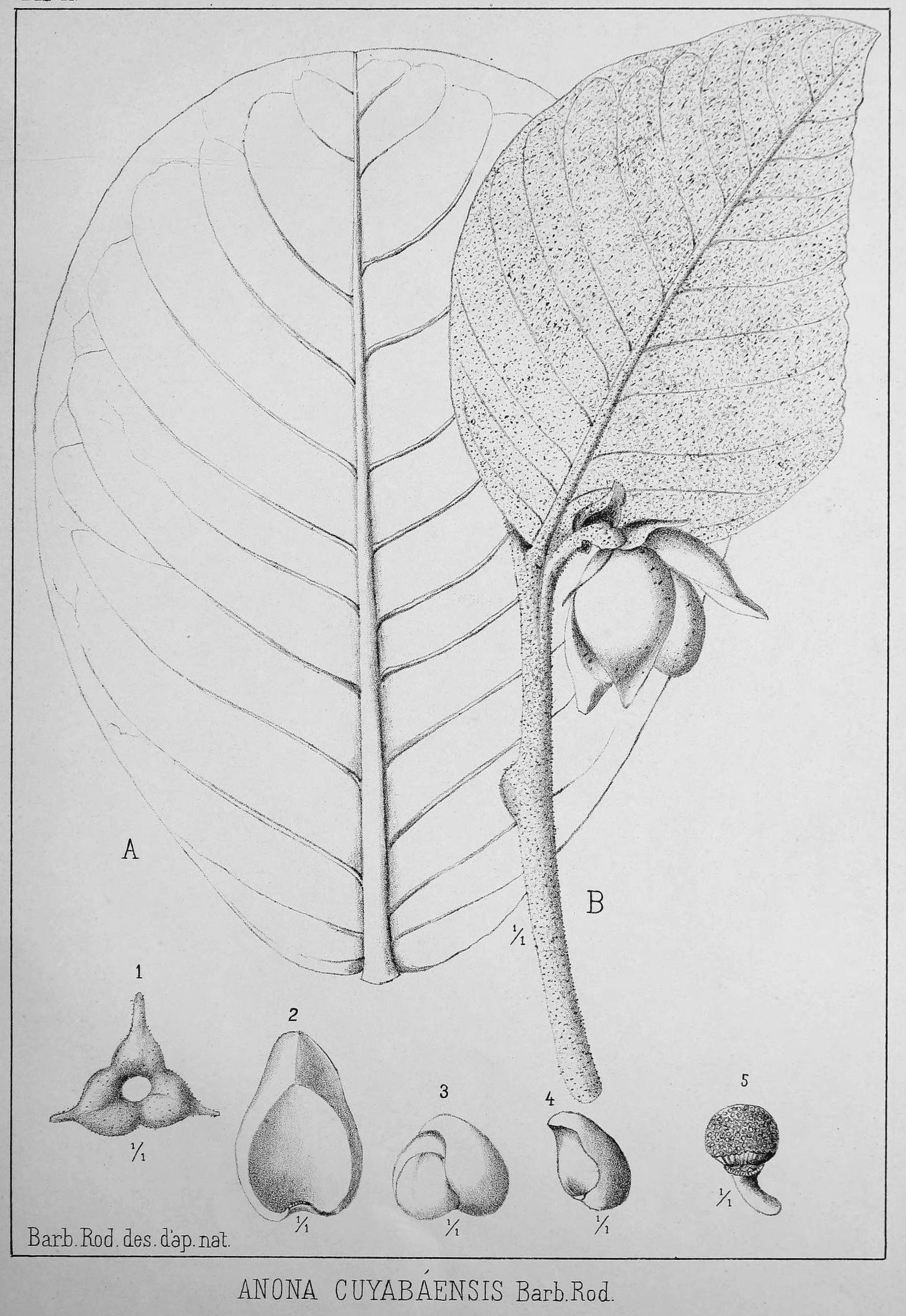
- Botanical illustration of Annona dioica using they synonym A. cuyabaensis

Conservation status
- Least Concern (IUCN 3.1)

Scientific classification
- Kingdom: Plantae
- Clade: Tracheophytes
- Clade: Angiosperms
- Clade: Magnoliids
- Order: Magnoliales
- Family: Annonaceae
- Genus: Annona
- Species: A. dioica

Binomial name
- Annona dioica A.St.-Hil.

Synonyms
- Aberemoa dioica (A.St.-Hil.) Barb.Rodr.; Annona cuyabaensis Barb.Rodr.; Annona dioica var. mattogrossensis R.E.Fr.

= Annona dioica =

Species of flowering plant

Annona dioica is a species of plant in the family Annonaceae. It is native to Bolivia, Brazil and Paraguay. Augustin Saint-Hilaire, the French botanist who first formally described the species, named it after its flowers which have different reproductive structures (δίς, dís, two in Greek) and (οἶκος, oîkos, house in Greek).

== Description ==
It is a bush reaching 0.5-2 meters in height. Its oval, hairy leaves are 5-16 by 3-15 centimeters and have rounded tips. Its petioles are 2.25-4.5 millimeters long and covered in wooly hair. Its inflorescences consist of 1-3 curved peduncles that are 2-3.4 centimeters long and covered in rust-colored hairs. Its flowers have a diameter of 6.75 centimeters. Its calyx has triangular lobes. Its yellow-green outer petals are oval-shaped, leathery, hairy and come to a shallow point at their tips. The inner petals are smaller than the outer. Its stamens have 4 millimeter long filaments and anthers that are 4 times as long.

=== Reproductive biology ===
The pollen of Annona dioica is shed as permanent tetrads. Plants are androdioecious with flowers that are both male and female, or male only. Pollination is mediated by the Cyclocephala atricapilla beetle.

=== Distribution and habitat ===
It grows at elevations of 80-1000 meters. It blossoms in December.

=== Uses ===
Extracts from the leaves and wood contain bioactive compounds. Parts of the plant are used in Brazilian traditional medicine to treat a variety of ailments including diarrhea and rheumatism.
