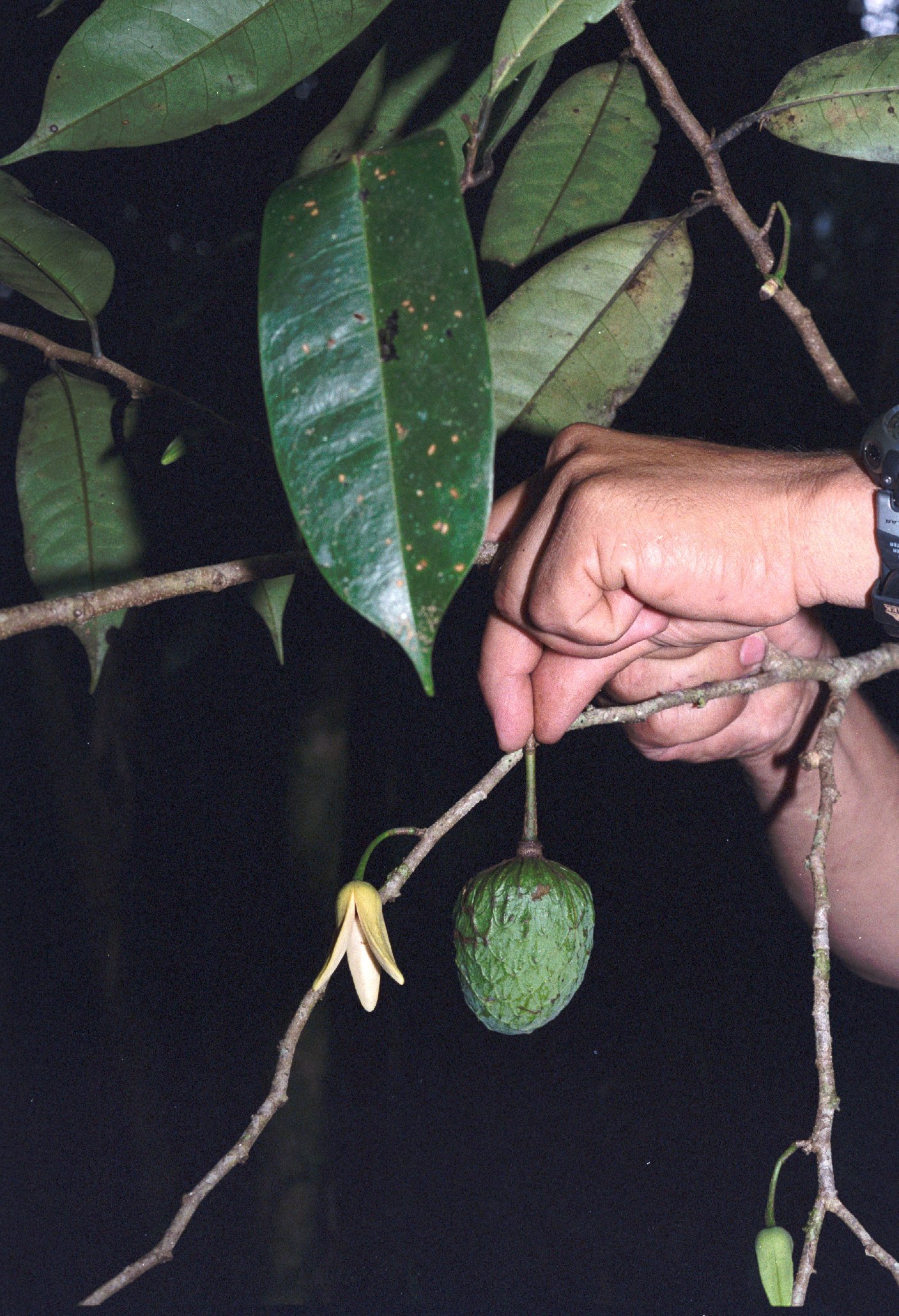
- Photograph of Annona pittieri including leaves, flowers and fruit.

Conservation status
- Least Concern (IUCN 3.1)

Scientific classification
- Kingdom: Plantae
- Clade: Tracheophytes
- Clade: Angiosperms
- Clade: Magnoliids
- Order: Magnoliales
- Family: Annonaceae
- Genus: Annona
- Species: A. pittieri

Binomial name
- Annona pittieri Donn.Sm.

= Annona pittieri =

Species of plant

Annona pittieri is a species of plant in the family Annonaceae. It is native to Costa Rica and Panama. John Donnell Smith, the American taxonomist who first formally described the species, named it after Henri François Pittier, the Swiss botanist who collected specimen he examined.

== Description ==
Its long thin leaves are 16–18 cm by 4–5 cm. Its leaves have 12 secondary veins emanating from each side of their midribs. Its petioles are 6-8 millimeters long. Its flowers are on 3.3 centimeters long peduncles that occur in groups of 1-5. Its flowers have 3 millimeter long calyces with triangular lobes. Its flowers have 3 triangular petals with concave bases. The petals are 33 by 7 millimeters. Its flowers have receptacles that are 3 millimeters wide. Its stamens are 1 millimeter long. Its ovaries are covered in fine hairs and topped by 2 millimeter long styles.

=== Reproductive biology ===
The pollen of Annona pittieri is shed as permanent tetrads.
