= Annona acutiflora =

- Leaves

Conservation status
- Least Concern (IUCN 3.1)

Scientific classification
- Kingdom: Plantae
- Clade: Tracheophytes
- Clade: Angiosperms
- Clade: Magnoliids
- Order: Magnoliales
- Family: Annonaceae
- Genus: Annona
- Species: A. acutiflora

Binomial name
- Annona acutiflora Mart.

Species of flowering plant

Annona acutiflora is a species of plant in the family Annonaceae. It is native to eastern Brazil. Carl Friedrich Philipp von Martius, the German botanist who first formally described the species, named it after the inner petals which come to a sharp point (acutatus in Latin).

== Description ==
It is a tree reaching 3.7-5.5 meters in height. Its branches have numerous lenticels. Its leaves are crowded and arranged in two opposite rows on the branches. The membranous, oblong leaves are 5.4-13.5 by 2.7-5.4 centimeters. The leaves are smooth, dark green on their upper surfaces, and come to a tapering point at their tip. The leaves have 8-11 pairs of secondary veins emanating from their midribs. Its hairless petioles are 4.5-6.8 millimeters long and have a furrow on their upper surface. Its flower buds are covered in rust-colored hairs. The inflorescences are extra-axillary. When young the inflorescences are enclosed by two triangular, hairy, rust-colored bracts. The inflorescences consist of 2-3 flowers on peduncles. Its flowers have a calyx with 3 triangular lobes that are 4 millimeters long and come to a point at their tip. It has 6 petals arranged in 2 rows of 3. The fleshy outer petals are white with a purple or red spot at their base. The outer petals are united at their base and 12-16 millimeters long. The tip of the outer petals comes to a tapering point. The oval-shaped inner petals are white with a purple spot at their base. The inner petals are 6-8 millimeters long and come to a sharp point at their tips. Its flowers have numerous short, yellow stamens. Its flowers have numerous carpels that are crowded together. Its oblong ovaries are covered with long soft hairs. Its short styles are topped by velvety stigmas. Its unripe fruit are bumpy, oval to cone shaped, reddish, covered in fine hairs.

=== Reproductive biology ===
The pollen of Annona acutiflora is shed as permanent tetrads.

=== Distribution and habitat ===
It grows in moist, forested areas and on coastal sandy areas.
