= Annona cornifolia =

Scientific classification
- Kingdom: Plantae
- Clade: Tracheophytes
- Clade: Angiosperms
- Clade: Magnoliids
- Order: Magnoliales
- Family: Annonaceae
- Genus: Annona
- Species: A. cornifolia

Binomial name
- Annona cornifolia L.

Species of flowering plant

Annona cornifolia is a slow-growing shrub native to savannas and fields of the Cerrado region of Brazil, reaching a height of 4–5 meters. It prefers a sunny position on acidic, sandy soils and needs good drainage to thrive. After 4–5 years, if grown in full sun, it produces a blood red fruit, which has an orange aromatic, sweet and highly appreciated flesh containing few seeds. The tree resists frosts to −3 °C. It is little known outside of its native range. Propagation is by seeds which have orthodox storage behavior and may take up to 18 months to germinate. Its pollen is shed as permanent tetrads.
