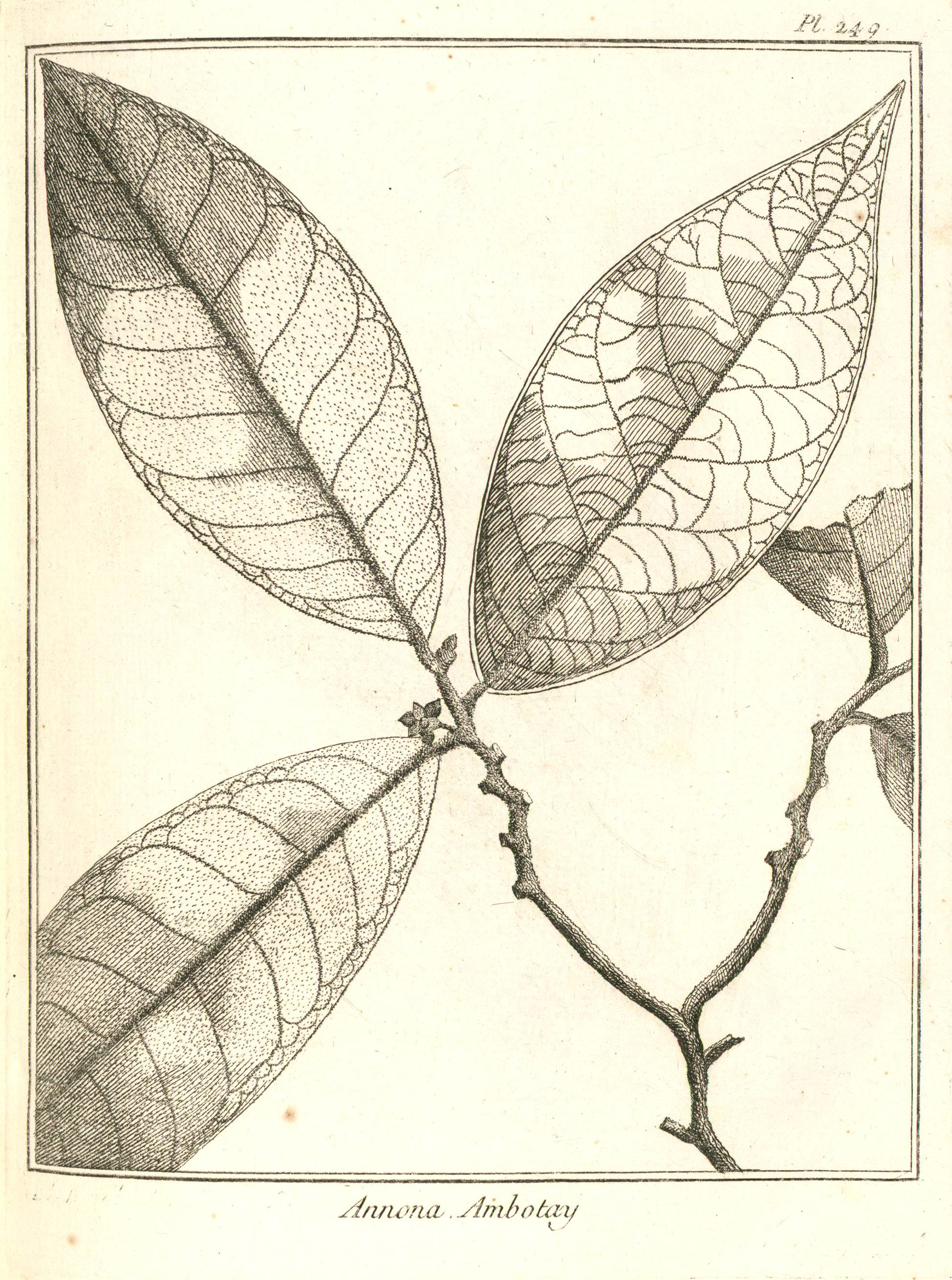
- Illustration of Annona ambotay

Conservation status
- Least Concern (IUCN 3.1)

Scientific classification
- Kingdom: Plantae
- Clade: Tracheophytes
- Clade: Angiosperms
- Clade: Magnoliids
- Order: Magnoliales
- Family: Annonaceae
- Genus: Annona
- Species: A. ambotay

Binomial name
- Annona ambotay Aubl.

Synonyms
- Annona ambotay subsp. occidentalis R.E.Fr.

= Annona ambotay =

Species of tree

Annona ambotay is a species of flowering plant in the Annonaceae family. It is a tree or scrambling shrub native to tropical South America, including Colombia, Ecuador, Peru, Bolivia, Venezuela, the Guianas, and northern and west-central Brazil. It grows in lowland tropical rainforest, including the Amazon rainforest.
