= Annona stenophylla =

- Preserved A. stenophylla specimen

Scientific classification
- Kingdom: Plantae
- Clade: Tracheophytes
- Clade: Angiosperms
- Clade: Magnoliids
- Order: Magnoliales
- Family: Annonaceae
- Genus: Annona
- Species: A. stenophylla

Binomial name
- Annona stenophylla Engl. & Diels

Synonyms
- Annona friesii Robyns & Ghesq.

Species of plant

Annona stenophylla is a species of plant in the family Annonaceae. It is native to Tanzania and Zambia. Adolf Engler and Ludwig Diels, the German botanists who first formally described the species, named it after its narrow leaves (Latinized forms of Greek στενός, stenós, and φύλλον, phúllon).

== Description ==
A. stenophylla is a bush that grows from 0.3 to 1 meters in height.

Its membranous, narrow leaves are 4-18 by 1-6 centimeters. The tips of its leaves can come to a point, be rounded, or be slightly indented. Its leaves are hairless and blueish green on their upper surface and have paler lower surface covered in dense, fine hairs. The leaves have 5-7 orange to red secondary veins emanating from either side of their midribs. Its petioles are 0.8-10 millimeters long and have a groove.

Its solitary flowers are on hairy, extra-axillary pedicels that are 0.8-2.5 centimeters long. The peduncles are covered in fine woolly hairs. Its triangular sepals are 2.5-3 by 3-4 millimeters. The outer surface of the sepals are covered in woolly hairs and their inner surface is hairless.

Its flowers have two rows of petals. The thick, leathery, oval to triangular, green outer petals are 0.8-1 by 0.8-1.2 centimeters. The concave outer petals come to a shallow point at their tips and are concave and are covered in dense fine hairs on their outer surface. Its oblong, narrow inner petals are 6-10 by 1.5-2.5 millimeters and hairless.

=== Reproductive biology ===
Its stamens are 1.5-2 millimeters long. The tissue connecting the lobes of the anthers overgrows to form a cap. Its cylindrical carpels are 1-1.5 millimeters long and hairless. Its fruit are on 1.5-4 centimeter long, hairy pedicels. Its fruit are dark yellow, oval to round, 1.7-3 centimeters in diameter, hairless and have an outer surface that has a network pattern. Its numerous seeds are brown, oval, flat and 7-9 by 3-4 millimeters with a caruncle at one end.

The pollen of A. stenophylla is shed as permanent tetrads.

== Distribution and habitat ==
It grows on sandy soil. It has been observed growing at elevations of 1200 to 1500 meters.

== Uses ==
A paste of the roots is used in traditional medicine in Zimbabwe to treat sexually transmitted infections and as a snake repellant. Bioactive molecules extracted from the bark of the root are reported to have hypoglycemic activity in diabetic mice.

The pulp of the ripe fruit is edible, with a sweet and pleasant taste. It is sought after for eating out of hand and also pressing for juice.
