= Annona foetida =

Conservation status
- Least Concern (IUCN 3.1)

Scientific classification
- Kingdom: Plantae
- Clade: Embryophytes
- Clade: Tracheophytes
- Clade: Spermatophytes
- Clade: Angiosperms
- Clade: Magnoliids
- Order: Magnoliales
- Family: Annonaceae
- Genus: Annona
- Species: A. foetida

Binomial name
- Annona foetida Mart.

Synonyms
- Annona trunciflora R.E.Fr.

Species of plant

Annona foetida is a species of plant in the family Annonaceae. It is a shrub or tree native to Bolivia, northern and west-central Brazil, Colombia, French Guiana, Peru and Suriname. Carl Friedrich Philipp von Martius, the German botanist who first formally described the species, named it after its foul-smelling (fetidus in Latin) odor.

== Description ==
It is a shrub or a tree reaching 3.3-3.9 meters in height. Its dark gray-brown bark is tough and flexible. Its leaves are 10.8-21.6 by 4.1-8.1 centimeters and come to an abrupt point at their tips. Its petioles are 6.8 millimeters long. Its fruit are reddish-brown and the size of a goose egg. Its seeds are flat, yellowish, ovals, 9 millimeters in length. Its bark and unripe fruit have a remarkably foul odor.

=== Reproductive biology ===
The pollen of Annona foetida is shed as permanent tetrads. It is pollinated by the scarab beetle Cyciocephala undata.

=== Habitat and distribution ===
It grows in forest habitats. Its fruit mature in December.

=== Uses ===
Bioactive compounds extracted from leaves, bark and branches have been reported to have antimicrobial, antileishmanial and antitrypanosomal activities.
