= Annona papilionella =

Conservation status
- Least Concern (IUCN 3.1)

Scientific classification
- Kingdom: Plantae
- Clade: Tracheophytes
- Clade: Angiosperms
- Clade: Magnoliids
- Order: Magnoliales
- Family: Annonaceae
- Genus: Annona
- Species: A. papilionella

Binomial name
- Annona papilionella (Diels) H.Rainer

Synonyms
- Rollinia microsepala Standl.; Rollinia papilionella Diels; Rollinia pittieri Saff.

Species of flowering plant

Annona papilionella is a species of flowering plant in the Annonaceae family. It is a tree found in Bolivia, Brazil, Colombia, Costa Rica, Ecuador, Honduras, Nicaragua, Panama, and Peru. It was first described by Friedrich Ludwig Diels in 1927, and received its current name by H. Rainer in 2007.
