= Annona angustifolia =

Conservation status
- Endangered (IUCN 3.1)

Scientific classification
- Kingdom: Plantae
- Clade: Tracheophytes
- Clade: Angiosperms
- Clade: Magnoliids
- Order: Magnoliales
- Family: Annonaceae
- Genus: Annona
- Species: A. angustifolia

Binomial name
- Annona angustifolia Huber

Species of flowering plant

Annona angustifolia is a species of flowering plant in the Annonaceae family. It is climbing shrub native to northern Brazil. Jacques Huber, the Swiss-Brazilian botanist who first formally described the species, named it after its narrow (angustus in Latin) leaves (folium in Latin).

== Description ==
It is a bush with slender branches. Its leaves are arranged in two opposite rows on the branches. Its narrow, smooth, membranous leaves are 6-12 centimeter by 1.2-1.5 centimeters. Its solitary flowers are on 1 centimeter long pedicels that have a small bracteole about halfway up from their base. Its triangular sepals are 2 by 3 millimeters, come to a tapering point at their tips, and are covered in short rust-colored hairs. Its thick exterior petals are round, 1.5 by 1.5 centimeters, concave, and have rust-colored hairs on their inner surface. Its inner petals are thinner, come to a sharp point at their tips and are 8 millimeters long. Its flowers have numerous stamens with filaments that are about 0.5 millimeters long, and 1.5 millimeter long, yellow anthers. The tissue connecting the lobes of the anther forms a cap like structure at its top. Its flowers have numerous ovaries with silky yellow styles and white stigmas.

=== Reproductive biology ===
The pollen of Annona angustifolia is shed as permanent tetrads.

=== Distribution and habitat ===
It grows in forested areas.
