= Annona cordifolia =

Conservation status
- Least Concern (IUCN 3.1)

Scientific classification
- Kingdom: Plantae
- Clade: Tracheophytes
- Clade: Angiosperms
- Clade: Magnoliids
- Order: Magnoliales
- Family: Annonaceae
- Genus: Annona
- Species: A. cordifolia

Binomial name
- Annona cordifolia (Szyszyl.) Poepp. ex Maas & Westra

Synonyms
- Rollinia cordifolia Szyszyl.

Species of plant

Annona cordifolia is a species of plant in the Annonaceae family. It is native to Bolivia, Brazil, Colombia and Peru.

== Description ==
It is a tree reaching 15 meters in height. Its petioles are 10-13 millimeters long. Its leaves are 15–25 by 7-12 centimeters with round or gently pointed tips. The base of the leaves often form a small notch at the attachment to the petiole giving the leaf blade a heart shape. The mature leaves are hairless above except on the veins, and slightly hairy beneath. Its flowers are on pedicels that are 3-4 centimeters long. Its sepals have long threadlike tips. Its flowers have 3 oval petals about 1.5 centimeters in length. Its fruit is ellipsoid, hairy, gray fruit is 4–5 by 2-3 centimeters.

=== Reproductive biology ===
The pollen of Annona cordifolia is shed as permanent tetrads.
