= Annona globiflora =

Scientific classification
- Kingdom: Plantae
- Clade: Embryophytes
- Clade: Tracheophytes
- Clade: Spermatophytes
- Clade: Angiosperms
- Clade: Magnoliids
- Order: Magnoliales
- Family: Annonaceae
- Subfamily: Annonoideae
- Tribe: Annoneae
- Genus: Annona
- Species: A. globiflora

Binomial name
- Annona globiflora Schltdl.

Synonyms
- Annona fruticosa Sessé & Moç.

Species of plant

Annona globiflora is a small fruiting plant in the family Annonaceae. It is native to Mexico.
