= Annona moaensis =

Conservation status
- Critically endangered, possibly extinct (IUCN 3.1)

Scientific classification
- Kingdom: Plantae
- Clade: Tracheophytes
- Clade: Angiosperms
- Clade: Magnoliids
- Order: Magnoliales
- Family: Annonaceae
- Genus: Annona
- Species: A. moaensis

Binomial name
- Annona moaensis León & Alain

Species of plant

Annona moaensis is a species of plant in the family Annonaceae. It is endemic to Cuba. Frère León and Henri Alain Liogier, the botanists who first formally described the species, named it after Moa, Cuba where the specimen they observed was collected.

== Description ==
It is a bush reaching 2–3 metres (6 ft 7 in – 9 ft 10 in) in height. Its branches have white lenticels. Its leaves are 5–9 centimetres (2.0–3.5 in) by 1–2 centimetres (0.39–0.79 in) and come to tapering point. The upper surface of the leaves are glossy, the undersides are lightly covered in wooly hairs. The leaves have 18-20 secondary veins emanating from its midrib. Its petioles are 3-6 millimetres long, covered in rust-colored wooly hairs and have a groove on their upper surface. Its flowers are on 1–1.5 centimetres (0.39–0.59 in) long, black peduncles that are covered in white wooly hairs. The peduncles have a triangular bract about a third of the way up their length. The bract is covered with rust-colored wooly hairs. Its calyx has triangular lobes. It has 3 petals that touch, but are not fused, at their margins. The petals are 20-25 by 3 millimetres and a bit wider at their base. The petals reddish on their outer surface and have wooly hairs on both surfaces. Its round fruit are 2 by 2 centimetres, with a surface covered in small warty projections and gray wooly hairs.

=== Reproductive biology ===
The pollen of A. moaensis is shed as permanent tetrads.

== Distribution and habitat ==
Annona moaensis is endemic to a 8 km^{2} (3.1 sq mi) region in Cuba. It has been observed growing on low coastal hills.

== Conservation ==
As of December 2024, the IUCN Red List listed Annona moaensis as Critically Endangered (CR) worldwide. This status was last assessed on 13 March 2023.
