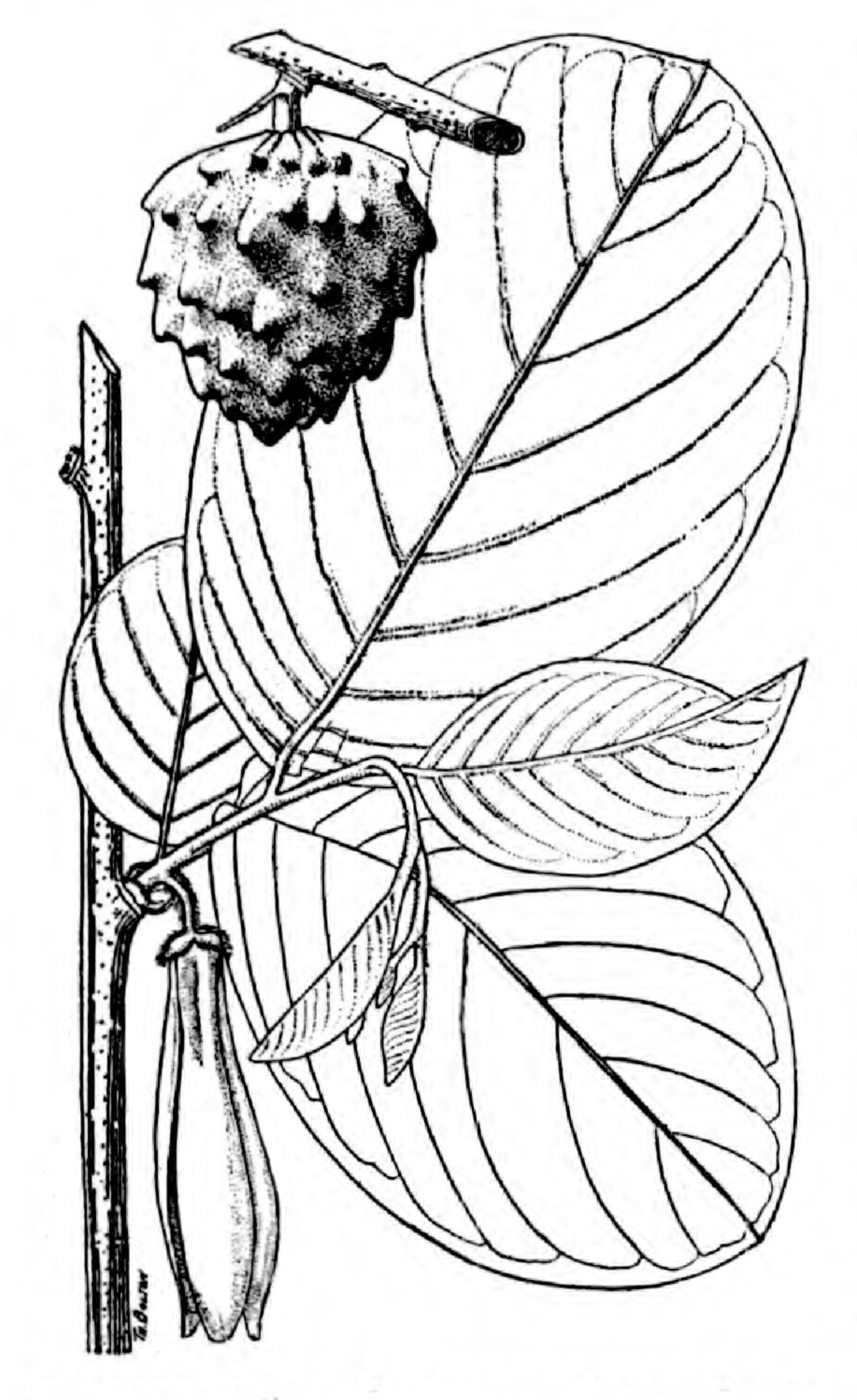
- Botanical illustration of Annona longiflora

Scientific classification
- Kingdom: Plantae
- Clade: Embryophytes
- Clade: Tracheophytes
- Clade: Angiosperms
- Clade: Magnoliids
- Order: Magnoliales
- Family: Annonaceae
- Genus: Annona
- Species: A. longiflora

Binomial name
- Annona longiflora S.Watson

= Annona longiflora =

Species of plant endemic to Mexico

Annona longiflora is a species of plant in the family Annonaceae. It is endemic to Mexico. Sereno Watson, the American botanist who first formally described the species, named it after its long (longus in Latin) flowers.

== Description ==
It is a bush reaching 0.9 meters in height. Its leaves are 5.1-10.2 centimeters long and come to a point at their tip. Its leaves are nearly hairless on their upper surface and covered in soft short hairs on their lower surface. Its triangular to oval sepals are 5.6 millimeters long. Its oblong, outer petals are 5.1 centimeters long. The outer petals are white with a black base. The outer petals are convex at their base and hairless on their inner surface. Its inner petals are essentially absent. Its fruit is globe-shaped or oval, 3.8 centimeters long with a reticulated surface. Its seeds are smooth and shiny.

=== Reproductive biology ===
The pollen of A. longiflora is shed as permanent tetrads.

=== Distribution and habitat ===
It grows in ravines.

=== Uses ===
It is used as a native uncultivated edible fruit in Mexico. Representations of A. longiflora have been found on ceramic jars dating from 100 to 400 C.E. supporting the idea that it was used as part of early food systems.

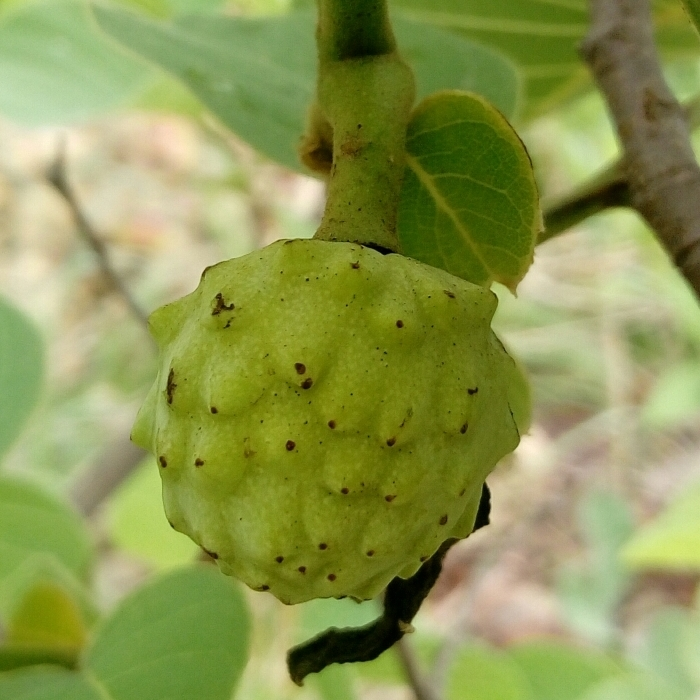
Fruit of Annona longiflora
