= Annona praetermissa =

Conservation status
- Data Deficient (IUCN 3.1)

Scientific classification
- Kingdom: Plantae
- Clade: Tracheophytes
- Clade: Angiosperms
- Clade: Magnoliids
- Order: Magnoliales
- Family: Annonaceae
- Genus: Annona
- Species: A. praetermissa

Binomial name
- Annona praetermissa Rendle

Species of flowering plant

Annona praetermissa (also called wild sour sop) is a species of plant in the Annonaceae family. It is endemic to Jamaica. It is threatened by habitat loss.

== Description ==
Its pollen is shed as permanent tetrads.
