= William Edwin Safford =

American botanist

William Edwin Safford (December 14, 1859, Chillicothe, Ohio – January 10, 1926) was a United States botanist, ethnologist, and educator employed by the U.S. Navy and federal government.

Safford graduated from the U.S. Naval Academy in 1880 and pursued advanced studies at Yale and Harvard. He served in the Spanish–American War. In 1899 he was appointed deputy to the naval governor of Guam, Richard P. Leary. In practice, however, Leary delegated day-to-day administrative and judicial duties to Safford, indicating his preference to directly govern only in emergency situations.

While stationed on Guam, Safford compiled a thorough survey of the plants of economic importance to be found on the island. The resulting volume, published as The Useful Plants of the Island of Guam (Contributions from the United States National Herbarium Vol. IX), remains of interest not only as a pioneering work of ethnobotany but also for its insights into the natural history and folkways of the island. He also wrote a monograph on the Chamorro language of Guam.

Due to his interest in psychoactive plants and their traditional use, Safford can be considered one of the "fathers" of the ethnobotany of psychoactive plants. He became interested in peyote and more generally in all the American psychoactive plants known at that time, and he carried out specific studies on daturas, both of an ethnobotanical nature than botanical and taxonomic. He was also interested in the problem of identifying the cohoba of the ancient Antillean Taínos, being the first scholar to correctly identify this plant as a species of Anadenanthera, at that time botanically referred as Piptadenia. He also made some misidentifications, the most important being the identification of the ololiuhqui of the Aztecs with a species of datura (Safford, 1920, op.cit., pp. 550–552), whereas today we know that it was the convolvulacea Turbina corymbosa (L.) Raf.), and the identification of teonanácatl from ancient texts with peyote, while this Nahuatl name referred to species of hallucinogenic mushrooms (Safford, 1915, op.cit.). These Stafford errors were corrected by Blas Pablo Reko (1934, 1940).

After Leary's term ended in 1900, Safford left the Navy and joined the U.S. Department of Agriculture as assistant botanist. In 1920 he achieved a Ph.D. from George Washington University. He suffered a stroke in 1924 but remained active until his death.

Sixteen plant species are named for Safford in honor of his contributions to botany.

== Bibliography ==
- The Chamorro Language of the Island of Guam (1905)
- Useful Plants of the Island of Guam (1905) (Reissue 2009, Guamology Publishing)
- Cactaceae of Northeastern and Central Mexico (1909)
- Edible Plants and Textiles of Ancient America (1916)
- Natural History of Paradise Key and the Nearby Everglades of Florida (1919)
- Notes on the Genus Dahlia, with Descriptions of New Species (1919)
- Synopsis of the Genus Datura (1921)
- Daturas of the Old World and New (1922)
- Ant Acacias and Acacia Ants of Mexico and Central America (1923)
