= List of food plants native to the Americas =

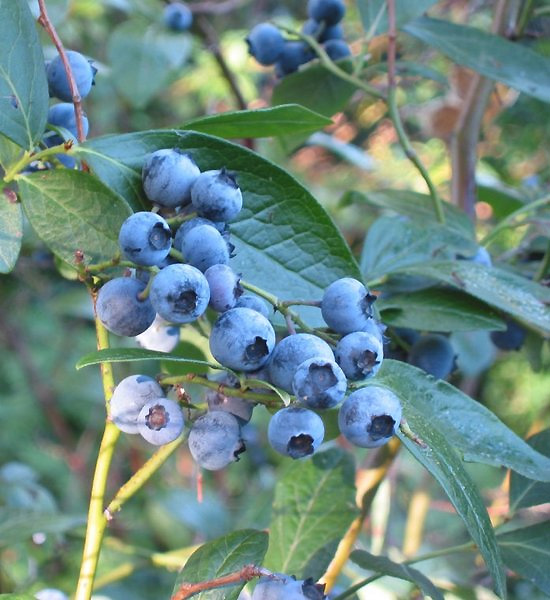
Northern highbush blueberry

A number of popular and commercially important food plants are native to the Americas. Some are endemic, meaning they occur naturally only in the Americas and nowhere else, while others occur naturally both in the Americas and on other continents as well.

When complete, the list below will include all food plants native to the Americas (genera marked with a dagger ^{†} are endemic), regardless of when or where they were first used as a food source. For a list of food plants and other crops which were only introduced to Old World cultures as a result of the Columbian Exchange touched off by the arrival of Christopher Columbus in 1492, see New World crops.

== Grains ==
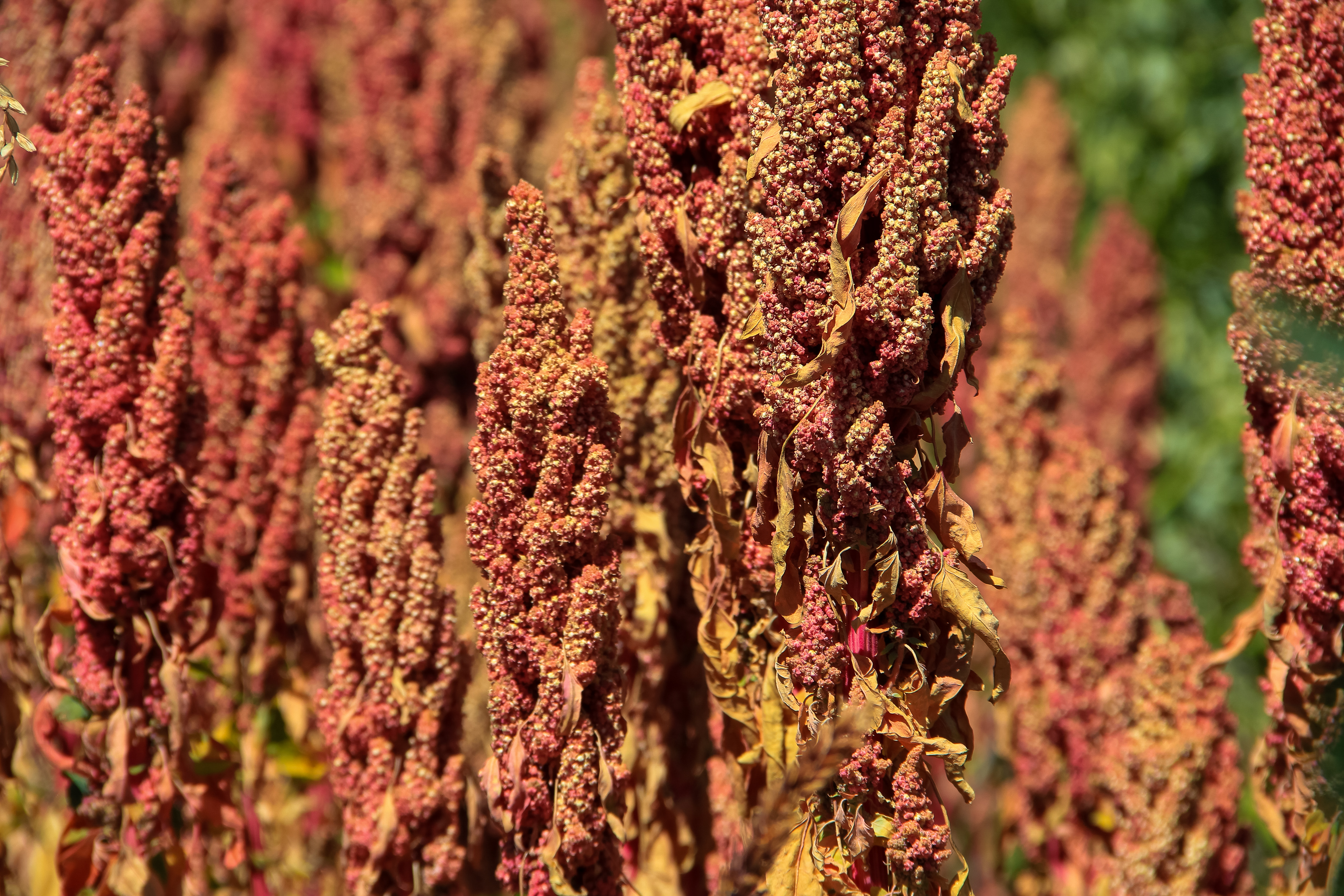
Quinoa is native only to a relatively small region of the Andes mountains in South America

- Maize/corn (Zea^{†})
- Quinoa (Chenopodium)
- Several (though not all) species of amaranth (Amaranthus)
- Some species of wild rice (Zizania)
- Indian Corn (Flint Corn)

== Legumes ==
- Peanut (Arachis^{†})
- Pinto, tepary, black, kidney, navy, scarlet runner (Phaseolus coccineus) and lima beans (Phaseolus^{†})

== Nightshades ==
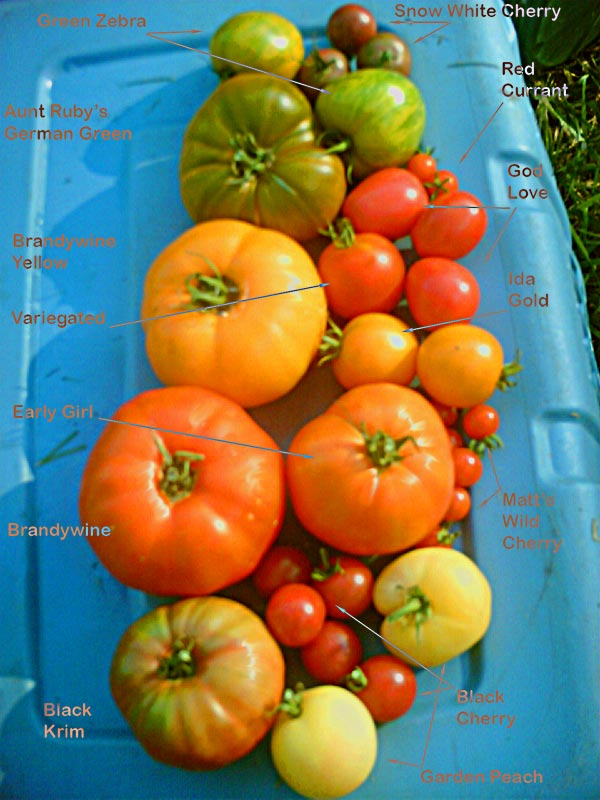
A variety of tomato cultivars

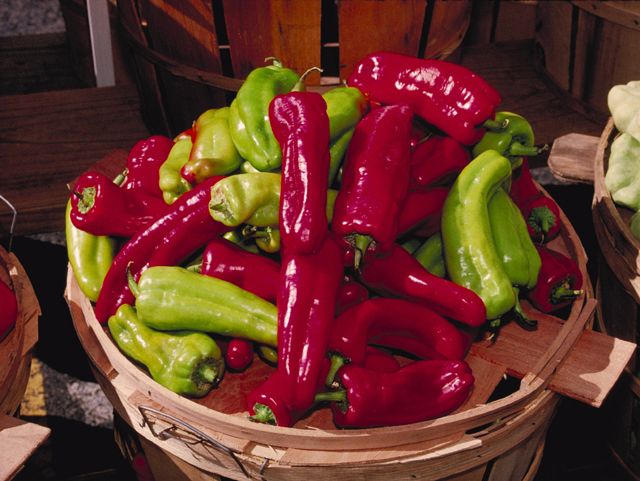
Cubanelle peppers

- Potato (Solanum)
- Tomato (Solanum)
- Bell and chili peppers (Capsicum^{†})
- Tomatillo (Physalis philadelphica)

== Fruits ==
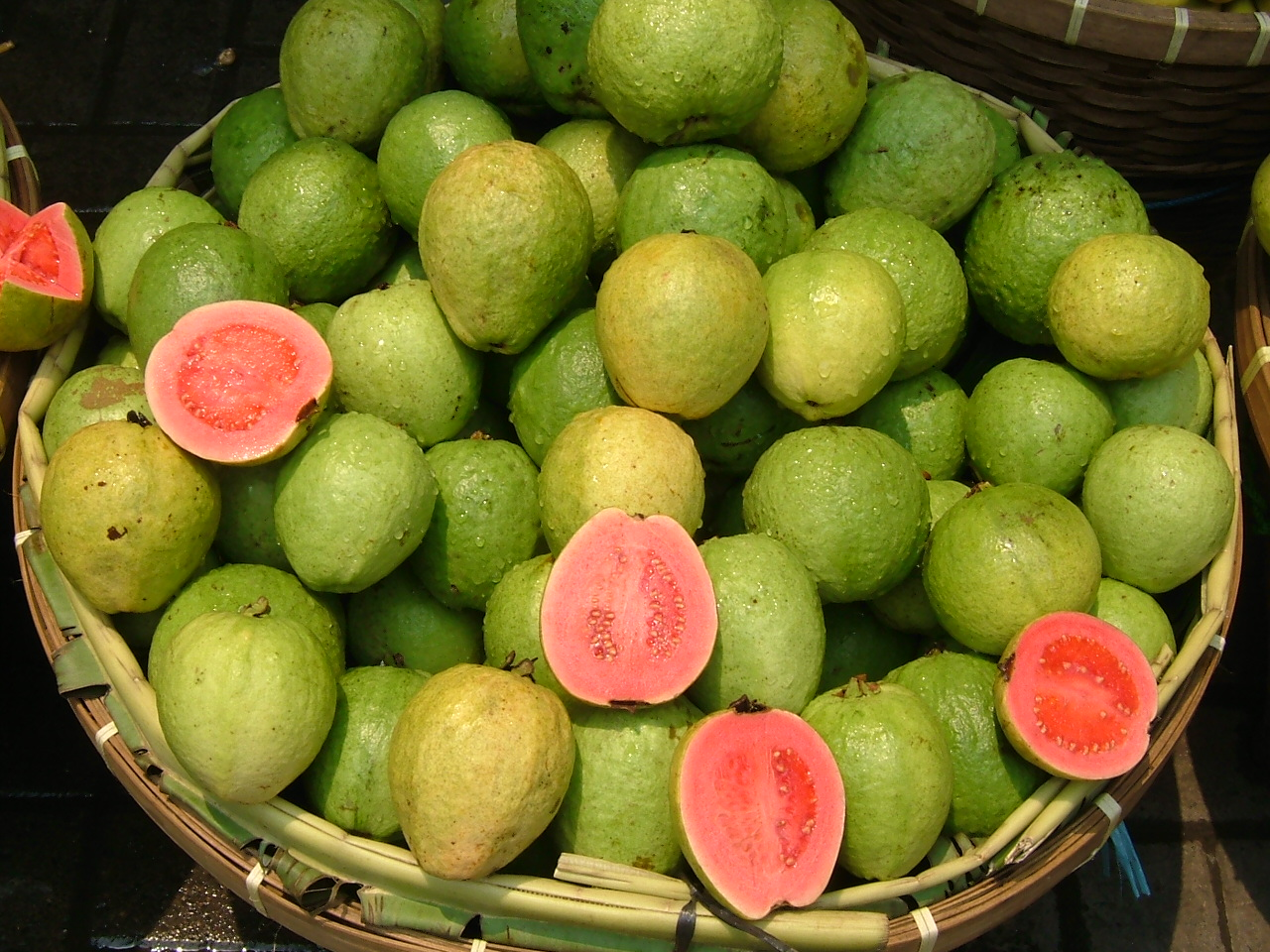
Apple guavas

- Pineapple (Ananas^{†})
- Guava (Psidium^{†} and Acca^{†})
- Cherry guava
- Feijoa
- Guavira
- Perfume guava
- Brazilian perfume guava
- Guinea guava
- Purple guava
- Araçá-una
- Passion fruit (Passiflora)
- Sweet granadilla
- Giant granadilla
- Fragant Granadilla
- Banana passionfruit
- Maypop
- Bell apple
- Cherimoya, sugar-apple, hog plum (Annona)
- Pond apple
- Netted custard apple
- Beach sugar apple
- Orange custard apple
- Red guanabanita (Annona punicifolia)
- Aratico
- Soursop
- Mountain soursop
- Mountain custard apple (Annona monticola)
- Amazon custard apple (Annona amazonica)
- Rollinia
- Soncoya
- Orange soursop (Annona spinescens)
- Marolo
- Wild custard apple
- Ilama
- Guanabilla
- Pepuro
- Guanabana
- Cawesh
- Sprague custard apple
- Araticu da praia
- Araticum
- Canelo
- Savanna Custard Apple
- Guanabano
- Annonilla
- Envira-de-jabuti
- Mano de tigre
- Envira
- Pindaiva
- Pino
- Ameju
- Cherry sugar apple (Duguetia phaeoclados)
- Anonillo
- Jaca de pobre
- Amepi (Duguetia echinophora)
- Amunta
- Pindaiba (Duguetia restingae)
- Ata brava
- Avocado
- Arazá
- Cabeluda
- Red cabeludinha
- Amazon grape
- Bacuri
- Bacupari
- Pawpaw(Asimina^{†})
- Papaya (Carica^{†} and Vasconcellea^{†})
- Oak leaf papaya
- Mountain papaya
- Gulosa (Peritassa laevigata)
- Guabiyu
- Achacha
- Charichuela
- Mameyito
- Cocoplum
- Cerrado pear
- Rumberry
- Dragonfruit/pitaya (Hylocereus^{†} and Stenocereus^{†})
- Pepino melon
- Guaquica
- Guinep
- Courbaril
- Abiurana (Pouteria trilocularis)
- Abuai (Pouteria gardneriana)
- Aguaí da Serra
- Guayabillo
- Sundrop
- Oiti
- Pequi
- Yellow plum
- Pouteria bangii
- Pouteria venosa
- Sapotinha roxa
- Zapotillo (Pouteria durlandii)
- Mamey apple
- Sapodilla
- Mamey Sapote
- White Sapote
- Black Sapote
- Green Sapote
- Sun sapote
- Capoteira
- Pajurá
- Lucuma
- Canistel
- Star apple
- Abiu
- Caimitillo
- Wild star apple
- Cinnamon apple
- Wolf apple
- Ucuqui (Pouteria ucuqui)
- Imbu
- Borojó
- Cuajilote
- Southern Crabapple
- Chal chal
- Camu camu
- Chupa-chupa
- Cacao
- Cupuaçu
- Mocambo
- Cacauí
- Capuí (Theobroma subincanum)
- Cassabanana
- Jabuticaba
- Blue grape tree
- Mulchi
- Cambucá
- Cambuci
- Acerola
- Muntingia
- Savanna pitanga
- Pitanga preta
- Pitanguinha do Rio Parnaíba (Eugenia biflora)
- Pitangão (Eugenia speciosa)
- Murtinha
- Cerninho
- Guamirim (Eugenia florida)
- Nance
- Quinilla
- Guracica
- Chicle muyo
- Tamarillo
- Naranjilla
- Cocona
- Zucchini
- Peanut butter fruit
- Brazilian cherry (Eugenia uniflora and Grumichama)
- Cherry of Rio Grande
- Jabuti cherry
- Brazilian milk fruit (Cordia taguahyensis)
- Blackberry jam fruit (Rosenbergiodendron formosum) and (Rosenbergiodendron longiflorum)
- Cambuí
- Strawberry myrtle
- Caigua
- Cagaita
- Pitomba
- Ice-cream bean
- Churimo
- Inga striata
- Inga laurina
- Inga marginata
- Ingá-guaçú
- Inga vulpina
- Inga bullata
- Ramón
- Aguaje
- Pupunha
- Maraja
- Açaí palm
- Awara
- Macauba palm
- Maripa palm
- Bacaba
- Tucumã
- Patawa
- Juçara
- Cabeçudo
- Jelly palm
- Coco babão
- Cashapona
- Palmito
- Hancornia
- Mamãozinho
- Jocote
- Genip
- Olosapo
- Cansaboca
- Sweet angelim
- Tarumã
- Marirana (Couepia subcordata)
- Ubaia (Eugenia patrisii)
- Ubajay
- Uvalha
- Umari
- Gravatá
- Wild pineapple
- Karatas
- Seagrape
- Sorva
- Guettarda pohliana
- Salacia elliptica
- Manilkara salzmannii
- Fine leafed cherry
- Cafezinho
- Eugenia gemmiflora
- Eugenia blastantha
- Eugenia heringeriana
- Eugenia leitonii
- Concord grape (Vitis)
- Huckleberry (Vaccinium and Gaylussacia^{†})
- Several (though not all) species of:
  - Strawberry (Fragaria)
  - Blueberry (Vaccinium)
  - Cranberry (Vaccinium)
  - Raspberry (Rubus)
  - Salmonberry (Rubus)
  - Oregon grape (Mahonia)
  - Thimbleberry (Rubus)
  - Mayhaw (Crataegus)
  - Blackberry (Rubus)
  - Plum (Prunus)
  - Black cherry (Prunus)
- Chokecherry (Prunus virginiana)
- Hawthorn Berry (Crataegus)
- Staghorn Sumac (Rhus typhina)
- Prickly Pear or Cactus Pear (Opuntia ficus-indica)
- Allegheny Barberry
- Bearberry (Manzanita, Kinnikinnick)
- Black Chokeberry (often called Aronias, due to confusion with chokecherry)
- Deerberry
- Lingonberry
- Swamp dewberry (various species of Rubus, distinct from Raspberry, Blackberry, Salmonberry, Thimbleberry & Cloudberry)
- Several native species of Ribes, comprising Red Currants, Black Currants, Golden Currants and Gooseberries
- Hackberry
- Osoberry
- Multiple edible species of Viburnum, including Highbush Cranberry (Trilobum), Blackhaw (Prunifolium), Nannyberry (Lentago), and Mooseberry (Edule)
- Various species in the Prosartes line, usually called Fairybells.
- Mayapple
- Virginia Persimmon and Texas Persimmon
- Rosehips, or fruit of various wild Rosa species.
- Sand Cherry
- Fruit of select species of Aralia, also usually known as Spikenards, such as Racemosa. Not all species have safely edible fruit.
- fruits of the Gaultheria plants. Procumbens fruit is known as Teaberry, whereas Shallon is known as Salal and Hispidula is called Moxie Plum.
- Ogeechee Fruit. Most prized species of Tupelo for edibility, though all native Tupelo species have edible fruit.
- Gum Bully Olives, aka American Olives
- Beautyberry
- Buffaloberry
- Multiple Sambucus species- particularly Canadensis and Cerulea. Red Elderberry species are not considered safely edible.
- Red Mulberry
- Honeyberry is the only known edible species of Honeysuckle
- Golden berry
- Serviceberry
- Iguana hackberry

== Nuts ==
- Peanut (Arachis^{†}) commarode Peanuts
- Cashew (Anacardium^{†})
- American chestnut
- Hickory (Carya)
- Black walnut (Juglans)
- Brazil nut (Bertholletia^{†})
- Butternut or White Walnut (Juglans cinerea)
- Many species of Acorns – seeds of the genus Quercus Oak
- Baru nut
- Egg nut
- Agouti nut
- Sapucaia
- Sapucaia-mirim
- American Hazelnut

== Root vegetable ==
- Camas – several species of Camassia, also known as Hyacinths.
- Cassava – also known as Manioc or Tapioca. Native to Amazon. Domesticated and cultivated in South America, Central America and Caribbean.
- Indian Potato – roots of two native species- Apios americana and Apios priceana
- Indian yam
- American Ginseng
- Jicama
- Yacón
- Jerusalem artichoke – specific species of sunflower with large, edible root.
- Lily Bulbs- several species in Lilium family
- Oca – specific species of Oxalis, or Wood Sorrel with large edible root.
- Tobacco Root – (species of Valerian, not actual tobacco)
- Wapato – several species of Sagittaria
- Wild Onion – several native species, such as Ramps and Meadow Garlic
- Potato
- Wild Sweet Potato – roots of several native species of Ipomoea, also known as Morning Glory
- Yampah – several plants in the Perideridia family. Leaves also used as spice.

== Other ==
- Cocoa (Theobroma^{†})
- Vanilla (Vanilla)
- Jicama (Pachyrhizus^{†})
- Sunflower (Helianthus^{†})
- Avocado (Persea)
- Agave (Agave^{†})
- Pumpkin and squash (Cucurbita^{†})
- Chayote (Sechium^{†})
- Chia (Salvia)
- Maple Syrup
- Yaupon (Ilex vomitoria)
- Naranjilla
- Tomatillo
- Allspice
- Yacón
- Açai
- Bacaba
- Cocona (Solanum sessiliflorum)
- Tacaco (Sechium tacaco)

== See also ==
- Columbian Exchange
- List of food origins
- New World crops
