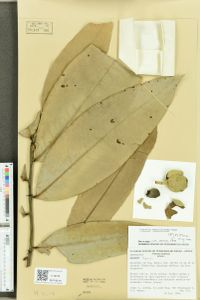

Conservation status
- Endangered (IUCN 3.1)

Scientific classification
- Kingdom: Plantae
- Clade: Tracheophytes
- Clade: Angiosperms
- Clade: Magnoliids
- Order: Magnoliales
- Family: Annonaceae
- Genus: Duguetia
- Species: D. magnolioidea

Binomial name
- Duguetia magnolioidea Maas

= Duguetia magnolioidea =

Species of flowering plant

Duguetia magnolioidea is a species of tree native to northeastern Brazil. It has a green, ellipsoid fruit.

== Description ==
The tree grows to be around 3 to 8 m (9.8 to 26.2 ft) in height and 2 to 8 cm (0.79 to 3.15 in) in diameter. The petioles are 5–10 by 3 millimetres (0.20 in–0.39 in × 0.12 in), and are, with the twigs, covered entirely with white hairs that are 0.2–0.8 millimetres (0.0079–0.0315 in) in diameter.

The leaves are narrow and elliptic to ovate with an acute to obtuse base, being 18–25 by 5–8 centimetres (7.1 in–9.8 in × 2.0 in–3.1 in). They are greenish-gray on the top with a brown underside, and are coriaceous, and verrucose. They are covered with multiple stellate hairs that are 0.1–0.8 millimetres (0.0039–0.0315 in) in diameter.

== Distribution ==
Duguetia magnolioidea is endemic to Bahia, a state of Brazil, where it grows near sea level in sandy soil. It populates the same general area as D. chrysocarpa.
