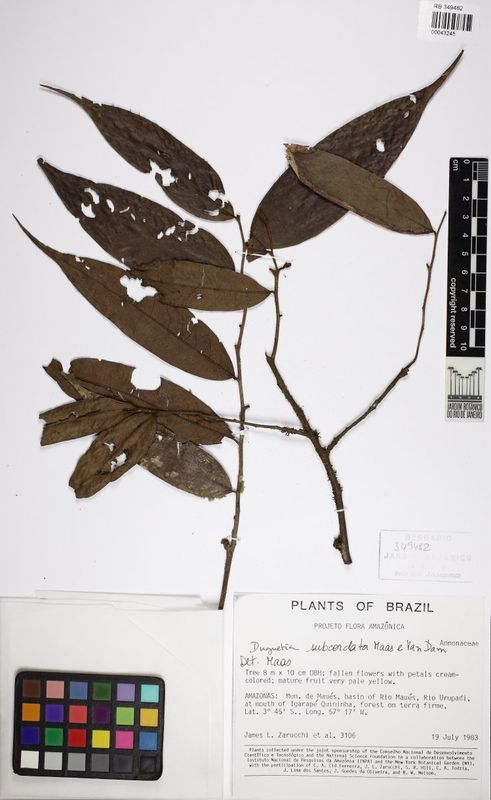

Conservation status
- Endangered (IUCN 3.1)

Scientific classification
- Kingdom: Plantae
- Clade: Tracheophytes
- Clade: Angiosperms
- Clade: Magnoliids
- Order: Magnoliales
- Family: Annonaceae
- Genus: Duguetia
- Species: D. subcordata

Binomial name
- Duguetia subcordata Paul Maas & J.A.C.Dam

= Duguetia subcordata =

Species of flowering plant

Duguetia subcordata is a species of flowering tree in the family Annonaceae. It is native to northern Brazil, specifically occurring in the states of Amazonas and Pará. The tree typically grows to a height of 5 to 9 m (16 to 30 ft), with a trunk diameter ranging between 6 and 10 cm (2.4 and 3.9 in).

The species was described in 1996, by Paul Maas and J.A.C. van Dam.
