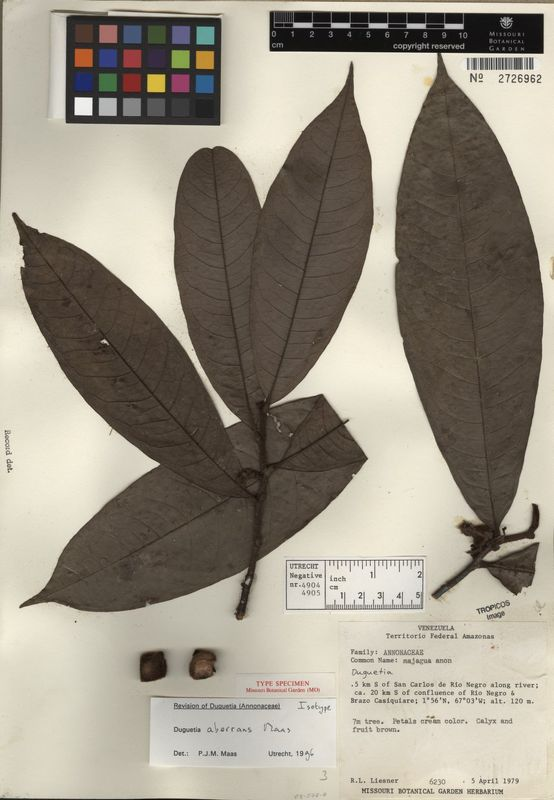

Conservation status
- Endangered (IUCN 3.1)

Scientific classification
- Kingdom: Plantae
- Clade: Embryophytes
- Clade: Tracheophytes
- Clade: Spermatophytes
- Clade: Angiosperms
- Clade: Magnoliids
- Order: Magnoliales
- Family: Annonaceae
- Genus: Duguetia
- Species: D. aberrans

Binomial name
- Duguetia aberrans Maas

= Duguetia aberrans =

Species of flowering plant

Duguetia aberrans is a species of flowering tree native to southern Venezuela. It grows to be 4 to 7 meters tall. It is primarily present in areas with an elevation of around 120 m (390 ft), and is endemic the area surrounding the town of San Carlos de Río Negro.
