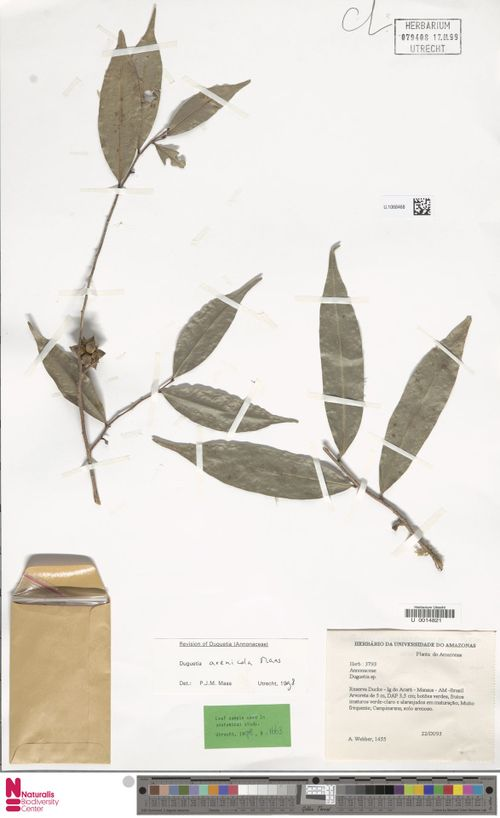

Conservation status
- Vulnerable (IUCN 3.1)

Scientific classification
- Kingdom: Plantae
- Clade: Embryophytes
- Clade: Tracheophytes
- Clade: Spermatophytes
- Clade: Angiosperms
- Clade: Magnoliids
- Order: Magnoliales
- Family: Annonaceae
- Genus: Duguetia
- Species: D. arenicola

Binomial name
- Duguetia arenicola Maas

= Duguetia arenicola =

Species of flowering plant

Duguetia arenicola is a species of flowering tree. It is native to the Amazonas state of Brazil. It can grow to be 1.5 to 4 m (5 to 13 ft) tall and 2 to 5 cm (0.8 to 2.0 in) in diameter. Its leaves are 8 to 10 cm (3.1 to 3.9 in) in length. It has a small fruit with only 10 to 20 carpels.
