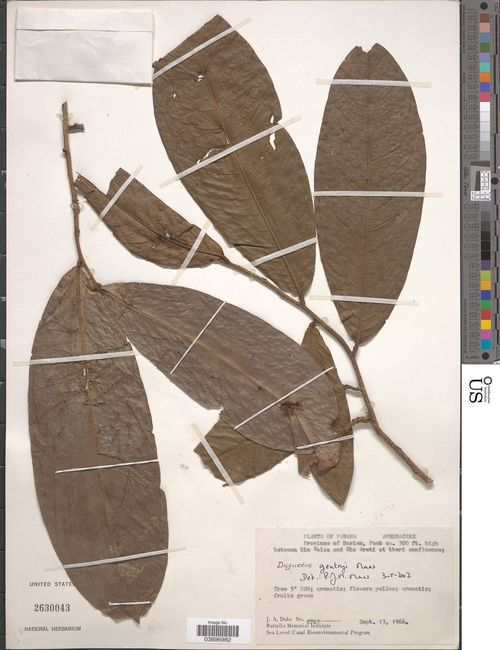

Conservation status
- Vulnerable (IUCN 3.1)

Scientific classification
- Kingdom: Plantae
- Clade: Embryophytes
- Clade: Tracheophytes
- Clade: Spermatophytes
- Clade: Angiosperms
- Clade: Magnoliids
- Order: Magnoliales
- Family: Annonaceae
- Genus: Duguetia
- Species: D. gentryi

Binomial name
- Duguetia gentryi Maas

= Duguetia gentryi =

Species of flowering plant

Duguetia gentryi is a species of small, flowering shrub. It is native to Colombia and Panama. It can grow to be 13–15 m (43–49 ft) tall and 9 to 12 cm (3.5 to 4.7 in) in diameter.
