= Duguetia chrysea =

Conservation status
- Near Threatened (IUCN 3.1)

Scientific classification
- Kingdom: Plantae
- Clade: Tracheophytes
- Clade: Angiosperms
- Clade: Magnoliids
- Order: Magnoliales
- Family: Annonaceae
- Genus: Duguetia
- Species: D. chrysea

Binomial name
- Duguetia chrysea Maas

Species of flowering plant

Duguetia chrysea is a tree in the family Annonaceae. It is native to southwestern Guyana and Amazonas state in northern Brazil.
