= Duguetia caniflora =

Conservation status
- Endangered (IUCN 3.1)

Scientific classification
- Kingdom: Plantae
- Clade: Tracheophytes
- Clade: Angiosperms
- Clade: Magnoliids
- Order: Magnoliales
- Family: Annonaceae
- Genus: Duguetia
- Species: D. caniflora

Binomial name
- Duguetia caniflora H.León & Maas

Species of flowering plant

Duguetia caniflora is a tree in the family Annonaceae. Its endemic to Colombia.
