= Duguetia colombiana =

Conservation status
- Vulnerable (IUCN 3.1)

Scientific classification
- Kingdom: Plantae
- Clade: Tracheophytes
- Clade: Angiosperms
- Clade: Magnoliids
- Order: Magnoliales
- Family: Annonaceae
- Genus: Duguetia
- Species: D. colombiana

Binomial name
- Duguetia colombiana Maas

Species of plant

Duguetia colombiana is a tree in the family Annonaceae. Its native range is Colombia. It is native to the Magdalena Valley in the northern Andes where it is found in Antioquia, Caldas, and Santander departments. It grows in lowland and premontane tropical moist forest from 300 to 500 metres elevation.
