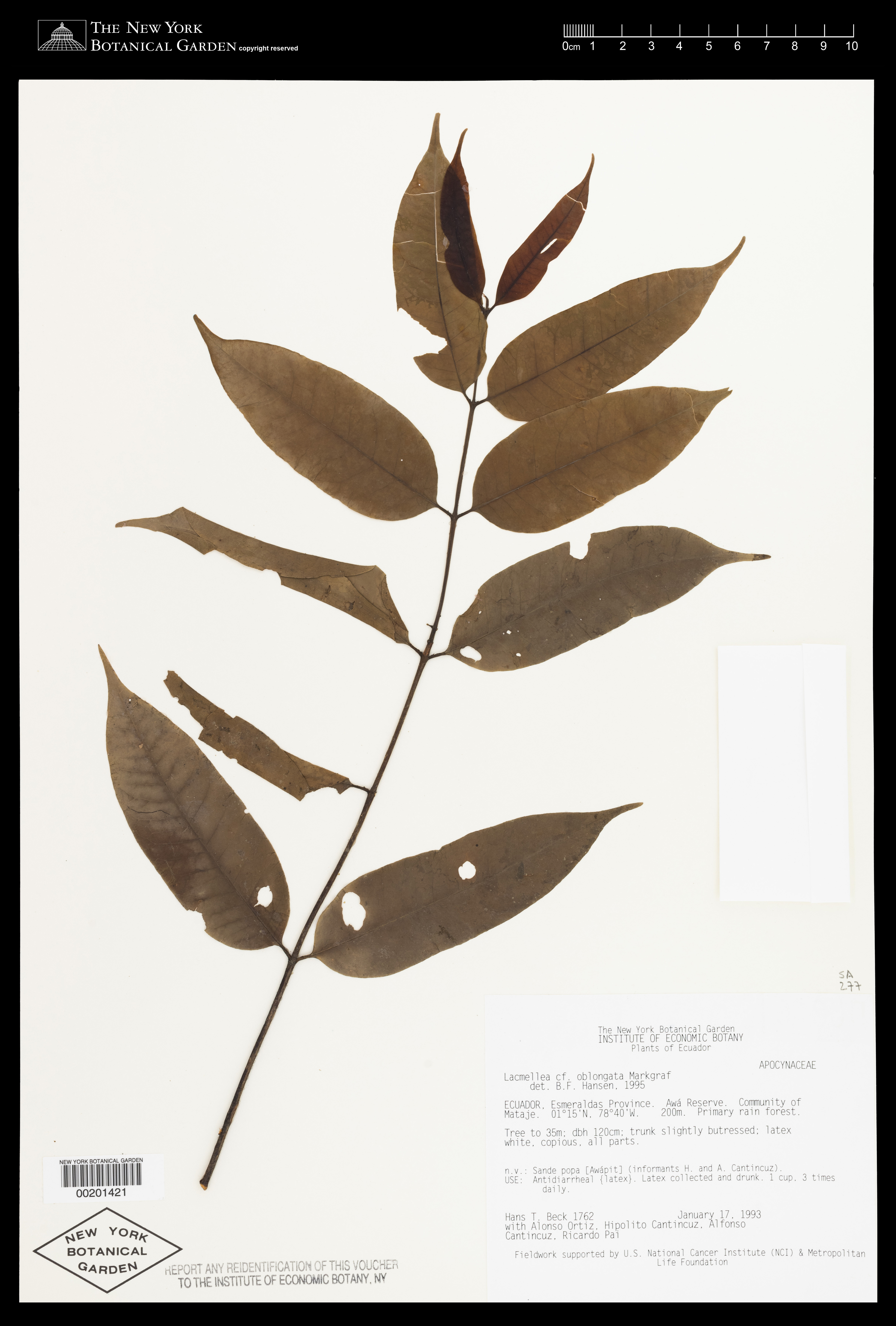

Conservation status
- Least Concern (IUCN 3.1)

Scientific classification
- Kingdom: Plantae
- Clade: Tracheophytes
- Clade: Angiosperms
- Clade: Eudicots
- Clade: Asterids
- Order: Gentianales
- Family: Apocynaceae
- Genus: Lacmellea
- Species: L. oblongata

Binomial name
- Lacmellea oblongata Markgf.

Synonyms
- Heterotypic Synonyms: Lacmellea grandiflora Monach.

= Lacmellea oblongata =

Species of plant

Lacmellea oblongata is a species of tree in the family Apocynaceae. It is native to south-eastern Colombia, Ecuador and Peru. Along with other species such as Lacmellea edulis, it is known in Spanish as the chicle muyu or chicle muyo. The tree is utilized for its edible fruit and latex.
