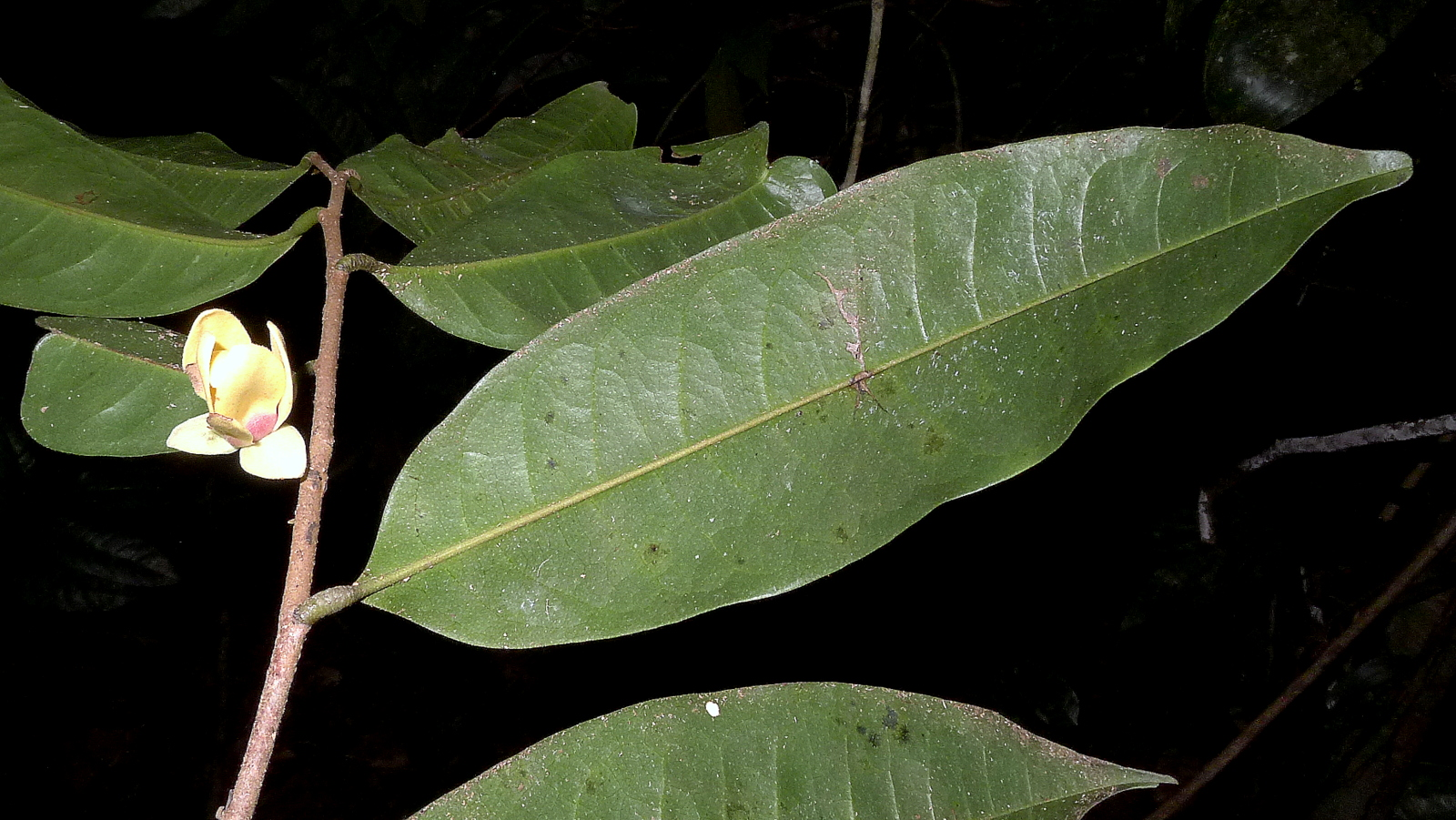

Conservation status
- Vulnerable (IUCN 3.1)

Scientific classification
- Kingdom: Plantae
- Clade: Embryophytes
- Clade: Tracheophytes
- Clade: Spermatophytes
- Clade: Angiosperms
- Clade: Magnoliids
- Order: Magnoliales
- Family: Annonaceae
- Genus: Duguetia
- Species: D. bahiensis

Binomial name
- Duguetia bahiensis Maas

Synonyms
- Aberemoa bracteosa (Mart.) R.E.Fr.; Duguetia bracteosa Mart.; Uvaria sessilis R.E.Fries

= Duguetia bahiensis =

Species of flowering plant

Duguetia bahiensis is a species of flowering tree. It is native to Bahia and Espírito Santo.
