= Duguetia decurrens =

Scientific classification
- Kingdom: Plantae
- Clade: Tracheophytes
- Clade: Angiosperms
- Clade: Magnoliids
- Order: Magnoliales
- Family: Annonaceae
- Genus: Duguetia
- Species: D. decurrens

Binomial name
- Duguetia decurrens R.E.Fr.

Species of plant

Duguetia decurrens is a tree in the family Annonaceae. Its native range is West Guyana.
