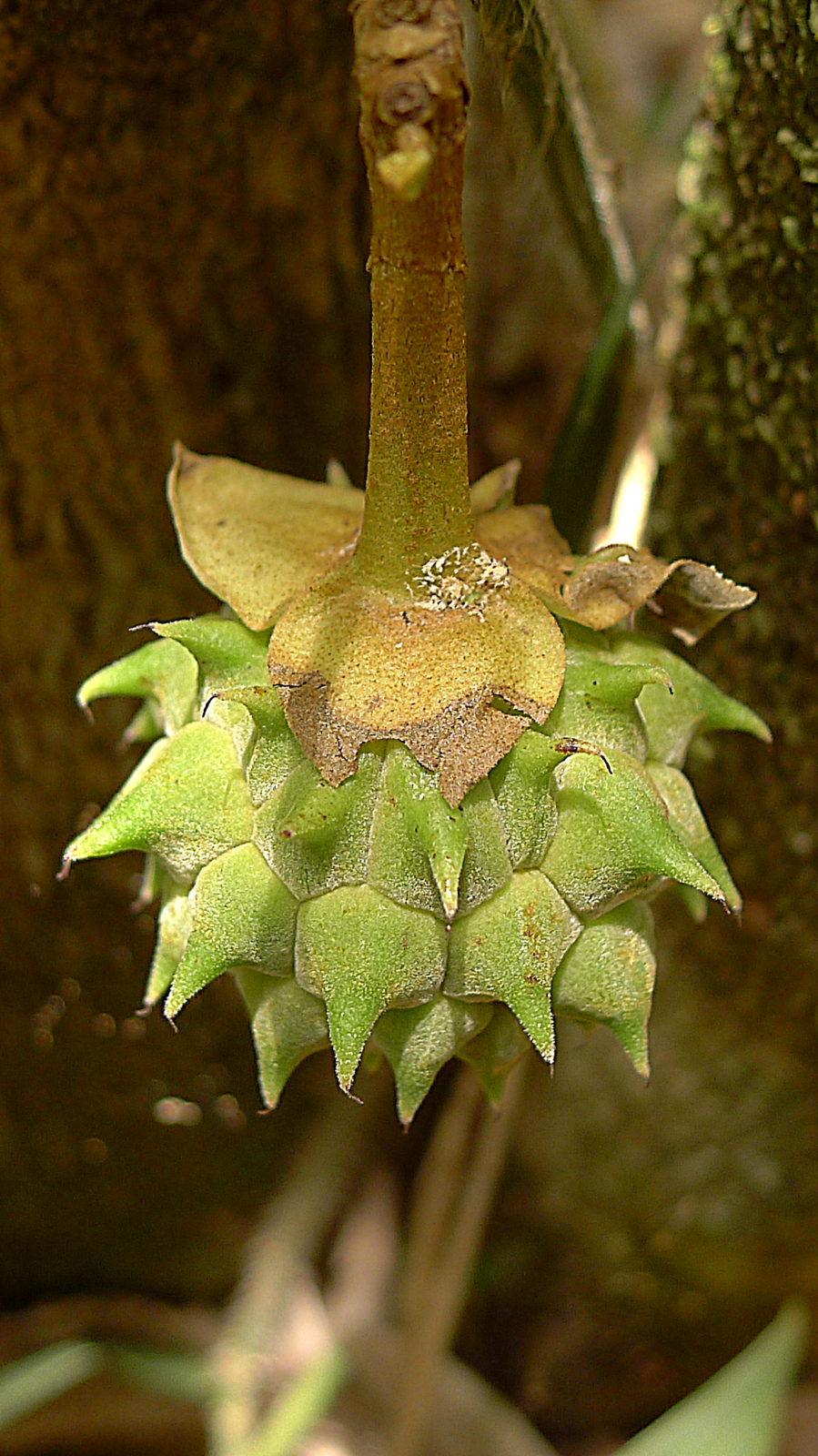

Scientific classification
- Kingdom: Plantae
- Clade: Tracheophytes
- Clade: Angiosperms
- Clade: Magnoliids
- Order: Magnoliales
- Family: Annonaceae
- Genus: Duguetia; A.St.-Hil.

Synonyms
- Alcmene Urb.; Duquetia G.Don; Geanthemum (R.E.Fr.) Saff.; Pachypodanthium Engl. & Diels

= Duguetia =

Genus of flowering plants

Duguetia is a genus of trees and shrubs in the custard apple family Annonaceae, with approximately 100 species in Central and South America and West Africa.

== Species ==
The following 97 species are accepted by Plants of the World Online as of June 2026:

- Duguetia aberrans Maas
- Duguetia amplexifolia R.E.Fr.
- Duguetia antioquensis H.León & Maas
- Duguetia arenicola Maas
- Duguetia argentea (R.E.Fr.) R.E.Fr.
- Duguetia aripuanae Maas
- Duguetia asterotricha (Diels) R.E.Fr.
- Duguetia bahiensis Maas
- Duguetia barteri (Benth.) Chatrou
- Duguetia cadaverica Huber
- Duguetia calycina Benoist
- Duguetia caniflora H.León & Maas
- Duguetia cauliflora R.E.Fr.
- Duguetia chrysea Maas
- Duguetia chrysocarpa Maas
- Duguetia colombiana Maas
- Duguetia confinis (Engl. & Diels) Chatrou
- Duguetia confusa Maas
- Duguetia decurrens R.E.Fr.
- Duguetia dicholepidota Mart.
- Duguetia dilabens Chatrou & Repetur
- Duguetia dimorphopetala R.E.Fr.
- Duguetia duckei R.E.Fr.
- Duguetia echinophora R.E.Fr.
- Duguetia elliptica R.E.Fr.
- Duguetia eximia Diels
- Duguetia flagellaris Huber
- Duguetia furfuracea (A.St.-Hil.) Saff.
- Duguetia gardneriana Mart.
- Duguetia gentryi Maas
- Duguetia glabriuscula (R.E.Fr.) R.E.Fr.
- Duguetia granvilleana Maas
- Duguetia guianensis R.E.Fr.
- Duguetia hadrantha (Diels) R.E.Fr.
- Duguetia inconspicua Sagot
- Duguetia lanceolata A.St.-Hil.
- Duguetia latifolia R.E.Fr.
- Duguetia lepidota (Miq.) Pulle
- Duguetia leucotricha M.L.Bazante & Maas
- Duguetia longicuspis Benth.
- Duguetia lucida Urb.
- Duguetia macrocalyx R.E.Fr.
- Duguetia macrophylla R.E.Fr.
- Duguetia magnolioidea Maas
- Duguetia manausensis Maas & Boon
- Duguetia marcgraviana Mart.
- Duguetia megalocarpa Maas
- Duguetia megalophylla R.E.Fr.
- Duguetia microphylla (R.E.Fr.) R.E.Fr.
- Duguetia moricandiana Mart.
- Duguetia neglecta Sandwith
- Duguetia nitida Maas
- Duguetia oblanceolata R.E.Fr.
- Duguetia oblongifolia R.E.Fr.
- Duguetia odorata (Diels) J.F.Macbr.
- Duguetia oligocarpa Maas & J.A.C.Dam
- Duguetia panamensis Standl.
- Duguetia paraensis R.E.Fr.
- Duguetia pauciflora Rusby
- Duguetia peruviana (R.E.Fr.) J.F.Macbr.
- Duguetia phaeoclados (Mart.) Maas & Rainer
- Duguetia pohliana Mart.
- Duguetia pycnastera Sandwith
- Duguetia quitarensis Benth.
- Duguetia restingae Maas
- Duguetia reticulata Maas
- Duguetia riberensis Aristeg. ex Maas & Boon
- Duguetia riedeliana R.E.Fr.
- Duguetia rigida R.E.Fr.
- Duguetia rionegrensis Zuilen & Maas
- Duguetia riparia Huber
- Duguetia rolimii M.L.Bazante, G.S.Siqueira & Maas
- Duguetia rotundifolia R.E.Fr.
- Duguetia ruboides Maas & He
- Duguetia salicifolia R.E.Fr.
- Duguetia sancticaroli Maas
- Duguetia schulzii Jans.-Jac.
- Duguetia scottmorii Maas
- Duguetia sessilis (Vell.) Maas
- Duguetia sooretamae Maas
- Duguetia spixiana Mart.
- Duguetia staudtii (Engl. & Diels) Chatrou
- Duguetia stelechantha (Diels) R.E.Fr.
- Duguetia stenantha R.E.Fr.
- Duguetia subcordata Maas & J.A.C.Dam
- Duguetia sulcosa M.L.Bazante & M.Alves
- Duguetia surinamensis R.E.Fr.
- Duguetia tenuis R.E.Fr.
- Duguetia tobagensis (Urb.) R.E.Fr.
- Duguetia trunciflora Maas & A.H.Gentry
- Duguetia tuberculata Maas
- Duguetia ulei (Diels) R.E.Fr.
- Duguetia uniflora (DC.) Mart.
- Duguetia vallicola J.F.Macbr.
- Duguetia vaupesana Westra & Maas
- Duguetia venezuelana R.E.Fr.
- Duguetia yeshidan Sandwith
