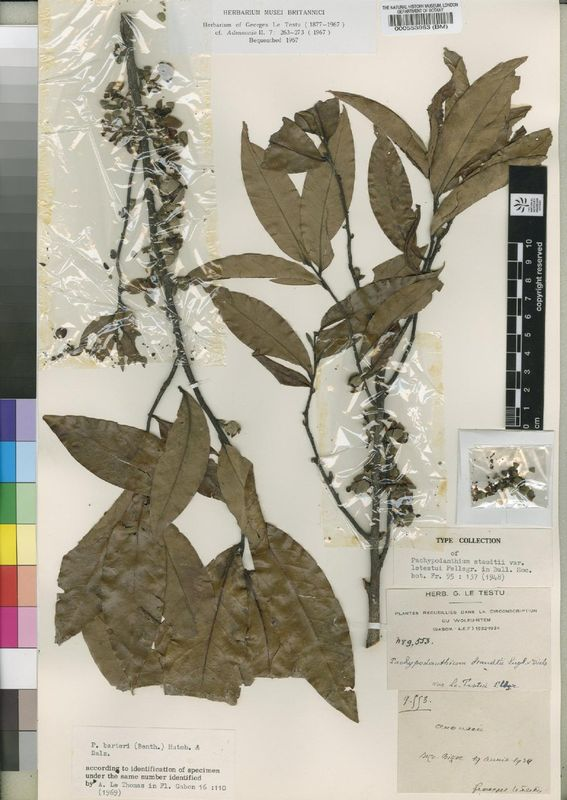

Conservation status
- Least Concern (IUCN 3.1)

Scientific classification
- Kingdom: Plantae
- Clade: Tracheophytes
- Clade: Angiosperms
- Clade: Magnoliids
- Order: Magnoliales
- Family: Annonaceae
- Genus: Duguetia
- Species: D. barteri

Binomial name
- Duguetia barteri (Benth.) Chatrou

Synonyms
- Annona barteri Benth.; Pachypodanthium barteri (Benth.) Hutch. & Dalziel; Pachypodanthium staudtii var. letestui Pellegr.

= Duguetia barteri =

Species of flowering plant

Duguetia barteri is a species of flowering tree native to Cameroon, Republic of the Congo, Democratic Republic of the Congo, Equatorial Guinea, Gabon, Côte d'Ivoire, and Nigeria. It grows to be 8 to 40 m (26 to 131 ft) tall and 40 to 60 cm (16 to 24 in) in diameter.
