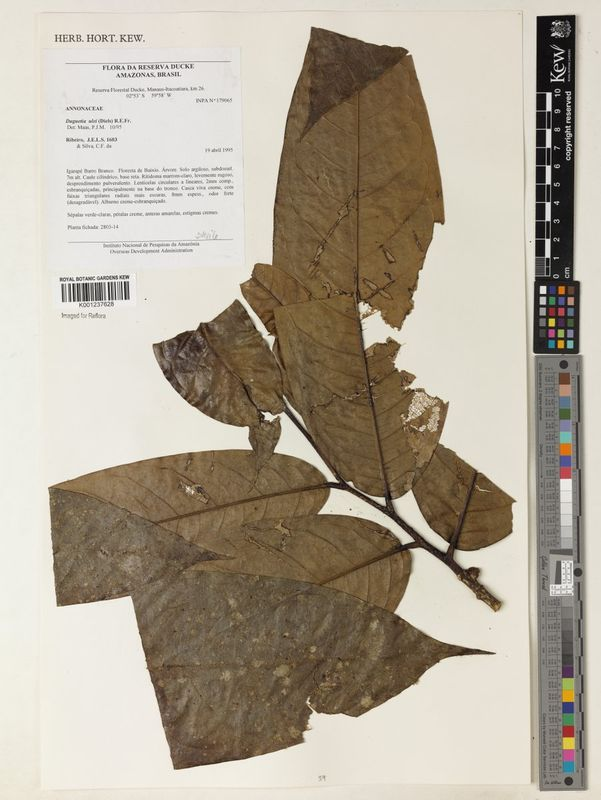

Conservation status
- Near Threatened (IUCN 3.1)

Scientific classification
- Kingdom: Plantae
- Clade: Embryophytes
- Clade: Tracheophytes
- Clade: Angiosperms
- Clade: Magnoliids
- Order: Magnoliales
- Family: Annonaceae
- Genus: Duguetia
- Species: D. ulei

Binomial name
- Duguetia ulei (Diels) R.E.Fr.

= Duguetia ulei =

Species of flowering plant

Duguetia ulei is a species of flowering tree in the family Annonaceae. It is native to Northern Brazil and Colombia. It is 2 to 10 meters tall and up to 25 centimeters in diameter.
