= Duguetia amplexifolia =

Conservation status
- Data Deficient (IUCN 3.1)

Scientific classification
- Kingdom: Plantae
- Clade: Tracheophytes
- Clade: Angiosperms
- Clade: Magnoliids
- Order: Magnoliales
- Family: Annonaceae
- Genus: Duguetia
- Species: D. amplexifolia

Binomial name
- Duguetia amplexifolia R.E.Fr.

Species of flowering plant

Duguetia amplexifolia is a species of plant in the Annonaceae family. It is a tree endemic to Suriname.
