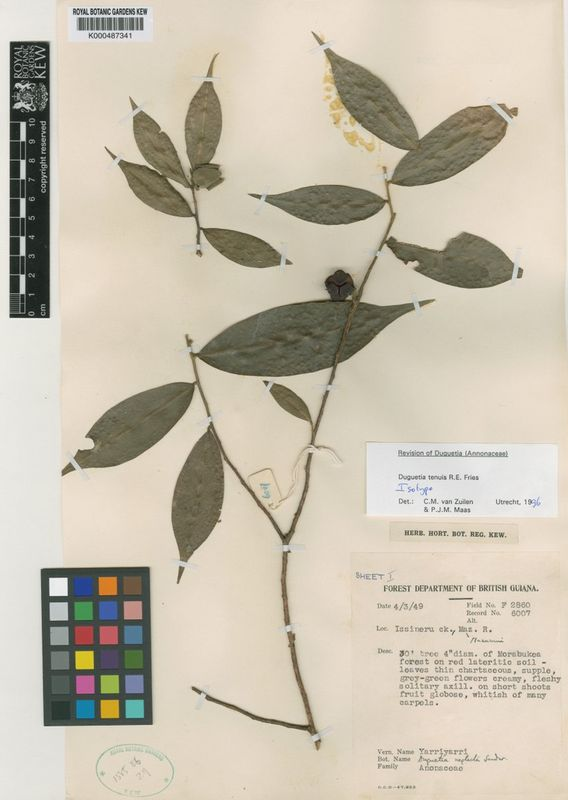

Conservation status
- Data Deficient (IUCN 3.1)

Scientific classification
- Kingdom: Plantae
- Clade: Embryophytes
- Clade: Tracheophytes
- Clade: Angiosperms
- Clade: Magnoliids
- Order: Magnoliales
- Family: Annonaceae
- Genus: Duguetia
- Species: D. tenuis

Binomial name
- Duguetia tenuis R.E.Fr.

= Duguetia tenuis =

Species of flowering plant

Duguetia tenuis is a species of flowering tree in the family Annonaceae. It is native to Northern Brazil, Guyana, and Venezuela. It grows to be 3 to 9 m (9.8 to 29.5 ft) tall and is 10 cm (3.9 in) in diameter.
