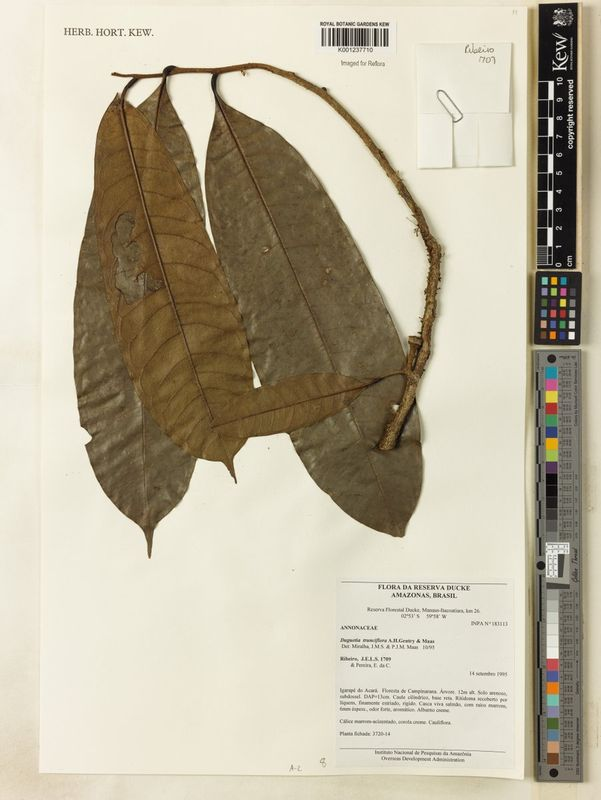

Conservation status
- Least Concern (IUCN 3.1)

Scientific classification
- Kingdom: Plantae
- Clade: Embryophytes
- Clade: Tracheophytes
- Clade: Angiosperms
- Clade: Magnoliids
- Order: Magnoliales
- Family: Annonaceae
- Genus: Duguetia
- Species: D. trunciflora

Binomial name
- Duguetia trunciflora Maas & A. H. Gentry

= Duguetia trunciflora =

Species of flowering plant

Duguetia trunciflora is a species of flowering tree in the family Annonaceae. It is native to Brazil, Colombia, French Guiana, Peru, and Venezuela. It is 2 to 15 m (6.6 to 49.2 ft) tall and 5 to 20 cm (2 to 8 in) in trunk diameter.
