= Duguetia antioquensis =

Conservation status
- Least Concern (IUCN 3.1)

Scientific classification
- Kingdom: Plantae
- Clade: Tracheophytes
- Clade: Angiosperms
- Clade: Magnoliids
- Order: Magnoliales
- Family: Annonaceae
- Genus: Duguetia
- Species: D. antioquensis

Binomial name
- Duguetia antioquensis H.León & Maas

Species of flowering plant

Duguetia antioquensis is a species of plant in the Annonaceae family. It is a tree endemic to Colombia. It is known from Antioquia, Boyacá, Chocó, Santander departments, where it grows in lowland tropical moist forest up to 1250 metres elevation.
