= Duguetia confusa =

Conservation status
- Least Concern (IUCN 3.1)

Scientific classification
- Kingdom: Plantae
- Clade: Tracheophytes
- Clade: Angiosperms
- Clade: Magnoliids
- Order: Magnoliales
- Family: Annonaceae
- Genus: Duguetia
- Species: D. confusa

Binomial name
- Duguetia confusa Maas

Species of tree

Duguetia confusa is a tree in the family Annonaceae. Its native range is Nicaragua through Costa Rica and Panama to Colombia. It grows in lowland rain forest.
