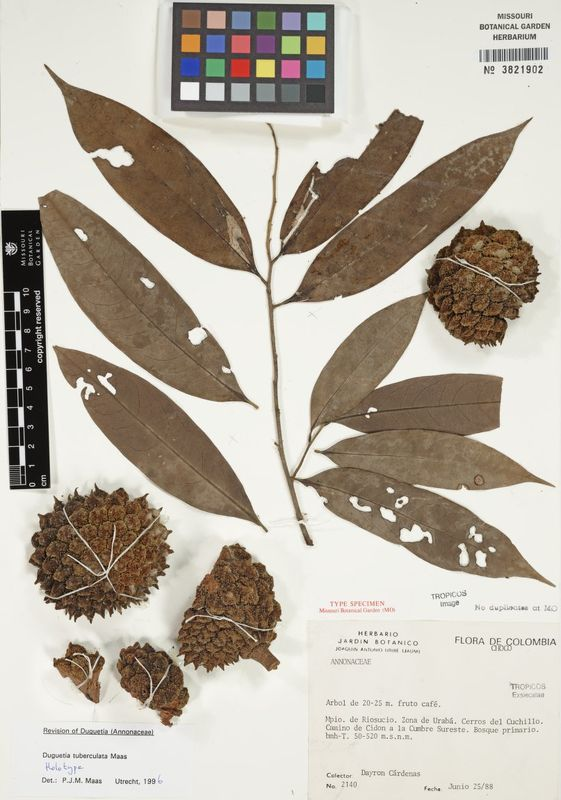

Conservation status
- Endangered (IUCN 3.1)

Scientific classification
- Kingdom: Plantae
- Clade: Embryophytes
- Clade: Tracheophytes
- Clade: Angiosperms
- Clade: Magnoliids
- Order: Magnoliales
- Family: Annonaceae
- Genus: Duguetia
- Species: D. tuberculata

Binomial name
- Duguetia tuberculata Maas

= Duguetia tuberculata =

Species of flowering plant

Duguetia tuberculata is a species of flowering tree in the family Annonaceae. It is native to Panama and Colombia. It is 15 to 30 meters tall. The elevation range is from 0 to 850 meters.
