= Duguetia sulcosa =

Scientific classification
- Kingdom: Plantae
- Clade: Embryophytes
- Clade: Tracheophytes
- Clade: Angiosperms
- Clade: Magnoliids
- Order: Magnoliales
- Family: Annonaceae
- Genus: Duguetia
- Species: D. sulcosa

Binomial name
- Duguetia sulcosa M.L.Bazante & M.Alves

Species of flowering plant

Duguetia sulcosa is a species of flowering tree in the family Annonaceae. It is native to northeastern Brazil, specifically in the states of Pernambuco and Alagoas.
