= Duguetia chrysocarpa =

Conservation status
- Least Concern (IUCN 3.1)

Scientific classification
- Kingdom: Plantae
- Clade: Tracheophytes
- Clade: Angiosperms
- Clade: Magnoliids
- Order: Magnoliales
- Family: Annonaceae
- Genus: Duguetia
- Species: D. chrysocarpa

Binomial name
- Duguetia chrysocarpa Maas

Species of flowering plant

Duguetia chrysocarpa is a tree in the family Annonaceae. It is native to the Atlantic Forest of eastern Brazil.
