= Duguetia rolimii =

Scientific classification
- Kingdom: Plantae
- Clade: Embryophytes
- Clade: Tracheophytes
- Clade: Spermatophytes
- Clade: Angiosperms
- Clade: Magnoliids
- Order: Magnoliales
- Family: Annonaceae
- Genus: Duguetia
- Species: D. rolimii

Binomial name
- Duguetia rolimii M.L.Bazante, G.S.Siqueira & Maas

Species of flowering plant

Duguetia rolimii is a species of tree endemic to Brazil, known from two mature specimens. It grows to be 20 to 22 m (66 to 72 ft) in height and 120 to 130 cm (47 to 51 in) in diameter. It is not cauliflorous.
