= Duguetia dicholepidota =

Scientific classification
- Kingdom: Plantae
- Clade: Tracheophytes
- Clade: Angiosperms
- Clade: Magnoliids
- Order: Magnoliales
- Family: Annonaceae
- Genus: Duguetia
- Species: D. dicholepidota

Binomial name
- Duguetia dicholepidota Mart.

Species of plant

Duguetia dicholepidota is a tree in the family Annonaceae. Its native range is Brazil.
