= Duguetia calycina =

Conservation status
- Least Concern (IUCN 3.1)

Scientific classification
- Kingdom: Plantae
- Clade: Tracheophytes
- Clade: Angiosperms
- Clade: Magnoliids
- Order: Magnoliales
- Family: Annonaceae
- Genus: Duguetia
- Species: D. calycina

Binomial name
- Duguetia calycina Benoist

Synonyms
- Duguetia calycina subsp. jenmanii R.E.Fr.; Duguetia calycina subsp. versteegii R.E.Fr.; Duguetia cuspidata R.E.Fr; Duguetia elegans R.E.Fr.

Species of flowering plant

Duguetia calycina is a species of tree in the family Annonaceae. Its native range is northern South America.
