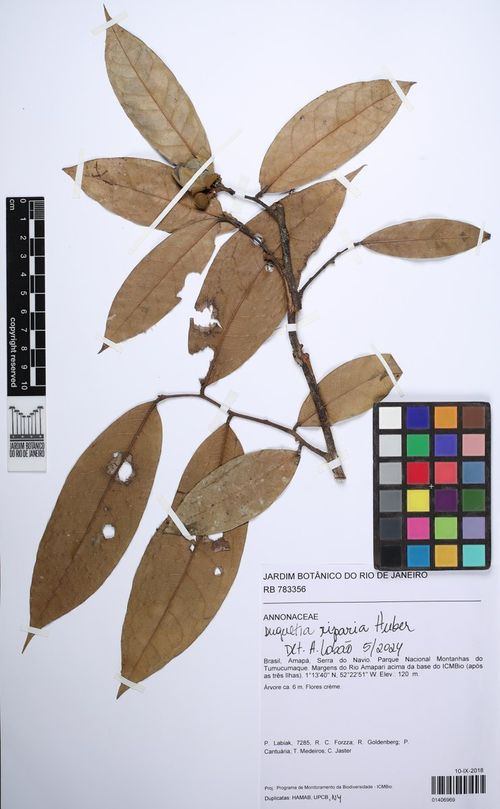

Conservation status
- Least Concern (IUCN 3.1)

Scientific classification
- Kingdom: Plantae
- Clade: Embryophytes
- Clade: Tracheophytes
- Clade: Spermatophytes
- Clade: Angiosperms
- Clade: Magnoliids
- Order: Magnoliales
- Family: Annonaceae
- Genus: Duguetia
- Species: D. riparia

Binomial name
- Duguetia riparia Huber

= Duguetia riparia =

Species of flowering plant

Duguetia riparia is a species of flowering tree native to Bolivia, North and Northeastern Brazil, Colombia, French Guiana, and Suriname. It grows to be 3 to 10 m (10 to 33 ft) tall and 2.5 to 15 cm (1.0 to 5.9 in) in diameter. Some of its local names, in Portuguese, are Envira, Makahy-myra, Envira preta, Envira-tai, and Araticu da mata.
