= Duguetia argentea =

Conservation status
- Least Concern (IUCN 3.1)

Scientific classification
- Kingdom: Plantae
- Clade: Embryophytes
- Clade: Tracheophytes
- Clade: Angiosperms
- Clade: Magnoliids
- Order: Magnoliales
- Family: Annonaceae
- Genus: Duguetia
- Species: D. argentea

Binomial name
- Duguetia argentea (R.E.Fr.) R.E.Fr.

Synonyms
- Aberemoa argentea R.E.Fr.; Duguetia amazonica R.E.Fr.

Species of flowering plant

Duguetia argentea is a tree in the Annonaceae family. Its native range is from Colombia to north Brazil.
