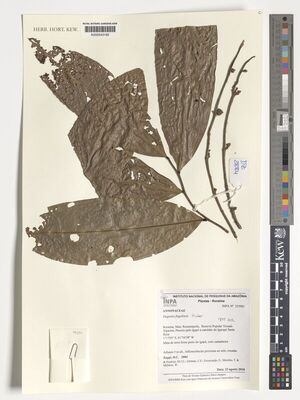

Conservation status
- Least Concern (IUCN 3.1)

Scientific classification
- Kingdom: Plantae
- Clade: Embryophytes
- Clade: Tracheophytes
- Clade: Spermatophytes
- Clade: Angiosperms
- Clade: Magnoliids
- Order: Magnoliales
- Family: Annonaceae
- Genus: Duguetia
- Species: D. flagellaris

Binomial name
- Duguetia flagellaris Huber

Synonyms
- Duguetia heteroclada R.E.Fr.; Duguetia trichostemon R.E.Fr.

= Duguetia flagellaris =

Species of flowering plant

Duguetia flagellaris is a species of small, flowering shrub. It is native to northern, northeastern, southeastern, and west-central Brazil, Colombia, Ecuador, French Guiana, Peru, Venezuela, and Bolivia. It grows to be 1.5 to 10 m (5 to 33 ft) tall and 2 to 10 cm (0.8 to 3.9 in) in diameter.
