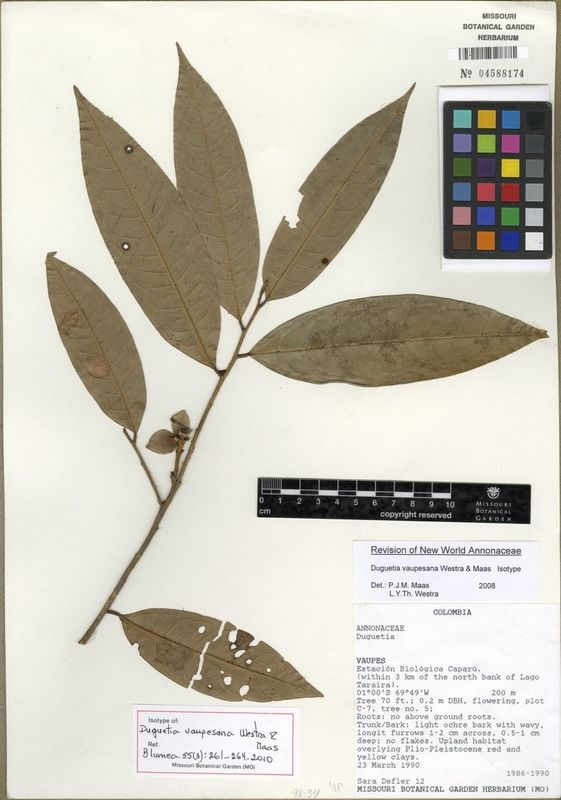

Conservation status
- Data Deficient (IUCN 3.1)

Scientific classification
- Kingdom: Plantae
- Clade: Embryophytes
- Clade: Tracheophytes
- Clade: Spermatophytes
- Clade: Angiosperms
- Clade: Magnoliids
- Order: Magnoliales
- Family: Annonaceae
- Genus: Duguetia
- Species: D. vaupesana

Binomial name
- Duguetia vaupesana Westra & Maas

= Duguetia vaupesana =

Species of flowering plant

Duguetia vaupesana is a species of flowering tree from the family Annonaceae. It is native to Colombia.
