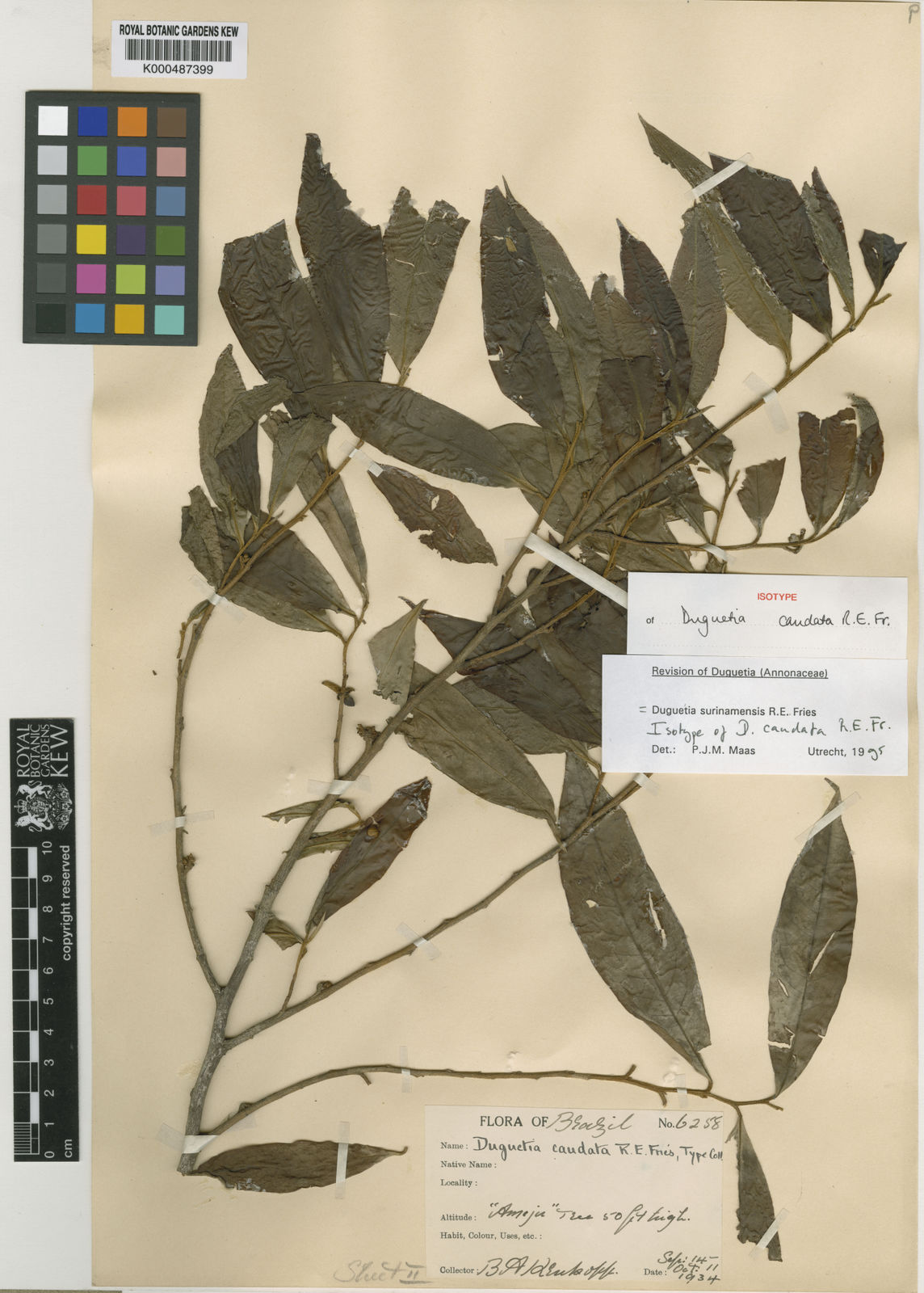

Conservation status
- Least Concern (IUCN 3.1)

Scientific classification
- Kingdom: Plantae
- Clade: Embryophytes
- Clade: Tracheophytes
- Clade: Spermatophytes
- Clade: Angiosperms
- Clade: Magnoliids
- Order: Magnoliales
- Family: Annonaceae
- Genus: Duguetia
- Species: D. surinamensis

Binomial name
- Duguetia surinamensis R.E.Fr.

= Duguetia surinamensis =

Species of flowering plant

Duguetia surinamensis is a species of tree or rarely a shrub native to northern Brazil, Colombia, Ecuador, French Guiana, Guyana, Peru, and Suriname. Its native habitat is in lowland tropical rainforests. It can grow to be 10 to 30 m (33 to 98 ft) in height and 40 to 75 cm (16 to 30 in) in diameter.
