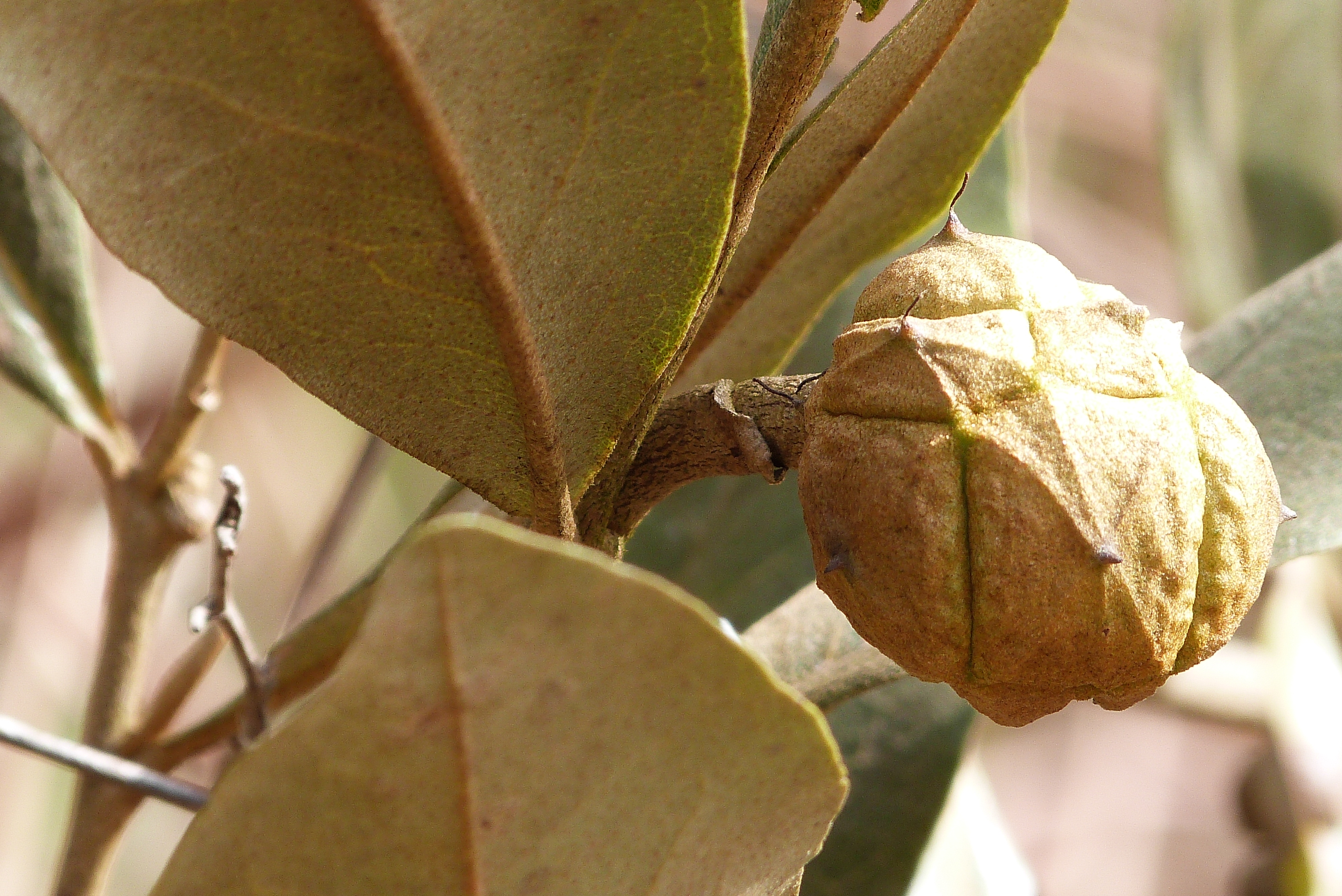

Conservation status
- Least Concern (IUCN 3.1)

Scientific classification
- Kingdom: Plantae
- Clade: Embryophytes
- Clade: Tracheophytes
- Clade: Spermatophytes
- Clade: Angiosperms
- Clade: Magnoliids
- Order: Magnoliales
- Family: Annonaceae
- Genus: Duguetia
- Species: D. furfuracea

Binomial name
- Duguetia furfuracea (A.St.-Hil.) Saff.

Synonyms
- Aberemoa furfuracea (A.St.-Hil.) Barb.Rodr.; Aberemoa furfuracea var. jonasiana Barb.Rodr.; Aberemoa jonasiana (Barb.Rodr.) R.E.Fr.; Annona furfuracea A.St.-Hil. (1824); Duguetia coriacea Sond.; Duguetia hemmendorffii R.E.Fr.; Duguetia jonasiana (Barb.Rodr.) R.E.Fr.

= Duguetia furfuracea =

Species of flowering plant

Duguetia furfuracea is a species of flowering shrub native to Bolivia, Brazil, and Paraguay. It grows to be 0.5 to 2 meters in height. It is traditionally used as a folk medicine to treat pain and inflammation.
