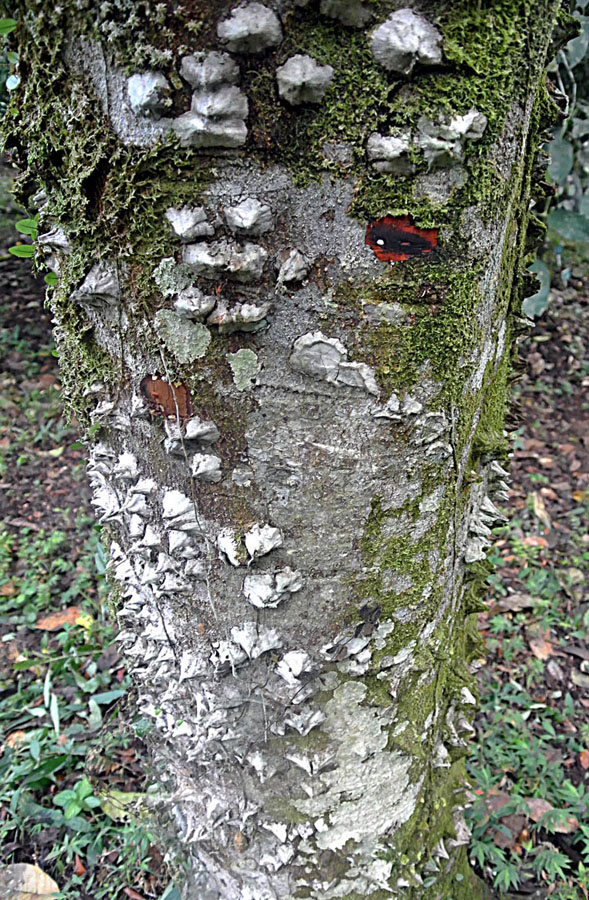
- Lacmella lactescens

Scientific classification
- Kingdom: Plantae
- Clade: Tracheophytes
- Clade: Angiosperms
- Clade: Eudicots
- Clade: Asterids
- Order: Gentianales
- Family: Apocynaceae
- Subfamily: Rauvolfioideae
- Tribe: Willughbeieae
- Subtribe: Lacmelleinae
- Genus: Lacmellea; H.Karst.

Synonyms
- Zschokkea Müll.Arg.

= Lacmellea =

Genus of plants

Lacmellea is a genus of flowering plants in the family Apocynaceae first described as a genus in 1857. It is native to South America and Central America.

Species

1. Lacmellea abbreviata J.F.Morales - Colombia
2. Lacmellea aculeata (Ducke) Monach - Peru, NW Brazil, the Guianas
3. Lacmellea arborescens (Müll.Arg.) Markgr. - Brazil, Bolivia
4. Lacmellea bahiensis J.F.Morales - Bahia
5. Lacmellea costanensis Steyerm. - N Venezuela
6. Lacmellea densifoliata (Ducke) Markgr. - Pará
7. Lacmellea edulis H.Karst. - Panama, Venezuela, Colombia, Ecuador, Peru, Brazil
8. Lacmellea floribunda (Poepp.) Benth. & Hook.f. - Peru, NW Brazil, Suriname, French Guiana
9. Lacmellea foxii (Stapf) Markgr. - Peru
10. Lacmellea gracilis (Müll.Arg.) Markgr. - N Peru, NW Brazil
11. Lacmellea guyanensis (Müll.Arg.) Monach - French Guiana
12. Lacmellea klugii Monach. - Peru
13. Lacmellea macrantha J.F.Morales - Ecuador
14. Lacmellea microcarpa (Müll.Arg.) Markgr. - Colombia, S Venezuela, NW Brazil
15. Lacmellea oblongata Markgr. - SE Colombia, Ecuador, Peru
16. Lacmellea panamensis (Woodson) Markgr. - Costa Rica, Panama, Colombia, Ecuador
17. Lacmellea pauciflora (Kuhlm.) Markgr. - Brazil
18. Lacmellea peruviana (Van Heurck & Müll.Arg.) Markgr. - Peru
19. Lacmellea pygmaea Monach. - Amazonas State in Venezuela
20. Lacmellea ramosissima (Müll.Arg.) Markgr. - Colombia, S Venezuela, NW Brazil
21. Lacmellea speciosa Woodson - Costa Rica, Panama, Colombia, Ecuador, Peru
22. Lacmellea standleyi (Woodson) Monach. - Belize, Guatemala, Honduras
23. Lacmellea utilis (Arn.) Markgr. - S Venezuela, Guyana
24. Lacmellea zamorae J.F.Morales - Costa Rica
