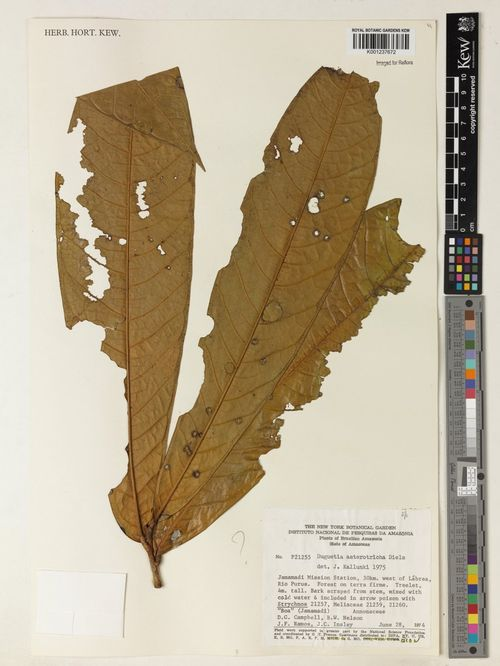

Conservation status
- Least Concern (IUCN 3.1)

Scientific classification
- Kingdom: Plantae
- Clade: Embryophytes
- Clade: Tracheophytes
- Clade: Spermatophytes
- Clade: Angiosperms
- Clade: Magnoliids
- Order: Magnoliales
- Family: Annonaceae
- Genus: Duguetia
- Species: D. asterotricha

Binomial name
- Duguetia asterotricha (Diels) R.E.Fr.

Synonyms
- Aberemoa asterotricha Diels

= Duguetia asterotricha =

Species of flowering plant

Duguetia asterotricha is a species of flowering shrub native to northern Brazil and northern Peru. It primarily grows in wet tropical biomes. The shrub grows to be 1.5 to 12 m (4 ft 11 in to 39 ft 4 in) tall and 3 to 5 cm (1.2 to 2.0 in) in diameter.
