= Duguetia vallicola =

Conservation status
- Least Concern (IUCN 3.1)

Scientific classification
- Kingdom: Plantae
- Clade: Embryophytes
- Clade: Tracheophytes
- Clade: Spermatophytes
- Clade: Angiosperms
- Clade: Magnoliids
- Order: Magnoliales
- Family: Annonaceae
- Genus: Duguetia
- Species: D. vallicola

Binomial name
- Duguetia vallicola J.F.Macbr.

Species of flowering plant

Duguetia vallicola is a large tree in the family Annonaceae. It is native to northern Colombia, Panama, and Venezuela. Its sepals have prominent venation. Its fruit is aromatic, and the pulp around the seeds can be eaten. The tree can grow to be 7 to 25 m (23 to 82 ft) tall and 10 to 30 cm (4 to 12 in) in trunk diameter.
