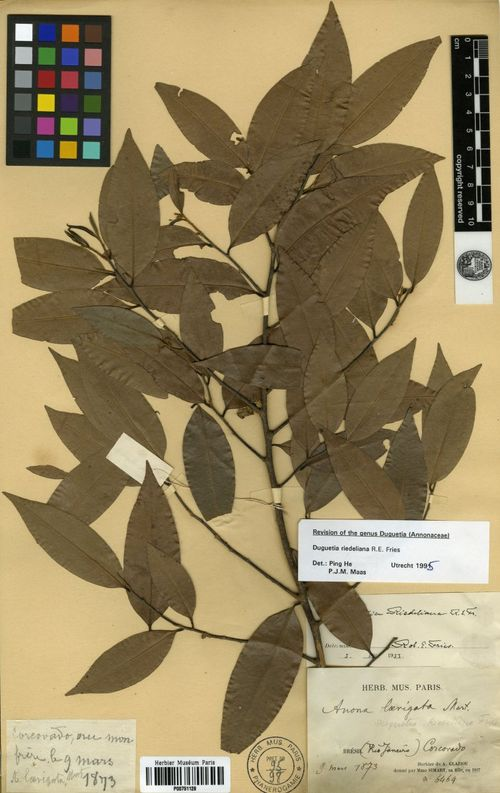

Conservation status
- Least Concern (IUCN 3.1)

Scientific classification
- Kingdom: Plantae
- Clade: Embryophytes
- Clade: Tracheophytes
- Clade: Spermatophytes
- Clade: Angiosperms
- Clade: Magnoliids
- Order: Magnoliales
- Family: Annonaceae
- Genus: Duguetia
- Species: D. riedeliana

Binomial name
- Duguetia riedeliana R.E.Fr.

= Duguetia riedeliana =

Species of flowering plant

Duguetia riedeliana is a species of flowering shrub or small tree in the custard apple family, Annonaceae. It is native to eastern Brazil. It can grow to be 4 to 6 meters tall.
