= Annona hypoglauca =

Conservation status
- Least Concern (IUCN 3.1)

Scientific classification
- Kingdom: Plantae
- Clade: Tracheophytes
- Clade: Angiosperms
- Clade: Magnoliids
- Order: Magnoliales
- Family: Annonaceae
- Genus: Annona
- Species: A. hypoglauca

Binomial name
- Annona hypoglauca Mart.

Synonyms
- Annona tessmannii Diels

Species of tree

Annona hypoglauca, also known as wild cherimoya, (not to be confused with Annona hayesii, also known as wild cherimoya) occurs along Amazon floodplains between Colombia and Bolivia. A. hypoglauca is a member of the family Annonaceae along with other fruiting plants like pawpaws, soursops, and cherimoyas. A. hypoglauca is currently cultivated scarcely outside of its native range and is classified as rare.

Studies on germination rates of A. hypoglauca yield poor results, with a meager 5% and seeds took upwards of 49 days to germinate. Seeds are small and lightweight compared to other Annona species. The native ecology of A. hypoglauca is rich whitewater floodplains of Amazonian lowland rain forests. And fish are likely candidates for seed dispersal, as the trees grow in seasonal floodplains and seed coats are excessively hard and pass directly through the digestive systems. Like other Annona spp. the inner membranes of seeds of A. hypoglauca are toxic.

Trees are relatively small, capping around 4-6m (15-18ft). They have a creamy flesh with a pudding-like consistency and a taste reminiscent of slightly savory taro. Pulp is minimal and ferments readily, so viability in commercial markets is slim. Regardless, though A. hypoglauca may not find its way into stores, it has better prospects in the medical industry.
