= Duguetia confinis =

Conservation status
- Least Concern (IUCN 3.1)

Scientific classification
- Kingdom: Plantae
- Clade: Tracheophytes
- Clade: Angiosperms
- Clade: Magnoliids
- Order: Magnoliales
- Family: Annonaceae
- Genus: Duguetia
- Species: D. confinis

Binomial name
- Duguetia confinis (Engl. & Diels) Chatrou

Synonyms
- Pachypodanthium confine Engl. & Diels; Pachypodanthium confine var. sargosii (R.E.Fr.) Le Thomas; Pachypodanthium sargosii R.E.Fr. ex Pellegr.; Pachypodanthium sargosii R.E.Fr.; Unona confinis Pierre ex Engl. & Diels

Species of tree

Duguetia confinis is a tree in the family Annonaceae. It is native to southern Cameroon, Gabon, Republic of the Congo, and Cabinda Province of Angola in west-central Africa. It grows in primary and secondary lowland rain forests on non-inundated soils up to 500 metres elevation.

The species was first describes as Pachypodanthium confine by Adolf Engler and Ludwig Diels in 1900. In 1998 Lars Willem Chatrou placed the species in genus Duguetia as D. confinis.
