= Duguetia cadaverica =

Conservation status
- Least Concern (IUCN 3.1)

Scientific classification
- Kingdom: Plantae
- Clade: Tracheophytes
- Clade: Angiosperms
- Clade: Magnoliids
- Order: Magnoliales
- Family: Annonaceae
- Genus: Duguetia
- Species: D. cadaverica

Binomial name
- Duguetia cadaverica Huber

Synonyms
- Geanthemum cadavericum (Huber) Saff.; Duguetia adiscandra Jans.-Jac.; Duguetia friesii Jans.-Jac.

Species of tree

Duguetia cadaverica is a tree in the family Annonaceae. Its native range is the Guianas and northern Brazil.
