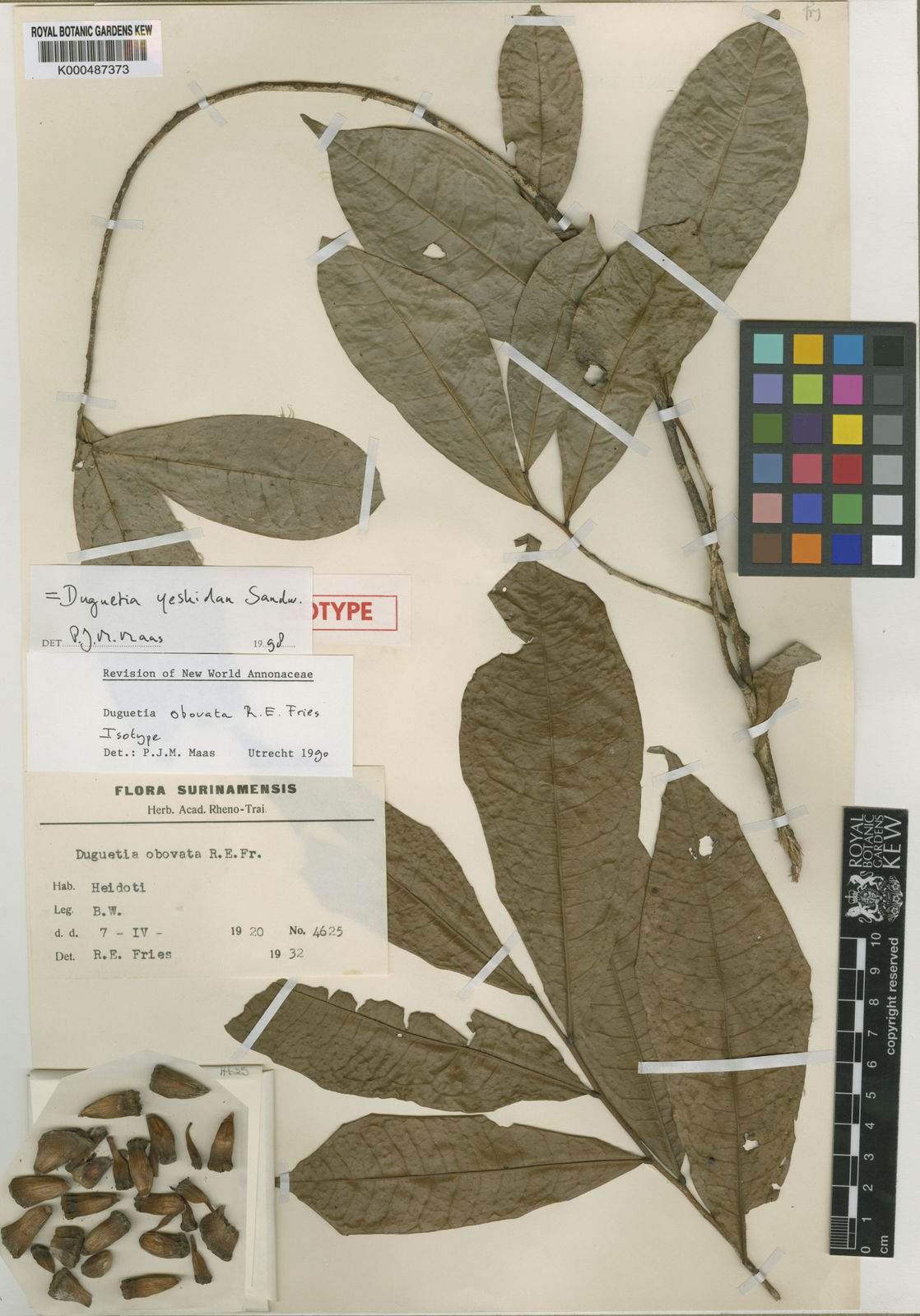

Conservation status
- Least Concern (IUCN 3.1)

Scientific classification
- Kingdom: Plantae
- Clade: Embryophytes
- Clade: Tracheophytes
- Clade: Spermatophytes
- Clade: Angiosperms
- Clade: Magnoliids
- Order: Magnoliales
- Family: Annonaceae
- Genus: Duguetia
- Species: D. yeshidan

Binomial name
- Duguetia yeshidan Sandwith

= Duguetia yeshidan =

Species of flowering plant

Duguetia yeshidan is a species of small flowering tree or shrub. It is native to Northern Brazil, French Guiana, Guyana, Suriname, and Venezuela. It grows to be 1 to 6 m (3.3 to 19.7 ft) tall and 2 to 8 cm (0.8 to 3.1 in) in diameter.
