= Duguetia staudtii =

Conservation status
- Least Concern (IUCN 3.1)

Scientific classification
- Kingdom: Plantae
- Clade: Embryophytes
- Clade: Tracheophytes
- Clade: Spermatophytes
- Clade: Angiosperms
- Clade: Magnoliids
- Order: Magnoliales
- Family: Annonaceae
- Genus: Duguetia
- Species: D. staudtii

Binomial name
- Duguetia staudtii (Engl. & Diels) Chatrou

Synonyms
- Pachypodanthium staudtii (Engl. & Diels) Engl. & Diels; Uvaria staudtii Engl. & Diels

Species of plant

Duguetia staudtii is a medium-sized evergreen tree within the Annonaceae family. It is one of the four species within the genus Duguetia that is native to Africa.

== Description ==
The tree grows to be up to 36 meters tall. Straight, cylindrical trunk that can be branchless for up to 20 meters, stem bark is rarely scaly, commonly thick and soft and yellow or grey-green in colour. Leaf: simple, alternate arrangement, petiole, 0.2 - 0.5 cm. Leaf-blade, narrowly elliptical to obovate in outline, 10 x 24 cm long and 2 x 5 cm wide; dark green upper surface is coriaceous and glabrous while lower surface is duller.

== Distribution ==
It grows in tropical west and west-central Africa, from Guinea to the Central African Republic and southwards to Gabon and the Democratic Republic of Congo. It is locally called Ntom in Central African Republic.

== Chemistry ==
Stem bark contains the bioactive compounds, 2,4,5 trimethoxystyrene and 1-(2,4,5- trimethoxyphenyl)-ethanone. It contains members of the group of alkaloids: berberines, tetrahydroprotoberberines and aporphines.

== Uses ==
Bark extracts used by traditional healers as treatment for bronchitis, toothache, edema and head lice. Wood used as timber in local carpentry work, especially as planks or for poles in house construction.
