= Duguetia aripuanae =

Conservation status
- Data Deficient (IUCN 3.1)

Scientific classification
- Kingdom: Plantae
- Clade: Tracheophytes
- Clade: Angiosperms
- Clade: Magnoliids
- Order: Magnoliales
- Family: Annonaceae
- Genus: Duguetia
- Species: D. aripuanae

Binomial name
- Duguetia aripuanae Maas

Species of flowering plant

Duguetia aripuanae is a species of plant in the Annonaceae family. It is a shrub or tree endemic to Mato Grosso state in west-central Brazil. It grows in lowland terre firme Amazon Rainforest.
