= Lacmellea panamensis =

Scientific classification
- Kingdom: Plantae
- Clade: Tracheophytes
- Clade: Angiosperms
- Clade: Eudicots
- Clade: Asterids
- Order: Gentianales
- Family: Apocynaceae
- Genus: Lacmellea
- Species: L. panamensis

Binomial name
- Lacmellea panamensis (Woodson) Markgf.

Species of tree

Lacmellea panamensis is a species of tree in the family Apocynaceae native to Costa Rica, Panama, Nicaragua, Colombia, and Ecuador. It is a medium-sized tree, with a straight trunk, that is scattered with conical spines that are rather blunt, a distinctive feature of the species. Its leaves are around 10 centimetres (3.9 in) long, spaced evenly along branches, simple in shape, dark green and if damaged produce a white latex. Their flowers are white and around 3 centimetres (1.2 in) long thin tubes and develop into yellow berries of 3 cm in diameter.

Its seeds weigh around 0.25 grams (0.0088 oz) and when they germinate the cotyledons remains underground, acting as an energy store. In an artificial experiment, 80% of seedlings were able to survive having their leaves removed, or being placed in deep shade (0.08% of full sunlight), making them relatively shade tolerant.
