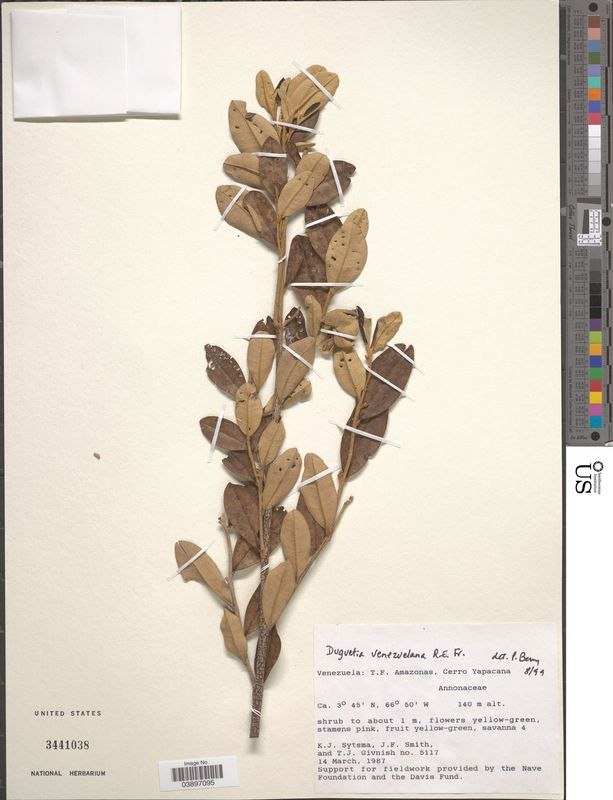

Conservation status
- Endangered (IUCN 3.1)

Scientific classification
- Kingdom: Plantae
- Clade: Embryophytes
- Clade: Tracheophytes
- Clade: Spermatophytes
- Clade: Angiosperms
- Clade: Magnoliids
- Order: Magnoliales
- Family: Annonaceae
- Genus: Duguetia
- Species: D. venezuelana

Binomial name
- Duguetia venezuelana R.E.Fr.

= Duguetia venezuelana =

Species of flowering plant

Duguetia venezuelana is a species of flowering shrub in the family Annonaceae. It is native to Venezuela and may be present in Northern Brazil. It grows to 0.3 to 4 m (1 ft 0 in to 13 ft 1 in) tall.
