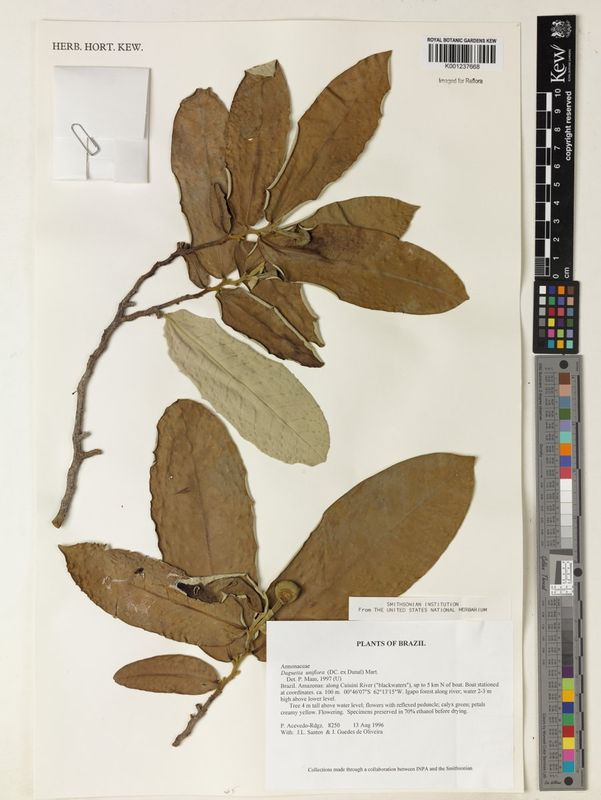

Conservation status
- Least Concern (IUCN 3.1)

Scientific classification
- Kingdom: Plantae
- Clade: Embryophytes
- Clade: Tracheophytes
- Clade: Spermatophytes
- Clade: Angiosperms
- Clade: Magnoliids
- Order: Magnoliales
- Family: Annonaceae
- Genus: Duguetia
- Species: D. uniflora

Binomial name
- Duguetia uniflora (DC.) Mart.

= Duguetia uniflora =

Species of flowering plant

Duguetia uniflora is a species of flowering tree in the family Annonaceae. It is native to Northern Brazil, Colombia, and Venezuela. It grows to 3 to 22 m (10 to 72 ft) in height and 5 to 25 cm (2 to 10 in) in trunk diameter. It flowers from April to November and it grows in elevations up to 150 m (490 ft).
