= Hiltje Maas-van de Kamer =

Dutch botanist

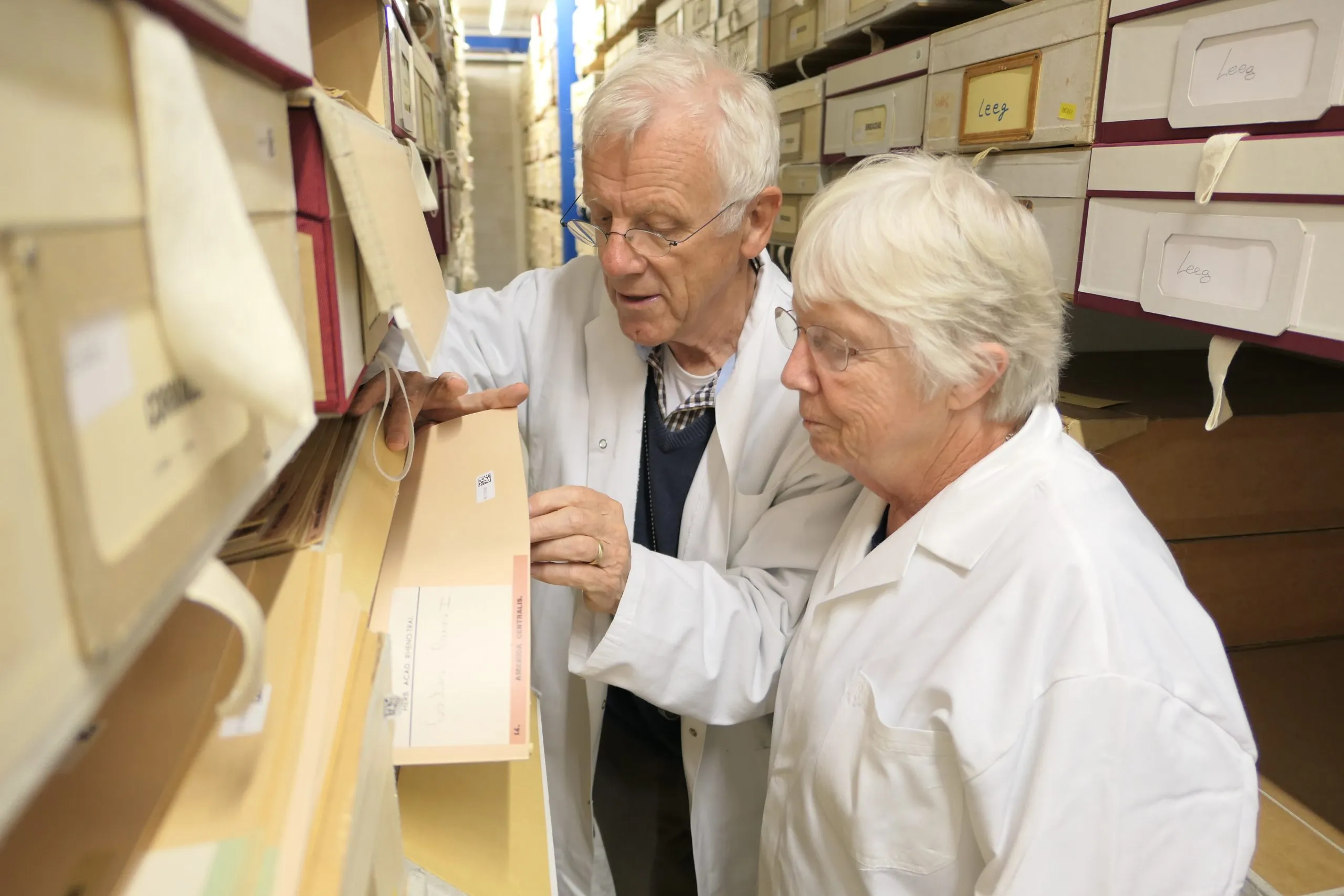
Paul and Hiltje Maas-van de Kamer in 2017, photo Dave Skinner

Hillegonda (Hiltje) Maas-van de Kamer (born 9 December 1941) is a botanist at the Institute of Systematic Botany at Utrecht University. She is the wife of Professor Paul Maas and together they have published many papers. She is a specialist in the flora of the neotropics.

She is the daughter of Catharina Braak and Jan Hendrik van de Kamer, who was a pharmacist and chemist at the TNO. She studied between 1962 and 1981 at Utrecht University. Together, the Maas partnership have identified and named about two hundred fifty plants from the Burmanniaceae, the Costus Family (Costaceae), the Gentian Family (Gentianaceae), the Bloodwort Family (Haemodoraceae), the Banana Family (Musaceae), the Olacaceae, the Triuridaceae, and the Ginger Family (Zingiberaceae).

The Annonaceae and saprotrophic plants from the neotropics, such as the Burmanniaceae, are two major areas of research.

Maas has also worked with the genus Canna (Cannaceae) and has published floristic treatments of this group for Ecuador (Maas & Maas 1988), and in 2008 released a complete revision of the genus, The Cannaceae of the World.
