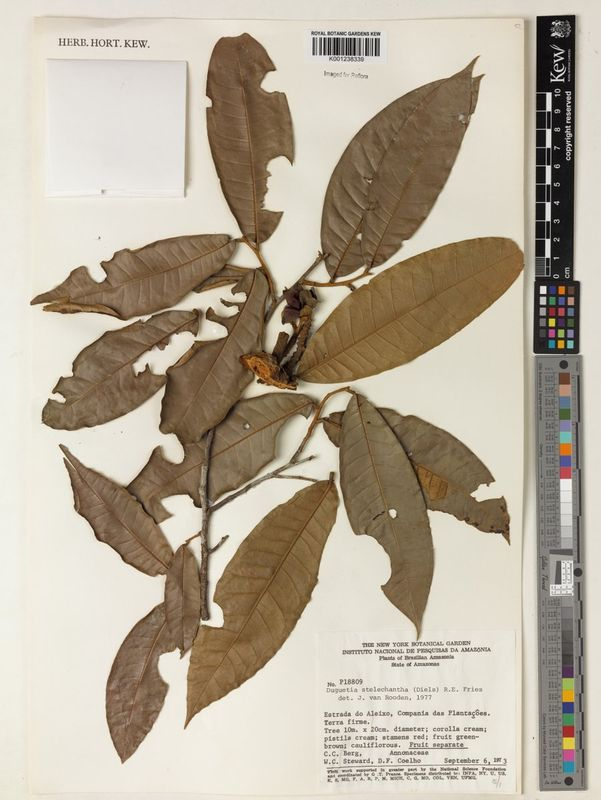

Conservation status
- Least Concern (IUCN 3.1)

Scientific classification
- Kingdom: Plantae
- Clade: Embryophytes
- Clade: Tracheophytes
- Clade: Angiosperms
- Clade: Magnoliids
- Order: Magnoliales
- Family: Annonaceae
- Genus: Duguetia
- Species: D. stelechantha

Binomial name
- Duguetia stelechantha (Diels) R.E.Fr.

= Duguetia stelechantha =

Species of flowering plant

Duguetia stelechantha is a species of flowering tree in the family Annonaceae. It is native to Bolivia (Pando), Brazil (Pará, Amazonas, Rondônia), and Guyana. It grows to be 5 to 20 m (16 to 66 ft) tall, but can be found as short as 3 meters in height. Its trunk diameter is from 5 to 40 cm (2.0 to 15.7 in).
