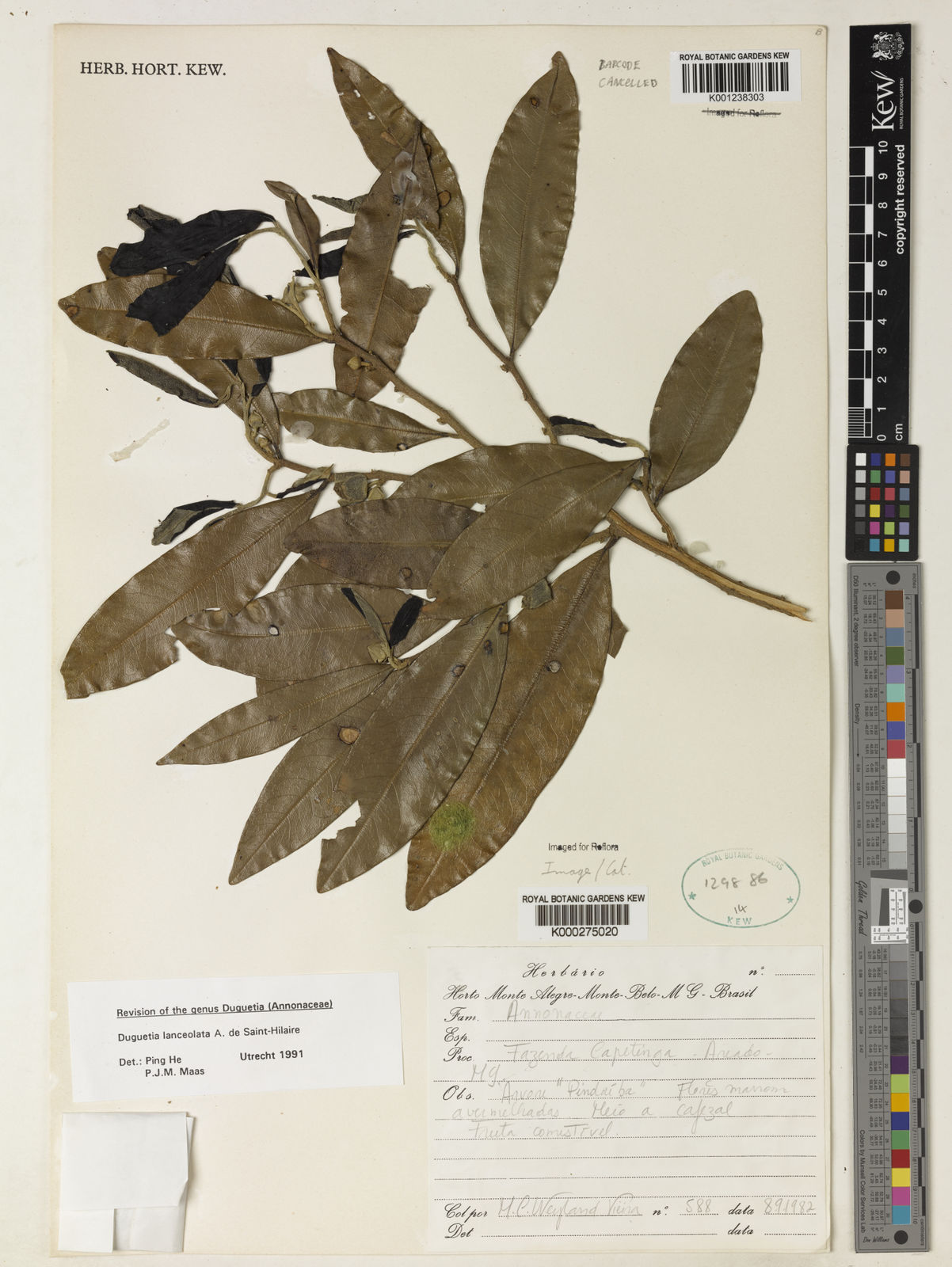

Conservation status
- Least Concern (IUCN 3.1)

Scientific classification
- Kingdom: Plantae
- Clade: Tracheophytes
- Clade: Angiosperms
- Clade: Magnoliids
- Order: Magnoliales
- Family: Annonaceae
- Genus: Duguetia
- Species: D. lanceolata

Binomial name
- Duguetia lanceolata A.St.-Hil.

Synonyms
- Aberemoa lanceolata (A.St.-Hil.) Warm.; Aberemoa lanceolata var. parvifolia R.E.Fr.; Duguetia lanceolata var. parvifolia (R.E.Fr.) R.E.Fr.

= Duguetia lanceolata =

Species of flowering plant

Duguetia lanceolata is a species of flowering tree that is native to eastern and southern Brazil. It grows in the Cerrado or in tropical forests. It grows from elevations of 0 to 850 m. It fruits from October to January. Duguetia lanceolata was the first species to be described in the genus Duguetia, in 1825.

== Description ==
Duguetia lanceolata is a tree (rarely a shrub) that grows 8-20 m tall, with its trunk diameter normally falling between 25-60 cm in width. The leaves are elliptical and are 6-10 cm long. Its young twigs are covered with fine stellate scales.

Its fruit is edible and has 60 to 80 carpels. Its seeds are obvoid and 18-22 mm long. The infloresences are red and found among the leaves.

The wood of Duguetia lanceolata is occasionally used for construction, although it has a low resistance to rot.
