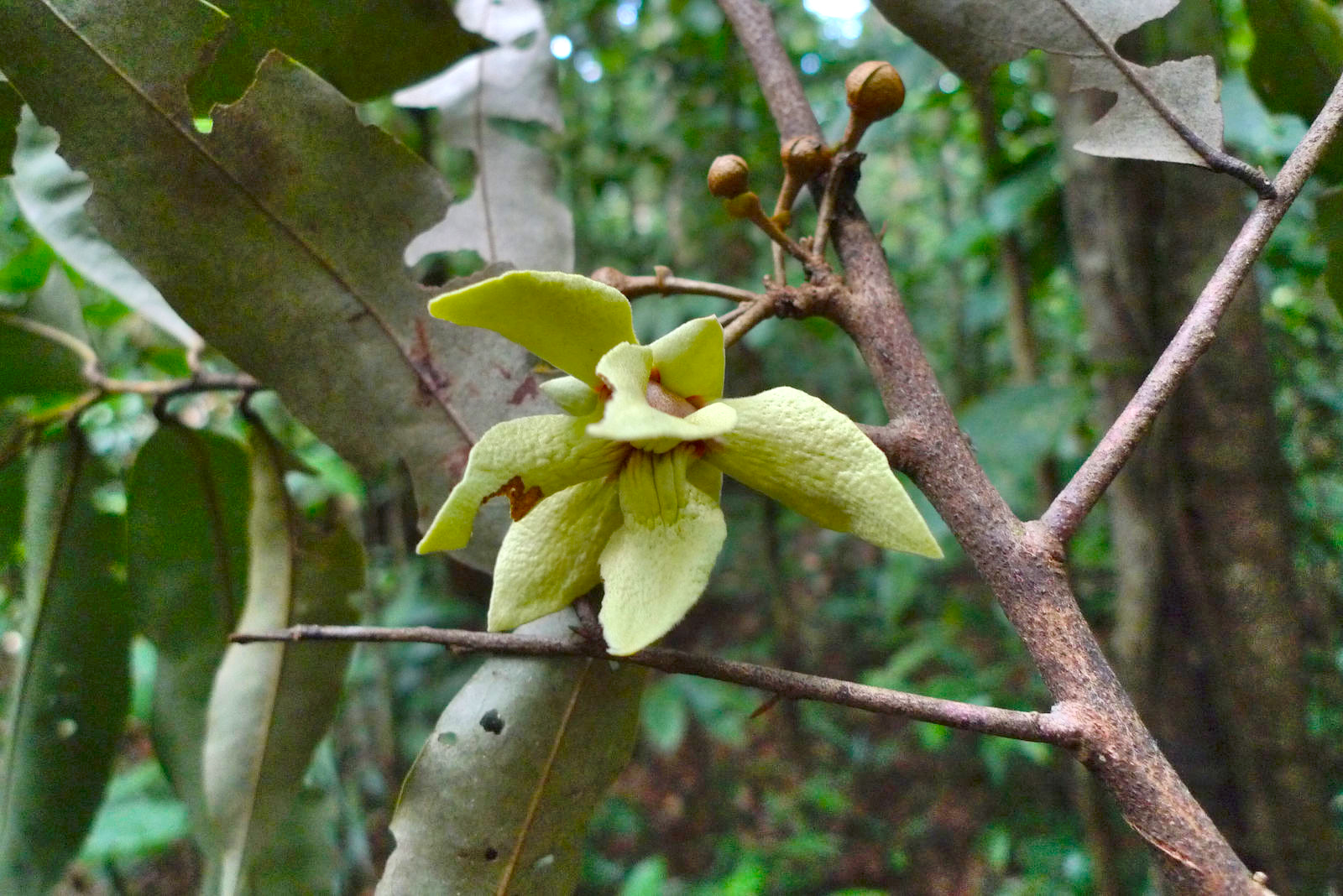
- Flower

Conservation status
- Least Concern (IUCN 3.1)

Scientific classification
- Kingdom: Plantae
- Clade: Embryophytes
- Clade: Tracheophytes
- Clade: Spermatophytes
- Clade: Angiosperms
- Clade: Magnoliids
- Order: Magnoliales
- Family: Annonaceae
- Genus: Duguetia
- Species: D. lepidota

Binomial name
- Duguetia lepidota (Miq.) Pulle

Synonyms
- Aberemoa lepidota (Miq.) R.E.Fr.; Annona lepidota Miq.

= Duguetia lepidota =

Species of flowering plant

Duguetia lepidota is a tree in the custard apple family Annonaceae, native to northern South America.

== Description ==
Duguetia lepidota is a tree (rarely a shrub) up to 25 m (82 ft) tall and a diameter up to 70 cm (28 in). The leaves are narrow and pointed, broadest at the base, and measure up to 20 cm (7.9 in) long and 5 cm (2.0 in) wide.

The inflorescences are composed of up to nine flowers, each with six petals arranged in two whorls of three. The petals are green-yellow with a red base.

The ovoid fruit is composed of numerous fused carpels which may be beaked.

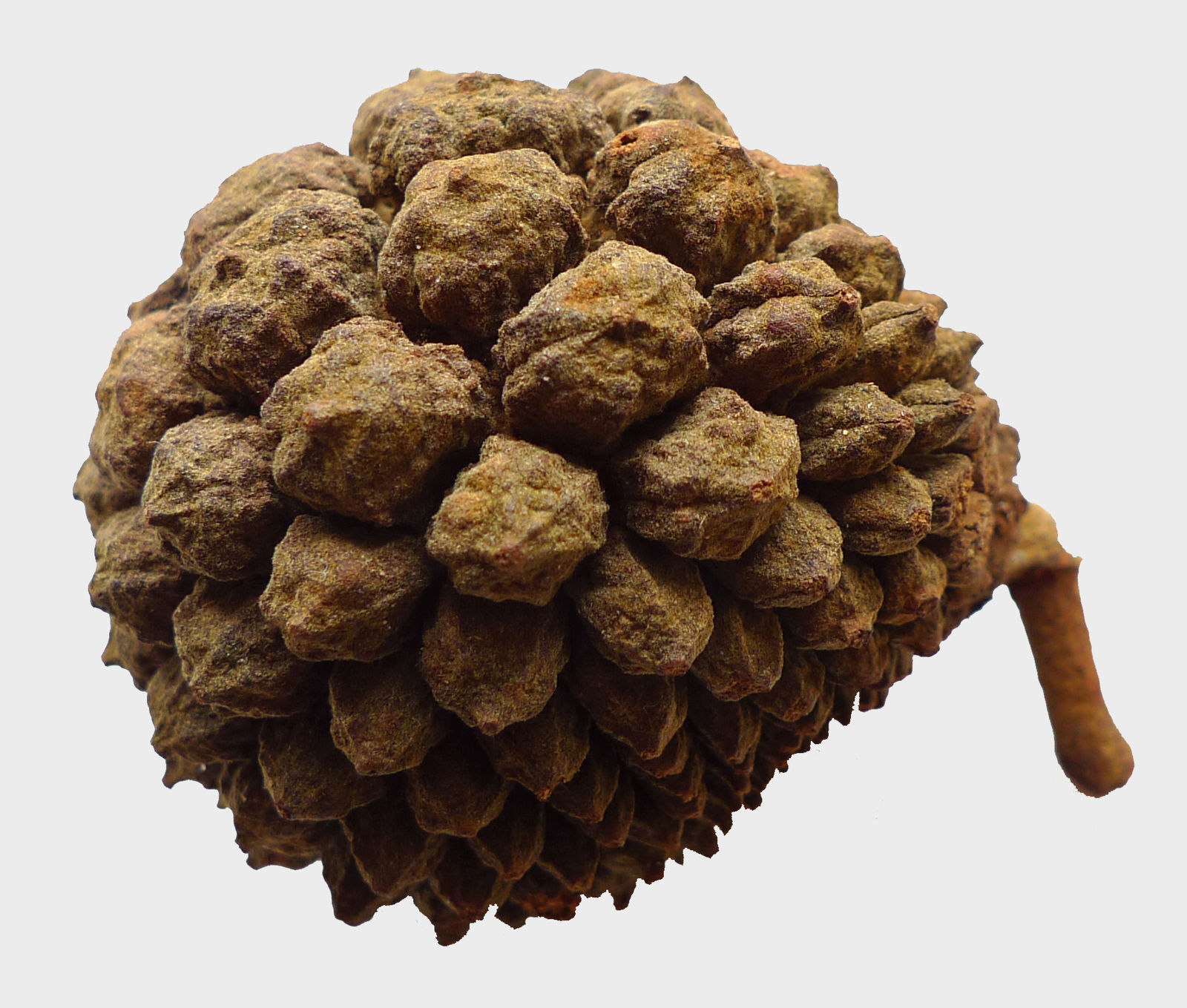
Fruit

== Distribution and habitat ==
It is native to Colombia, Venezuela, Suriname and northern Brazil, and occurs in lowland gallery forest.

== Uses ==
The fruit is edible, and the trees are harvested for the wood.
