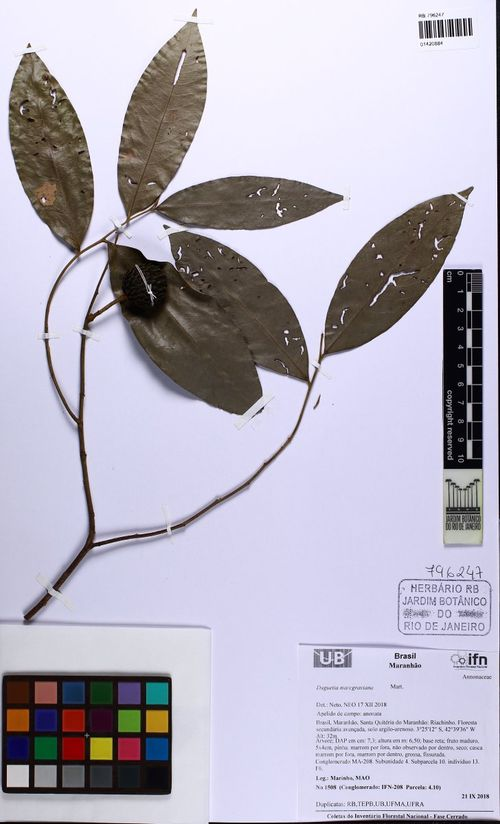

Conservation status
- Least Concern (IUCN 3.1)

Scientific classification
- Kingdom: Plantae
- Clade: Embryophytes
- Clade: Tracheophytes
- Clade: Spermatophytes
- Clade: Angiosperms
- Clade: Magnoliids
- Order: Magnoliales
- Family: Annonaceae
- Genus: Duguetia
- Species: D. marcgraviana

Binomial name
- Duguetia marcgraviana Mart.

= Duguetia marcgraviana =

Species of flowering plant

Duguetia marcgraviana is a species of tree native to northern, northeastern, and west-central Brazil and Bolivia. In some cases, it grows to be a shrub.
