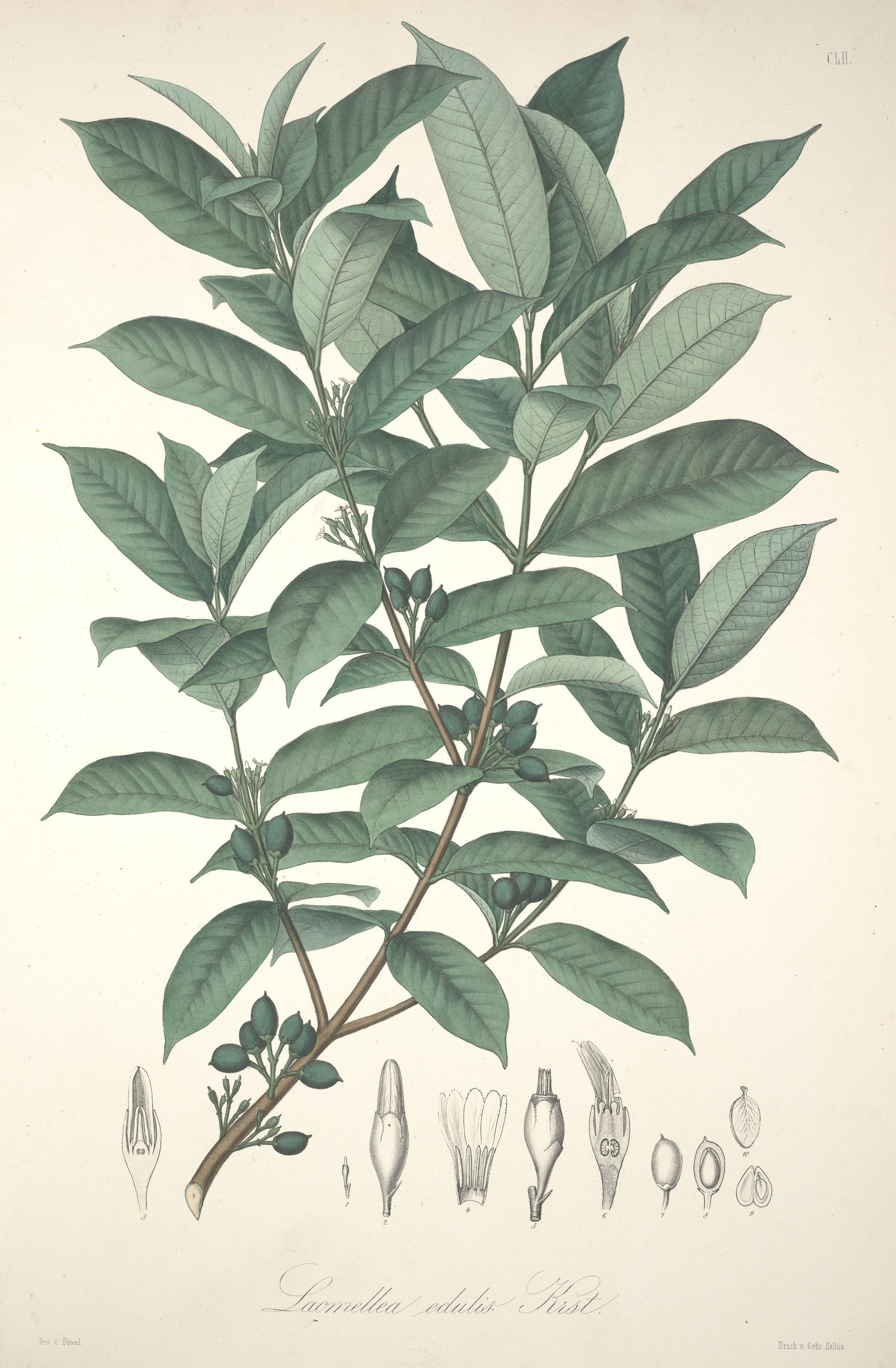

Conservation status
- Least Concern (IUCN 3.1)

Scientific classification
- Kingdom: Plantae
- Clade: Tracheophytes
- Clade: Angiosperms
- Clade: Eudicots
- Clade: Asterids
- Order: Gentianales
- Family: Apocynaceae
- Genus: Lacmellea
- Species: L. edulis

Binomial name
- Lacmellea edulis H.Karst.

Synonyms
- Lacmellea armata (Pittier) Monach.; Lacmellea lactescens (Kuhlm.) Markgr.; Zschokkea armata Pittier; Zschokkea lactescens Kuhlm.

= Lacmellea edulis =

Species of plant

Lacmellea edulis, common name: chicle muyu, is a species of tree in the family Apocynaceae. It is native to Panama, Colombia, Venezuela, Brazil, Peru and Ecuador.
