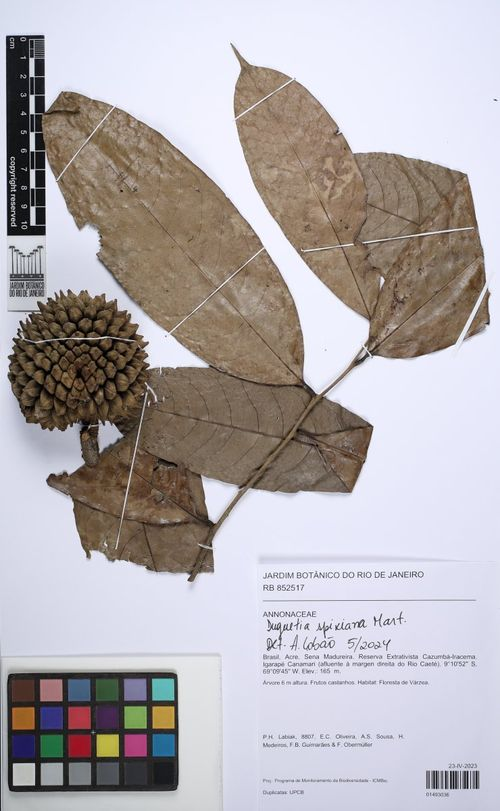

Conservation status
- Least Concern (IUCN 3.1)

Scientific classification
- Kingdom: Plantae
- Clade: Embryophytes
- Clade: Tracheophytes
- Clade: Spermatophytes
- Clade: Angiosperms
- Clade: Magnoliids
- Order: Magnoliales
- Family: Annonaceae
- Genus: Duguetia
- Species: D. spixiana

Binomial name
- Duguetia spixiana Mart.

= Duguetia spixiana =

Species of flowering plant

Duguetia spixiana is a species of flowering tree that is native to Bolivia, Northern Brazil, Colombia, Ecuador, and Peru. It grows to 4 to 20 m (13 to 66 ft) tall and 10 to 25 cm (4 to 10 in) in diameter. Its fruit is brown or white it is shaped like a wide ellipsoid it has 80 to 220 carpels with an upper outlier boundary of 500.
