= Duguetia gardneriana =

Conservation status
- Least Concern (IUCN 3.1)

Scientific classification
- Kingdom: Plantae
- Clade: Tracheophytes
- Clade: Angiosperms
- Clade: Magnoliids
- Order: Magnoliales
- Family: Annonaceae
- Genus: Duguetia
- Species: D. gardneriana

Binomial name
- Duguetia gardneriana Mart.

Species of flowering plant

Duguetia gardneriana is a species of flowering plant in the family Annonaceae. It a shrub or tree native to northeastern Brazil.
