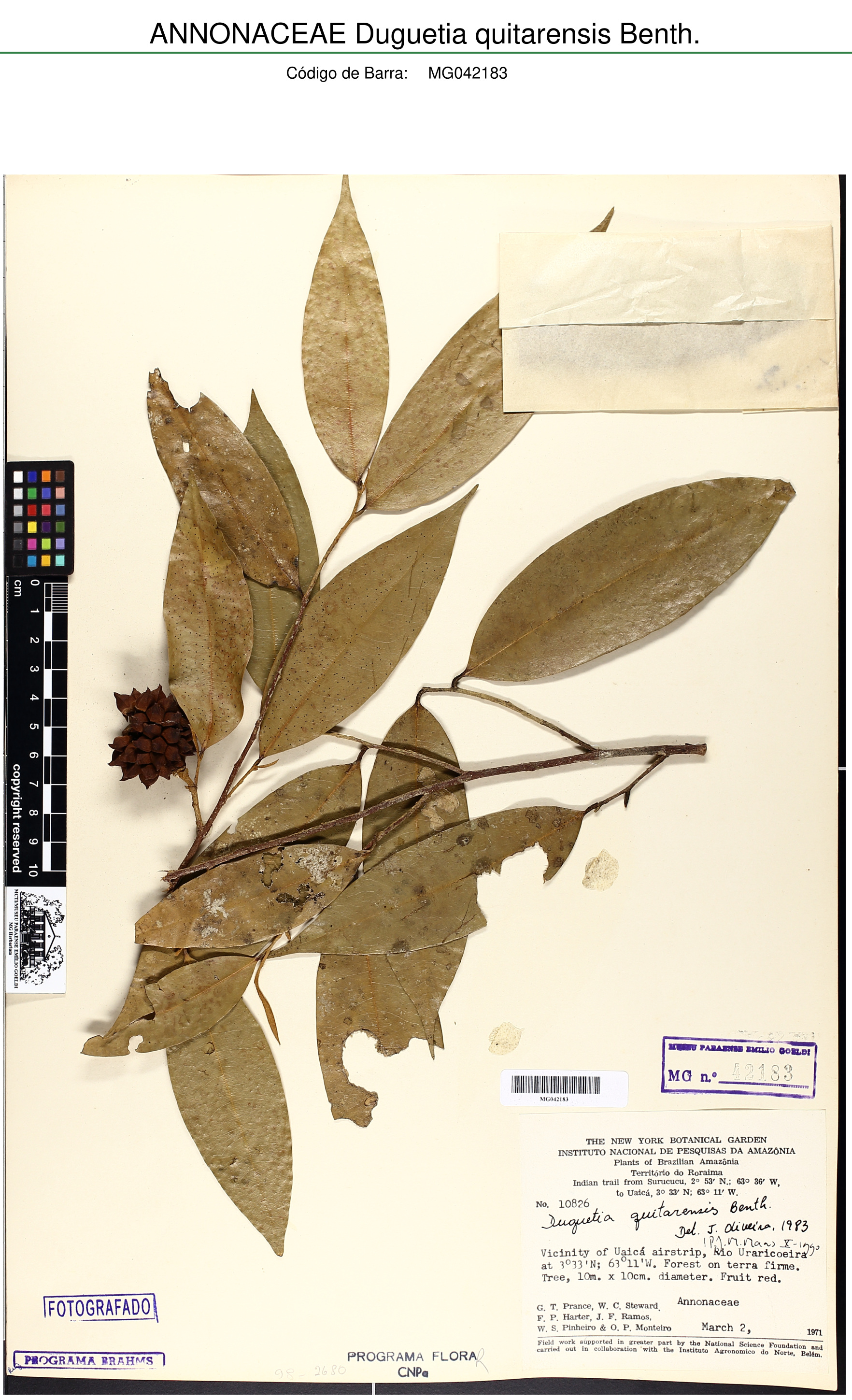
- Herbarium specimen

Conservation status
- Least Concern (IUCN 3.1)

Scientific classification
- Kingdom: Plantae
- Clade: Embryophytes
- Clade: Tracheophytes
- Clade: Spermatophytes
- Clade: Angiosperms
- Clade: Magnoliids
- Order: Magnoliales
- Family: Annonaceae
- Genus: Duguetia
- Species: D. quitarensis

Binomial name
- Duguetia quitarensis Benth.

Synonyms
- Aberemoa quitarensis (Benth.) R.E.Fr.; Duguetia ibonensis Rusby; Duguetia tessmannii R.E.Fr.

= Duguetia quitarensis =

Species of flowering plant

Duguetia quitarensis is a species of flowering plant in the custard apple family Annonaceae. It is a tree native to Bolivia, Brazil North, Brazil Northeast, Colombia, Ecuador, Guyana, Peru and Venezuela.
