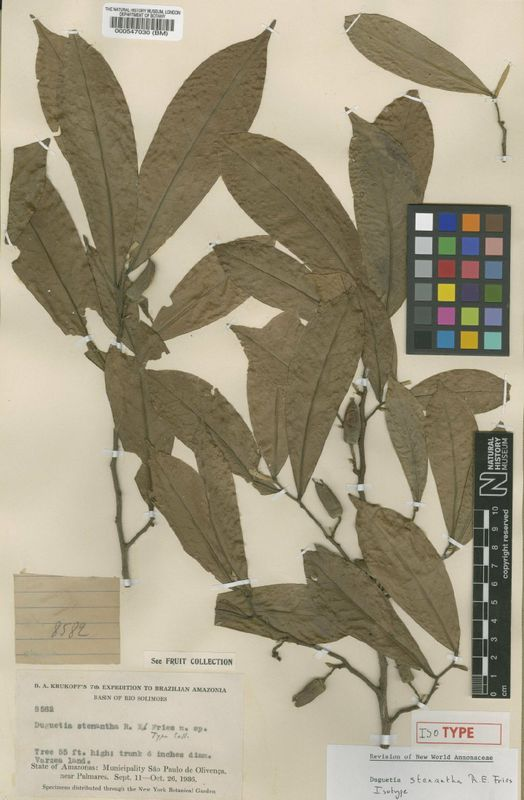

Conservation status
- Least Concern (IUCN 3.1)

Scientific classification
- Kingdom: Plantae
- Clade: Embryophytes
- Clade: Tracheophytes
- Clade: Angiosperms
- Clade: Magnoliids
- Order: Magnoliales
- Family: Annonaceae
- Genus: Duguetia
- Species: D. stenantha

Binomial name
- Duguetia stenantha R. E. Fr.

= Duguetia stenantha =

Species of flowering plat

Duguetia stenantha is a species of flowering tree in the family Annonaceae. It is native to Brazil (Amazonas), Colombia (Amazonas, Caquetá, Vaupés), and Peru. It grows to be 3 to 35 m (10 to 115 ft) tall and 10 to 30 cm (4 to 12 in) in diameter.
