= Annona hayesii =

Conservation status
- Least Concern (IUCN 3.1)

Scientific classification
- Kingdom: Plantae
- Clade: Tracheophytes
- Clade: Angiosperms
- Clade: Magnoliids
- Order: Magnoliales
- Family: Annonaceae
- Genus: Annona
- Species: A. hayesii

Binomial name
- Annona hayesii Saff.

Species of flowering plant

Annona hayesii is a species of flowering plant in the family Annonaceae. It is a large shrub or small tree native to Colombia and Panama, where grows in lowland rain forest. Fruits range in color from green to greenish-white, similar to other members of the Annonaceae family. Very little is known about this species. It is unknown in cultivation, but may have potential.

The species was first described by William Edwin Safford in 1925.
