= Paul Maas (botanist) =

Dutch botanist

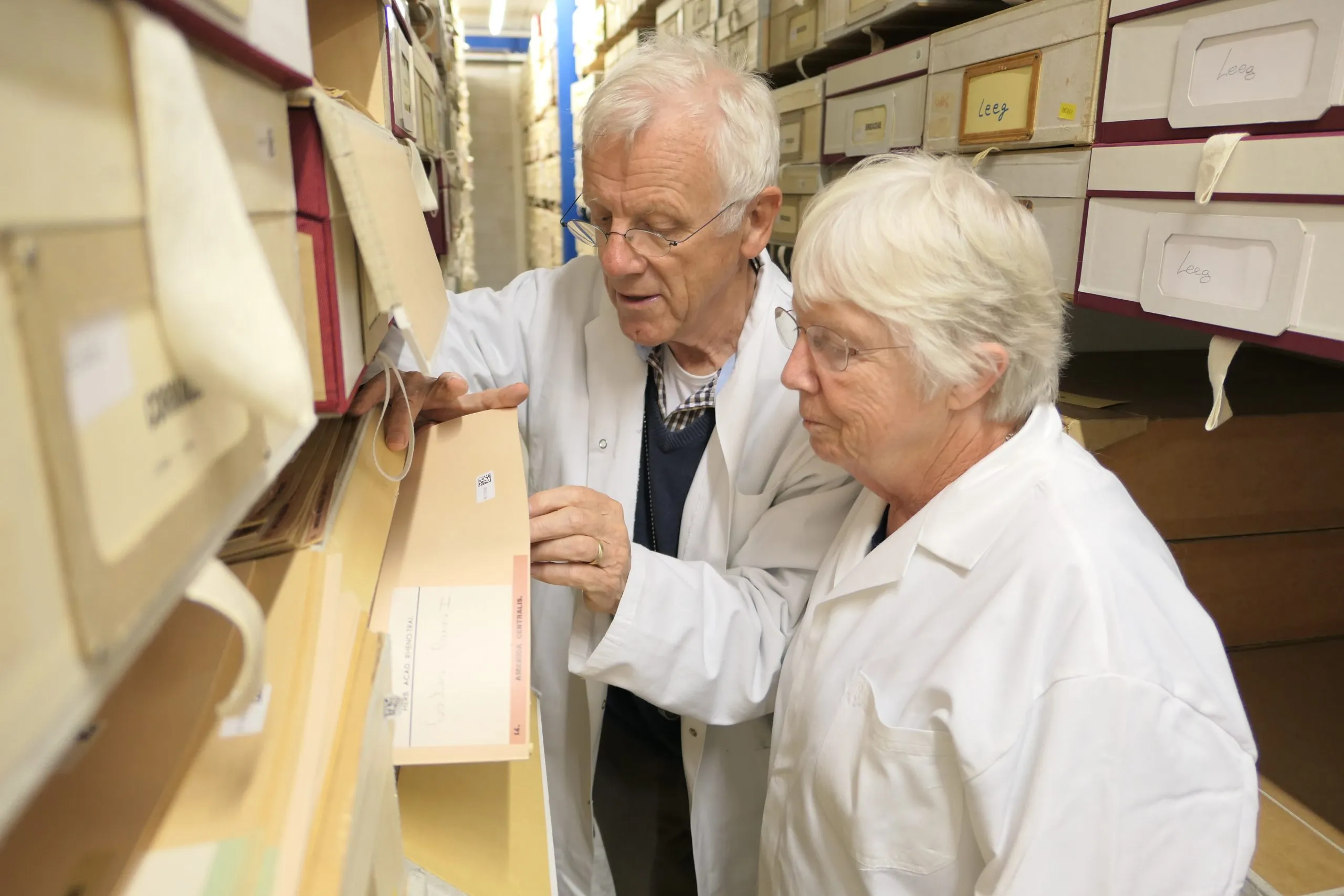
Paul and Hiltje Maas (2017)

Paulus Johannes Maria "Paul" Maas (born 27 February 1939, in Arnhem) is a botanist from the Netherlands and a specialist in the flora of the neotropics.

== Personal Life and Career ==
Maas has identified and named about two hundred fifty plants from the Burmanniaceae, the Costus Family (Costaceae), the Gentian Family (Gentianaceae), the Bloodwort Family (Haemodoraceae), the Banana Family (Musaceae), the Olacaceae, the Triuridaceae, and the Ginger Family (Zingiberaceae).

The Annonaceae and saprotrophic plants from the neotropics, such as the Burmanniaceae, are two major areas of research.

Maas has also worked with the genus Canna (Cannaceae), and has published floristic treatments of this group for the Guianas (Maas 1985) and Ecuador (Maas & Maas 1988).

In 2008, he was honoured when botanists Mols, Kessler & Rogstad published a genus of flowering plants from Indo-China, belonging to the family Annonaceae as Maasia.

Maas is married to fellow botanist Hiltje Maas-van de Kamer.

== Published works ==
- Maas, P. J. M. 1985. 195. Cannaceae. In: A. R. A. Görts-van Rijn, ed. 1985+. Flora of the Guianas. Series A: Phanerogams. 1212+ volsfasc. Königstein. VolFasc. 1, pp. xx—xx69–73 .
- Maas, P. J. M. and H. Maas. 1988. 223. Cannaceae. In: G. Harling et al., eds. 1973+. Flora of Ecuador. 5660+ volsnos. Göteborg. VolNo. 32, pp. 1–9.
- Segeren, W & Maas, PJM - The genus Canna in northern South America (1971), Acta Botanica Neerlandica. 20(6): 663–680.
