= List of Annona species =

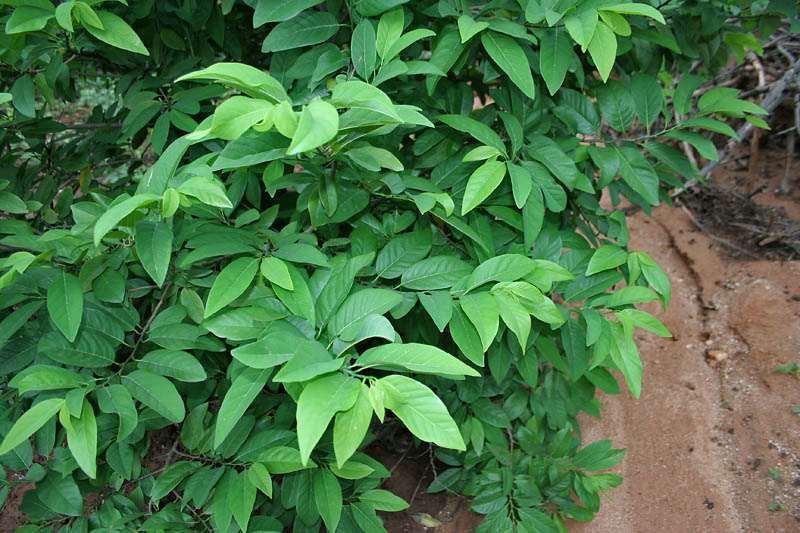
Annona squamosa in Hyderabad.

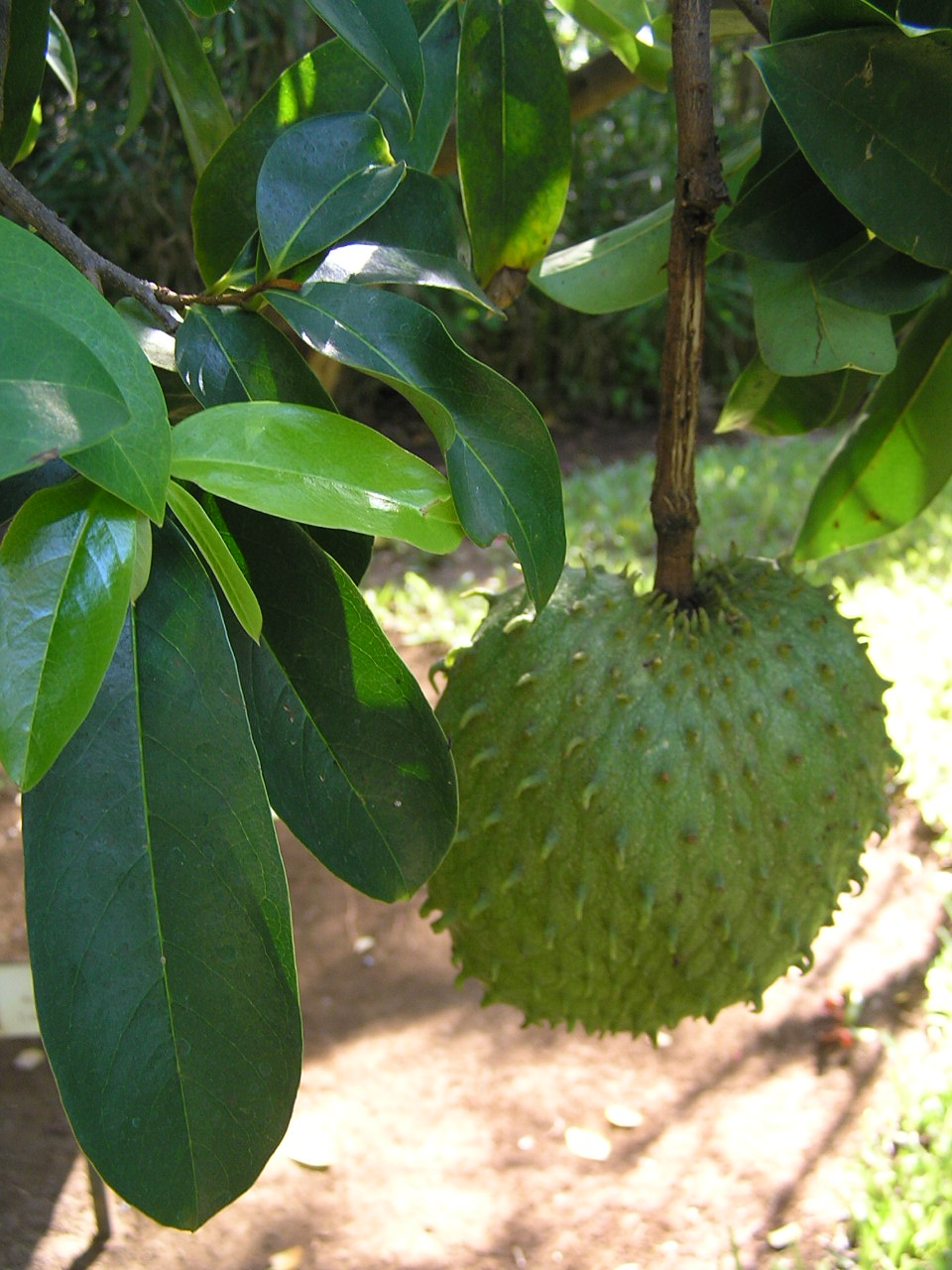
Annona muricata

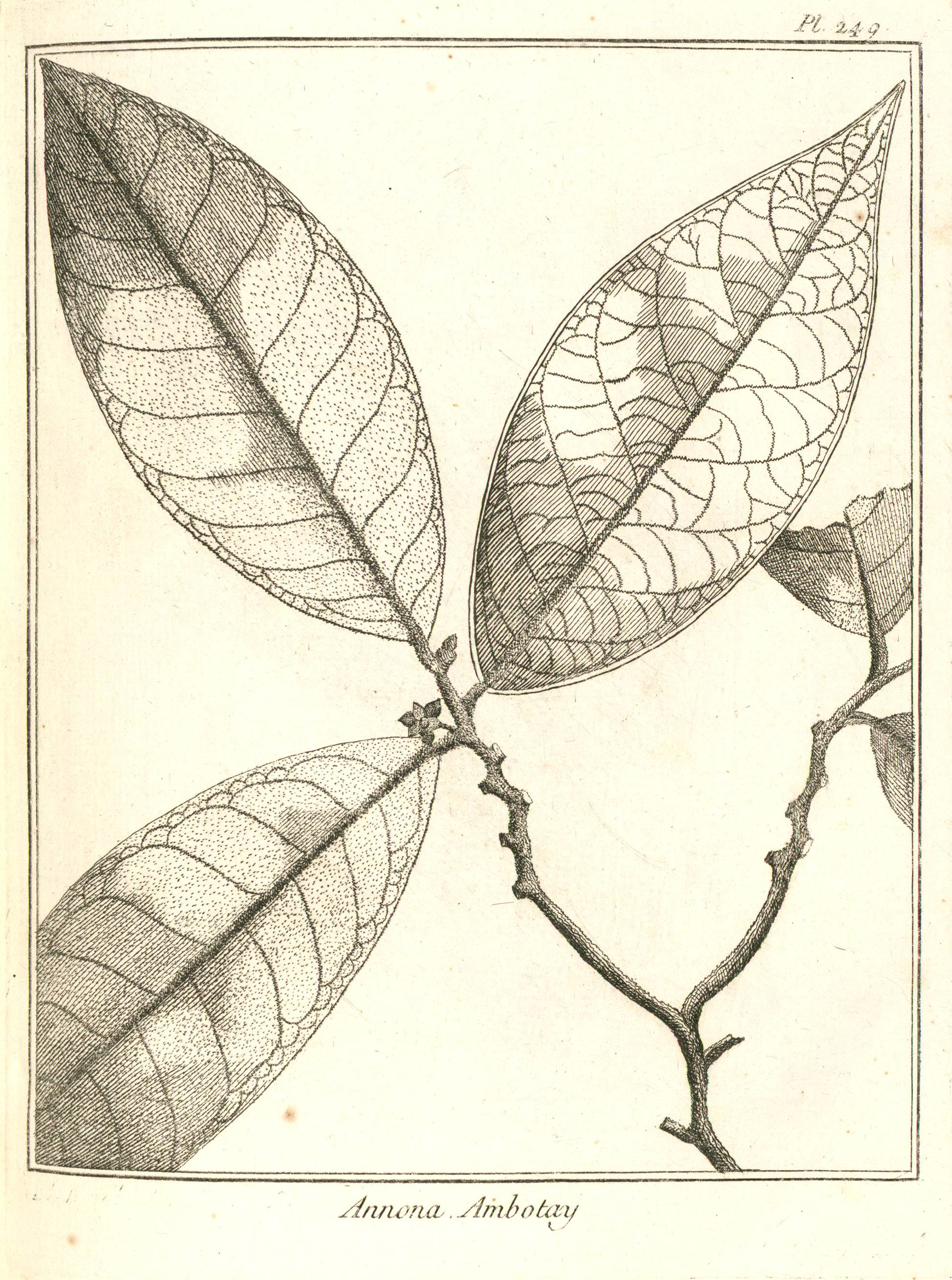
Annona ambotay Aublet

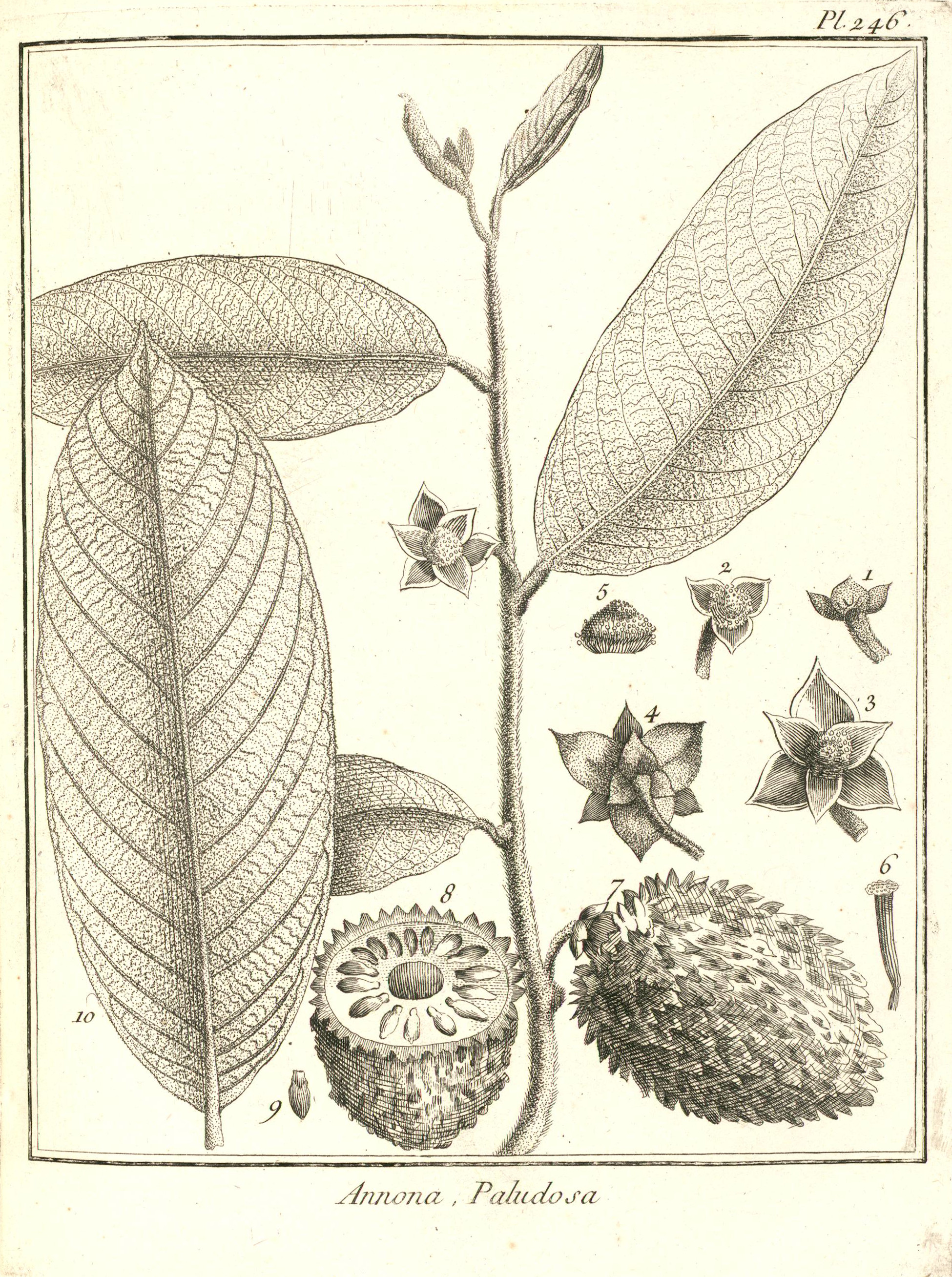
Annona paludosa Aublet

Annona is a genus of trees in the Annonaceae family. 171 species are accepted as of November 2025.

- Annona acuminata Saff.
- Annona acutiflora Mart.
- Annona acutifolia Saff. ex R.E.Fr.
- Annona amazonica R.E.Fr.
- Annona ambotay Aubl.
- Annona andicola (Maas & Westra) H.Rainer
- Annona angustifolia Huber
- Annona annonoides (R.E.Fr.) Maas & Westra
- Annona asplundiana R.E.Fr.
- Annona atabapensis Kunth
- Annona aurantiaca Barb.Rodr.
- Annona bahiensis (Maas & Westra) H.Rainer
- Annona bicolor Urb.
- Annona billbergii R.E.Fr.
- Annona boliviana (R.E.Fr.) H.Rainer
- Annona bullata A.Rich.
- Annona burchellii R.E.Fr.
- Annona cacans Warm.
- Annona caesia G.E.Schatz, C.A.Ramos & O.Ortiz
- Annona calcarata (R.E.Fr.) H.Rainer
- Annona calophylla R.E.Fr.
- Annona campestris R.E.Fr.
- Annona caput-medusae Westra & H.Rainer
- Annona cascarilloides Griseb.
- Annona centrantha (R.E.Fr.) H.Rainer
- Annona cercocarpa Saff.
- Annona cherimola Mill.
- Annona cherimolioides Triana & Planch.
- Annona conica Ruiz & Pav. ex G.Don
- Annona contrerasii J.Jiménez Ram. & J.C.Soto
- Annona cordifolia (Szyszył.) Poepp. ex Maas & Westra
- Annona coriacea Mart.
- Annona cornifolia A.St.-Hil.
- Annona crassiflora Mart.
- Annona crassivenia Saff.
- Annona cristalensis (Alain) Borhidi & Moncada
- Annona crotonifolia Mart.
- Annona cubensis R.E.Fr.
- Annona cuspidata (Mart.) H.Rainer
- Annona danforthii (Standl.) H.Rainer
- Annona deceptrix (Westra) H.Rainer
- Annona deminuta R.E.Fr.
- Annona densicoma Mart.
- Annona dioica A.St.-Hil.
- Annona dolabripetala Raddi
- Annona dolichopetala (R.E.Fr.) H.Rainer
- Annona dolichophylla R.E.Fr.
- Annona domingensis R.E.Fr.
- Annona duckei Diels
- Annona dumetorum R.E.Fr.
- Annona echinata Dunal
- Annona ecuadorensis R.E.Fr.
- Annona edulis (Triana & Planch.) H.Rainer
- Annona ekmanii R.E.Fr.
- Annona emarginata (Schltdl.) H.Rainer
- Annona excellens R.E.Fr.
- Annona exsucca DC.
- Annona fendleri (R.E.Fr.) H.Rainer
- Annona ferruginea (R.E.Fr.) H.Rainer
- Annona foetida Mart.
- Annona fosteri (Maas & Westra) H.Rainer
- Annona frutescens R.E.Fr.
- Annona gardneri R.E.Fr.
- Annona gigantophylla (R.E.Fr.) R.E.Fr.
- Annona glabra L.
- Annona glauca Schumach. & Thonn.
- Annona glaucophylla R.E.Fr.
- Annona globiflora Schltdl.
- Annona glomerulifera (Maas & Westra) H.Rainer
- Annona gracilis R.E.Fr.
- Annona granvilleana Maas & H.Rainer
- Annona haematantha Miq.
- Annona haitiensis R.E.Fr.
- Annona havanensis R.E.Fr.
- Annona hayesii Saff.
- Annona helosioides (Maas & Westra) H.Rainer
- Annona herzogii (R.E.Fr.) H.Rainer
- Annona hispida (Maas & Westra) H.Rainer
- Annona holosericea Saff.
- Annona hypoglauca Mart.
- Annona hystricoides A.H.Gentry
- Annona imparilis H.Rainer
- Annona inconformis Pittier
- Annona insignis R.E.Fr.
- Annona ionophylla Triana & Planch.
- Annona iquitensis R.E.Fr.
- Annona jahnii Saff.
- Annona jamaicensis Sprague
- Annona jucunda (Diels) H.Rainer
- Annona leptopetala (R.E.Fr.) H.Rainer
- Annona liebmanniana Baill.
- Annona longiflora S.Watson
- Annona longipedicellata A.C.Webber & Gottsb.
- Annona longipes Saff.
- Annona macrocalyx R.E.Fr.
- Annona macroprophyllata Donn.Sm.
- Annona malmeana R.E.Fr.
- Annona mammifera (Maas & Westra) H.Rainer
- Annona manabiensis Saff. ex R.E.Fr.
- Annona maritima (Záchia) H.Rainer
- Annona membranacea R.E.Fr.
- Annona micrantha Bertero ex Spreng.
- Annona moaensis León & Alain
- Annona montana Macfad.
- Annona monticola Mart.
- Annona mucosa Jacq.
- Annona muricata L.
- Annona nana Exell
- Annona neglecta R.E.Fr.
- Annona neoamazonica H.Rainer
- Annona neochrysocarpa H.Rainer
- Annona neoecuadorensis H.Rainer
- Annona neoelliptica H.Rainer & Maas
- Annona neoinsignis H.Rainer
- Annona neosalicifolia H.Rainer
- Annona neosericea H.Rainer
- Annona neoulei H.Rainer
- Annona neovelutina H.Rainer
- Annona nipensis Alain
- Annona nitida Mart.
- Annona nutans (R.E.Fr.) R.E.Fr.
- Annona oblongifolia R.E.Fr.
- Annona oleifolia Westra & H.Rainer
- Annona oligocarpa R.E.Fr.
- Annona oxapampae Maas & Westra
- Annona pachyantha (Maas & Westra) H.Rainer
- Annona palmeri Saff.
- Annona paludosa Aubl.
- Annona papilionella (Diels) H.Rainer
- Annona paraensis R.E.Fr.
- Annona paraguayensis R.E.Fr.
- Annona parviflora (A.St.-Hil.) H.Rainer
- Annona penicillata H.Rainer
- Annona pickelii (Diels) H.Rainer
- Annona pittieri Donn.Sm.
- Annona poeppigii (Mart.) Maas & Westra
- Annona praetermissa Rendle
- Annona pruinosa Schatz
- Annona punicifolia Triana & Planch.
- Annona purpurea Moc. & Sessé ex Dunal
- Annona quinduensis Kunth
- Annona rensoniana (Standl.) H.Rainer
- Annona reticulata L.
- Annona rigida R.E.Fr.
- Annona rosei Saff.
- Annona rufinervis (Triana & Planch.) H.Rainer
- Annona rugulosa (Schltdl.) H.Rainer
- Annona saffordiana R.E.Fr.
- Annona salicifolia Ekman & R.E.Fr.
- Annona salzmannii A.DC.
- Annona sanctae-crucis S.Moore
- Annona scandens Diels ex Pilg.
- Annona schunkei (Maas & Westra) H.Rainer
- Annona scleroderma Saff.
- Annona sclerophylla Saff.
- Annona senegalensis Pers.
- Annona sericea Dunal
- Annona spinescens Mart.
- Annona spraguei Saff.
- Annona squamosa L.
- Annona stenophylla Engl. & Diels
- Annona sylvatica A.St.-Hil.
- Annona symphyocarpa Sandwith
- Annona tenuiflora Mart.
- Annona tomentosa R.E.Fr.
- Annona urbaniana R.E.Fr.
- Annona vepretorum Mart.
- Annona volubilis Lundell
- Annona warmingiana Mello-Silva & Pirani
- Annona williamsii (Rusby ex R.E.Fr.) H.Rainer
- Annona xylopiifolia A.St.-Hil. & Tul.
