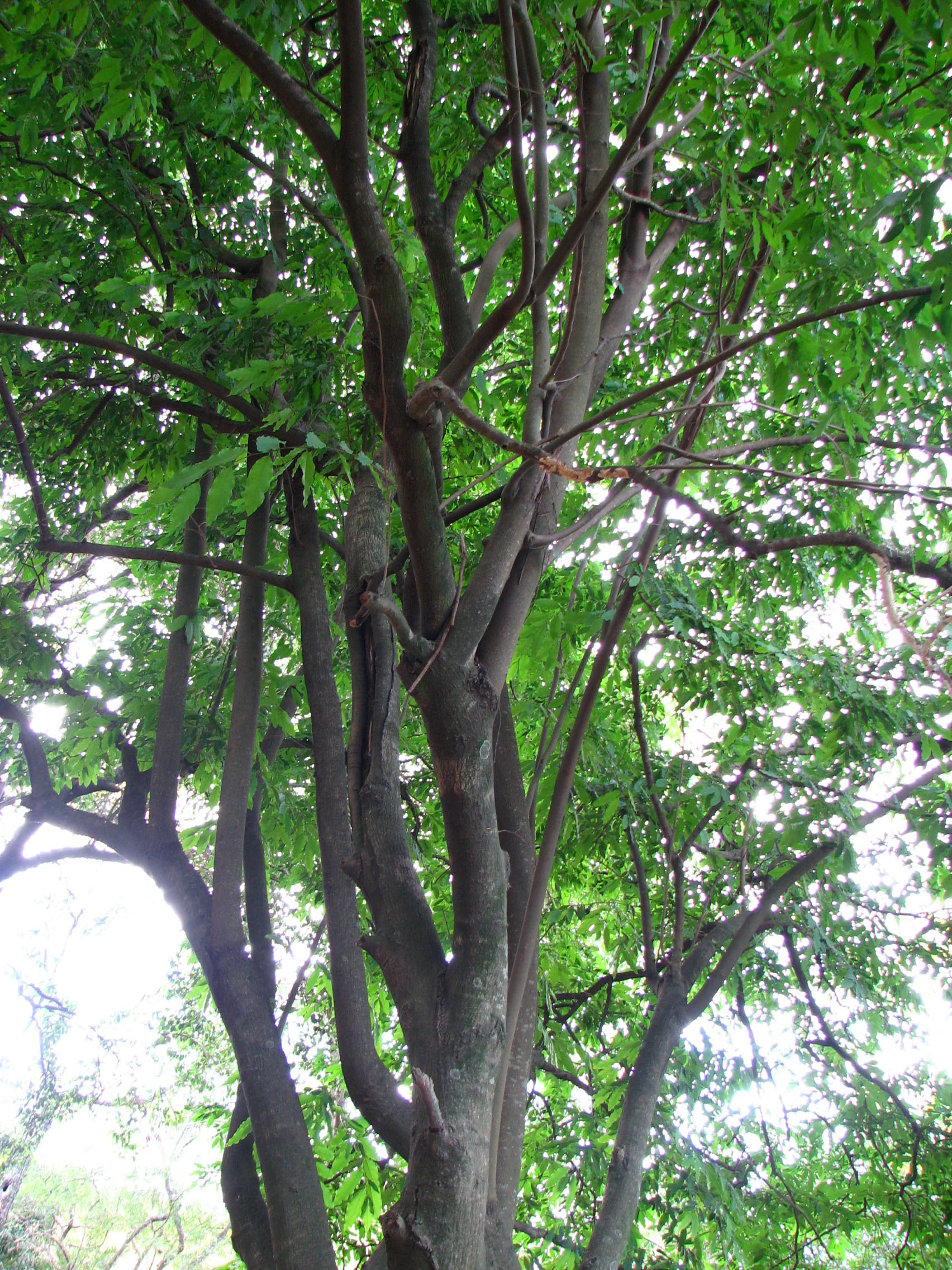
- Rollinia emarginata

Scientific classification
- Kingdom: Plantae
- Clade: Embryophytes
- Clade: Tracheophytes
- Clade: Spermatophytes
- Clade: Angiosperms
- Clade: Magnoliids
- Order: Magnoliales
- Family: Annonaceae
- Genus: Rollinia; A.St.-Hil.

Species
- Approx. 65 species

= Rollinia =

Genus of flowering plants

Rollinia is a genus of plants in the family Annonaceae. While it is widely recognised as a distinct genus, a monograph published in 2006 advocates its inclusion in Annona, which also contains custard apples and soursops.

Some Rollinia species produce edible fruits, such as biriba (Rollinia deliciosa). The flavor of the fruit is similar to that of a lemon meringue pie. Ripe fruit is very soft and easily bruised, and cannot be stored for long periods of time. It is usually eaten fresh, but it is also occasionally used in Brazil to make wine. Biriba trees are small to medium in size, and require humid, tropical growing conditions. The fruit is round, ripening from green to yellow, and the skin is covered with small projections that bruise to black when the fruit is handled. Not widely cultivated, they have gained a small degree of popularity as dooryard and container trees elsewhere in the world. Rollinia sylvatica and Rollinia emarginata – the latter referred to as aratiku – also produce edible fruit, but are comparatively little-known and only very rarely cultivated.

A common pest of Rollinia is the giant silk moth (Arsenura armida), which roosts in masses on the trunks of the trees.

== Selected species ==
- Rollinia amazonica R.E.Fr.
- Rollinia andicola P.Maas & Westra
- Rollinia bahiensis P.Maas & Westra
- Rollinia boliviana R.E.Fr.
- Rollinia calcarata R.E.Fr.
- Rollinia centrantha R.E.Fr.
- Rollinia chrysocarpa P.Maas & Westra
- Rollinia dolichopetala R.E.Fries
- Rollinia ecuadorensis R.E.Fr.
- Rollinia edulis Triana & Planch.
- Rollinia emarginata Schltdl.
  - Rollinia glaucescens Sond.
- Rollinia fendleri R.E.Fries
- Rollinia ferruginea (R.E.Fries) P.Maas & Westra
- Rollinia helosioides P.Maas & Westra
- Rollinia herzogii
- Rollinia hispida P.Maas & Westra
- Rollinia jimenezii
- Rollinia laurifolia Schltdl.
- Rollinia leptopetala R.E.Fr.
  - Rolliniopsis discreta Saff.
- Rollinia mucosa (Jacq.) Baill.
- Rollinia occidentalis R.E.Fr.
- Rollinia pachyantha P.Maas & Westra
- Rollinia parviflora A.St.-Hil.
  - Rolliniopsis parviflora (A.St.-Hil.) Saff.
- Rollinia pickelii Diels
- Rollinia rufinervis Triana & Planchon
- Rollinia sylvatica (A.St.-Hil.) Mart.
  - Annona sylvatica A.St.-Hil.
- Rollinia ubatubensis P.Maas & Westra
- Rollinia velutina van Marle
- Rollinia xylopiifolia (A.St.-Hil.) R.E.Fr.

=== Formerly placed here ===
- Rollinia deliciosa and Rollinia mucosa (Jacq.) Baill., see Annona mucosa
- Rollinia longifolia Raddi and R. dolabripetala (Raddi) R.E.Fr., see Annona dolabripetala
