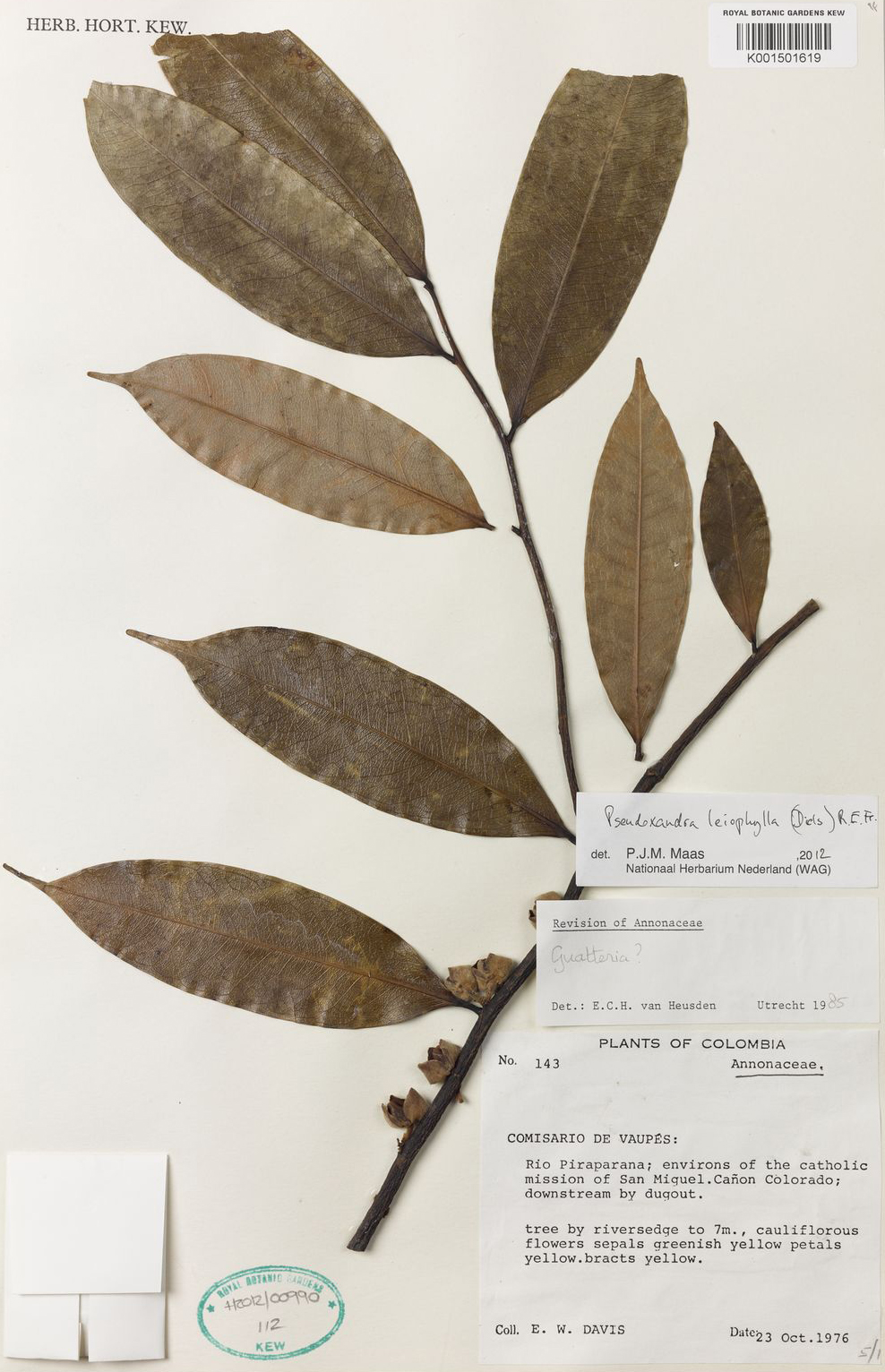
- Herbarium specimen of Pseudoxandra leiophylla

Conservation status
- Least Concern (IUCN 3.1)

Scientific classification
- Kingdom: Plantae
- Clade: Embryophytes
- Clade: Tracheophytes
- Clade: Spermatophytes
- Clade: Angiosperms
- Clade: Magnoliids
- Order: Magnoliales
- Family: Annonaceae
- Genus: Pseudoxandra
- Species: P. leiophylla

Binomial name
- Pseudoxandra leiophylla (Diels) R.E.Fr.

Synonyms
- Pseudoxandra coriacea R.E.Fr. Unonopsis leiophylla Diels

= Pseudoxandra leiophylla =

Species of plant in the soursop family

Pseudoxandra leiophylla is a species of plant in the family Annonaceae. It is native to northern Brazil, Colombia, and Venezuela. Ludwig Diels, the German botanist who first formally described the species using the basionym Unonopsis leiophylla, named it after its smooth (Latinized form of Greek λεῖος, leîos) leaves.

== Description ==
It is a tree reaching 4 to 25 meters (13 to 82 ft) in height. Its shiny leathery leaves are 10–20 by 4–7 centimeters and come to a point at their tips. The leaves are hairless on their upper and lower surfaces, but can have warty bumps. The leaves are dark brown, greenish brown or black-brown above and brown or dark brown on their underside. Its petioles are 2–8 millimeters long. Its flowers are solitary or in pairs and axillary. Each flower is on a pedicel 1–5 millimeters long. Its flowers have 3 oval-shaped sepals that are 2–5 by 4–7 millimeters. The sepals are hairy when young, but smooth when mature. Its 6 petals are arranged in two rows of 3. The outer petals are white, 7–12 by 7–8 millimeters, and concave. The outer petals are densely hairy on their outer surface. The inner petals are white, 5–9 by 4–5 millimeters, and concave. The inner petals are smooth on their outer surface except for a densely hairy patch running from the tip to the base. It has numerous stamens that are 1.5–3 millimeters long. Each flower has 2–15 monocarps that are yellow, brown, red or black at maturity and 9–14 millimeters wide. Its shiny brown seeds are 4–9 by 7–9 millimeters.

=== Reproductive biology ===
The pollen of P. leiophylla is shed as permanent tetrads.
