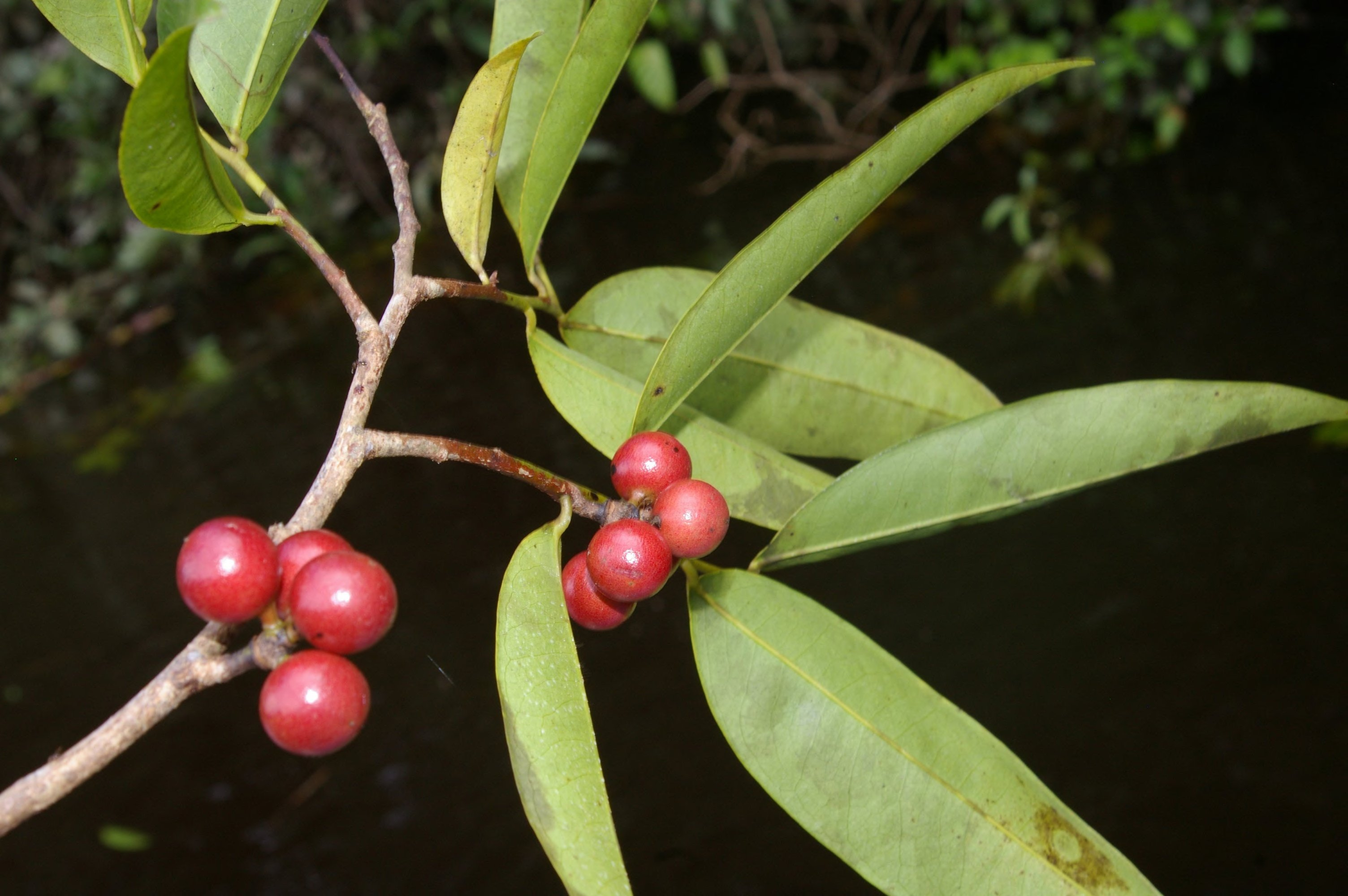
- Pseudoxandra polyphleba with fruit

Conservation status
- Least Concern (IUCN 3.1)

Scientific classification
- Kingdom: Plantae
- Clade: Embryophytes
- Clade: Tracheophytes
- Clade: Spermatophytes
- Clade: Angiosperms
- Clade: Magnoliids
- Order: Magnoliales
- Family: Annonaceae
- Genus: Pseudoxandra
- Species: P. polyphleba

Binomial name
- Pseudoxandra polyphleba (Diels) R.E.Fr.

Synonyms
- Cremastosperma polyphlebum (Diels) R.E.Fr.; Unonopsis polyphleba Diels

= Pseudoxandra polyphleba =

Species of plant in the soursop family

Pseudoxandra polyphleba is a species of flowering plant in the family Annonaceae. It is a shrub or tree native to Bolivia, northern Brazil, Colombia, French Guiana, Guyana, and Peru. Ludwig Diels, the German botanist who first formally described the species using the basionym Unonopsis polyphleba, named it after the distinctive veins (Latinized form of Greek φλέβα, phléba) in its leaves.

== Description ==
It is a tree reaching 4 to 15 meters (13 to 49 ft) in height. Its dull papery leaves are 10–19 by 3–6 centimeters and come to a point at their tips. The leaves are hairless on their upper and lower surfaces, but can have small warty bumps. The leaves have 10–15 distinct, straight secondary veins emanating from the primary vein. Its petioles are 2–7 millimeters long. Its flowers are solitary or in pairs and axillary. Each flower is on a pedicel 2–5 millimeters long. Its flowers have 3 oval-shaped sepals that are 1–2 by 2–3 millimeters. The outer surface of the sepals is hairless or slightly hairy. Its 6 petals are arranged in two rows of 3. The outer petals are white to yellow and 4–10 by 3–5 millimeters. The outer petals are hairless on their outer surface. The inner petals are similarly colored and 3–8 by 3–5 millimeters. The inner petals are smooth on their outer surface. It has numerous stamens that are 1.5–1.7 millimeters long. Each flower has 2–20 monocarps that are yellow, red, or near black at maturity and 10–15 millimeters wide. Its brown seeds are 8–13 by 7–12 millimeters.

=== Reproductive biology ===
The pollen of P. polyphleba is shed as permanent tetrads.
