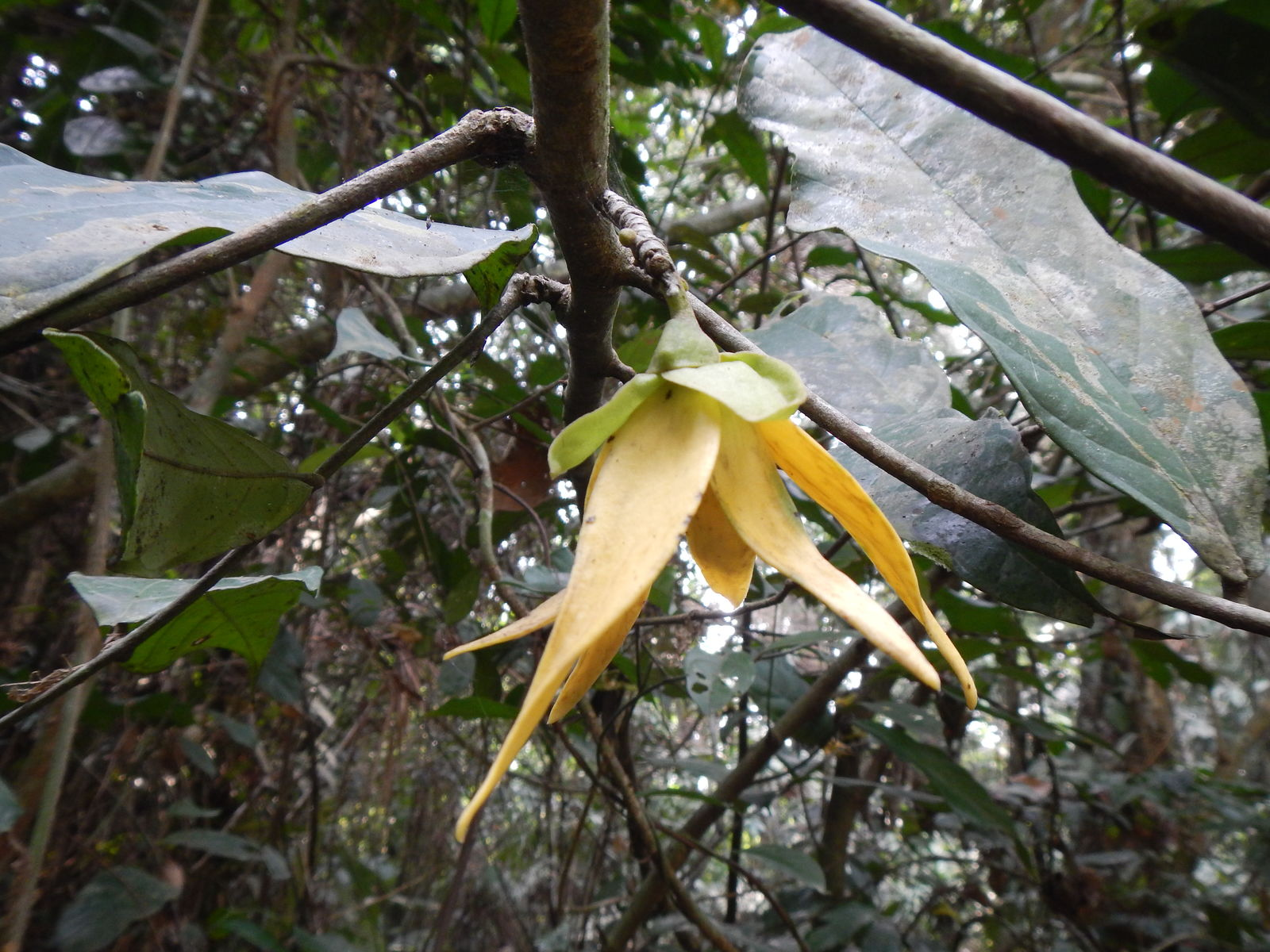
- Anonidium letestui

Scientific classification
- Kingdom: Plantae
- Clade: Tracheophytes
- Clade: Angiosperms
- Clade: Magnoliids
- Order: Magnoliales
- Family: Annonaceae
- Genus: Anonidium; Engl. & Diels

= Anonidium =

Genus of flowering plants

Anonidium is a genus of plants in family Annonaceae.

As of January 2025, Plants of the World Online accepts the following 5 species:

- Anonidium brieyi De Wild.
- Anonidium floribundum Pellegr.
- Anonidium letestui Pellegr.
- Anonidium mannii Engl. & Diels
- Anonidium usambarense R.E.Fr.
