= Anonidium usambarense =

Conservation status
- Data Deficient (IUCN 3.1)

Scientific classification
- Kingdom: Plantae
- Clade: Tracheophytes
- Clade: Angiosperms
- Clade: Magnoliids
- Order: Magnoliales
- Family: Annonaceae
- Genus: Anonidium
- Species: A. usambarense

Binomial name
- Anonidium usambarense R.E.Fr.

Extinct species of flowering plant

Anonidium usambarense was a tall tree in the family Annonaceae, formerly endemic to Tanzania. A single specimen was collected in 1910 at Amani in the Usambara mountains, at an elevation of 900m. In spite of intensive field work in the region looking specifically for this species, no other examples were found and it was declared extinct in 1998. The causes for its disappearance were the timber industry and the desire to expand agricultural land.

It is currently declared as 'data deficient' due to confusion about the type specimen.
