= Pseudoxandra williamsii =

Conservation status
- Data Deficient (IUCN 3.1)

Scientific classification
- Kingdom: Plantae
- Clade: Embryophytes
- Clade: Tracheophytes
- Clade: Spermatophytes
- Clade: Angiosperms
- Clade: Magnoliids
- Order: Magnoliales
- Family: Annonaceae
- Genus: Pseudoxandra
- Species: P. williamsii

Binomial name
- Pseudoxandra williamsii (R.E.Fr.) R.E.Fr.

Synonyms
- Cremastosperma williamsii R.E.Fr.

Species of plant

Pseudoxandra williamsii is a species of plant in the Annonaceae family. It is endemic to Peru. Robert Elias Fries, the Swedish botanist who first formally described the species using the basionym Cremastosperma williamsii, named it after Llewelyn W. Williams, the Welsh economic botanist, who collected the holotype specimen he examined.

== Description ==
It is a bush. Its shiny, brown, papery leaves are 16-20 by 4-5 centimeters and come to a point at their tips. The mature leaves are hairless on their upper surfaces and lightly hairy on their lower surfaces. The leaves have 10-12 distinct, curved secondary veins emanating from the primary vein. Its petioles are 4-5 millimeters long. Each flower is on a short pedicel less than 1 millimeter long. Its flowers have 3 oval-shaped sepals that are 5 by 8 millimeters. The outer surface of the sepals is covered in dense white hairs. Its 6 petals are arranged in two rows of 3. The outer petals 11-12 by 9 millimeters and their outer surface is covered by dense white hairs. The inner petals are 6-7 by 5-6 millimeters and concave. The inner petals are smooth on their outer surface except for a hairy patch running from the base to the tip. It has numerous stamens that are 3.5-4 millimeters long.

=== Reproductive biology ===
The pollen of P. williamsii is shed as permanent tetrads.
