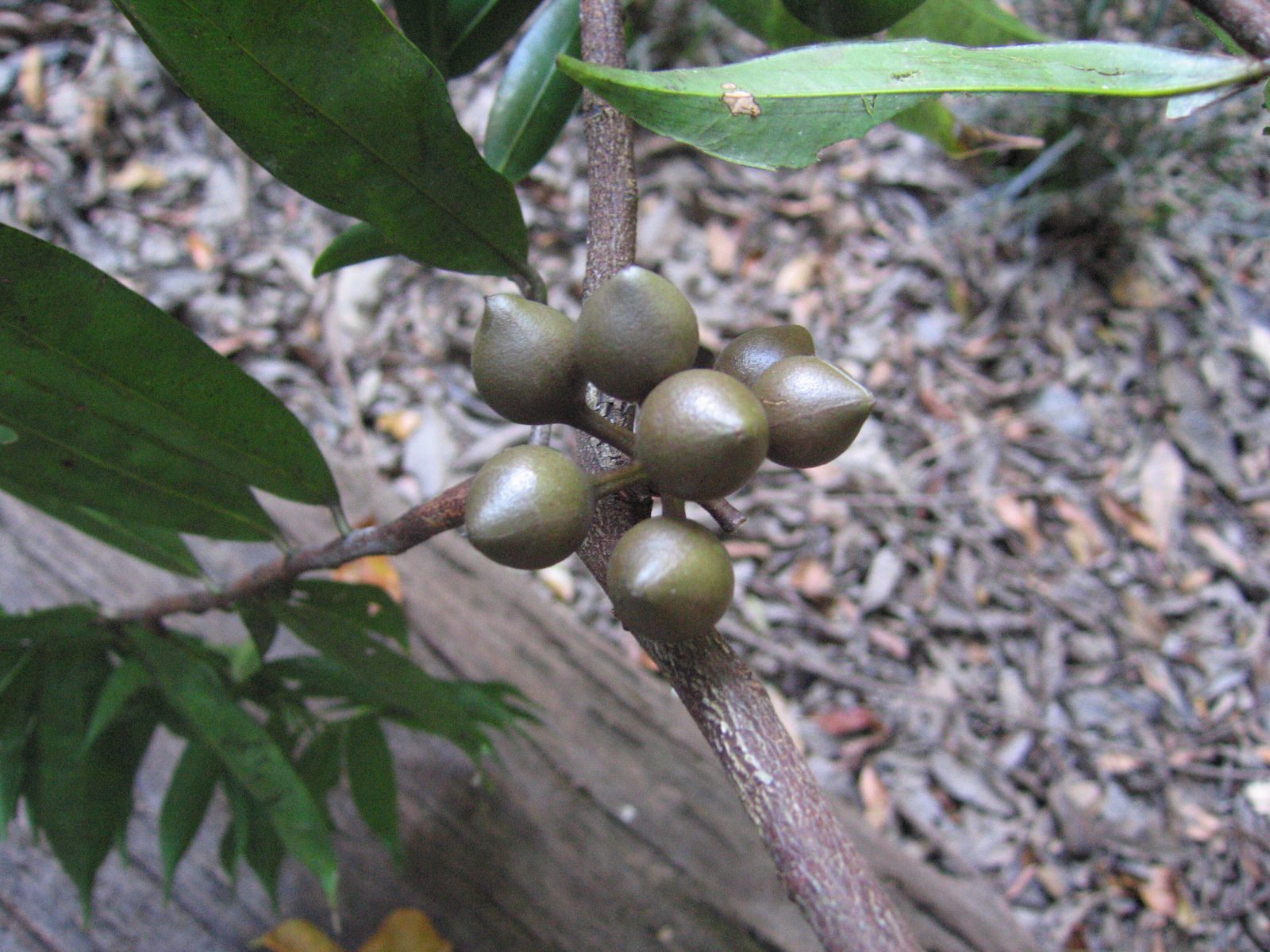

Conservation status
- Least Concern (IUCN 3.1)

Scientific classification
- Kingdom: Plantae
- Clade: Embryophytes
- Clade: Tracheophytes
- Clade: Spermatophytes
- Clade: Angiosperms
- Clade: Magnoliids
- Order: Magnoliales
- Family: Annonaceae
- Genus: Pseudoxandra
- Species: P. laevigata

Binomial name
- Pseudoxandra laevigata (Mart.) Maas

Synonyms
- Homotypic: Guatteria laevigata Mart.; Heterotypic: Cremastosperma guianense R.E.Fr.; Malmea cuspidata Diels; Pseudoxandra guianensis (R.E.Fr.) R.E.Fr.; Pseudoxandra lucida R.E.Fr.

= Pseudoxandra laevigata =

Species of flowering plant

Pseudoxandra laevigata is a species of flowering plant in the custard apple family Annonaceae. It is a tree native to Bolivia, northern and west-central Brazil, southeastern Colombia, Guyana, Peru, southwestern Suriname, and Venezuela.

== Description ==
It is a tree reaching 3 to 20 meters (9.8 to 65.6 ft) in height. Its shiny leathery leaves are 7–20 by 2–6.5 centimeters and come to a point at their tips. The leaves are hairless on their upper and lower surfaces, but can have small warty bumps. The leaves are green, greenish brown or dark brown above and brown on their underside. Its petioles are 5–8 millimeters long. Its flowers are solitary or in pairs and axillary. Each flower is on a pedicel 2–5 millimeters long. Its flowers have 3 oval-shaped sepals that are 1.5–3 by 3–5 millimeters. The outer surface of the sepals is densely hairy. Its 6 petals are arranged in two rows of 3. The outer petals are pale green to yellow and 8–11 by 6–10 millimeters. The outer petals are densely hairy on their outer surface. The inner petals are similarly colored, 7–14 by 5–7 millimeters, and concave. The inner petals are smooth on their outer surface except for a hairy patch running from the tip to the base. It has numerous stamens that are 2–3.5 millimeters long. Each flower has 2–20 monocarps that are red, orange, purple or black at maturity and 9–14 millimeters wide. Its brown seeds are 8–12 by 9–11 millimeters.

=== Reproductive biology ===
The pollen of P. laevigata is shed as permanent tetrads.
