= Anonidium brieyi =

Conservation status
- Near Threatened (IUCN 3.1)

Scientific classification
- Kingdom: Plantae
- Clade: Embryophytes
- Clade: Tracheophytes
- Clade: Spermatophytes
- Clade: Angiosperms
- Clade: Magnoliids
- Order: Magnoliales
- Family: Annonaceae
- Genus: Anonidium
- Species: A. brieyi

Binomial name
- Anonidium brieyi De Wild.

Synonyms
- Anonidium mannii var. brieyi (De Wild.) R.E.Fr.; Anonidium friesianum Exell

Species of flowering plant

Anonidium brieyi is a species of flowering plant in the custard apple family Annonaceae. It is a tree native to Cabinda, Cameroon, Republic of the Congo, Democratic Republic of the Congo, and Gabon in West Central Africa. It is listed as near threatened by the IUCN.
