= Onychopetalum =

Scientific classification
- Kingdom: Plantae
- Clade: Tracheophytes
- Clade: Angiosperms
- Clade: Magnoliids
- Order: Magnoliales
- Family: Annonaceae
- Tribe: Malmeeae
- Genus: Onychopetalum; R.E.Fr.

Genus of plants

Onychopetalum is a genus of flowering plants belonging to the family Annonaceae.

Its native range is Southern Tropical America.

Species:

- Onychopetalum amazonicum R.E.Fr.
- Onychopetalum periquino (Rusby) D.M.Johnson & N.A.Murray
