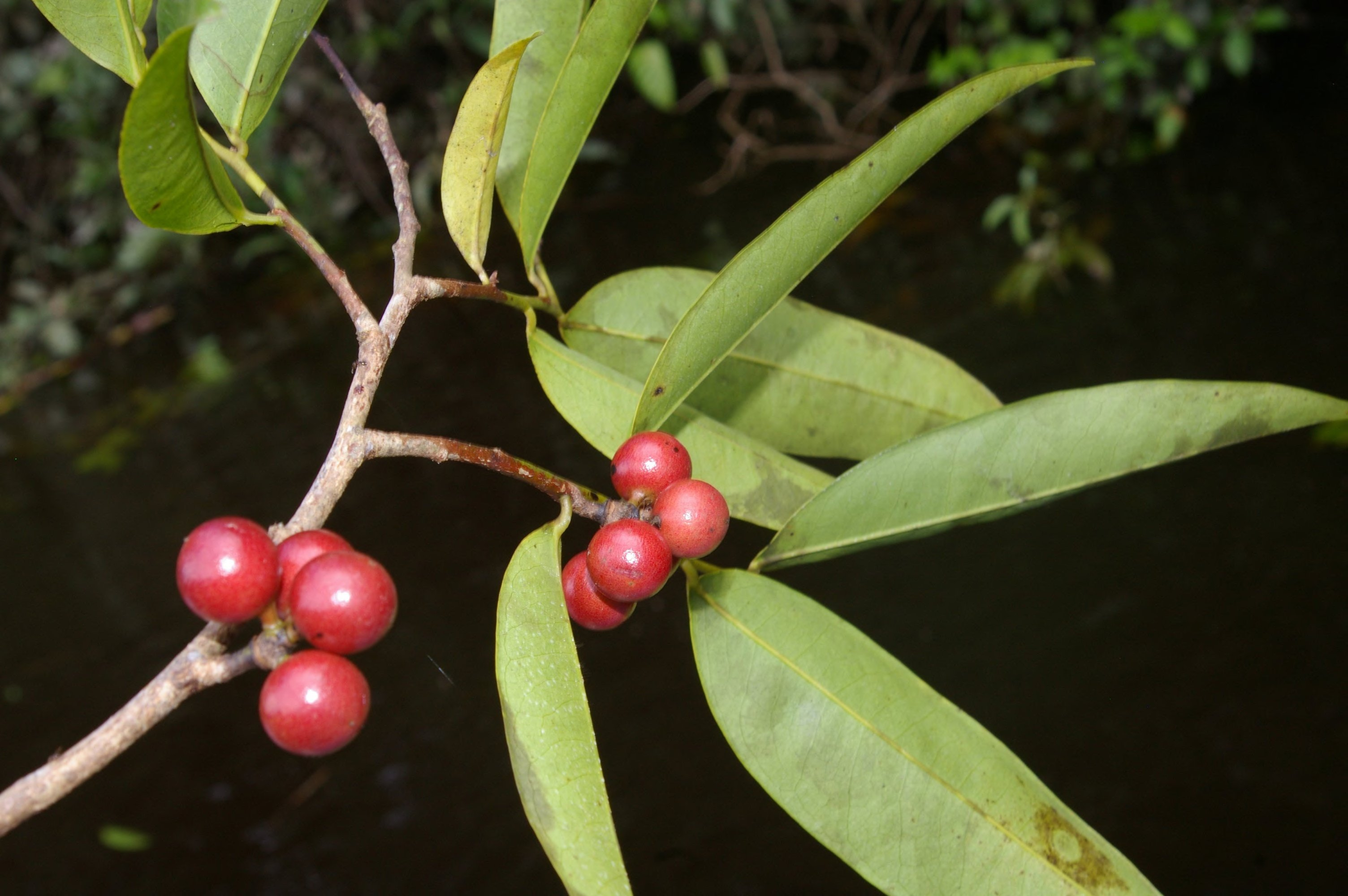
- Pseudoxandra polyphleba

Scientific classification
- Kingdom: Plantae
- Clade: Tracheophytes
- Clade: Angiosperms
- Clade: Magnoliids
- Order: Magnoliales
- Family: Annonaceae
- Genus: Pseudoxandra; R.E.Fr.

= Pseudoxandra =

Genus of plants

Pseudoxandra is a genus of flowering plants in family Annonaceae. It contains 24 species native to tropical South America.

== Species ==
24 species are accepted:

- Pseudoxandra acreana Maas
- Pseudoxandra angustifolia Maas
- Pseudoxandra atrata Maas
- Pseudoxandra bahiensis Maas
- Pseudoxandra borbensis Maas
- Pseudoxandra cauliflora Maas
- Pseudoxandra cuspidata Maas
- Pseudoxandra duckei Maas
- Pseudoxandra laevigata (Mart.) Maas
- Pseudoxandra leiophylla (Diels) R.E.Fr.
- Pseudoxandra longipes Maas
- Pseudoxandra obscurinervis Maas
- Pseudoxandra pacifica Maas
- Pseudoxandra papillosa Maas
- Pseudoxandra parvifolia Maas
- Pseudoxandra pilosa Maas
- Pseudoxandra polyphleba (Diels) R.E.Fr.
- Pseudoxandra revoluta Maas
- Pseudoxandra rionegrensis Maas
- Pseudoxandra sclerocarpa Maas
- Pseudoxandra spiritus-sancti Maas
- Pseudoxandra vallicola Maas
- Pseudoxandra williamsii (R.E.Fr.) R.E.Fr.
- Pseudoxandra xylopiifolia Maas & Westra
