= Onychopetalum amazonicum =

Scientific classification
- Kingdom: Plantae
- Clade: Embryophytes
- Clade: Tracheophytes
- Clade: Angiosperms
- Clade: Magnoliids
- Order: Magnoliales
- Family: Annonaceae
- Genus: Onychopetalum
- Species: O. amazonicum

Binomial name
- Onychopetalum amazonicum R.E.Fr.

Synonyms
- Onychopetalum lanceolatum R.E.Fr.; Onychopetalum lanceolatum lanceolatum

Species of flowering plant

Onychopetalum amazonicum is a tree in the Annonaceae family. It grows from Venezuela and Guyana to west Brazil.
