= Annona oligocarpa =

Conservation status
- Endangered (IUCN 3.1)

Scientific classification
- Kingdom: Plantae
- Clade: Tracheophytes
- Clade: Angiosperms
- Clade: Magnoliids
- Order: Magnoliales
- Family: Annonaceae
- Genus: Annona
- Species: A. oligocarpa

Binomial name
- Annona oligocarpa R.E.Fr.

Species of flowering plant

Annona oligocarpa is a species of plant in the Annonaceae family. It is endemic to Ecuador. Its natural habitats are subtropical or tropical dry forests and subtropical or tropical moist lowland forests. It is threatened by habitat loss.
