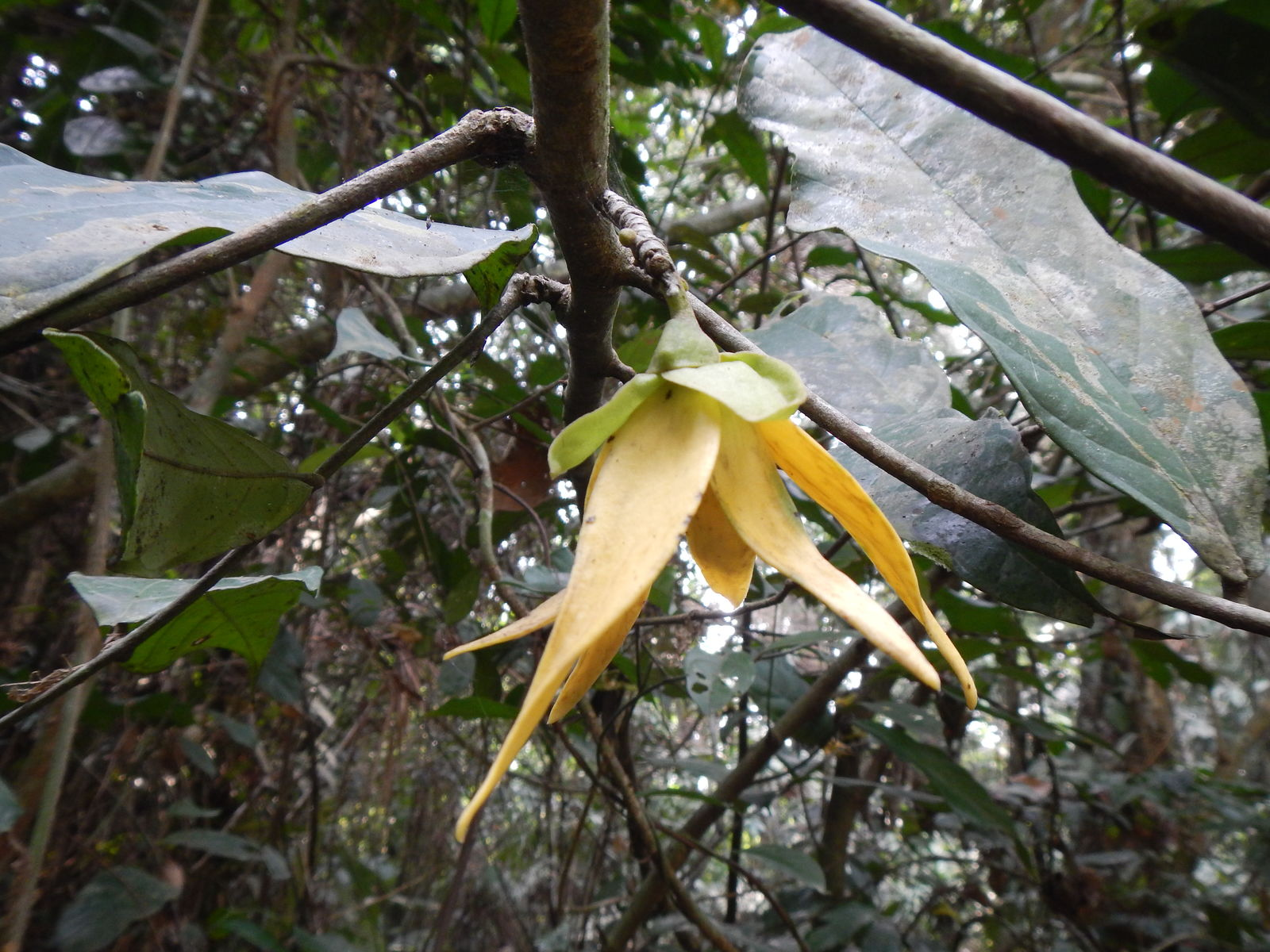
- Flower

Conservation status
- Endangered (IUCN 3.1)

Scientific classification
- Kingdom: Plantae
- Clade: Embryophytes
- Clade: Tracheophytes
- Clade: Spermatophytes
- Clade: Angiosperms
- Clade: Magnoliids
- Order: Magnoliales
- Family: Annonaceae
- Genus: Anonidium
- Species: A. letestui

Binomial name
- Anonidium letestui Pellegr.

= Anonidium letestui =

Species of flowering plant

Anonidium letestui is a species of flowering plant in the custard apple family Annonaceae. It is a shrub native to Gabon and Congo in West Central Africa. It is listed as endangered by the IUCN.
