= Annona cubensis =

Conservation status
- Endangered (IUCN 3.1)

Scientific classification
- Kingdom: Plantae
- Clade: Tracheophytes
- Clade: Angiosperms
- Clade: Magnoliids
- Order: Magnoliales
- Family: Annonaceae
- Genus: Annona
- Species: A. cubensis

Binomial name
- Annona cubensis R.E.Fr.

Species of plant

Annona cubensis is a species of flowering plant in the family Annonaceae. It is a tree endemic to the Sierra de Nipe in eastern Cuba.
