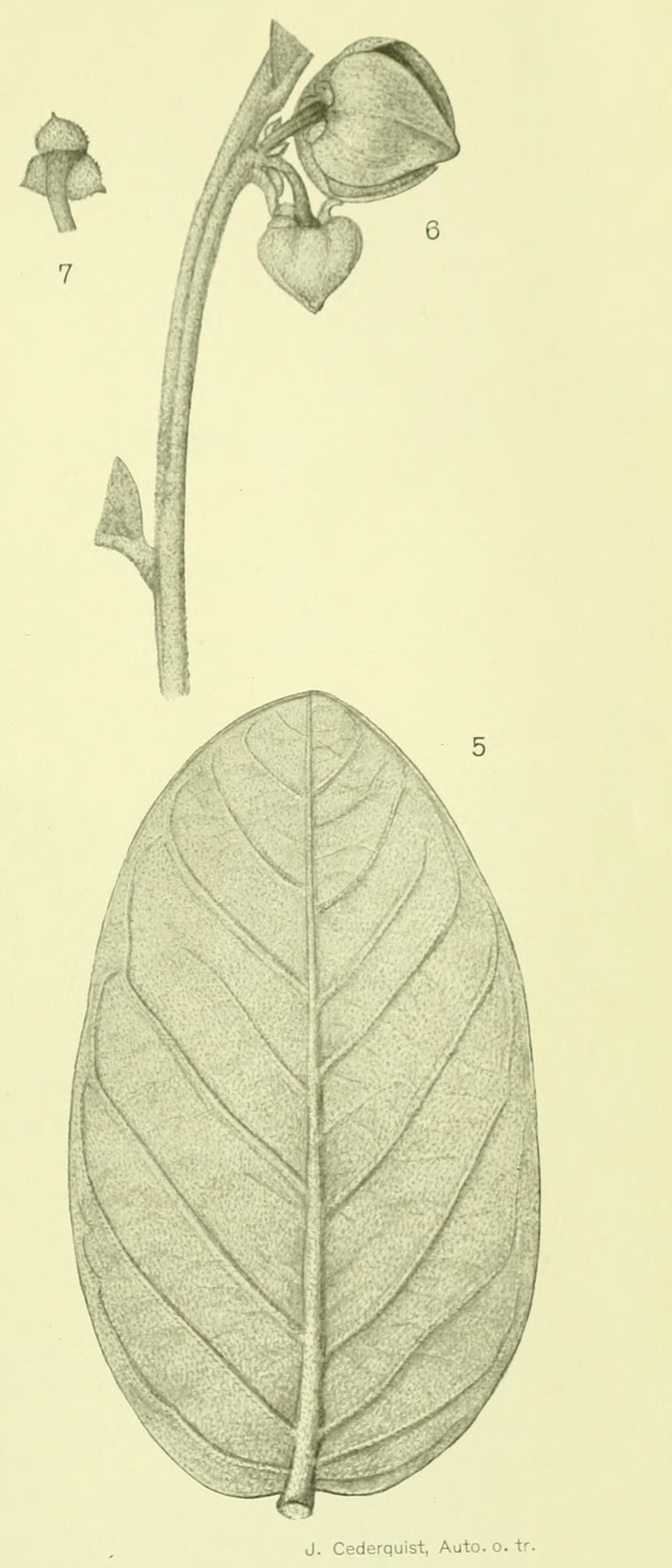
- Scientific illustration of Annona tomentosa

Conservation status
- Least Concern (IUCN 3.1)

Scientific classification
- Kingdom: Plantae
- Clade: Tracheophytes
- Clade: Angiosperms
- Clade: Magnoliids
- Order: Magnoliales
- Family: Annonaceae
- Genus: Annona
- Species: A. tomentosa

Binomial name
- Annona tomentosa R.E.Fr.

= Annona tomentosa =

Species of plant

Annona tomentosa is a species of plant in the family Annonaceae. It is native to Bolivia and Brazil. Robert Elias Fries, the Swedish botanist who first formally described the species, named it after the dense woolly hairs (tomentosus in Latin) covering its branches and leaves.

== Description ==
It is a bush reaching 0.5-1.5 meters in height. The younger branches are covered in yellow-brown, dense, woolly hairs. Its internodes are 1-4 centimeters long. Its petioles are 3-4 millimeters long and covered in dense woolly hairs. Its oblong to oval leaves are 7-19 by 3.5-9 centimeters. The leaves are rounded or indented at their base and come to a tapered point at their tip. The leaves are covered in dense hair on their upper and lower surfaces. The leaves have 8-18 secondary veins emanating at an acute angle from either side of the midrib. Inflorescences emerge between nodes and have 1-2 flowers. Its pedicels are 1.5 centimeters long and have two kidney-shaped bracts that enclose their base. Its rounded sepals come to a point at the tip, are covered in dense woolly hairs on their outer surface, and are hairless on their inner surface. Its outer petals are 1.7 by 2 centimeters and come to a taper point or have blunt tips. The outer surfaces of the outer petals are covered in dense grey-yellow hairs. Its inner petals are 0.6-0.7 by 2 centimeters, have a keeled back and come to a point at their tip. Its stamens are 3 millimeters long. Its ovaries are covered in dense white hairs.

=== Reproductive biology ===
The pollen of Annona tomentosa is shed as permanent tetrads. Pollinators include Cyclocephala beetles.

=== Habitat and distribution ===
It has been observed in fields with dry sand dunes.

=== Uses ===
It is used in Brazilian traditional medicine and extracts from the leaves have been reported to provide antinociceptive pain relief and have anti-inflammatory activity in studies with mice.
