= Annona ekmanii =

Conservation status
- Critically Endangered (IUCN 3.1)

Scientific classification
- Kingdom: Plantae
- Clade: Tracheophytes
- Clade: Angiosperms
- Clade: Magnoliids
- Order: Magnoliales
- Family: Annonaceae
- Genus: Annona
- Species: A. ekmanii

Binomial name
- Annona ekmanii R.E.Fr.

Species of flowering plant

Annona ekmanii is a species of flowering plant in the Annonaceae family. It is a shrub or tree endemic to the Sierra de Nipe in eastern Cuba.

The species was first described by Robert Elias Fries in 1927.
