= Anonidium floribundum =

Conservation status
- Least Concern (IUCN 3.1)

Scientific classification
- Kingdom: Plantae
- Clade: Embryophytes
- Clade: Tracheophytes
- Clade: Spermatophytes
- Clade: Angiosperms
- Clade: Magnoliids
- Order: Magnoliales
- Family: Annonaceae
- Genus: Anonidium
- Species: A. floribundum

Binomial name
- Anonidium floribundum Pellegr.

Species of flowering plant

Anonidium floribundum is a species of flowering plant in the custard apple family Annonaceae. It is a shrub or tree native to Gabon in West Central Africa. It is listed as least concern by the IUCN.
