= Annona haitiensis =

Conservation status
- Vulnerable (IUCN 3.1)

Scientific classification
- Kingdom: Plantae
- Clade: Tracheophytes
- Clade: Angiosperms
- Clade: Magnoliids
- Order: Magnoliales
- Family: Annonaceae
- Genus: Annona
- Species: A. haitiensis

Binomial name
- Annona haitiensis R.E.Fr.

Species of flowering plant

Annona haitiensis is a species of plant in the Annonaceae family. It is endemic to the Caribbean island of Hispaniola. Robert Elias Fries, the Swedish botanist who first formally described the species, named it after Haiti where the specimen he examined was collected.

== Description ==
It is a bush reaching 1.5 meters in height. Its membranous leaves are 4-6 by 0.7-1.5 centimeters and are rounded or shallowly notched at their tip. The leaf margins are slightly rolled under. The leaves are dull, pale green on their underside. The leaves have 8-10 pairs of secondary veins emanating from their midribs. Its petioles have a channel on their upper surface, are covered with fine hairs, often curve backwards, and are 2-2.5 millimeters long. Its solitary (sometimes in pairs) flowers are on 1-2 millimeter peduncles that emerge from older leafless branches. Its triangular sepals are 1 millimeters long and covered in brown shaggy hairs. Its 3 oblong, outer petals are 1 centimeter long with rounded tips. The petals have shaggy brown hair on their outer surface. Its stamen are 1.5-1.7 millimeters long with anthers that are 1 millimeters long. Its pistils are 1.7 millimeters long with hairy ovaries and heart-shaped stigmas.

=== Reproductive biology ===
The pollen of A. haitiensis is shed as permanent tetrads.
