= Annona rigida =

Conservation status
- Data Deficient (IUCN 3.1)

Scientific classification
- Kingdom: Plantae
- Clade: Tracheophytes
- Clade: Angiosperms
- Clade: Magnoliids
- Order: Magnoliales
- Family: Annonaceae
- Genus: Annona
- Species: A. rigida

Binomial name
- Annona rigida R.E.Fr.

Species of plant

Annona rigida is a species of plant in the family Annonaceae. It is endemic to northern Brazil and Colombia. Robert Elias Fries, the Swedish botanist who first formally described the species in 1957, named it after its rigid (rigidus in Latin) leaves.

== Description ==
It is a bush. Its rigid, oblong, yellow-green leaves are 12-20 by 3-5 centimeters, hairless and have pointed tips. Its solitary flowers are on thick, rigid pedicels that are 0.5-1 centimeter long with a 3-5 millimeter oval bract near their base. Its oval to triangular sepals are 4-5 millimeters long, recurved and come to a point at their tip. It has two rows of petals. The oval, wrinkled, warty outer petals are 3 by 2 centimeters. The outer petals have margins that touch but are not fused. The outer surface of the inner petals is covered in dense woolly hairs. Its stamen are 5 millimeters long. Its immature fruit are round with a diameter of 2–3.5 centimeters and covered in conical projections. Its flowers have numerous carpels.

=== Reproductive biology ===
The pollen of A. rigida is shed as permanent tetrads.

=== Distribution and habitat ===
It grows in the Amazon rainforest.
