= Alfredo Jahn =

Venezuelan civil engineer and botanist

Dr. Alfredo Jahn Hartmann
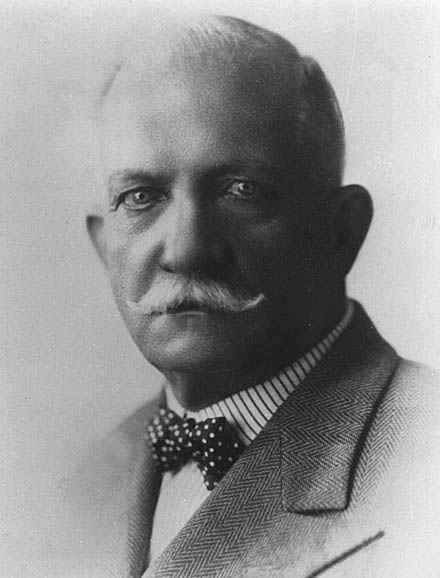
- Born: 8 October 1867; Caracas, Venezuela
- Died: 12 July 1940 (aged 72); Caracas, Venezuela
- Scientific career
- Fields: Civil engineering, botany and geography
- Author abbrev. (botany): Al.Jahn

Dr. Alfredo Jahn Hartman (8 October 1867 – 12 July 1940) was a Venezuelan civil engineer, botanist and geographer. Jahn was a member of the Academy of History, the Academy of Physical Sciences, Mathematics and Naturalist of Venezuela and the Venezuelan Society of Natural Sciences and achieved the Order of the Liberator. He was also an explorer and mountain climber. In 1911 he became the first person to ascend Pico Humboldt in the Sierra Nevada de Mérida in Venezuela.

== Background and personal life ==
Alfredo Jahn was the son of Friedrich Gottfried Alfred Jahn Wassmann, born in Caracas on 10 June 1846, and Eugenia Hartmann, born in Bremen, Germany on 8 July 1847. In 1876 he was taken to Hanover, Germany, and entered the Secondary School of the locality. He continued studies at Torgau, Saxony province, where he received military training. In 1882 he went to Berlin to continue his education for a short time, returning again to the Hannover School of Engineering. For family reasons he was forced to return to Caracas, where he continued studies at the Universidad Central de Venezuela, where he majored in natural sciences under the leadership of Adolf Ernst.

On 25 July 1891 he married Aurelia Lopez. They had a total of 10 children.

- Maria Aurelia Jahn Lopez born in Caracas on 13 June 1892
- Eugenia Jahn Lopez born in Maracay on 23 August 1893
- Alfredo Jahn Lopez born in La Victoria on 4 April 1895
- Gustavo Jahn Lopez born in La Victoria on 25 July 1896
- Margarita Jahn Lopez born in La Victoria on 6 October 1898
- Carlos Jahn Lopez born in La Victoria on 19 December 1899
- Luisa Cristina Jahn Lopez born in La Victoria on 21 June 1901
- Carmen Jahn Lopez born in Caracas on 31 January 1904
- Angelina Jahn Lopez born in Caracas on 27 May 1905
- Isabel Jahn Lopez born in Caracas on 30 January 1910

== Career ==
Jahn finished his studies at the end of 1886, and became an assistant engineer on railway construction. The following year, he participated in the preliminary studies for the construction of a major railroad between Caracas and Valencia with extension to San Carlos. He worked with civil engineer and lawyer German Jimenez in the National Plan of Highways and Railroads of Venezuela by order of the National Government. He was responsible for the construction of the railroad from Caracas to Valencia. He also built the highway from Caracas to El Junquito.

In 1887 he accompanied the Venezuelan chemist Vicente Marcano on a scientific expedition to the upper Orinoco river, sent by President Antonio Guzmán Blanco. The trip provided geographical positions and a collection of plants and archaeological objects found today in the US and Germany. He was in charge of the geographical and botanical part, which began the work of measuring and triangulation of the mountain ranges and sites and cities between Valencia and Caracas. He also carried out the topographic survey of the Lake Valencia basin and several scientific expeditions to the western region of Venezuela.1

Jahn combined his work as a geographer with his work in botany, as both required scientific work through extensive exploration. He completed measurements and triangulations of the Venezuelan Coastal Range and various sites and cities between Valencia and Caracas. He also carried out a topographic survey of the Lake Valencia drainage basin. He lived with the Orinoco Indians of the West of Venezuela and wrote books on their customs and dialects. As a botanist he classified many plants in Venezuela, donated botanical samples to the Smithsonian Institution, and wrote a book on the Palms of Venezuela (the Palms of the Flora Venezuelana – Caracas 1908).

He was a founding member of the Venezuelan Society of Natural Sciences, and served as its president in 1935 and 1937. He received an honorary doctorate from the University of Hamburg, and the Medal of the Berlin Geographical Society. He received the Order of the Liberator. The Alfredo Jahn Cave in Miranda is named for him; it is the sixth largest in the country.

== Legacy ==
The following species of plants are named after him:

- Annona jahnii Saff.

== Bibliography ==
Jahn wrote 41 works between scientific books and pamphlets, and 52 articles for newspapers and magazines, including:

- La altitud de Caracas. Caracas: Tipografía Americana, 1919.
- Aspectos físicos de Venezuela. Caracas: Editorial Cecilio Acosta, 1941.
- Contribución a la hidrografía del Orinoco y Río Negro. Caracas: Tipografía Universal, 1904.
- La cordillera venezolana de los Andes. Caracas: Revista Técnica del Ministerio de Obras Públicas, 1912.
- Los aborígenes del occidente de Venezuela: su historia, etnografía y afinidades lingüísticas. Caracas: Monte Ávila Editores, 1973.
- Los cráneos deformados de los aborígenes de los valles de Aragua: observaciones antropológicas. Caracas: Lit. del Comercio, 1932.
- Una importante contribución a la hidrografía de la Guayana venezolana. Caracas: Litografía y Tipografía Mercantil, 1931.
