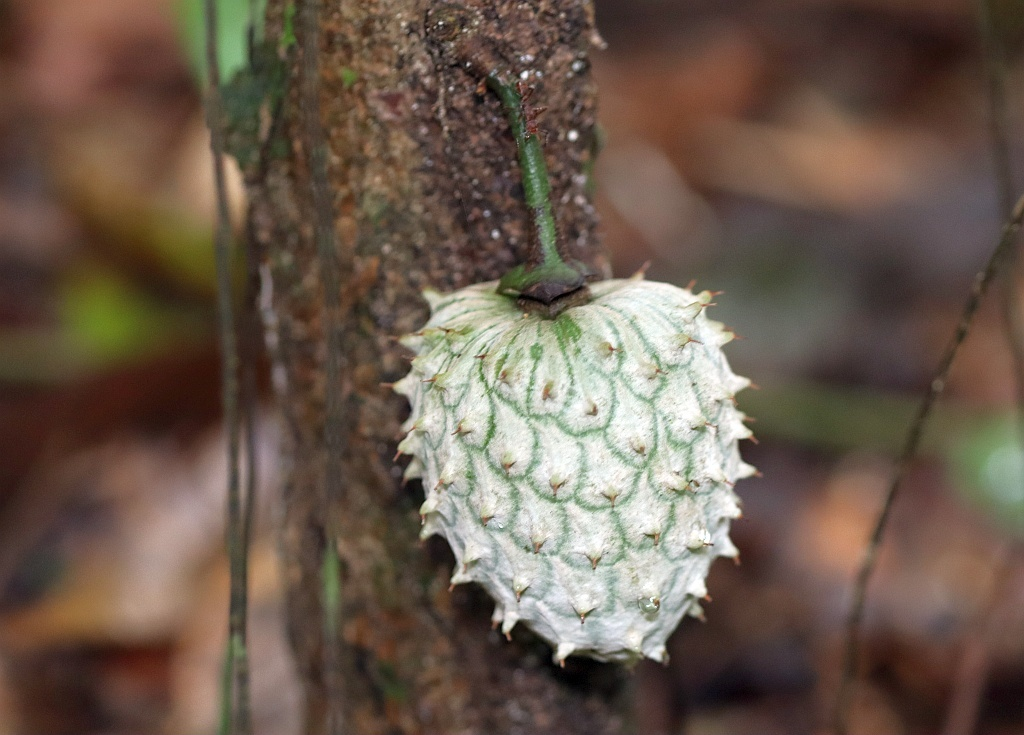

Conservation status
- Least Concern (IUCN 3.1)

Scientific classification
- Kingdom: Plantae
- Clade: Tracheophytes
- Clade: Angiosperms
- Clade: Magnoliids
- Order: Magnoliales
- Family: Annonaceae
- Genus: Annona
- Species: A. deminuta

Binomial name
- Annona deminuta R.E.Fr.

= Annona deminuta =

Species of tree

Annona deminuta is a species of flowering plant in the family Annonaceae. It is a tree native to northwestern Brazil and northern Peru. It grows in lowland Amazon rainforest.

The species was first described by Robert Elias Fries in 1931.
