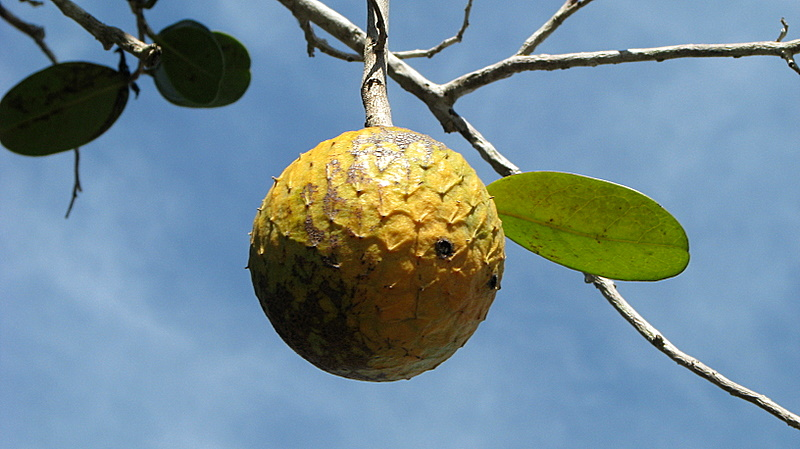

Conservation status
- Least Concern (IUCN 3.1)

Scientific classification
- Kingdom: Plantae
- Clade: Tracheophytes
- Clade: Angiosperms
- Clade: Magnoliids
- Order: Magnoliales
- Family: Annonaceae
- Genus: Annona
- Species: A. salzmannii

Binomial name
- Annona salzmannii A.DC.

= Annona salzmannii =

Species of tree

Annona salzmannii, the beach sugar apple, is a tree native to Brazil.

Unlike other Annona, it bears orange fruits that weigh up to one pound with a sweet, white pulp. The fruit is prized in its native range, but is rare and never cultivated.

The tree is an evergreen tree to 30–45 feet (9.1–13.7 m), one of the tallest Annona trees. These fruit trees are like A. scleroderma and A. crassiflora.

A. salzmannii is a food source for golden-headed lion tamarins (one of 155 tree species useful to the tamarins).
