= Annona neoecuadorensis =

Conservation status
- Endangered (IUCN 3.1)

Scientific classification
- Kingdom: Plantae
- Clade: Tracheophytes
- Clade: Angiosperms
- Clade: Magnoliids
- Order: Magnoliales
- Family: Annonaceae
- Genus: Annona
- Species: A. neoecuadorensis

Binomial name
- Annona neoecuadorensis (R.E.Fr.) H.Rainer

Synonyms
- Rollinia ecuadorensis R.E.Fr.

Species of flowering plant

Annona neoecuadorensis is a species of flowering plant in the Annonaceae family. It is a tree endemic to eastern Ecuador. It grows up to 10 meters tall and has white or yellow flowers. It is native to the lowland and piedmont Napo moist forests, part of the Amazon Rainforest, in Napo and Orellana provinces from 250 to 500 meters elevation. The species is threatened by habitat loss from agricultural expansion and petroleum mining. The IUCN Red List assesses the species as Endangered.

The species was first described as Rollinia ecuadorensis by Robert Elias Fries in 1939. In 2007 Heimo Rainer merged genus Rollinia into Annona. As there was already a species named Annona ecuadorensis, Rainer renamed the species A. neoecuadorensis.
