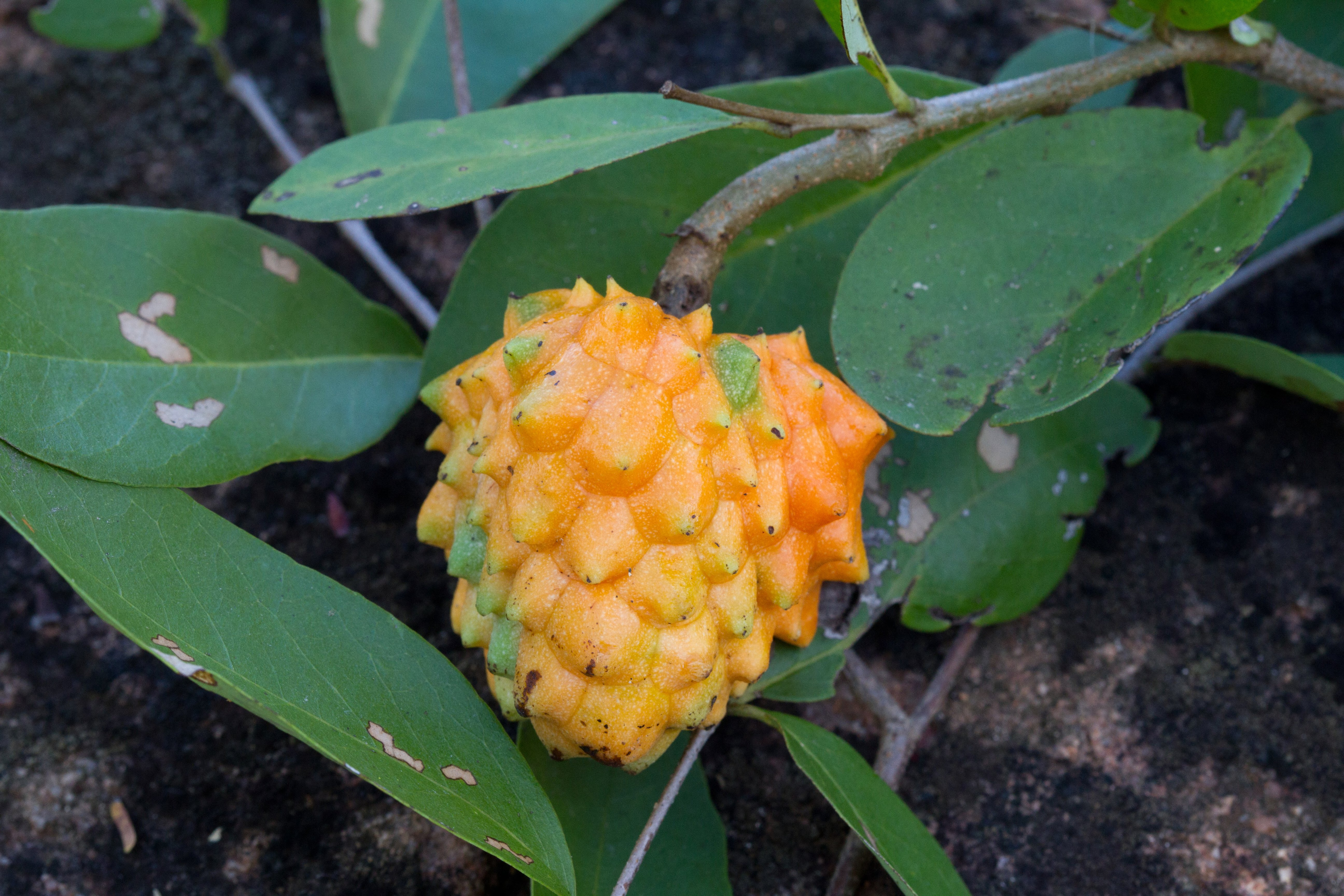
- Photograph of an Annona nutans fruit.

Conservation status
- Least Concern (IUCN 3.1)

Scientific classification
- Kingdom: Plantae
- Clade: Tracheophytes
- Clade: Angiosperms
- Clade: Magnoliids
- Order: Magnoliales
- Family: Annonaceae
- Genus: Annona
- Species: A. nutans

Binomial name
- Annona nutans (R.E.Fr.) R.E.Fr.

Synonyms
- Annona nanofruticosa Herzog; Annona spinescens var. nutans R.E.Fr.

= Annona nutans =

Species of plant

Annona nutans is a species of plant in the family Annonaceae. It is native to northern Argentina, Bolivia, central and southeastern Brazil, and Paraguay. Robert Elias Fries, the Swedish botanist who first formally described the species, named it after its recurved peduncles which give the flowers a nodding (nutans in Latin) appearance.

== Description ==
It is a bush 5 to 6 meters (16 to 20 ft) in height. Its branches have inconspicuous, brown lenticels. Its membranous, oval leaves are 3–5 by 2.5–3.2 centimeters with rounded apex that ends in an abrupt small point. The leaves are hairless on their upper surface and on their lower surface except along the midrib and veins when young. The leaves have 10 secondary veins emanating from each side of the midrib. Its petioles 2 millimeters long and have a groove on their upper side. Its recurved peduncles are 2.5–4 centimeters long, extra-axillary and usually emerge opposite a leaf. The peduncles are solitary or in pairs. The peduncles have a bract, covered in rust colored hairs, at their base and another at their midpoint. Its sepals are united to form a calyx with triangular lobes that come to a point. The outer surface of the calyx is covered in rust-colored silky hairs. Its petals are united to form a corolla, 1.5–2.3 centimeters in diameter, consisting of 3 broad lobes alternating with 3 narrow lobes. The outer surface of the corolla is covered in fine rust-colored hairs. The corolla is yellow to ochre-colored with purple spots on the inside. Its stamen are 1.8–2.2 millimeters long with flat filaments. The connective tissue between the lobes of the anther is extended to form a cap. Its flowers have multiple carpels that form a cone-shaped gynoecium. Its 4-sided, prism-shaped ovaries are 0.9–1 millimeters long. Its fleshy, quadrangular styles are 0.9–1 millimeters long and terminate in ovoid stigmas. The outermost styles are covered in fine glandular hairs. The mature orange fruit are 5 centimeters in diameter and 7 centimeters long.

== Reproductive biology ==
The pollen of Annona nutans is shed as permanent tetrads.

== Distribution and habitat ==
It has been observed growing in fields, sandy plains and valleys.

== Uses ==
It was described as being edible in 1914 by the American botanist William Edwin Safford. The pulp of the wild, fresh fruit has been reported as being used as a food source in Brazil.
