= Annona asplundiana =

Conservation status
- Vulnerable (IUCN 3.1)

Scientific classification
- Kingdom: Plantae
- Clade: Tracheophytes
- Clade: Angiosperms
- Clade: Magnoliids
- Order: Magnoliales
- Family: Annonaceae
- Genus: Annona
- Species: A. asplundiana

Binomial name
- Annona asplundiana R.E.Fr.

Species of tree

Annona asplundiana is a species of plant in the Annonaceae family. It is native to Peru, Ecuador and Brazil. It is considered as a vulnerable species by the IUCN.
