= Anonidium mannii =

Conservation status
- Least Concern (IUCN 3.1)

Scientific classification
- Kingdom: Plantae
- Clade: Embryophytes
- Clade: Tracheophytes
- Clade: Spermatophytes
- Clade: Angiosperms
- Clade: Magnoliids
- Order: Magnoliales
- Family: Annonaceae
- Genus: Anonidium
- Species: A. mannii

Binomial name
- Anonidium mannii (Oliv.) Engl. & Diels

Synonyms
- Annona laurentii Engl. & Diels; Annona mannii Oliv.; Anonidium laurentii (Engl. & Diels) Engl. & Diels; Uva crassipetala (Engl.) Kuntze; Uvaria crassipetala Engl. ex Engl. & Diels

Species of tree

Anonidium mannii, the junglesop, is a fast-growing tropical African tree that grows to 8–30 m high, with a girth of up to 2 m. It has 20–40 cm long leaves and large flowers which produce edible fruits generally around 4–6 kg, but which can be up to around 15 kg. Fruit flavor is rich but variable and is sometimes described as an acquired taste, though the fruits are generally in high demand in Africa, with large fruits commanding high prices. The fruit is a favorite with local people (who refer to it as "bobo") and local primates, especially bonobos.

== Fruit ==
After approximately 10 years, junglesops begin to produce fruit seasonally. Normally around 5 kg, some are up to 15 kg, making the junglesop not only the largest of the Annonaceae but one of the largest fruits in the world, though not as large as the jackfruit or Telfairia pedata. Inside the tough, leathery brown skin patterned with raised diamond-shapes is a soft yellow-orange pulp with a somewhat peachy but unique flavor ranging from sweet to sour depending upon the genetic qualities of the tree concerned and upon its ripeness when harvested. Some fruits do not taste good, but its rich flavor appeals to most palates and it is rich in vitamin A.

== Reproductive biology ==
Its pollen is shed as permanent tetrads.

== Cultivation ==
Recommended cultivation distance is 8 meters square, and planting several trees together is recommended to ensure good pollination. Trees reportedly prefer a rich, acidic and moist but well drained soil. As an understory tree, it is shade tolerant, but susceptible to wind damage. Attempts at cultivation have also been hampered by insect attack and fungal diseases.

Where it occurs naturally, the tree is not generally cultivated, possibly due to the availability of the fruit from wild trees, possibly due to the fact that although fast-growing, trees take so long to bear fruit.

== Distribution ==
The natural range of the junglesop is the rain forests of west-central Africa, from Ghana and southern Nigeria through Cameroon, Central African Republic, Gabon, Republic of the Congo, and Democratic Republic of the Congo. It grows in lowland rainforests, and in fringing forest and adjacent savanna especially next to rivers, provided the soil is well drained.

It has also been planted in Hawaii, Malaysia and Australia, but has not yet set fruit. A single tree is known to be growing in the continental US, in the Miami garden of pomologist Bill Whitman, though it too has never fruited.
