= Annona boliviana =

Conservation status
- Near Threatened (IUCN 3.1)

Scientific classification
- Kingdom: Plantae
- Clade: Tracheophytes
- Clade: Angiosperms
- Clade: Magnoliids
- Order: Magnoliales
- Family: Annonaceae
- Genus: Annona
- Species: A. boliviana

Binomial name
- Annona boliviana (R.E.Fr.) H.Rainer

Synonyms
- Rollinia boliviana R.E.Fr.

Species of flowering plant

Rollinia boliviana is a species of flowering plant in the Annonaceae family. It is a tree endemic to Bolivia. It grows in lowland rain forest and Yungas (montane rain forest) on the eastern slope of the Andes. It is threatened with habitat loss from deforestation for commercial and small-scale agriculture and livestock raising.

The species was first described as Rollinia boliviana by Robert Elias Fries in 1941. In 2007 Heimo Rainer synonymized genus Rollinia with Annona and renamed the species A. boliviana.
