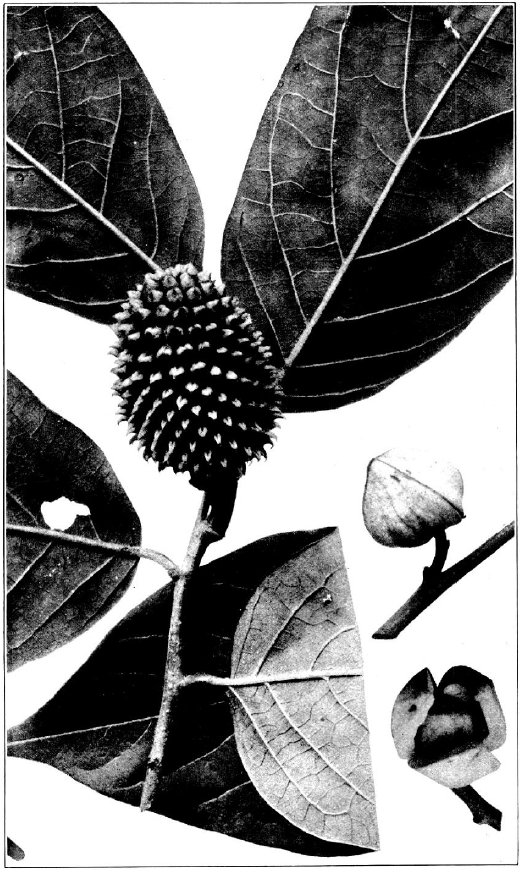
- Photograph of Annona jahnii leaves, flowers and fruit.

Conservation status
- Least Concern (IUCN 3.1)

Scientific classification
- Kingdom: Plantae
- Clade: Tracheophytes
- Clade: Angiosperms
- Clade: Magnoliids
- Order: Magnoliales
- Family: Annonaceae
- Genus: Annona
- Species: A. jahnii

Binomial name
- Annona jahnii Saff.

= Annona jahnii =

Species of plant

Annona jahnii is a species of plant in the family Annonaceae. It is native to the northern Brazil, Colombia, Guyana, Suriname, and Venezuela. William Edwin Safford, the American botanist who first formally described the species, named it after the Venezuelan scientist, explorer and mountain climber Alfredo Jahn.

== Description ==
It is tree reaching 4-6 meters in height. Its membranous, oval to oblong leaves are 12.5-18 by 7-10 centimeters and come to a tapering point at their tips. The mature leaves are hairless on their upper surface, except for the midrib, and have rust-colored hairs on their lower surface. Its leaves have 10-14 pairs of secondary veins emanating from their midribs. Its petioles are 6-8 millimeters, have a groove on their upper surface, and are covered in dense rust-colored hairs. Its flowers are on solitary, extra-axillary peduncles that are 12-15 millimeters long. The peduncles are covered in rust-colored hair and have a bracteole near the middle of their length. It has fused sepals with 3 triangular lobes that come to a long tapering point. It has three thick, oval petals, 20 by 18 millimeters, with margins that touch, but are not fused. The outer surface of the petals is covered in very fine light green hairs. The inner surface of the petals is covered in dense woolly gray hairs. Its inner petals are essentially absent. It has numerous stamens that are 2.5-2.8 millimeters long. The tissue connecting the lobes of the anther forms a brown, velvety cap. Its 2.6-2.8 millimeter long carpels have two styles terminating in long grooved stigmas that are covered in minute hairs. Its ovaries are covered in yellow-white to red hairs. Its oval-shape fruit are 4.5-7 by 3-4 centimeters. The fruit are covered in pyramid-shaped bumps arranged in a spiral pattern and dense rust-colored hairs. The fruit have a groove opposite their attachment point, and terminate in a woody, hooked point. Its immature, smooth, brown seeds are 9-10 by 4-5 millimeters, and have a prominent caruncle at their base. The pulp of the fruit was reported by William Safford, in 1914, to be edible, sweet and pleasantly flavored.

=== Reproductive biology ===
The yellow pollen of Annona jahnii is shed as permanent tetrads.

=== Distribution and habitat ===
It grows in thickly forested areas at the margins of streams.

=== Uses ===
Bioactive compounds extracted from twigs have been reported to inhibit mitochondrial electron transport.
