= Annona fendleri =

Conservation status
- Least Concern (IUCN 3.1)

Scientific classification
- Kingdom: Plantae
- Clade: Tracheophytes
- Clade: Angiosperms
- Clade: Magnoliids
- Order: Magnoliales
- Family: Annonaceae
- Genus: Annona
- Species: A. fendleri

Binomial name
- Annona fendleri (R.E.Fr.) H.Rainer

Synonyms
- Rollinia fendleri R.E.Fr.; Rollinia subracemosa Pittier

Species of flowering plant

Annona fendleri is a species of flowering plant in the Annonaceae family. It is a tree endemic to northwestern Venezuela.

The species was first described as Rollinia fendleri in 1934 by Robert Elias Fries. In 2007 Heimo Rainer synonymized Rollinia with Annona, and renamed the species A. fendleri.
