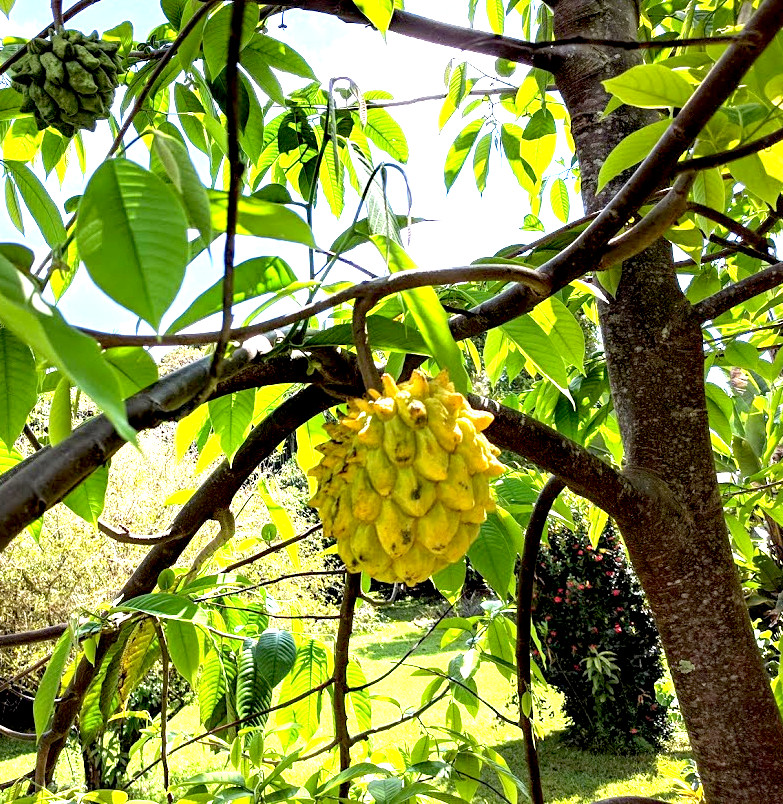

Conservation status
- Least Concern (IUCN 3.1)

Scientific classification
- Kingdom: Plantae
- Clade: Embryophytes
- Clade: Tracheophytes
- Clade: Spermatophytes
- Clade: Angiosperms
- Clade: Magnoliids
- Order: Magnoliales
- Family: Annonaceae
- Genus: Annona
- Species: A. mucosa

Binomial name
- Annona mucosa Jacq. (1764)

Synonyms
- Synonyms list: Annona biflora Sessé & Moc. (1894); Annona muscosa Aubl. (1775); Annona obtusiflora Tussac (1813); Annona obtusifolia DC. (1824); Annona parviflora Ruiz & Pav. (1959), no type indicated.; Annona pteropetala Ruiz & Pav. ex R.E.Fr. (1934); Annona reticulata Sieber ex A.DC. (1832), nom. illeg.; Annona reticulata var. mucosa (Jacq.) Willd. (1799); Annona squamosa Vell. (1829), nom. illeg.; Rollinia biflora G.Don (1831); Rollinia curvipetala R.E.Fr. (1934); Rollinia deliciosa Saff. (1916); Rollinia jimenezii Saff. (1916); Rollinia jimenezii var. nelsonii R.E.Fr. (1948); Rollinia micrantha G.Don (1831); Rollinia mucosa (Jacq.) Baill. (1868); Rollinia mucosa subsp. aequatorialis R.E.Fr. (1934); Rollinia mucosa var. macropoda R.E.Fr. (1934); Rollinia mucosa var. neglecta (R.E.Fr.) R.E.Fr. (1938); Rollinia mucosa subsp. portoricensis R.E.Fr. (1934); Rollinia neglecta R.E.Fr. (1934); Rollinia orthopetala A. DC. (1832); Rollinia permensis Standl. (1929); Rollinia pterocarpa G.Don (1831); Rollinia pulchrinervia A.DC. (1832); Rollinia sieberi A.DC. (1832); Rolliniopsis parviflora var. angustifolia R.E.Fr. (1934)

= Annona mucosa =

Biribá

Species of tropical fruit plant

Annona mucosa is a species of flowering plant in the custard-apple family, Annonaceae, that is native to tropical South America. It is cultivated for its edible fruits, commonly known as biribá, lemon meringue pie fruit, wild sugar-apple, or rollinia throughout the world's tropics and subtropics.

== Common names ==
The Brazilian name, biribá, has become somewhat well known. Nonetheless, the fruits are occasionally known by other names, including wild sugar apple and aratiku.

== Description ==
Biribá is a fast-growing, flood-tolerant, sun-loving tropical tree, with leaves up to 35 cm (14 in) long. It can reach a height of 4–15 m (13–49 ft), which can bear fruit from seed within 3 years. The fruit is large, conical or round, green when unripe, ripening to yellow. Its surface is covered with soft spines or protuberances which bruise and blacken with handling. This delicacy, together with a shelf life of less than a week, has limited its commercial cultivation. However, it is an increasingly popular tree for homestead cultivation in tropical areas.

The fruit pulp is very soft and sweet, tasting somewhat like a lemon meringue pie. Some reports of the flavor are extremely favorable, others more moderate. It is generally eaten out of the hand, though some chefs have used it for cooking, and wine has been made out of it in Brazil.

== Cultivars ==
Propagation is usually by seeds, which can remain viable for 2 years kept dry and in the dark, though air-layering and grafting are possible to preserve specific cultivars. Grafting onto rootstocks of Annona montana or Annona glabra causes dwarfing. Little work establishing superior cultivars has been done and considerable genetic variability exists. 'Regnard' is perhaps the best-known cultivar, which was introduced into the Philippines in 1917. The largest is 'biribá do Alto Solimoes', developed in Brazil, which can weigh up to 4 kg (9 lb), making it probably the third largest fruit of the Annona family after the junglesop and the soursop.

== Other uses ==
The wood of the biribá tree is durable and suitable for boat construction.
