= Annona dolichopetala =

Conservation status
- Least Concern (IUCN 3.1)

Scientific classification
- Kingdom: Plantae
- Clade: Tracheophytes
- Clade: Angiosperms
- Clade: Magnoliids
- Order: Magnoliales
- Family: Annonaceae
- Genus: Annona
- Species: A. dolichopetala

Binomial name
- Annona dolichopetala (R.E.Fr.) H.Rainer

Synonyms
- Rollinia dolichopetala R.E.Fr.; Rollinia dolichopetala var. divergens R.E.Fr.; Rollinia dolichopetala var. suberecta R.E.Fr.

Species of flowering plant

Annona dolichopetala is a species of flowering plant in the Annonaceae family. It is a tree endemic to Ecuador. It grows east of the Andes in lowland and montane Amazonian rainforest from 250 to 2,100 meters elevation.
