= Annona calcarata =

Conservation status
- Vulnerable (IUCN 3.1)

Scientific classification
- Kingdom: Plantae
- Clade: Tracheophytes
- Clade: Angiosperms
- Clade: Magnoliids
- Order: Magnoliales
- Family: Annonaceae
- Genus: Annona
- Species: A. calcarata

Binomial name
- Annona calcarata (R.E.Fr.) H.Rainer

Synonyms
- Rollinia calcarata R.E.Fr.

Species of flowering plant

Annona calcarata is a species of flowering plant in the Annonaceae family. It is a tree endemic to northern Brazil. It is native to inundated forest (Igapó) and terre firme rain forest, where it grows up to 30 meters tall. The IUCN Red List assesses the species as Vulnerable.

The species was first described as Rollinia calcarata by Robert Elias Fries in 1937. In 2007 Heimo Rainer merged the genus Rollinia into Annona and renamed the species A. calcarata.
