= Annona neoamazonica =

Conservation status
- Data Deficient (IUCN 3.1)

Scientific classification
- Kingdom: Plantae
- Clade: Tracheophytes
- Clade: Angiosperms
- Clade: Magnoliids
- Order: Magnoliales
- Family: Annonaceae
- Genus: Annona
- Species: A. neoamazonica

Binomial name
- Annona neoamazonica H.Rainer (2007)

Synonyms
- Rollinia amazonica R.E.Fr. (1957)

Species of flowering plant

Annona neoamazonica is a species of flowering plant in the Annonaceae family. It is a tree endemic to southeastern Colombia.
