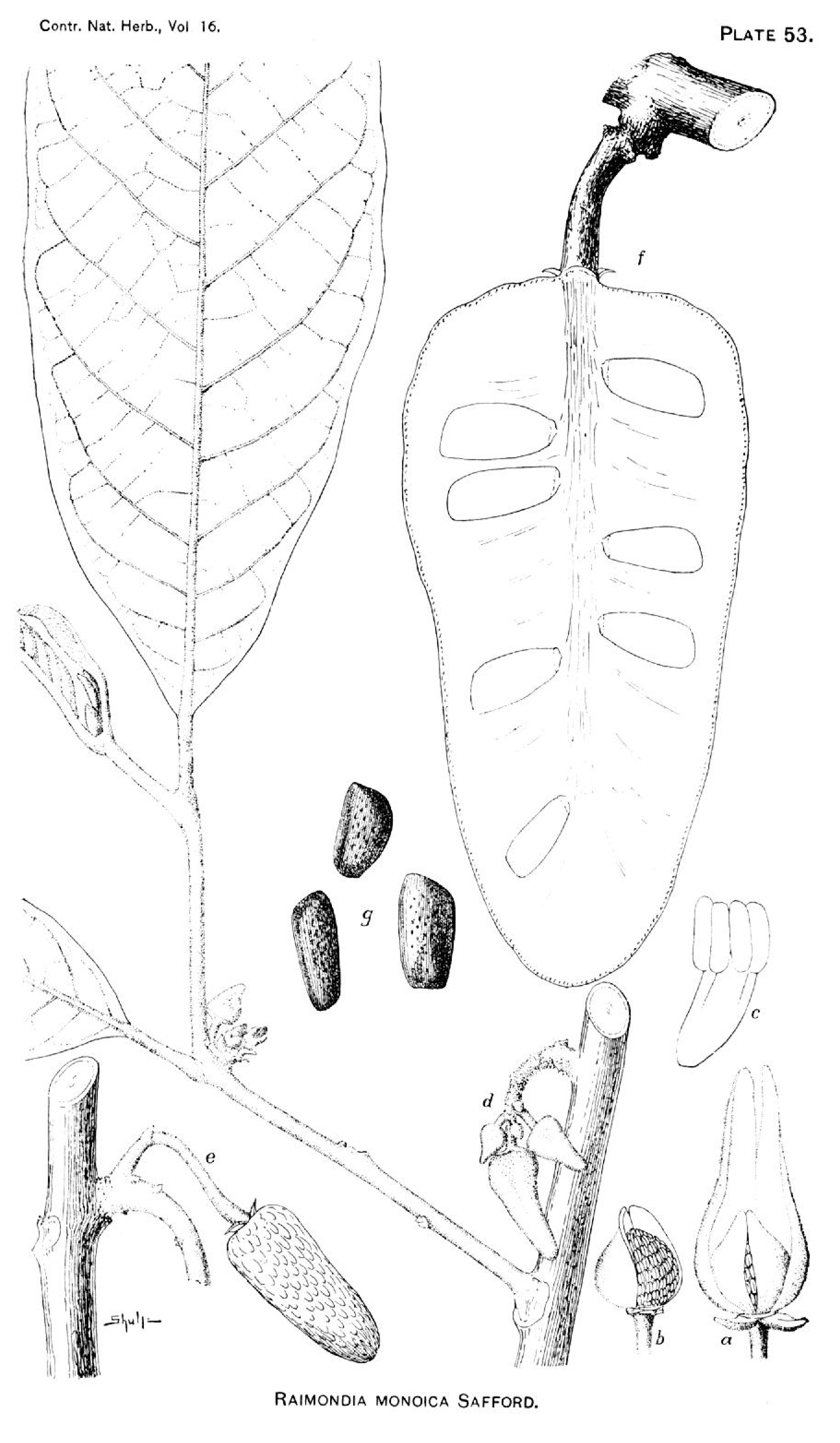
- Scientific illustration of Annona cherimolioides (using synonym Raimondia monoica)

Conservation status
- Least Concern (IUCN 3.1)

Scientific classification
- Kingdom: Plantae
- Clade: Tracheophytes
- Clade: Angiosperms
- Clade: Magnoliids
- Order: Magnoliales
- Family: Annonaceae
- Genus: Annona
- Species: A. cherimolioides

Binomial name
- Annona cherimolioides Triana & Planch.

Synonyms
- Annona cherimolioides var. amplifolia Triana & Planch. Raimondia cherimolioides (Triana & Planch.) R.E.Fr. Raimondia monoica Saff.

= Annona cherimolioides =

Species of flowering plant

Annona cherimolioides is a species of plant in the Annonaceae family. It is native to Colombia and Ecuador. José Jerónimo Triana and Jules Émile Planchon, the botanists who first formally described the species, named it after its resemblance to another Annona species A. cherimoya.

== Description ==
It is a small tree. The young, grey-brown branches are densely covered with rust-colored, short, woolly hairs, but become hairless at maturity. Its egg-shaped to lance-shaped, membranous leaves are 13–23 by 5–12.5 centimeters. The leaves have pointed to rounded bases and tapering tips. The young leaves are densely covered with rust-colored, short, wooly hairs on both sides, but become sparsely hairy with maturity. The leaves have wavy margins. Its petioles are densely hairy when young and become sparsely hairy when mature. The petioles are 10–15 millimeters long with a groove on their upper side. Its Inflorescences consist of clusters of flowers, and are organized on densely hairy peduncles that are 5-15 millimeters. The peduncles have a medial and basal bract. Its flowers are unisexual with female flowers occurring at the base of inflorescences and male flowers occurring higher up. Its flowers have 3 triangular sepals, that are 4 millimeters long. Its 6 petals are arranged in two rows of 3. The lance-shaped, outer petals are 15–20 by 7–8 millimeters rounded tips. The outer petals have margins that touch and silky hairs on their outer surface. The triangular, concave inner petals 7–8 by 6–7 millimeters. The inner petals have rounded tips that form a cone over the flowers reproductive organs. The receptacles are rounded to cone-shaped in male flowers and linearly elongated in female flowers. The male flowers have numerous stamens. Female flowers have numerous carpels, each with 1 ovule. The compound fruit occur on peduncles that are 2-2.5 millimeters long. The hairless, thin-skinned, fruit are 10 by 5 centimeters. The light brown, flattened, oblong to egg-shaped seeds have truncated tips and sharp edges. The surfaces of the seeds are hairless with shallow pits.

=== Reproductive biology ===
The pollen of Annona cherimolioides is shed as permanent tetrads.

=== Distribution and habitat ===
It has been observed growing at altitudes of up to 2600 meters.
