= Annona herzogii =

Conservation status
- Least Concern (IUCN 3.1)

Scientific classification
- Kingdom: Plantae
- Clade: Tracheophytes
- Clade: Angiosperms
- Clade: Magnoliids
- Order: Magnoliales
- Family: Annonaceae
- Genus: Annona
- Species: A. herzogii

Binomial name
- Annona herzogii (R.E.Fr.) H.Rainer

Synonyms
- Rollinia herzogii R.E.Fr.

Species of plant

Annona herzogii is a species of flowering plant in the Annonaceae family. It is a tree native to Bolivia and Peru. It grows in forest and savanna in the Amazon Basin east of the Andes.

The species was first described as Rollinia herzogii by Robert Elias Fries in 1934. In 2007 Heimo Rainer synonymized genus Rollinia with Annona, and renamed the species A. herzogii.
