= Annona ferruginea =

Conservation status
- Critically Endangered (IUCN 3.1)

Scientific classification
- Kingdom: Plantae
- Clade: Tracheophytes
- Clade: Angiosperms
- Clade: Magnoliids
- Order: Magnoliales
- Family: Annonaceae
- Genus: Annona
- Species: A. ferruginea

Binomial name
- Annona ferruginea (R.E.Fr.) H.Rainer

Synonyms
- Rollinia ferruginea (R.E.Fr.) Maas & Westra; Rolliniopsis ferruginea R.E.Fr.

Species of flowering plant

Annona ferruginea is a species of flowering plant in the Annonaceae family. It is a tree which grows to a maximum of 2 m (6 ft) tall. It is endemic to the Atlantic Forest of Brazil, where it is known from a single location in Tijuca National Park within the city of Rio de Janeiro, where it grows in coastal rain forest at 700 meters elevation. The tree is threatened by air pollution, and the IUCN Red List assesses the species as Critically Endangered.

The species was first described as Rollinia ferruginea by Robert Elias Fries in 1934. In 2007 Heimo Rainer merged the genus Rollinia into Annona and renamed the species A. ferruginea.
