= Annona ecuadorensis =

Conservation status
- Critically Endangered (IUCN 3.1)

Scientific classification
- Kingdom: Plantae
- Clade: Tracheophytes
- Clade: Angiosperms
- Clade: Magnoliids
- Order: Magnoliales
- Family: Annonaceae
- Genus: Annona
- Species: A. ecuadorensis

Binomial name
- Annona ecuadorensis R.E.Fr.

Species of flowering plant

Annona ecuadorensis is a species of plant in the Annonaceae family. It is endemic to Ecuador. Its natural habitat is subtropical or tropical moist lowland forests. It is threatened by habitat loss.
