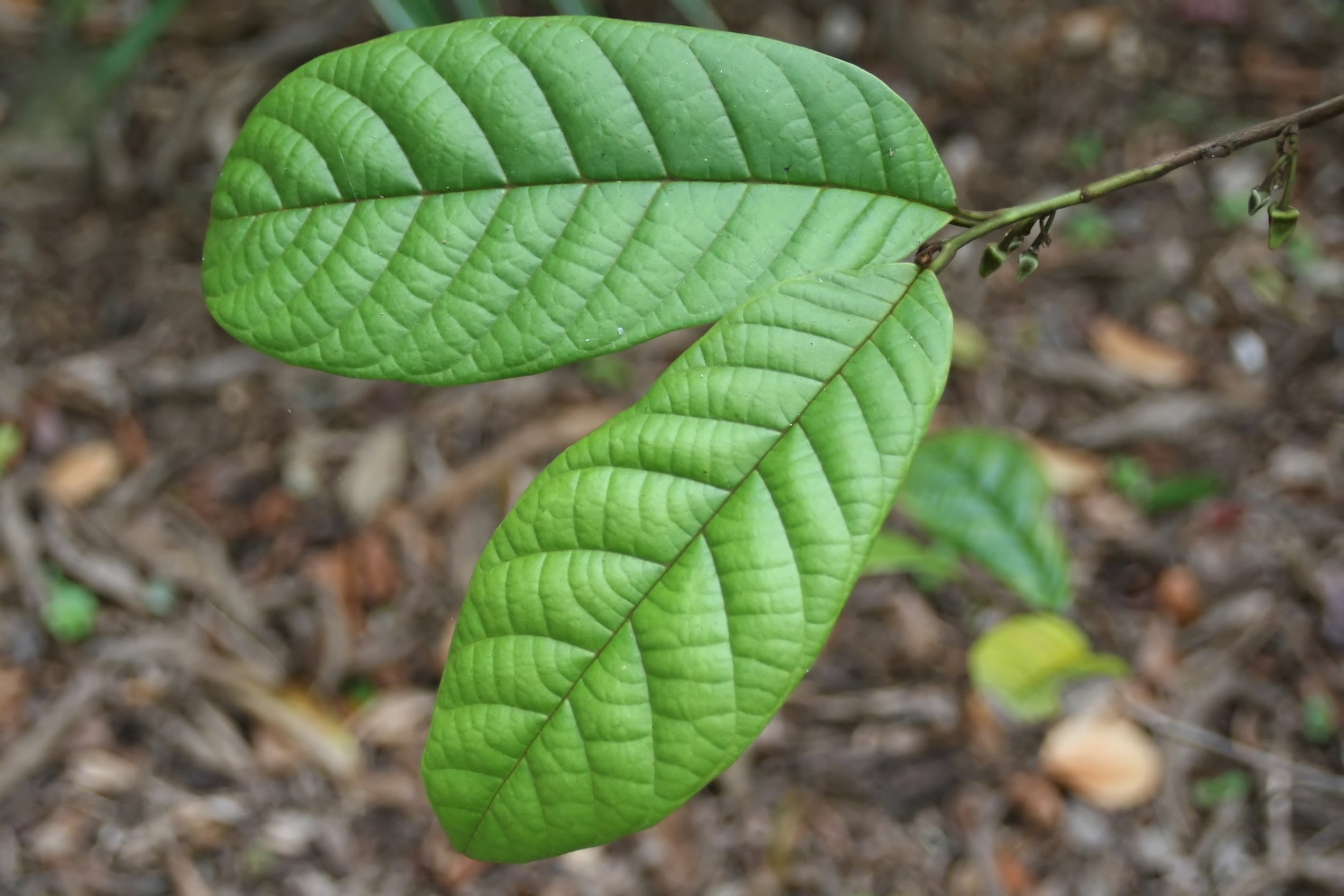
- Photograph of the leaves of Annona quinduensis.

Conservation status
- Least Concern (IUCN 3.1)

Scientific classification
- Kingdom: Plantae
- Clade: Tracheophytes
- Clade: Angiosperms
- Clade: Magnoliids
- Order: Magnoliales
- Family: Annonaceae
- Genus: Annona
- Species: A. quinduensis

Binomial name
- Annona quinduensis Kunth

Synonyms
- Raimondia quinduensis Kunth) Saff.

= Annona quinduensis =

Species of flowering plant

Annona quinduensis is a species of plant in the Annonaceae family. It is native to Colombia and Ecuador. Carl Sigismund Kunth, the botanists who first formally described the species, named it after Quindío, a department of Colombia, where the specimen he examined was collected.

== Description ==
It is a tree. The young, wrinkled branches are densely covered with soft hairs, but become hairless at maturity. Its oblong to lance-shaped, membranous to slightly leathery leaves are 10–22 by 2–6.6 centimeters. The leaves have pointed bases and tips. The leaves are hairless on their upper surface and can have some small hairs on their underside. The leaves have small translucent spots. The leaves have 8–11 pairs of secondary veins emanating from their midribs. Its slightly hairy petioles are 6–10 millimeters long with a groove on their upper side. Its Inflorescences consist 1–5 flowers, and occur outside the axils or in subterminal positions. The inflorescences are organized on branchlets that occur in groups of 1–3. The branchlets have small, rough bracts that clamp the stem in two opposing rows with the bracts in each row overlapping one another like shingles. The bracts are covered in rust-colored hairs. Each flower is on a thin pedicel that is 8–12 millimeters long. The pedicels are covered in rust-colored hairs and have medial and basal bracts. The bracts are oval to lance-shaped and covered in rust-colored hairs. Its flowers are unisexual. Its 6 petals are arranged in two rows of 3. The oval to lance-shaped to linear, outer petals are 8–22 millimeters. The outer petals have rust-colored silky hairs on their outer surface. The oval inner petals 3–4 millimeters long. The inner petals have pointed tips that form a cone over the reproductive organs of the male flowers. The receptacles are rounded to cone-shaped in male flowers and linearly elongated in female flowers. The male flowers have numerous stamens that are 0.6–0.7 millimeters long. The filament and anther are about equal in length. The connective tissue between the lobes of the anther have a few small terminal hairs. The surface of the fruit have a fain network-like pattern and have 20–25 seeds. The seeds are oval to triangular in cross-section, brown-green and 8 millimeters long.

=== Reproductive biology ===
The pollen of Annona quinduensis is shed as permanent tetrads.

=== Distribution and habitat ===
It has been observed growing at altitudes of up to 2000 meters.
