= Annona centrantha =

Conservation status
- Least Concern (IUCN 3.1)

Scientific classification
- Kingdom: Plantae
- Clade: Tracheophytes
- Clade: Angiosperms
- Clade: Magnoliids
- Order: Magnoliales
- Family: Annonaceae
- Genus: Annona
- Species: A. centrantha

Binomial name
- Annona centrantha (R.E.Fr.) H.Rainer

Synonyms
- Rollinia centrantha R.E.Fr.

Species of flowering plant

Annona centrantha is a species of flowering plant in the Annonaceae family. It is a tree native to Ecuador, Peru, and northwestern Brazil, where it grows in lowland Amazon rain forest.

The species was first described by Robert Elias Fries in 1934. In 2007 Heimo Rainer merged the genus Rollinia into Annona, and renamed the species A. centrantha.
