= Annona xylopiifolia =

Conservation status
- Vulnerable (IUCN 3.1)

Scientific classification
- Kingdom: Plantae
- Clade: Tracheophytes
- Clade: Angiosperms
- Clade: Magnoliids
- Order: Magnoliales
- Family: Annonaceae
- Genus: Annona
- Species: A. xylopiifolia

Binomial name
- Annona xylopiifolia A.St.-Hil. & Tul.

Synonyms
- Rollinia lanceolata R.E.Fr.; Rollinia warmingii R.E.Fr.; Rollinia xylopiifolia (A.St.-Hil. & Tul.) R.E.Fr.; Rollinia xylopiifolia var. lanceolata R.E.Fr.

Species of flowering plant

Annona xylopiifolia is a species of flowering plant in the Annonaceae family. It is a shrub or small tree up to 2 meters tall, which is endemic to the Espírito Santo, Rio de Janeiro, and São Paulo states of southeastern Brazil. It grows in moist lowland Atlantic Forest.

The species was first described by Augustin Saint-Hilaire and Edmond Tulasne in 1842.
