= Annona bahiensis =

Conservation status
- Least Concern (IUCN 3.1)

Scientific classification
- Kingdom: Plantae
- Clade: Tracheophytes
- Clade: Angiosperms
- Clade: Magnoliids
- Order: Magnoliales
- Family: Annonaceae
- Genus: Annona
- Species: A. bahiensis

Binomial name
- Annona bahiensis (Maas & Westra) H.Rainer

Synonyms
- Rollinia bahiensis Maas & Westra

Species of flowering plant

Annona bahiensis is a species of flowering plant in the Annonaceae family. It is a tree native to Bahia and Minas Gerais states in eastern Brazil. It grows in the Atlantic Forest, and is threatened by habitat loss.
