= Annona hispida =

Conservation status
- Vulnerable (IUCN 3.1)

Scientific classification
- Kingdom: Plantae
- Clade: Tracheophytes
- Clade: Angiosperms
- Clade: Magnoliids
- Order: Magnoliales
- Family: Annonaceae
- Genus: Annona
- Species: A. hispida

Binomial name
- Annona hispida (Maas & Westra) H.Rainer

Synonyms
- Rollinia hispida Maas & Westra

Species of tree

Annona hispida is a species of tree in the Annonaceae family. It is a tree native to Ecuador, Peru, and northwestern Brazil. It grows in lowland Amazonian rainforest.

The species was first described as Rollinia hispida by Maas and Westra in 1989. In 2007 Heimo Rainer merged the genus Rollinia into Annona and renamed the species A. hispida.
