= Annona andicola =

Conservation status
- Least Concern (IUCN 3.1)

Scientific classification
- Kingdom: Plantae
- Clade: Tracheophytes
- Clade: Angiosperms
- Clade: Magnoliids
- Order: Magnoliales
- Family: Annonaceae
- Genus: Annona
- Species: A. andicola

Binomial name
- Annona andicola (Maas & Westra) H.Rainer

Synonyms
- Rollinia andicola Maas & Westra

Species of tree

Rollinia andicola is a species of flowering plant in the Annonaceae family. It is a tree native to Ecuador and Peru. It grows in montane rain forest on the eastern (Amazonian) slope of the Andes from 1,200 to 1,900 meters elevation.
