= Annona parviflora =

Conservation status
- Endangered (IUCN 3.1)

Scientific classification
- Kingdom: Plantae
- Clade: Embryophytes
- Clade: Tracheophytes
- Clade: Spermatophytes
- Clade: Angiosperms
- Clade: Magnoliids
- Order: Magnoliales
- Family: Annonaceae
- Genus: Annona
- Species: A. parviflora

Binomial name
- Annona parviflora (A.St.-Hil.) H.Rainer

Synonyms
- Guatteria apodocarpa Mart.; Rollinia parviflora A.St.-Hil.; Rollinia parviflora var. angustifolia Mart.; Rollinia parviflora var. latifolia Mart.; Rolliniopsis parviflora (A.St.-Hil.) Saff.; Rolliniopsis parviflora var. latifolia (Mart.) R.E.Fr.

Species of flowering plant

Annona parviflora is a species of flowering plant in the Annonaceae family. It is a shrub or tree endemic to Rio de Janeiro state in southeastern Brazil.

The species was first described as Rollinia parviflora by Augustin Saint-Hilaire in 1825. In 2007 Heimo Rainer merged the genus Rollinia into Annona, and renamed the species A. parviflora.
