= Annona neochrysocarpa =

Conservation status
- Vulnerable (IUCN 3.1)

Scientific classification
- Kingdom: Plantae
- Clade: Tracheophytes
- Clade: Angiosperms
- Clade: Magnoliids
- Order: Magnoliales
- Family: Annonaceae
- Genus: Annona
- Species: A. neochrysocarpa

Binomial name
- Annona neochrysocarpa H.Rainer

Synonyms
- Rollinia chrysocarpa Maas & Westra

Species of tree

Annona neochrysocarpa is a species of flowering plant in the Annonaceae family. It is a tree native to Ecuador, Peru, and northwestern Brazil, where it grows in lowland Amazon rain forest.

The species was first described as Rollinia chrysocarpa by Maas and Westra in 1989. In 2007 Heimo Rainer merged the genus Rollinia into Annona. Since there was already a species named Annona chrysocarpa Lepr. ex Guill. & Perr. (now a synonym of Annona glabra), Rainer renamed the species Annona neochrysocarpa.
