= Annona dolabripetala =

Conservation status
- Least Concern (IUCN 3.1)

Scientific classification
- Kingdom: Plantae
- Clade: Tracheophytes
- Clade: Angiosperms
- Clade: Magnoliids
- Order: Magnoliales
- Family: Annonaceae
- Genus: Annona
- Species: A. dolabripetala

Binomial name
- Annona dolabripetala Raddi

Synonyms
- Annona neolaurifolia H.Rainer; Annona ubatubensis (Maas & Westra) H.Rainer; Annona xestropetala Spreng.; Rollinia dolabripetala (Raddi) G.Don; Rollinia laurifolia Schltdl.; Rollinia laurifolia var. divergens R.E.Fr.; Rollinia laurifolia var. erecta R.E.Fr.; Rollinia laurifolia var. longipes R.E.Fr.; Rollinia laurifolia f. longipes (R.E.Fr.) R.E.Fr.; Rollinia laurifolia var. reflexa R.E.Fr.; Rollinia longifolia A.St.-Hil.; Rollinia minensis R.E.Fr.; Rollinia ubatubensis Maas & Westra

Species of flowering plant

Annona dolabripetala, commonly known as araticum, is a species of flowering plant in the Annonaceae family. It is a tree endemic to eastern, southern, and west-central Brazil, which grows up to 25 meters tall. It grows in Atlantic rain forest, Atlantic semi-deciduous seasonally-dry forest, and Cerrado savannas.

The species was first described by Giuseppe Raddi in 1820.
