= Annona emarginata =

Conservation status
- Least Concern (IUCN 3.1)

Scientific classification
- Kingdom: Plantae
- Clade: Tracheophytes
- Clade: Angiosperms
- Clade: Magnoliids
- Order: Magnoliales
- Family: Annonaceae
- Genus: Annona
- Species: A. emarginata

Binomial name
- Annona emarginata (Schltdl.) H.Rainer

Synonyms
- Rollinia emarginata Schltdl.; Rollinia emarginata var. longipetala (R.E.Fr.) R.E.Fr.; Rollinia glaucescens Sond.; Rollinia glaziovii R.E.Fr.; Rollinia hassleriana R.E.Fr.; Rollinia hassleriana var. vestita R.E.Fr.; Rollinia intermedia R.E.Fr.; Rollinia longifolia var. paraguariensis Chodat; Rollinia longipetala R.E.Fr.; Rollinia occidentalis R.E.Fr.; Rollinia odoriflora Rojas; Rollinia rugulosa subsp. australis R.E.Fr.; Rollinia sonderiana Walp.; Rollinia viridis Bertoni

Species of flowering plant

Annona emarginata is a species of plant in the Annonaceae family. It is a tree native to South America, ranging from northeastern Brazil and Peru through central and southern Brazil, Bolivia, Paraguay, and Uruguay to northern Argentina, where it grows in lowland tropical and subtropical moist forest.

The species was first described as Rollinia emarginata by Diederich Franz Leonhard von Schlechtendal in 1834. The species has many synonyms. In 2007 Heimo Rainer merged genus Rollinia with Annona, and renamed the species A. emarginata.
