= Annona pachyantha =

Conservation status
- Vulnerable (IUCN 3.1)

Scientific classification
- Kingdom: Plantae
- Clade: Tracheophytes
- Clade: Angiosperms
- Clade: Magnoliids
- Order: Magnoliales
- Family: Annonaceae
- Genus: Annona
- Species: A. pachyantha

Binomial name
- Annona pachyantha (Maas & Westra) H.Rainer

Synonyms
- Rollinia pachyantha Maas & Westra

Species of flowering plant

Annona pachyantha is a species of flowering plant in the Annonaceae family. It is a tree endemic to Colombia. It has a limited range in Valle del Cauca and Chocó departments on Colombia's Pacific coast, where it grows in lowland Chocó–Darién rain forest up to 100 meters elevation.

The species was first described as Rollinia pachyantha by Maas and Westra in 1989. In 2007 Heimo Rainer merged genus Rollinia into Annona and renamed the species A. pachyantha.
