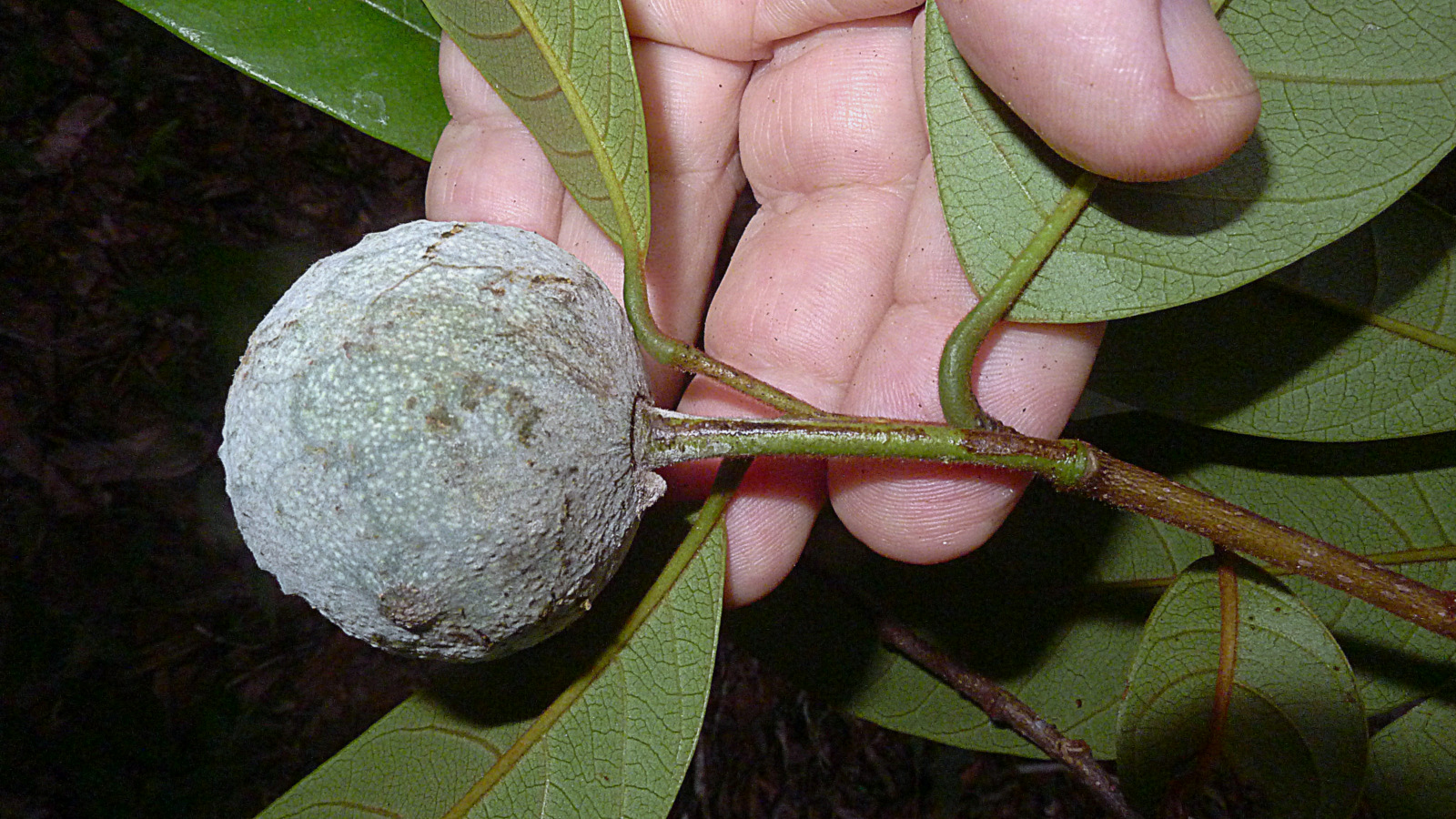
- Fruit
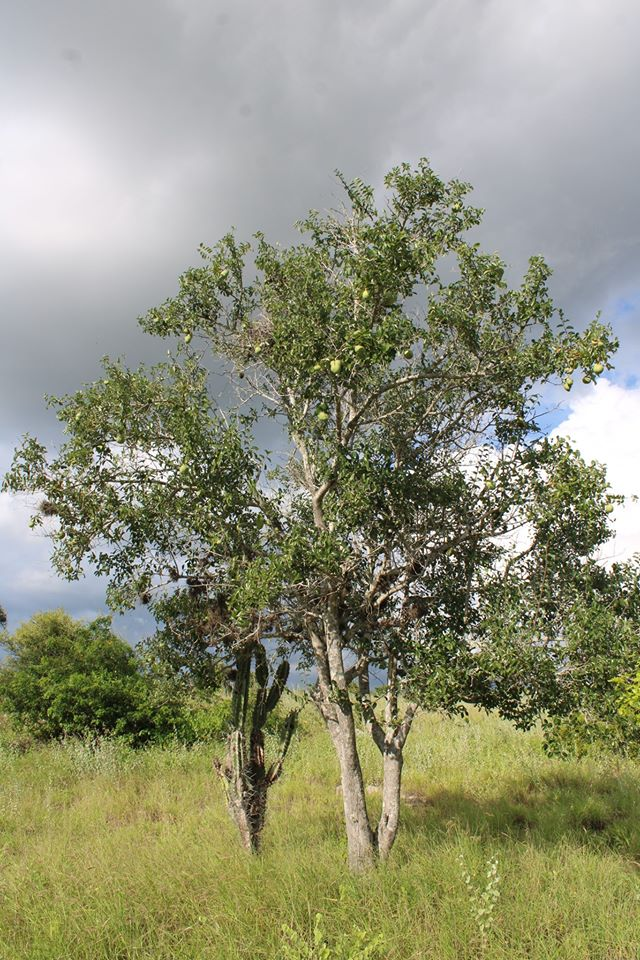
- Habit

Conservation status
- Least Concern (IUCN 3.1)

Scientific classification
- Kingdom: Plantae
- Clade: Tracheophytes
- Clade: Angiosperms
- Clade: Magnoliids
- Order: Magnoliales
- Family: Annonaceae
- Genus: Annona
- Species: A. sylvatica

Binomial name
- Annona sylvatica A.St.-Hil.

Synonyms
- List: Annona exalbida Vell.; Annona fagifolia A.St.-Hil. & Tul.; Annona silvestris Vell.; Rollinia exalbida (Vell.) Mart.; Rollinia fagifolia A.St.-Hil.; Rollinia sylvatica (A.St.-Hil.) Mart.

= Annona sylvatica =

Species of plant in the soursop family

Annona sylvatica (syn. Rollinia sylvatica) is a species of flowering plant in the family Annonaceae, native to Brazil. Its plentiful fruit is edible and is regularly gathered in the wild by locals, and it is occasionally cultivated. It is considered a good species to use for reforestry projects, as it is very fast growing when young.
