= Annona helosioides =

Conservation status
- Least Concern (IUCN 3.1)

Scientific classification
- Kingdom: Plantae
- Clade: Tracheophytes
- Clade: Angiosperms
- Clade: Magnoliids
- Order: Magnoliales
- Family: Annonaceae
- Genus: Annona
- Species: A. helosioides

Binomial name
- Annona helosioides (Maas & Westra) H.Rainer

Synonyms
- Rollinia helosioides Maas & Westra

Species of flowering plant

Annona helosioides is a species of flowering plant in the Annonaceae family. It is a small tree endemic to eastern Ecuador. It is native to the Napo River basin in the western Amazon Basin, where it grows in lowland rain forest.

The species was first described as Rollinia helosioides by Maas and Westra in 1989. In 2007 Heimo Rainer merged the genus Rollinia into Annona, and renamed the species A. helosioides.
