= Annona rufinervis =

Conservation status
- Endangered (IUCN 3.1)

Scientific classification
- Kingdom: Plantae
- Clade: Tracheophytes
- Clade: Angiosperms
- Clade: Magnoliids
- Order: Magnoliales
- Family: Annonaceae
- Genus: Annona
- Species: A. rufinervis

Binomial name
- Annona rufinervis (Triana & Planch.) H.Rainer

Synonyms
- Rollinia rufinervis Triana & Planch.

Species of flowering plant

Annona rufinervis, commonly known as guanabana de monte, is a species of flowering plant in the Annonaceae family. It is a tree endemic to Colombia. It grows in lowland and lower montane rain forests in the Andean valleys, particularly the Magdalena River valley, from 500 to 1,300 meters elevation.

The species was first described as Rollinia rufinervis José Jerónimo Triana and Jules Émile Planchon in 1862. In 2007 Heimo Rainer merged genus Rollinia into Annona and renamed the species A. rufinervis.
