= Annona scleroderma =

Scientific classification
- Kingdom: Plantae
- Clade: Tracheophytes
- Clade: Angiosperms
- Clade: Magnoliids
- Order: Magnoliales
- Family: Annonaceae
- Genus: Annona
- Species: A. scleroderma

Binomial name
- Annona scleroderma Lam.

Synonyms
- Annona liebmanniana

Species of tree

Annona scleroderma (also known as cawesh or poshe-te) is a species of tree in the Annonaceae family, with an edible fruit the size of an orange. The cream-colored flesh of the fruit has a creamy banana-pineapple flavor and a soft texture. The fruit's tough skin makes it easy to handle. The fruit is little known outside its native region. The tree reaches 15 to 20 meters tall. Its pollen is shed as permanent tetrads.

Its native range is the Atlantic coast of Central America, from Mexico and Guatemala to Honduras. It is not widely cultivated (except in certain parts of Guatemala). A tree grown from seed takes about four years until it begins producing fruit.
