= Annona pickelii =

Conservation status
- Near Threatened (IUCN 3.1)

Scientific classification
- Kingdom: Plantae
- Clade: Tracheophytes
- Clade: Angiosperms
- Clade: Magnoliids
- Order: Magnoliales
- Family: Annonaceae
- Genus: Annona
- Species: A. pickelii

Binomial name
- Annona pickelii (Diels) H.Rainer

Synonyms
- Rollinia pickelii Diels

Species of flowering plant

Annona pickelii is a species of flowering plant in the Annonaceae family. It is a tree endemic to Alagoas, Bahia, Piauí, Sergipe, and Pernambuco states of northeastern Brazil. It grows in lowland Atlantic rain forest and restinga (coastal forests on sand).

The species was first described as Rollinia pickelii by Ludwig Diels in 1933. In 2007 Heimo Rainer merged the genus Rollina into Annona and renamed the species A. pickelii.
