= Annona neovelutina =

Conservation status
- Data Deficient (IUCN 3.1)

Scientific classification
- Kingdom: Plantae
- Clade: Tracheophytes
- Clade: Angiosperms
- Clade: Magnoliids
- Order: Magnoliales
- Family: Annonaceae
- Genus: Annona
- Species: A. neovelutina

Binomial name
- Annona neovelutina H.Rainer

Synonyms
- Rollinia velutina Marle

Species of flowering plant

Annona neovelutina is a species of flowering plant in the Annonaceae family. It is a tree native to Colombia and northwestern Venezuela.

The species was first described as Rollinia velutina by E. J. van Marle in 1989. In 2007 Heimo Rainer merged genus Rollinia into Annona. Since there was already a species named Annona velutina A.St.-Hil. & Tul. (now a synonym of Annona crotonifolia), Rainer named the species A. neovelutina.
