= Robert Elias Fries =

Swedish biologist (1876–1966)

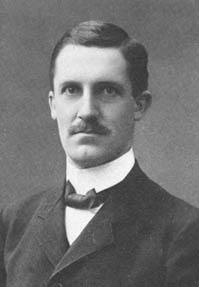
Robert Elias Fries

(Klas) Robert Elias Fries (11 July 1876, Uppsala – 29 January 1966, Stockholm), the youngest son of Theodor Magnus Fries (1832–1913) and grandson of Elias Magnus Fries (1794–1878) and an expert on mushrooms. A Swedish botanist who was a member of the British Mycological Society and involved with The Botanical Museum (UPS), Botanic Garden and Botanical Museum Berlin-Dahlem, Natural History Museum (BM), the National Botanic Garden of Belgium (BR), Conservatoire et Jardin botaniques de la Ville de Genève (G), Royal Botanic Gardens, Kew (K), the Swedish Museum of Natural History Department of Phanerogamic Botany (S) and the United States National Herbarium, Smithsonian Institution (US).

A collector of plants from 1901 through 1923 in Europe: Sweden; Tropical Africa: Kenya; Tropical South America: Bolivia; Temperate South America: Argentina. He sometimes worked with his father and his brother Thore Christian Elias Fries (1886–1931).

He was part of the Swedish 1901–1902 expedition to Argentina and Bolivia, crossing the desert of Chaco, and the Andes.

In 1916, Fries married Nanna Curman, daughter of professor Carl Curman and Calla Curman; their son Sigurd Fries was a linguist.

Professor Bergianus at the Bergius Foundation in Stockholm and head of its garden, Bergianska trädgården. He published works on mycology, plant geography, and systematics. This botanist is denoted by the author abbreviation R.E.Fr. when citing a botanical name.

== See also ==
- Category:Taxa named by Robert Elias Fries
