= Cerconota melema =

Scientific classification
- Kingdom: Animalia
- Phylum: Arthropoda
- Clade: Pancrustacea
- Class: Insecta
- Order: Lepidoptera
- Family: Depressariidae
- Genus: Cerconota
- Species: C. melema

Binomial name
- Cerconota melema (Walsingham, 1913)

Synonyms
- Gonioterma melema Walsingham, 1913; Gonioterma cora Busck, 1914

Species of moth

Cerconota melema is a moth in the family Depressariidae. It was described by Lord Walsingham in 1913. It is found in Panama.

The wingspan is about 22 mm. The forewings are tawny testaceous (brick coloured) at the base, rather shining brownish ochraceous toward the costa and on the outer two-thirds, with three meandering transverse streaks of purplish grey. The first commencing on the costa at one-third and following a wavy course to the dorsum before the middle. The second from the middle of the costa, obliquely outward to the end of the cell descending thence nearly straight to the dorsum beyond the middle. The third halfway between this and the apex, less oblique at its costal origin, outwardly curved toward the termen about its middle, and approaching the second in its descent to the dorsum before the tornus. These streaks are very ill-defined. A somewhat distinct fuscous spot lies at the end of the cell, just within the angle of the second wavy line. An indistinct series of purplish-grey dots follows the termen at the base of the shining testaceous cilia. The hindwings are dull brownish cinereous.
