= Cerconota fermentata =

Scientific classification
- Kingdom: Animalia
- Phylum: Arthropoda
- Clade: Pancrustacea
- Class: Insecta
- Order: Lepidoptera
- Family: Depressariidae
- Genus: Cerconota
- Species: C. fermentata

Binomial name
- Cerconota fermentata (Meyrick, 1916)

Synonyms
- Stenoma fermentata Meyrick, 1916

Species of moth

Cerconota fermentata is a moth of the family Depressariidae. It is found in French Guiana.

The wingspan is 29–32 mm. The forewings are light ochreous-grey with the costal edge ochreous-whitish, edged beneath with fuscous and with a large very undefined patch of dark olive-brown suffusion occupying most of the basal half of the wing except towards the costa. There is a suffused purple streak along the dorsum from near the base to beyond the middle. The second discal stigma is small, indistinct and fuscous and there is a narrow curved fascia of olive brown suffusion from a dark brown mark on the middle of the costal edge to three-fourths of the dorsum, widened in the middle. A dark brown streak is found along the apical third of costa and there is a narrow terminal fascia of olive-brown suffusion, as well as a terminal series of small dark fuscous dots. The hindwings are dark grey, with a darker subbasal line.
