= Cerconota tinctipennis =

Scientific classification
- Kingdom: Animalia
- Phylum: Arthropoda
- Clade: Pancrustacea
- Class: Insecta
- Order: Lepidoptera
- Family: Depressariidae
- Genus: Cerconota
- Species: C. tinctipennis

Binomial name
- Cerconota tinctipennis (Butler, 1877)

Synonyms
- Cryptolechia tinctipennis Butler, 1877

Species of moth

Cerconota tinctipennis is a moth in the family Depressariidae. It was described by Arthur Gardiner Butler in 1877. It is found in Amazonas, Brazil.

The wingspan is about 22 mm. The forewings are clay coloured, with a shining pinky gloss, and the fringe incurved so as to look grey in certain lights. There is a spot in the cell, a second at the end of the cell, and a waved discal series of about six, all black. There are three brown ill-defined costal spots, the two first emitting an oblique streak to just in front of the two black discoidal spots and the third much larger, close to the apex, emitting no streak. The hindwings are bronzy brown, with the costal area pale.
