= Cerconota palliata =

Scientific classification
- Kingdom: Animalia
- Phylum: Arthropoda
- Clade: Pancrustacea
- Class: Insecta
- Order: Lepidoptera
- Family: Depressariidae
- Genus: Cerconota
- Species: C. palliata

Binomial name
- Cerconota palliata (Walsingham, 1913)

Synonyms
- Stenoma palliata Walsingham, 1913

Species of moth

Cerconota palliata is a moth in the family Depressariidae. It was described by Lord Walsingham in 1913. It is found in Guatemala.

The wingspan is about 21 mm. The forewings are pale ochreous, with three pale tawny costal spots, the first small, at one-third and the second larger, about the middle. The last outwardly oblique, somewhat reduplicated, at two-thirds. Beyond this a broken tawny brownish line follows the margin around the apex and termen to the tornus, where it converges with a very faint curved line preceding it. A chestnut-brown streak runs along the basal half of the fold, and below it, from the base to one-third, the space below the fold is occupied by a conspicuous dark tawny fuscous dorsal patch. A fuscous dot lies on the cross vein at the end of the cell. The hindwings are brassy brownish, with some bluish grey reflections.
