= Cerconota trichoneura =

Scientific classification
- Kingdom: Animalia
- Phylum: Arthropoda
- Clade: Pancrustacea
- Class: Insecta
- Order: Lepidoptera
- Family: Depressariidae
- Genus: Cerconota
- Species: C. trichoneura

Binomial name
- Cerconota trichoneura (Meyrick, 1913)

Synonyms
- Stenoma trichoneura Meyrick, 1913

Species of moth

Cerconota trichoneura is a moth in the family Depressariidae. It was described by Edward Meyrick in 1913. It is found in Venezuela.

The wingspan is 18–21 mm. The forewings are rosy-brownish-ochreous with the costal edge whitish-ochreous from near the base to near the apex. The stigmata are small, very indistinct and fuscous, the plical obliquely beyond the first discal. There is an unevenly curved series of indistinct fuscous dots or line from two-thirds of the costa to the tornus, as well as a series of indistinct fuscous dots around the apex and termen. The hindwings are whitish-grey-ochreous in males, and light grey in females.
