= Cerconota robiginosa =

Scientific classification
- Kingdom: Animalia
- Phylum: Arthropoda
- Clade: Pancrustacea
- Class: Insecta
- Order: Lepidoptera
- Family: Depressariidae
- Genus: Cerconota
- Species: C. robiginosa

Binomial name
- Cerconota robiginosa (Meyrick, 1925)

Synonyms
- Stenoma robiginosa Meyrick, 1925

Species of moth

Cerconota robiginosa is a moth of the family Depressariidae. It is found in Brazil (Amazonas).
