= Cerconota fulminata =

Scientific classification
- Kingdom: Animalia
- Phylum: Arthropoda
- Clade: Pancrustacea
- Class: Insecta
- Order: Lepidoptera
- Family: Depressariidae
- Genus: Cerconota
- Species: C. fulminata

Binomial name
- Cerconota fulminata (Meyrick, 1916)

Synonyms
- Stenoma fulminata Meyrick, 1916

Species of moth

Cerconota fulminata is a moth of the family Depressariidae. It is found in French Guiana.

The wingspan is 19 mm for males and 22 mm for females. The forewings are light brownish, with a pale greyish-ochreous gloss towards the costa and with the costal edge dark purple-fuscous towards the base. There is a thick streak of rather dark fuscous suffusion from the dorsum near the base obliquely upwards towards the middle of the disc, becoming lighter fuscous and continued to near the termen in the middle, margining the anterior half of a semi-fusiform dull violet patch extending along the dorsum to the tornus and edged above on its posterior third by a black streak. There is also a terminal series of cloudy blackish dots. The hindwings are rather dark grey.
