= Cerconota miseta =

Scientific classification
- Kingdom: Animalia
- Phylum: Arthropoda
- Clade: Pancrustacea
- Class: Insecta
- Order: Lepidoptera
- Family: Depressariidae
- Genus: Cerconota
- Species: C. miseta

Binomial name
- Cerconota miseta (Walsingham, 1913)

Synonyms
- Stenoma miseta Walsingham, 1913

Species of moth

Cerconota miseta is a moth in the family Depressariidae. It was described by Lord Walsingham in 1913. It is found in Costa Rica and French Guiana.

The wingspan is about 23 mm. The forewings are greyish brown, with a peculiar brassy grey (in some lights almost greenish) metallic sheen. Some almost obsolete darker markings are scarcely discernible; a small patch on the upper edge of the cell at about one-third, a sinuate streak from the costa beyond the middle, bowed outward and apparently continued to the dorsum at two-thirds, and a somewhat similar sinuate line nearer to the apex, also bowed outward at its middle and produced downward to the tornus. There is also a dark spot at the end of the cell. The hindwings are brownish fuscous.
