= Cerconota ebenocista =

Scientific classification
- Kingdom: Animalia
- Phylum: Arthropoda
- Clade: Pancrustacea
- Class: Insecta
- Order: Lepidoptera
- Family: Depressariidae
- Genus: Cerconota
- Species: C. ebenocista

Binomial name
- Cerconota ebenocista (Meyrick, 1928)

Synonyms
- Ptilogenes ebenocista Meyrick, 1928

Species of insect

Cerconota ebenocista is a moth in the family Depressariidae. It was described by Edward Meyrick in 1928. It is found in French Guiana.
