= Cerconota congressella =

Scientific classification
- Kingdom: Animalia
- Phylum: Arthropoda
- Clade: Pancrustacea
- Class: Insecta
- Order: Lepidoptera
- Family: Depressariidae
- Genus: Cerconota
- Species: C. congressella

Binomial name
- Cerconota congressella (Walker, 1864)

Synonyms
- Cryptolechia congressella Walker, 1864; Stenoma cycloptila Meyrick, 1915; Stenoma tyroxesta Meyrick, 1925; Stenoma omphacopa Meyrick, 1931

Species of moth

Cerconota congressella is a moth species within the family Depressariidae. It is native to Brazil (Amazonas), Guyana and Bolivia.
