= Cerconota sciaphilina =

Scientific classification
- Kingdom: Animalia
- Phylum: Arthropoda
- Clade: Pancrustacea
- Class: Insecta
- Order: Lepidoptera
- Family: Depressariidae
- Genus: Cerconota
- Species: C. sciaphilina

Binomial name
- Cerconota sciaphilina (Zeller, 1877)

Synonyms
- Cryptolechia sciaphilina Zeller, 1877; Stenoma torophragma Meyrick, 1915

Species of moth

Cerconota sciaphilina is a moth of the family Depressariidae. It is found in Mexico and Panama.

The wingspan is 19–21 mm. The forewings are grey, more or less suffusedly mixed with white, the costal edge white and with a suffused dark fuscous streak from the base of the costa to one-fifth of the dorsum. There are three cloudy dark fuscous transverse lines dilated on the costa, the first from one-fourth of the costa to the middle of the dorsum, rather irregular, the second from beyond the middle of the costa to three-fourths of the dorsum, rather irregular, edged with white anteriorly and more or less thickened with dark fuscous suffusion on the dorsal half posteriorly, the third from four-fifths of the costa to the tornus, sharply indented beneath the costa, then rather strongly curved outwards, edged anteriorly with white suffusion. There are eight blackish marginal marks around the apex and termen and the marginal area is suffused with white. The hindwings are grey.
