= Cerconota noverca =

Scientific classification
- Kingdom: Animalia
- Phylum: Arthropoda
- Clade: Pancrustacea
- Class: Insecta
- Order: Lepidoptera
- Family: Depressariidae
- Genus: Cerconota
- Species: C. noverca

Binomial name
- Cerconota noverca (Meyrick, 1916)

Synonyms
- Agriophara noverca Meyrick, 1916

Species of moth

Cerconota noverca is a moth of the family Depressariidae. It is found in French Guiana.

The wingspan is about 30 mm. The forewings are light brown mixed with dark brown and fuscous and with the costal edge blackish interrupted with whitish. The discal stigmata are ochreous-whitish, connected by a blackish line produced nearly to the subterminal line. There is a strongly curved subterminal line of cloudy dark fuscous dots and a dark fuscous terminal line dotted with ochreous-whitish. The hindwings are rather dark grey.
