= Cerconota fusigera =

Scientific classification
- Kingdom: Animalia
- Phylum: Arthropoda
- Clade: Pancrustacea
- Class: Insecta
- Order: Lepidoptera
- Family: Depressariidae
- Genus: Cerconota
- Species: C. fusigera

Binomial name
- Cerconota fusigera (Meyrick, 1915)

Synonyms
- Stenoma fusigera Meyrick, 1915

Species of moth

Cerconota fusigera is a moth of the family Depressariidae. It is found in the Guianas and Brazil.

The wingspan is 24–27 mm. The forewings are brassy-ochreous-greyish, the costal area and a cloudy somewhat curved subterminal fascia paler greyish-ochreous and with the extreme costal edge ochreous-whitish towards the middle. There is a small dark purple-fuscous spot on the middle of the costa and a fusiform fuscous mark extending along the costa from two-thirds to near the apex. The hindwings are dark grey.
