= Cerconota minna =

Scientific classification
- Kingdom: Animalia
- Phylum: Arthropoda
- Clade: Pancrustacea
- Class: Insecta
- Order: Lepidoptera
- Family: Depressariidae
- Genus: Cerconota
- Species: C. minna

Binomial name
- Cerconota minna (Busck, 1914)

Synonyms
- Gonioterma minna Busck, 1914; Stenoma orthridia Meyrick, 1916

Species of moth

Cerconota minna is a moth of the family Depressariidae. It is found in Panama, the Guianas, Bolivia and Brazil.

The wingspan is 23–25 mm. The forewings are fuscous with the costa narrowly suffused with pale purplish, towards the base darker purplish-fuscous, the extreme costal edge sometimes partially whitish. There is a narrow dark purplish-fuscous mark along the costa in the middle, and a stronger one on the costa from two-thirds to near the apex and a suffused purplish-brown streak from one-fourth of the dorsum to the lower angle of the cell, as well as a very indistinct small dark fuscous dot on the upper angle of the cell. A very faint darker waved line or series of dots is found from three-fourths of the costa to the dorsum near the tornus, obtusely bent in the disc. The terminal edge is tinged with bronzy-brown, with indistinct small dark fuscous dots. The hindwings are grey, darker posteriorly.
