= Cerconota siraphora =

Scientific classification
- Kingdom: Animalia
- Phylum: Arthropoda
- Clade: Pancrustacea
- Class: Insecta
- Order: Lepidoptera
- Family: Depressariidae
- Genus: Cerconota
- Species: C. siraphora

Binomial name
- Cerconota siraphora (Meyrick, 1915)

Synonyms
- Stenoma siraphora Meyrick, 1915; Stenoma leucosaris Meyrick, 1925

Species of moth

Cerconota siraphora is a moth of the family Depressariidae. It is found in Guyana, French Guiana, Brazil and Peru.

The wingspan is about 20 mm. The forewings are greyish-violet with the extreme costal edge whitish and with some violet-fuscous suffusion towards the dorsum about one-fourth. The plical and second discal stigmata are dark fuscous and there is a small cloudy violet-fuscous spot on the middle of the costa, where a strongly curved series of dark fuscous dots runs to the dorsum at two-thirds. There is a rather larger flattened-triangular violet-fuscous spot on the costa at three-fourths, where a series of dark fuscous dots runs to the dorsum before the tornus, indented beneath the costa and curved outwards in the disc. There is a terminal series of dark fuscous dots. The hindwings are grey, paler towards the base.
