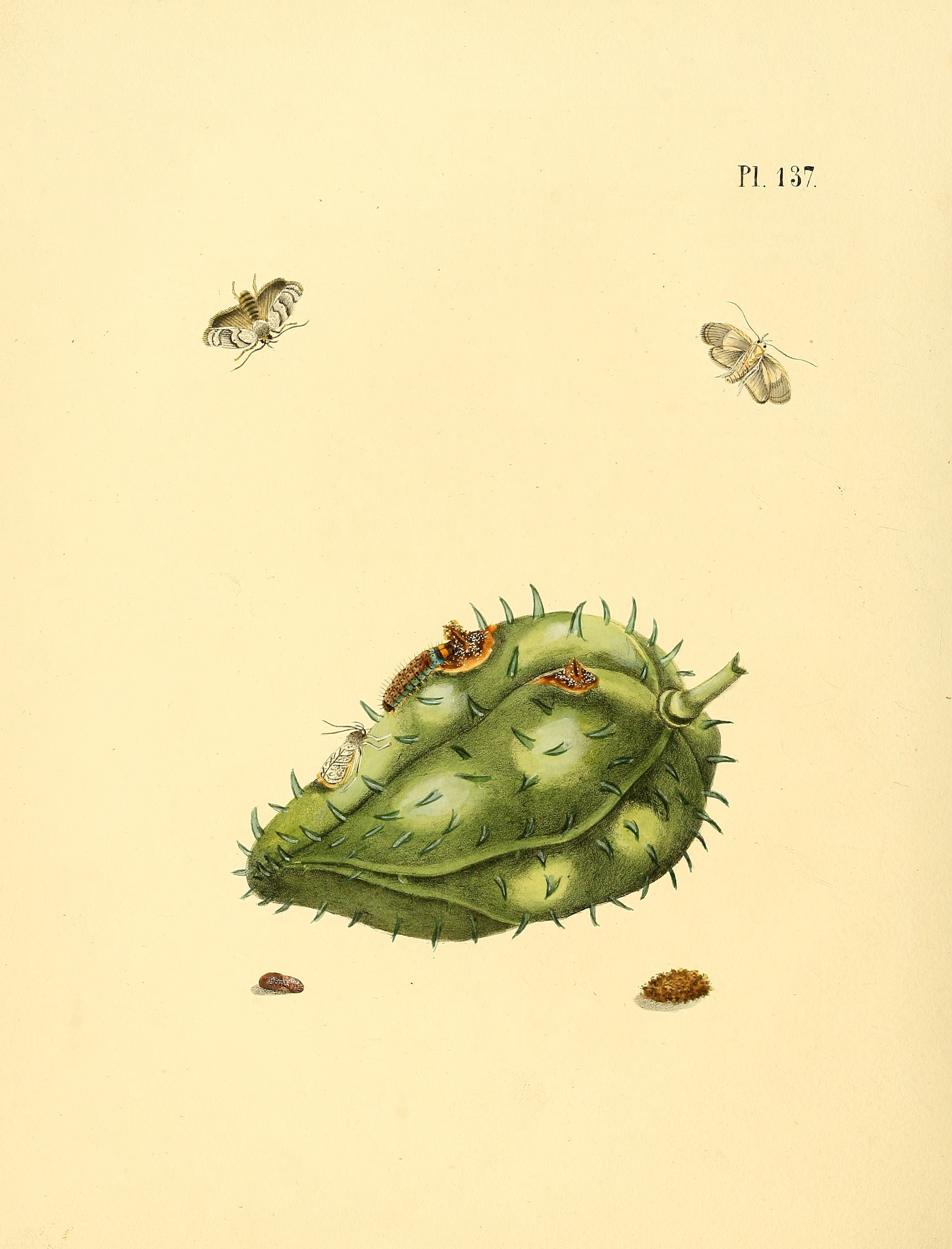
- C. anonella on Annona muricata

Scientific classification
- Kingdom: Animalia
- Phylum: Arthropoda
- Clade: Pancrustacea
- Class: Insecta
- Order: Lepidoptera
- Family: Depressariidae
- Genus: Cerconota
- Species: C. anonella

Binomial name
- Cerconota anonella (Sepp, 1830)

Synonyms
- Phalaena anonella Sepp, 1855; Stenoma hamon Busck, 1911; Stenoma strophalodes Meyrick, 1915

= Cerconota anonella =

Annona fruit borer

Species of moth

Cerconota anonella, the annona fruit borer, is a moth of the family Depressariidae. It is found in Suriname, French Guiana, Peru, Honduras and on Hispaniola.

The wingspan is about 22 mm. The forewings are white, anteriorly with scattered fuscous specks and with a straight cloudy fuscous shade from one-fifth of the costa to the middle of the dorsum, as well as a small dark fuscous spot representing the second discal stigma. There is an irregular fuscous shade from the middle of the costa to three-fourths of the dorsum, obtusely angulated in the middle. A curved fuscous line is found from three-fourths of the costa to the dorsum before the tornus, indented towards the costa. There is also a series of dark fuscous marginal marks around the posterior part of the costa and termen. The hindwings are grey.

It is known to cause significant damage to the fruits of plant genus Annona.
