= Cerconota brachyplaca =

Scientific classification
- Kingdom: Animalia
- Phylum: Arthropoda
- Clade: Pancrustacea
- Class: Insecta
- Order: Lepidoptera
- Family: Depressariidae
- Genus: Cerconota
- Species: C. brachyplaca

Binomial name
- Cerconota brachyplaca (Meyrick, 1926)

Synonyms
- Ptilogenes brachyplaca Meyrick, 1926

Species of moth

Cerconota brachyplaca is a moth of the family Depressariidae. It is found in Brazil and French Guiana.
