= Cerconota capnosphaera =

Scientific classification
- Kingdom: Animalia
- Phylum: Arthropoda
- Clade: Pancrustacea
- Class: Insecta
- Order: Lepidoptera
- Family: Depressariidae
- Genus: Cerconota
- Species: C. capnosphaera

Binomial name
- Cerconota capnosphaera (Meyrick, 1916)

Synonyms
- Stenoma capnosphaera Meyrick, 1916

Species of moth

Cerconota capnosphaera is a moth of the family Depressariidae. It is found in French Guiana.

The wingspan is 17–18 mm. The forewings are light brownish-ochreous, somewhat sprinkled with light grey and with a small grey spot on the base of the dorsum and with a roundish dark slaty-grey blotch resting on the costa about one-fifth and reaching half across the wing, followed by two small grey spots. There is a very dark brown trapezoidal blotch extending on the dorsum from two-fifths to three-fourths, reaching half across the wing, narrowed upwards. A very dark brown transverse-oval blotch is found towards the termen, the area between this and the dorsal blotch dark slaty grey, forming an irregular patch extending upwards in front of the subterminal blotch nearly to the costa. There are two or three small irregular dark grey marks towards the costa on the posterior half and a dark slaty-grey pre-terminal streak, only narrowly separated from the preceding blotch above and touching it beneath. The hindwings are dark fuscous.
