= Cerconota consobrina =

Scientific classification
- Kingdom: Animalia
- Phylum: Arthropoda
- Clade: Pancrustacea
- Class: Insecta
- Order: Lepidoptera
- Family: Depressariidae
- Genus: Cerconota
- Species: C. consobrina

Binomial name
- Cerconota consobrina (Meyrick, 1915)

Synonyms
- Stenoma consobrina Meyrick, 1915

Species of moth

Cerconota consobrina is a moth of the family Depressariidae. It is found in Guyana.

The wingspan is 20–21 mm. The forewings are violet-fuscous. The plical and first discal stigmata are darker fuscous, the plical obliquely posterior, the second discal dark fuscous. There are three cloudy dark fuscous lines, the first from one-third of the costa to the middle of the dorsum, interrupted between the stigmata, the second from the middle of the costa to four-fifths of the dorsum, shortly curved outwards around the end of the cell, the third from three-fourths of the costa to just before the tornus, rather curved outwards in the disc, somewhat waved. There is also a marginal series of dark fuscous dots around the apex and termen. The hindwings are grey.
