= Cerconota dimorpha =

Scientific classification
- Kingdom: Animalia
- Phylum: Arthropoda
- Clade: Pancrustacea
- Class: Insecta
- Order: Lepidoptera
- Family: Depressariidae
- Genus: Cerconota
- Species: C. dimorpha

Binomial name
- Cerconota dimorpha Duckworth, 1962

Species of moth

Cerconota dimorpha is a moth in the family Depressariidae. It was described by W. Donald Duckworth in 1962. It is found in Ecuador.
