= Cerconota nitens =

Scientific classification
- Kingdom: Animalia
- Phylum: Arthropoda
- Clade: Pancrustacea
- Class: Insecta
- Order: Lepidoptera
- Family: Depressariidae
- Genus: Cerconota
- Species: C. nitens

Binomial name
- Cerconota nitens (Butler, 1877)

Synonyms
- Cryptolechia nitens Butler, 1877

Species of moth

Cerconota nitens is a moth in the family Depressariidae. It was described by Arthur Gardiner Butler in 1877. It is found in Brazil (Amazonas).

The wingspan is about 23 mm. The forewings are shining pinky-brown with the costal margin white, interrupted by brown spots. The costal area is greyish and there are three dark brown costal spots, the first small, before the middle, the second large, oblong, just beyond the middle, the third longer and narrower than the second near the apex, the two last connected below by an arched bracket of the same colour. There is a semi-circular black and grey spot before the middle of the inner margin and an oblique litura across the sub-costal area, and a zigzag-transverse line beyond the cell, brown, indistinct. A series of six dots crosses the lower two-thirds of the disc and the margin and fringe are bronzy. The hindwings are shining pale brown.
