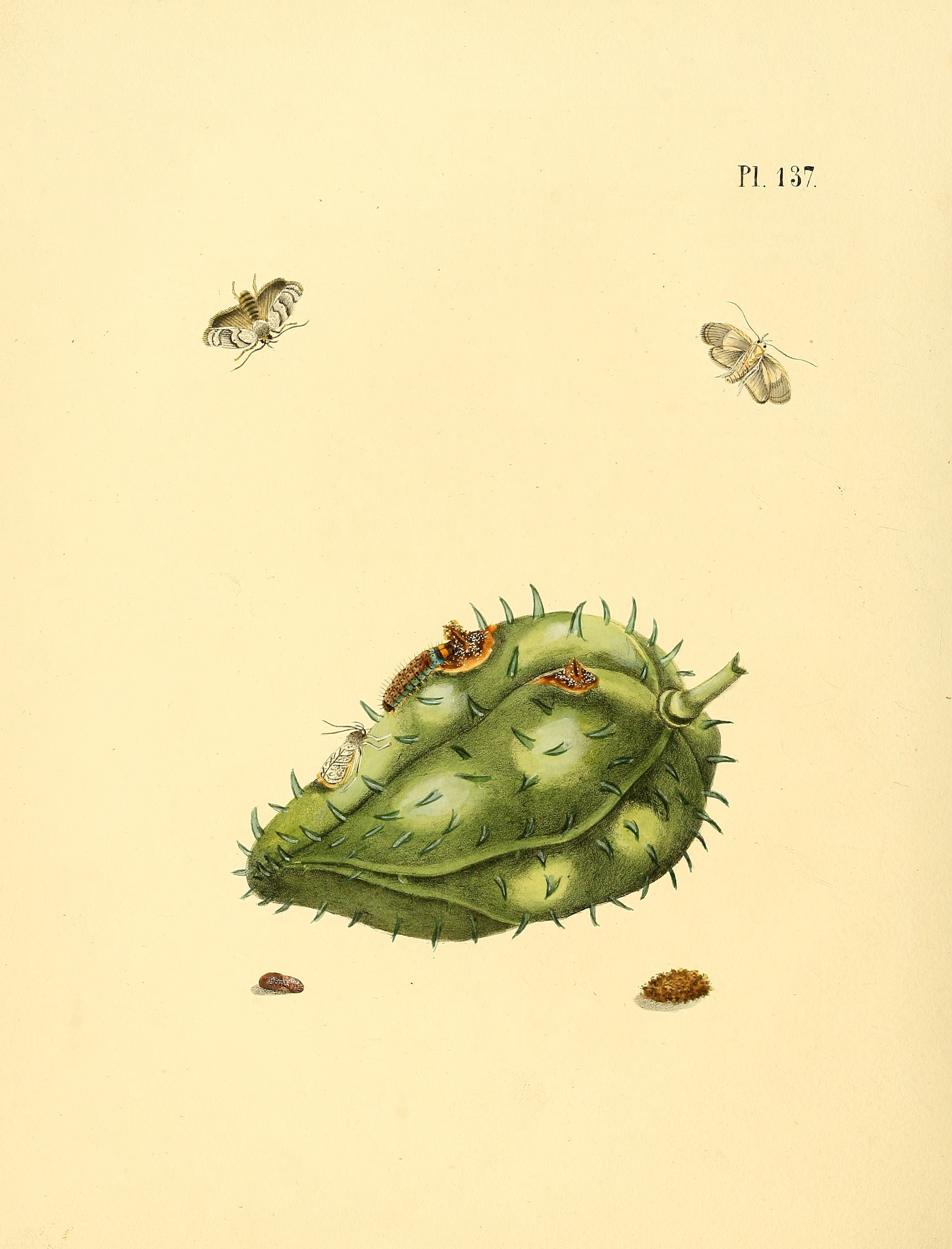
- Illustration of Phalaena anonella Sepp (= Cerconota anonella). The fruit in the illustration is Annona muricata.(Phalaena was originally a subdivision of Lepidoptera, created by Carolus Linnaeus, and included moths in general.It is now obsolete, having been replaced by the various families currently under lepidoptera.)

Scientific classification
- Kingdom: Animalia
- Phylum: Arthropoda
- Clade: Pancrustacea
- Class: Insecta
- Order: Lepidoptera
- Family: Depressariidae
- Subfamily: Stenomatinae
- Genus: Cerconota; Meyrick, 1915

Type species
- Cerconota tridesma Meyrick, 1915

Synonyms
- Pomphocrita Meyrick, 1930

= Cerconota =

Genus of moths

Cerconota is a genus of moths in the family Depressariidae. In 1991, I. W. B. Nye and David Stephen Fletcher included it in the family Oecophoridae and the subfamily Stenomatinae. It was later placed in the family Elachistidae and subfamily Stenomatinae by Ronald W. Hodges, in Niels Peder Kristensen (1999). Other classifications placed them in the Elachistidae or Oecophoridae, but they actually seem to belong to the Depressariidae.

== Species ==
- Cerconota acajuti Becker, 1971
- Cerconota achatina (Zeller, 1855)
- Cerconota agraria (Meyrick, 1925)
- Cerconota anonella (Sepp, 1855)
- Cerconota aphanes (Walsingham, 1912)
- Cerconota armiferella (Walker, 1864)
- Cerconota atricassis (Meyrick, 1916)
- Cerconota bathyphaea (Meyrick, 1932)
- Cerconota brachyplaca (Meyrick, 1926)
- Cerconota capnosphaera (Meyrick, 1916)
- Cerconota carbonifer (Busck, 1914)
- Cerconota censoria (Meyrick, 1915)
- Cerconota certiorata (Meyrick, 1932)
- Cerconota congressella (Walker, 1864)
- Cerconota consobrina (Meyrick, 1915)
- Cerconota dimorpha Duckworth, 1962
- Cerconota dryoscia (Meyrick, 1932)
- Cerconota ebenocista (Meyrick, 1928)
- Cerconota emma (Busck, 1911)
- Cerconota eriacma (Meyrick, 1915)
- Cerconota fermentata (Meyrick, 1916)
- Cerconota figularis (Meyrick, 1918)
- Cerconota flexibilis (Meyrick, 1916)
- Cerconota fulminata (Meyrick, 1916)
- Cerconota fusigera (Meyrick, 1915)
- Cerconota hexascia (Meyrick, 1925)
- Cerconota horometra (Meyrick, 1925)
- Cerconota hydrelaeas (Meyrick, 1931)
- Cerconota impressella (Walker, 1864)
- Cerconota inturbatella (Walker, 1864)
- Cerconota ischnoscia (Meyrick, 1932)
- Cerconota languescens (Meyrick, 1915)
- Cerconota lutulenta (Zeller, 1877)
- Cerconota lysalges (Walsingham, 1913)
- Cerconota machinatrix (Meyrick, 1925)
- Cerconota melema (Walsingham, 1913)
- Cerconota minna (Busck, 1914)
- Cerconota miseta (Walsingham, 1913)
- Cerconota myrodora (Meyrick, 1925)
- Cerconota nimbosa (Zeller, 1877)
- Cerconota nitens (Butler, 1877)
- Cerconota noverca (Meyrick, 1916)
- Cerconota nymphas (Meyrick, 1916)
- Cerconota obsordescens (Meyrick, 1930)
- Cerconota oceanitis (Meyrick, 1916)
- Cerconota palliata (Walsingham, 1913)
- Cerconota phaeophanes (Meyrick, 1912)
- Cerconota ptilosema Meyrick, 1918
- Cerconota recurrens (Meyrick, 1925)
- Cerconota recurvella (Walker, 1864)
- Cerconota robiginosa (Meyrick, 1925)
- Cerconota rosacea (Butler, 1877)
- Cerconota sciaphilina (Zeller, 1877)
- Cerconota scolopacina (Walsingham, 1913)
- Cerconota seducta (Meyrick, 1918)
- Cerconota siraphora (Meyrick, 1915)
- Cerconota sphragidopis (Meyrick, 1915)
- Cerconota stylonota (Meyrick, 1915)
- Cerconota tabida (Butler, 1877)
- Cerconota tholodes (Meyrick, 1915)
- Cerconota tinctipennis (Butler, 1877)
- Cerconota tricharacta (Meyrick, 1925)
- Cerconota trichoneura (Meyrick, 1913)
- Cerconota tridesma Meyrick, 1915
- Cerconota trizeucta (Meyrick, 1930)
- Cerconota trochistis (Meyrick, 1916)
- Cerconota trymalopa (Meyrick, 1925)
- Cerconota tumulata (Meyrick, 1916)
