= Cerconota recurvella =

Scientific classification
- Kingdom: Animalia
- Phylum: Arthropoda
- Clade: Pancrustacea
- Class: Insecta
- Order: Lepidoptera
- Family: Depressariidae
- Genus: Cerconota
- Species: C. recurvella

Binomial name
- Cerconota recurvella (Walker, 1864)

Synonyms
- Cryptolechia recurvella Walker, 1864; Stenoma pseudacma Meyrick, 1918

Species of moth

Cerconota recurvella is a moth in the family Depressariidae. It was described by Francis Walker in 1864. It is found in the Guianas, Colombia and Tefé, Brazil.

The wingspan is about 28 mm. The forewings are light bronzy brownish, posteriorly brassy tinged and with the costal edge purple fuscous, beneath this several slight cloudy purple-whitish marks from one-fourth to near the apex. There is some obscure irregular grey marking on the basal area, and indicating two faint irregular-dentate lines angulated near the costa, running from one-fourth and beyond the middle of the costa to two-fifths and two-thirds of the dorsum respectively. There is a zigzag series of six small black dots from four-fifths of the costa to a small blackish pre-tornal spot. The hindwings are light grey, with the apical edge suffused with pale ochreous.
