= Cerconota achatina =

Scientific classification
- Kingdom: Animalia
- Phylum: Arthropoda
- Clade: Pancrustacea
- Class: Insecta
- Order: Lepidoptera
- Family: Depressariidae
- Genus: Cerconota
- Species: C. achatina

Binomial name
- Cerconota achatina (Zeller, 1855)

Synonyms
- Cryptolechia achatina Zeller, 1855; Stenoma lembifera Meyrick, 1915; Stenoma punicea Meyrick, 1916

Species of moth

Cerconota achatina is a moth of the family Depressariidae. It is found in Colombia, Guyana and French Guiana.

The wingspan is 16–17 mm. The forewings are fuscous-purple with the costal edge ochreous-whitish on the anterior half and with a patch of darker fuscous-purple suffusion on the basal fourth of the dorsum, reaching half across the wing, the dorsal scale-projection suffused with ferruginous-brown. There is a very elongate-triangular dark reddish-fuscous patch extending along the costa from before the middle to near the apex, reaching one-fourth across the wing, edged beneath with pale ochreous. The stigmata are dark fuscous, the first discal adjoining the dorsal patch, the plical indistinct, the second discal forming a small transverse-oval spot, followed by a blotch of pale ochreous suffusion touching the costal patch and sending a dark fuscous shade edged by two indistinct pale ochreous lines to the dorsum before the tornus. There is also a fine dark fuscous terminal line. The hindwings are whitish-ochreous tinged with grey except towards the base and apex in males and dark grey in females.
