= Cerconota trochistis =

Scientific classification
- Kingdom: Animalia
- Phylum: Arthropoda
- Clade: Pancrustacea
- Class: Insecta
- Order: Lepidoptera
- Family: Depressariidae
- Genus: Cerconota
- Species: C. trochistis

Binomial name
- Cerconota trochistis (Meyrick, 1916)

Synonyms
- Stenoma trochistis Meyrick, 1916

Species of moth

Cerconota trochistis is a moth of the family Depressariidae. It is found in French Guiana.

The wingspan is 23–28 mm. The forewings are light fuscous with the extreme costal edge whitish-ochreous, near the base dark fuscous. There are three dark fuscous costal spots, the first at one-fourth is small, the second in the middle is subtriangular and the third about three-fourths is elongate. An irregular patch of rather dark fuscous suffusion or irroration is found towards the dorsum and the disc anteriorly, sometimes almost obsolete. The first discal stigma is usually obscured in this, the plical and second discal dark fuscous. There is a very indistinctly indicated darker fuscous line from the second costal spot to three-fourths of the dorsum, strongly curved outwards in the disc, as well as a waved interrupted cloudy dark fuscous or blackish line from the third costal spot to the dorsum before the tornus, the median third curved outwards but sinuate in the middle. A marginal series of large cloudy dark fuscous dots is found around the apex and termen, confluent into a small spot beneath the apex. The hindwings are grey.
