= Cerconota lysalges =

Scientific classification
- Kingdom: Animalia
- Phylum: Arthropoda
- Clade: Pancrustacea
- Class: Insecta
- Order: Lepidoptera
- Family: Depressariidae
- Genus: Cerconota
- Species: C. lysalges

Binomial name
- Cerconota lysalges (Walsingham, 1913)

Synonyms
- Gonioterma lysalges Walsingham, 1913

Species of moth

Cerconota lysalges is a moth in the family Depressariidae. It was described by Lord Walsingham in 1913. It is found in Panama.

The wingspan is about 15 mm. The forewings are pale testaceous, with a slight tawny gloss, a small brown costal spot on the summit of the arched portion of the wing followed by a larger spot of the same colour on the middle of the costa where the margin is most depressed. The hindwings are brownish testaceous.
