= Cerconota nymphas =

Scientific classification
- Kingdom: Animalia
- Phylum: Arthropoda
- Clade: Pancrustacea
- Class: Insecta
- Order: Lepidoptera
- Family: Depressariidae
- Genus: Cerconota
- Species: C. nymphas

Binomial name
- Cerconota nymphas (Meyrick, 1916)

Synonyms
- Stenoma nymphas Meyrick, 1916

Species of moth

Cerconota nymphas is a moth of the family Depressariidae. It is found in French Guiana.

The wingspan is 14–16 mm. The forewings are light violet, the costal edge whitish-yellowish and with a small dark fuscous costal mark at one-fourth, and some scattered undefined blackish dots and scales between this and the dorsum. The stigmata are small and blackish, the plical obliquely beyond the first discal and there is a narrow semi-oval dark brown costal spots at the middle and three-fourths, becoming blackish on the costal edge, the first sending an irregular curved series of very indistinct cloudy dark fuscous dots to three-fourths of the dorsum, the second a curved series of distinct blackish dots to the tornus. A marginal series of dark fuscous dots suffused with brown is found around the apex and termen. The hindwings are rather dark grey.
