= Cerconota myrodora =

Scientific classification
- Kingdom: Animalia
- Phylum: Arthropoda
- Clade: Pancrustacea
- Class: Insecta
- Order: Lepidoptera
- Family: Depressariidae
- Genus: Cerconota
- Species: C. myrodora

Binomial name
- Cerconota myrodora (Meyrick, 1925)

Synonyms
- Stenoma myrodora Meyrick, 1925

Species of moth

Cerconota myrodora is a moth of the family Depressariidae. It is found in Brazil (Amazonas), French Guiana and Guyana.
