= Cerconota stylonota =

Scientific classification
- Kingdom: Animalia
- Phylum: Arthropoda
- Clade: Pancrustacea
- Class: Insecta
- Order: Lepidoptera
- Family: Depressariidae
- Genus: Cerconota
- Species: C. stylonota

Binomial name
- Cerconota stylonota (Meyrick, 1915)

Synonyms
- Stenoma stylonota Meyrick, 1915

Species of moth

Cerconota stylonota is a moth of the family Depressariidae. It is found in Guyana.

The wingspan is about 17 mm. The forewings are light brownish with a short oblique cloudy rather dark fuscous mark on the costa before the middle and a slender blackish-fuscous streak suffused with reddish-brown along the dorsum from one-fifth to three-fifths, as well as a short fuscous line along the dorsum about four-fifths, with a short inwardly oblique similar line from its posterior extremity. The terminal area is indefinitely suffused with brown except towards the tornus. The hindwings are rather dark grey, strewn with blackish hairscales.
