= Cerconota rosacea =

Scientific classification
- Kingdom: Animalia
- Phylum: Arthropoda
- Clade: Pancrustacea
- Class: Insecta
- Order: Lepidoptera
- Family: Depressariidae
- Genus: Cerconota
- Species: C. rosacea

Binomial name
- Cerconota rosacea (Butler, 1877)

Synonyms
- Cryptolechia rosacea Butler, 1877; Stenoma erotarcha Meyrick, 1915

Species of moth

Cerconota rosacea is a moth of the family Depressariidae. It is found in the Amazon region and French Guiana.

The wingspan is 29–31 mm. The forewings are light rosy-fuscous, suffused with pink towards the costa and with the dorsal area suffused with darker fuscous on the basal half. A straight dark fuscous shade from one-fourth of the costa to beyond the middle of the dorsum, suffused posteriorly. There is a short cloudy fuscous transverse mark on the costa before the middle and two small faintly connected dark fuscous dots transversely placed on the end of the cell. A slightly curved dark fuscous transverse line at five-sixths, preceded on the costal half by a large blotch of dark fuscous suffusion. There is also a terminal series of small black dots. The hindwings are whitish-ochreous, the apical half suffused with pale rosy-crimson.
