= Cerconota flexibilis =

Scientific classification
- Kingdom: Animalia
- Phylum: Arthropoda
- Clade: Pancrustacea
- Class: Insecta
- Order: Lepidoptera
- Family: Depressariidae
- Genus: Cerconota
- Species: C. flexibilis

Binomial name
- Cerconota flexibilis (Meyrick, 1916)

Synonyms
- Stenoma flexibilis Meyrick, 1916

Species of moth

Cerconota flexibilis is a moth of the family Depressariidae. It is found in French Guiana.

The wingspan is 23–24 mm. The forewings are whitish-violet-fuscous with the costal edge whitish and with a suffused dark fuscous streak from the base of the dorsum curved upwards to beneath the middle of the wing and then descending to the tornus, narrowly obliquely interrupted at two-thirds, the dorsal area within this mostly suffused with violet, and including a slender violet-blackish somewhat upcurved subdorsal streak in its median portion and another above the posterior portion of this running into the upper streak towards the tornus. The second discal stigma is small and dark grey and there is a slight oblique grey strigula from the costa before the middle, where a very oblique series of several cloudy dark fuscous dots runs to the disc beyond the cell. There is also a small triangular violet-fuscous apical blotch and a transverse mark of blackish suffusion before the termen in the middle, as well as a terminal series of subquadrate black dots suffused with dark brown. The hindwings are grey, becoming darker posteriorly.
