= Cerconota armiferella =

Scientific classification
- Kingdom: Animalia
- Phylum: Arthropoda
- Clade: Pancrustacea
- Class: Insecta
- Order: Lepidoptera
- Family: Depressariidae
- Genus: Cerconota
- Species: C. armiferella

Binomial name
- Cerconota armiferella (Walker, 1864)

Synonyms
- Cryptolechia armiferella Walker, 1864

Species of moth

Cerconota armiferella is a moth in the family Depressariidae. It was described by Francis Walker in 1864. It is found in Amazonas, Brazil.

Adults are a pale fawn colour, with nearly half the length from the exterior border of the forewings pale testaceous (brick coloured) cinereous (ash coloured) two transverse denticulated darker lines. There are some elongated black costal points and a black streak by the interior angle and another near the base of the interior border. There are also two discal points, one in the middle, the other exterior and the marginal points are black. The hindwings are aeneous (bronze coloured).
