= Cerconota scolopacina =

Scientific classification
- Kingdom: Animalia
- Phylum: Arthropoda
- Clade: Pancrustacea
- Class: Insecta
- Order: Lepidoptera
- Family: Depressariidae
- Genus: Cerconota
- Species: C. scolopacina

Binomial name
- Cerconota scolopacina (Walsingham, 1913)

Synonyms
- Stenoma scolopacina Walsingham, 1913

Species of moth

Cerconota scolopacina is a moth in the family Depressariidae. It was described by Lord Walsingham in 1913. It is found in Panama.

The wingspan is about 32 mm. The forewings are pale rust-brownish, with a dorsal shade near the base, two costal shades before the middle, and another from beyond the middle to the apex, together with several obliquely transverse striate shades above the middle. All dark tawny brown, the intervening spaces partially suffused with pale tawny the light chestnut-brown ground colour showing also a considerable admixture of paler brownish ochreous. A tawny brown transverse spot, at the end of the cell, is preceded by another on the fold and a narrow marginal shade of the same colour occurs along the termen. The hindwings are brownish grey.
