= Cerconota oceanitis =

Scientific classification
- Kingdom: Animalia
- Phylum: Arthropoda
- Clade: Pancrustacea
- Class: Insecta
- Order: Lepidoptera
- Family: Depressariidae
- Genus: Cerconota
- Species: C. oceanitis

Binomial name
- Cerconota oceanitis (Meyrick, 1916)

Synonyms
- Stenoma oceanitis Meyrick, 1916

Species of moth

Cerconota oceanitis is a moth of the family Depressariidae. It is found in French Guiana.

The wingspan is 20–21 mm. The forewings are pale purplish, tinged with pale greenish except towards the costa and with the costal edge ferruginous-yellowish. There is a cloudy dark fuscous dot at the base of the costa and there are three dark fuscous costal spots, the first at one-fourth is small, the second before the middle is oblique and narrowest on the edge and the third about three-fourths is elongate-semioval. There are vague indications of greenish-fuscous lines proceeding from the first two of these, the second curved outwards around a small discal spot on the end of the cell. A series of small dark fuscous dots runs from third costal spot to the dorsum before the tornus, curved outwards in the disc and there is a small dark fuscous mark on the costa before the apex, and a partially confluent series of similar marks along the termen. The hindwings are grey, but darker towards the apex.
