= Cerconota machinatrix =

Scientific classification
- Kingdom: Animalia
- Phylum: Arthropoda
- Clade: Pancrustacea
- Class: Insecta
- Order: Lepidoptera
- Family: Depressariidae
- Genus: Cerconota
- Species: C. machinatrix

Binomial name
- Cerconota machinatrix Meyrick, 1925

Synonyms
- Stenoma machinatrix Meyrick, 1925

Species of moth

Cerconota machinatrix is a moth of the family Depressariidae. It is found in Colombia.
