= Cerconota languescens =

Scientific classification
- Kingdom: Animalia
- Phylum: Arthropoda
- Clade: Pancrustacea
- Class: Insecta
- Order: Lepidoptera
- Family: Depressariidae
- Genus: Cerconota
- Species: C. languescens

Binomial name
- Cerconota languescens (Meyrick, 1915)

Synonyms
- Stenoma languescens Meyrick, 1915

Species of moth

Cerconota languescens is a moth of the family Depressariidae. It is found in Guyana, French Guiana and Brazil.

The wingspan is about 20 mm. The forewings are greyish-ochreous, slightly pinkish-tinged with the costa slenderly grey. The stigmata are blackish, the plical very obliquely beyond the first discal, an additional larger dot between the plical and first discal. There are three small cloudy fuscous spots on the costa at one-third and before and beyond the middle, the first two emitting short cloudy rather dark fuscous transverse streaks, where faint irregular lines of fuscous irroration cross the wing, the first to the dorsum before the middle, the second strongly curved around the cell to beneath the second discal stigma, then to three-fourths of the dorsum. There is a series of cloudy dark fuscous dots from the third costal spot to the dorsum before the tornus, strongly curved outwards in the disc, indented above and below this. There is also a marginal series of dark fuscous dots around the apex and termen. The hindwings are rather dark grey.
