= Cerconota tumulata =

Scientific classification
- Kingdom: Animalia
- Phylum: Arthropoda
- Clade: Pancrustacea
- Class: Insecta
- Order: Lepidoptera
- Family: Depressariidae
- Genus: Cerconota
- Species: C. tumulata

Binomial name
- Cerconota tumulata (Meyrick, 1916)

Synonyms
- Stenoma tumulata Meyrick, 1916

Species of moth

Cerconota tumulata is a moth of the family Depressariidae. It is found in French Guiana.

The wingspan is about 22 mm. The forewings are pale ochreous, becoming ochreous-brown towards the costa and termen, the costal edge fuscous. There is a large semi-fusiform violet patch extending along the dorsum from near the base to the tornus, widest in the middle, where it reaches half across the wing, and then gradually rounded-attenuated to a point at each end, its upper margin marked on the anterior half with a blackish-fuscous streak edged beneath with some yellowish-ferruginous suffusion. The hindwings are rather dark grey, the cell somewhat suffused with ochreous-whitish.
