= Cerconota sphragidopis =

Scientific classification
- Kingdom: Animalia
- Phylum: Arthropoda
- Clade: Pancrustacea
- Class: Insecta
- Order: Lepidoptera
- Family: Depressariidae
- Genus: Cerconota
- Species: C. sphragidopis

Binomial name
- Cerconota sphragidopis (Meyrick, 1915)

Synonyms
- Stenoma sphragidopis Meyrick, 1915

Species of moth

Cerconota sphragidopis is a moth of the family Depressariidae. It is found in Guyana and French Guiana.

The wingspan is 25–26 mm. The forewings are grey, sometimes tinged with brownish and with an undefined fuscous blotch occupying the basal third of the dorsum and reaching two-thirds across the wing. There are three or four slender very irregular and indistinct fuscous lines crossing the wing, the last running from three-fourths of the costa to the tornus and marked with a round reddish-fuscous blotch in the disc. A reddish-fuscous marginal streak is found around the posterior part of the costa and termen, widest at the apex. The hindwings are rather dark grey.
