= Cerconota ptilosema =

Scientific classification
- Kingdom: Animalia
- Phylum: Arthropoda
- Clade: Pancrustacea
- Class: Insecta
- Order: Lepidoptera
- Family: Depressariidae
- Genus: Cerconota
- Species: C. ptilosema

Binomial name
- Cerconota ptilosema Meyrick, 1918

Species of moth

Cerconota ptilosema is a moth of the family Depressariidae. It is found in French Guiana.

The wingspan is about 18 mm. The forewings are light brown, faintly pinkish tinged and with an irregularly curved transverse series of small cloudy dark fuscous dots from small cloudy wedge-shaped grey marks on the costa at one-third and three-fourths, a similar costal mark in the middle. The stigmata are small, cloudy and dark fuscous, the first discal preceding the first transverse line, the plical equidistant between the first and second discal. There is a dorsal scale-projection at one-fourth, orange tipped whitish. There is also a terminal series of small dark fuscous dots. The hindwings are rather light grey.
