= Cerconota trymalopa =

Scientific classification
- Kingdom: Animalia
- Phylum: Arthropoda
- Clade: Pancrustacea
- Class: Insecta
- Order: Lepidoptera
- Family: Depressariidae
- Genus: Cerconota
- Species: C. trymalopa

Binomial name
- Cerconota trymalopa (Meyrick, 1925)

Synonyms
- Stenoma trymalopa Meyrick, 1925

Species of moth

Cerconota trymalopa is a moth of the family Depressariidae. It is found in Colombia.
