= Cerconota horometra =

Scientific classification
- Kingdom: Animalia
- Phylum: Arthropoda
- Clade: Pancrustacea
- Class: Insecta
- Order: Lepidoptera
- Family: Depressariidae
- Genus: Cerconota
- Species: C. horometra

Binomial name
- Cerconota horometra (Meyrick, 1925)

Synonyms
- Stenoma horometra Meyrick, 1925

Species of moth

Cerconota horometra is a moth of the family Depressariidae. It is found in Peru.

The wingspan is about 25 mm. The forewings are whitish closely irrorated fuscous with several suffused dark brown lines, one slightly curved subdorsal from the base to the tornus, two parallel oblique from the costa before one-third and at the middle running into this, one from the costa at three-fourths running into the second of these below the middle, one rising out of this above the middle, running halfway to the termen, then right-angled to the subdorsal line near the tornus, and one around the apex and termen. There are some fine dark brown interneural lines towards the termen but not reaching it or the preceding line. The hindwings are grey.
