= Cerconota eriacma =

Scientific classification
- Kingdom: Animalia
- Phylum: Arthropoda
- Clade: Pancrustacea
- Class: Insecta
- Order: Lepidoptera
- Family: Depressariidae
- Genus: Cerconota
- Species: C. eriacma

Binomial name
- Cerconota eriacma (Meyrick, 1915)

Synonyms
- Stenoma eriacma Meyrick, 1915

Species of moth

Cerconota eriacma is a moth of the family Depressariidae. It is found in Guyana.

The wingspan is about 15 mm. The forewings are light brown, tinged with violet-pinkish, more strongly towards the dorsum anteriorly. The costal edge is pale ochreous and there are dark fuscous costal spots before one-third and at the middle and three-fourths, the first small, the other two elongate. There are some scattered small groups of fuscous scales indicating the antemedian and postmedian lines and stigmata and there is an irregularly curved series of cloudy dark fuscous dots from the third costal spot to the dorsum before the tornus, sinuate beneath the costa. A marginal series of cloudy dark fuscous dots is found around the apex and termen. The hindwings are grey, strewn with dark fuscous hairscales.
