= Cerconota tridesma =

Scientific classification
- Kingdom: Animalia
- Phylum: Arthropoda
- Clade: Pancrustacea
- Class: Insecta
- Order: Lepidoptera
- Family: Depressariidae
- Genus: Cerconota
- Species: C. tridesma

Binomial name
- Cerconota tridesma Meyrick, 1915

Species of moth

Cerconota tridesma is a moth in the family Depressariidae. It was described by Edward Meyrick in 1915. It is found in Guyana.

The wingspan is about 22 mm. The forewings are fuscous, with a slight purplish tinge and three light greyish-ochreous lines crossing the wing, the first at two-fifths, bent near the costa, closely preceded by a light greyish-ochreous fascia narrow on the costa and gradually dilating downwards, the second and third bent above the middle, the third running to the tornus, a light greyish-ochreous patch extending along the costa from the second to the apex. The hindwings are grey.
