= Cerconota atricassis =

Scientific classification
- Kingdom: Animalia
- Phylum: Arthropoda
- Clade: Pancrustacea
- Class: Insecta
- Order: Lepidoptera
- Family: Depressariidae
- Genus: Cerconota
- Species: C. atricassis

Binomial name
- Cerconota atricassis (Meyrick, 1916)

Synonyms
- Stenoma atricassis Meyrick, 1916

Species of moth

Cerconota atricassis is a moth of the family Depressariidae. It is found in French Guiana.

The wingspan is 19–20 mm. The forewings are rather light fuscous with a short blackish mark on the base of the dorsum. The stigmata are faintly darker, the plical obliquely beyond the first discal and there are three faintly darker hardly perceptible rather oblique curved slender lines, the third from three-fourths of the costa to the tornus. The hindwings are rather dark grey, lighter anteriorly.
