= Cerconota acajuti =

Scientific classification
- Kingdom: Animalia
- Phylum: Arthropoda
- Clade: Pancrustacea
- Class: Insecta
- Order: Lepidoptera
- Family: Depressariidae
- Genus: Cerconota
- Species: C. acajuti

Binomial name
- Cerconota acajuti Becker, 1971

Species of moth

Cerconota acajuti is a moth in the family Depressariidae. It was described by Becker in 1971. It is found in Brazil.
