= Cerconota tholodes =

Scientific classification
- Kingdom: Animalia
- Phylum: Arthropoda
- Clade: Pancrustacea
- Class: Insecta
- Order: Lepidoptera
- Family: Depressariidae
- Genus: Cerconota
- Species: C. tholodes

Binomial name
- Cerconota tholodes (Meyrick, 1915)

Synonyms
- Stenoma tholodes Meyrick, 1915

Species of moth

Cerconota tholodes is a moth of the family Depressariidae. It is found in Guyana.

The wingspan is about 22 mm. The forewings are light brownish, towards the base of the costa tinged with violet-pinkish and with the costal edge pale yellowish, at the base dark fuscous. There is an undefined area of violet-fuscous suffusion occupying the anterior three-fifths of the wing except towards the costa and there are small dark violet-fuscous spots on the costa before one-third and at the middle, and a narrow flattencd-triangular spot extending from beyond the middle to five-sixths, where a series of cloudy dark fuscous dots, somewhat curved in the disc, runs to the dorsum before the tornus. The terminal area beyond this is suffused with violet-fuscous and there is a series of dark fuscous marginal marks around the apex and termen, obscurely separated with pale yellowish. The hindwings are dark grey, lighter towards the base.
