= Cerconota certiorata =

Scientific classification
- Kingdom: Animalia
- Phylum: Arthropoda
- Clade: Pancrustacea
- Class: Insecta
- Order: Lepidoptera
- Family: Depressariidae
- Genus: Cerconota
- Species: C. certiorata

Binomial name
- Cerconota certiorata (Meyrick, 1932)

Synonyms
- Stenoma certiorata Meyrick, 1932

Species of moth

Cerconota certiorata is a moth in the family Depressariidae. It was described by Edward Meyrick in 1932. It is found in Brazil (Santa Catharina).
