= Cerconota censoria =

Scientific classification
- Kingdom: Animalia
- Phylum: Arthropoda
- Clade: Pancrustacea
- Class: Insecta
- Order: Lepidoptera
- Family: Depressariidae
- Genus: Cerconota
- Species: C. censoria

Binomial name
- Cerconota censoria (Meyrick, 1915)

Synonyms
- Stenoma censoria Meyrick, 1915

Species of moth

Cerconota censoria is a moth of the family Depressariidae. It is found in Guyana.

The wingspan is 20–21 mm. The forewings are fuscous with small cloudy rather dark fuscous spots on the costa beyond one-fourth and in the middle, giving rise to short indistinct rather oblique streaks, the costal edge obscurely pale between these. The plical and second discal stigmata are very small and dark fuscous and there is a cloudy rather dark fuscous line from three-fourths of the costa to the dorsum before the tornus, somewhat curved in the disc and interrupted on the veins, very faint dorsally. There is also a marginal series of blackish dots around the apex and termen. The hindwings are rather dark fuscous.
