= Cerconota inturbatella =

Scientific classification
- Kingdom: Animalia
- Phylum: Arthropoda
- Clade: Pancrustacea
- Class: Insecta
- Order: Lepidoptera
- Family: Depressariidae
- Genus: Cerconota
- Species: C. inturbatella

Binomial name
- Cerconota inturbatella (Walker, 1864)

Synonyms
- Cryptolechia inturbatella Walker, 1864; Stenoma xanthobyrsa Meyrick, 1915

Species of moth

Cerconota inturbatella is a moth of the family Depressariidae first described by Francis Walker in 1864. It is found in French Guiana, Guyana and the Brazilian state of Amazonas.

The wingspan is about 19 mm. The forewings are deep yellow ochreous, posteriorly slightly purple tinged, the costal edge deep ochreous yellow and with faint slender oblique fuscous lines from the costa at one-fourth and the middle, hardly reaching halfway across the wing, and one slightly curved from three-fourths of the costa to the dorsum before the tornus. The plical and second discal stigmata are small, fuscous and indistinct and there are seven small dark fuscous marginal dots around the apex and termen. The hindwings are dark grey.
