= Cerconota tabida =

Scientific classification
- Kingdom: Animalia
- Phylum: Arthropoda
- Clade: Pancrustacea
- Class: Insecta
- Order: Lepidoptera
- Family: Depressariidae
- Genus: Cerconota
- Species: C. tabida

Binomial name
- Cerconota tabida (Butler, 1877)

Synonyms
- Cryptolechia tabida Butler, 1877; Cryptolechia salutaris Butler, 1877; Stenoma maroni Busck, 1911; Stenoma astacopis Meyrick, 1930

Species of moth

Cerconota tabida is a moth in the family Depressariidae. It was described by Arthur Gardiner Butler in 1877. It is found in the Brazilian states of Amazonas and Pará and in the Guianas.

The wingspan is 26–29 mm. The forewings are light brownish ochreous with a slight fuscous-purplish mark on the costa at one-fourth and a broad oblique band more or less suffused brownish, the anterior edge formed by a suffused fuscous-purplish streak from the middle of the costa to one-fourth of the dorsum, the posterior by a triangular or trapezoidal fuscous-purplish blotch occupying the posterior third of the costa, within the band a pale semicircular antemedian dorsal blotch marked posteriorly by two curved suffused dark grey bars. The second discal stigma is grey or purplish, followed by a dot of pale suffusion and there is a light greyish shade running around this dot posteriorly, then continued as a distinct rather oblique grey line from beneath it to the dorsum, where it meets a curved grey line or shade from the costal blotch to the dorsum near the tornus, indented below the middle. There is also a terminal series of grey dots. The hindwings are grey, paler or ochreous whitish anteriorly.
