= Cerconota impressella =

Scientific classification
- Kingdom: Animalia
- Phylum: Arthropoda
- Clade: Pancrustacea
- Class: Insecta
- Order: Lepidoptera
- Family: Depressariidae
- Genus: Cerconota
- Species: C. impressella

Binomial name
- Cerconota impressella (Walker, 1864)

Synonyms
- Cryptolechia impressella Walker, 1864; Agriophara prasoleuca Meyrick, 1916

Species of moth

Cerconota impressella is a moth of the family Depressariidae. It is found in Brazil (Para), Peru, and the Guianas.

The wingspan is 23–25 mm. The forewings are purplish- or reddish-brown, mixed with paler and darker and with a broad whitish-greenish streak along the costa from the base to two-thirds, sprinkled with purplish-fuscous, and becoming clear white on the costa, with a short blackish mark on the costa near the base and elongate blackish marks at one-fourth and the middle. The posterior third of the costa is dark fuscous, marked with two or three pale dots and the discal stigmata are indistinctly white and cloudy, connected by a blackish line more or less extended to the subterminal line. There is also a curved dentate interrupted dark fuscous subterminal line, as well as a suffused dark fuscous terminal line marked with ochreous-whitish dots. The hindwings are dark grey.
