= Cerconota obsordescens =

Scientific classification
- Kingdom: Animalia
- Phylum: Arthropoda
- Clade: Pancrustacea
- Class: Insecta
- Order: Lepidoptera
- Family: Depressariidae
- Genus: Cerconota
- Species: C. obsordescens

Binomial name
- Cerconota obsordescens (Meyrick, 1930)

Synonyms
- Pomphocrita obsordescens Meyrick, 1930

Species of moth

Cerconota obsordescens is a moth in the family Depressariidae. It was described by Edward Meyrick in 1930. It is found in Brazil (Para).
