= Cerconota dryoscia =

Scientific classification
- Kingdom: Animalia
- Phylum: Arthropoda
- Clade: Pancrustacea
- Class: Insecta
- Order: Lepidoptera
- Family: Depressariidae
- Genus: Cerconota
- Species: C. dryoscia

Binomial name
- Cerconota dryoscia (Meyrick, 1932)

Synonyms
- Stenoma dryoscia Meyrick, 1932

Species of moth

Cerconota dryoscia is a moth in the family Depressariidae. It was described by Edward Meyrick in 1932. It is found in Mexico.
