= Cerconota emma =

Scientific classification
- Kingdom: Animalia
- Phylum: Arthropoda
- Clade: Pancrustacea
- Class: Insecta
- Order: Lepidoptera
- Family: Depressariidae
- Genus: Cerconota
- Species: C. emma

Binomial name
- Cerconota emma (Busck, 1911)

Synonyms
- Gonioterma emma Busck, 1911; Stenoma physotricha Meyrick, 1915

Species of moth

Cerconota emma is a moth of the family Depressariidae. It is found in French Guiana and Venezuela.

The wingspan is about 23 mm. The forewings are light ochreous-brownish with the stigmata dark fuscous, the plical very obliquely beyond the first discal and with a flattened-triangular fuscous spot on the costa at four-fifths, where a curved series of elongate dark fuscous dots, indented beneath the costa, runs to the dorsum before the tornus. The hindwings are grey, darker towards the apex. The forewings beneath have a dense expansible fringe of very long pale ochreous hairs along vein 1c from the base to the middle of the wing.
