= Cerconota carbonifer =

Scientific classification
- Kingdom: Animalia
- Phylum: Arthropoda
- Clade: Pancrustacea
- Class: Insecta
- Order: Lepidoptera
- Family: Depressariidae
- Genus: Cerconota
- Species: C. carbonifer

Binomial name
- Cerconota carbonifer (Busck, 1914)

Synonyms
- Stenoma carbonifer Busck, 1914

Species of moth

Cerconota carbonifer is a moth in the family Depressariidae. It was described by August Busck in 1914. It is found in Panama, Costa Rica and French Guiana.

The wingspan is 19–23 mm. The forewings are light ochreous clouded with brown, with a large, dorsal, evenly rounded patch of black scales, at base of which some are more or less erect. Above and bordering this black space is a small patch of brown scales and there are three dark brown costal spots, one at the basal third, one on the middle, and one at the apical fourth, from the latter starts an indistinct, outwardly curved, row of small brown dots across the wing to the termen and there is a faint row of brown marginal dots along the terminal edge, as well as a small black dot at the end of the cell. The hindwings are light yellowish fuscous.
