= Cerconota aphanes =

Scientific classification
- Kingdom: Animalia
- Phylum: Arthropoda
- Clade: Pancrustacea
- Class: Insecta
- Order: Lepidoptera
- Family: Depressariidae
- Genus: Cerconota
- Species: C. aphanes

Binomial name
- Cerconota aphanes (Walsingham, 1912)

Synonyms
- Stenoma aphanes Walsingham, 1912

Species of moth

Cerconota aphanes is a moth in the family Depressariidae. It was described by Lord Walsingham in 1912. It is found in Panama.

The wingspan is about 21 mm. The forewings are lilac-grey, the costa narrowly ochreous throughout, with three waved transverse brownish lines: the first, at about one-fourth, descending obliquely from the costa to the dorsum before the middle—before this, at the flexus, is a patch of long rather raised scales of the ground colour. The second, from beyond the middle of the costa, passing the end of the cell and almost coalescing with the recurved lower extremity of the third on the dorsum before the tornus. A few whitish grey scales mark the inner margins of these two by being a little paler than the lilac-grey ground colour, similar scales preceding each of a series of brownish marginal spots on the apex and termen. The hindwings are dull brownish grey.
