= Cerconota seducta =

Scientific classification
- Kingdom: Animalia
- Phylum: Arthropoda
- Clade: Pancrustacea
- Class: Insecta
- Order: Lepidoptera
- Family: Depressariidae
- Genus: Cerconota
- Species: C. seducta

Binomial name
- Cerconota seducta (Meyrick, 1918)

Synonyms
- Stenoma seducta Meyrick, 1918

Species of moth

Cerconota seducta is a moth in the family Depressariidae. It was described by Edward Meyrick in 1918. It is found in French Guiana.

The wingspan is about 17 mm. The forewings are fuscous-whitish or whitish-fuscous, somewhat sprinkled fuscous irregularly. There are three cloudy fuscous transverse lines, somewhat thickened on the costa, obscurely white-edged anteriorly, the first at one-third, straight, almost direct, the second from the middle of the costa, straight, rather oblique, the second discal stigma forming a small darker mark on it, the third from three-fourths of the costa, indented beneath the costa, then curved to the dorsum before the tornus. A marginal series of blackish dots is found around the apical part of the costa and termen, surrounded with white suffusion. The hindwings are light grey.
