= Cerconota figularis =

Scientific classification
- Kingdom: Animalia
- Phylum: Arthropoda
- Clade: Pancrustacea
- Class: Insecta
- Order: Lepidoptera
- Family: Depressariidae
- Genus: Cerconota
- Species: C. figularis

Binomial name
- Cerconota figularis (Meyrick, 1918)

Synonyms
- Stenoma figularis Meyrick, 1918

Species of moth

Cerconota figularis is a moth in the family Depressariidae. It was described by Edward Meyrick in 1918. It is found in French Guiana and Colombia.

The wingspan is about 17 mm. The forewings are grey-whitish with the extreme costal edge white and with three irregular oblique dark fuscous marks from the costa between the base and the middle. There are triangular dark fuscous spots on the costa at the middle and four-fifths, becoming brownish beneath. A large irregular edged pinkish-brown patch extends on the dorsum from the base to beyond the middle and reaches more than half across the wing, with a broad quadrate lobe almost reaching the median costal spot, a small round whitish spot in the middle of the dorsal edge of this. The second discal stigma is dark fuscous and there is an irregular curved light pinkish-brown line from the median costal spot to the dorsum at three-fourths, enlarged in the disc into an irregular blotch. There is also a curved line of cloudy light brown dots from the posterior costal spot to the dorsum before the tornus and a terminal series of ten blackish dots. The hindwings are rather dark grey.
