= Cerconota lutulenta =

Scientific classification
- Kingdom: Animalia
- Phylum: Arthropoda
- Clade: Pancrustacea
- Class: Insecta
- Order: Lepidoptera
- Family: Depressariidae
- Genus: Cerconota
- Species: C. lutulenta

Binomial name
- Cerconota lutulenta (Zeller, 1877)

Synonyms
- Cryptolechia lutulenta Zeller, 1877

Species of moth

Cerconota lutulenta is a moth in the family Depressariidae. It was described by Philipp Christoph Zeller in 1877. It is found in South America (Brazil) and Central America.
