= Cerconota phaeophanes =

Scientific classification
- Kingdom: Animalia
- Phylum: Arthropoda
- Clade: Pancrustacea
- Class: Insecta
- Order: Lepidoptera
- Family: Depressariidae
- Genus: Cerconota
- Species: C. phaeophanes

Binomial name
- Cerconota phaeophanes (Meyrick, 1912)

Synonyms
- Stenoma phaeophanes Meyrick, 1912

Species of moth

Cerconota phaeophanes is a moth of the family Depressariidae. It is found in Colombia.

The wingspan is 24–27 mm. The forewings are bronzy-fuscous with three very faint darker transverse lines, the first two hardly curved, the first from one-fourth of the costa to the middle of the dorsum, the second from the middle of the costa to three-fourths of the dorsum, the third irregularly curved from three-fourths of the costa to the dorsum before the tornus. The second discal stigma is dark fuscous and located on the second line. The hindwings are dark fuscous.
