= Cerconota nimbosa =

Scientific classification
- Kingdom: Animalia
- Phylum: Arthropoda
- Clade: Pancrustacea
- Class: Insecta
- Order: Lepidoptera
- Family: Depressariidae
- Genus: Cerconota
- Species: C. nimbosa

Binomial name
- Cerconota nimbosa (Zeller, 1877)

Synonyms
- Cryptolechia nimbosa Zeller, 1877; Stenoma vanis Busck, 1911; Gonioterma bythochroa Meyrick, 1915

Species of moth

Cerconota nimbosa is a moth in the family Depressariidae. It was described by Philipp Christoph Zeller in 1877. It is found in Peru and the Guianas.

The wingspan is about 29 mm. The forewings are purple-greyish-ochreous, with suffused purple markings and a very oblique parallel fasciae from the costa at one-fourth and the middle, the second running to the tornus, with broad undefined median and dorsal streaks from the base to the second confluent anteriorly. There is some elongate brownish suffusion in the middle of the disc and an elongate spot on the costa towards the apex, as well as a dark brown streak along the termen. The hindwings are dark grey.
