= Cerconota hexascia =

Scientific classification
- Kingdom: Animalia
- Phylum: Arthropoda
- Clade: Pancrustacea
- Class: Insecta
- Order: Lepidoptera
- Family: Depressariidae
- Genus: Cerconota
- Species: C. hexascia

Binomial name
- Cerconota hexascia (Meyrick, 1925)

Synonyms
- Stenoma hexascia Meyrick, 1925

Species of moth

Cerconota hexascia is a moth of the family Depressariidae. It is found in Brazil (Amazonas).

The wingspan is about 15 mm. The forewings are white with five small suffused blackish-grey costal spots, the first slightly marked, basal, the fifth at four-fifths, the first three and fifth giving rise to cloudy suffused greyish-ochreous transverse fasciae, the fifth running to the tornus, the fourth to two similar fasciae confluent beneath the costa with third and fifth also, between these two second discal stigma transverse, blackish, the plical indicated by one or two blackish scales. Beyond the fifth are two blackish costal dots, around the apex and upper part of the termen a greyish-bronzy line. The hindwings are pale greyish.
