= List of Brazilian fruits =

This is a list of edible fruits that are native to, acclimatized to, or widely cultivated in Brazil:

== List of Brazilian fruits ==
- Acanthosyris spinescens (sombra-de-touro)
- Acrocomia aculeata (coyol, macaúaba)
- Aiphanes aculeata (pujamo)
- Alibertia edulis (marmelada-de-cavalo)
- Allagoptera arenaria (guriri)
- Ambelania acida (pepino-do-mato)
- Anacardium giganteum (cajuí)
- Anacardium humile (caju-anão)
- Anacardium microcarpum (caju, cashew)
- Anacardium occidentale
- Ananas comosus (abacaxi, pineapple)
- Annona cacans (araticum-cagão)
- Annona coriacea (fruta-do-conde)
- Annona crassiflora (marolo)
- Annona glabra (corkwood, bobwood)
- Annona montana (mountain soursop)
- Annona salzmannii (annona, beach sugar apple)
- Astrocaryum aculeatum (tucuma)
- Astrocaryum vulgare (tucum, awarra)
- Astrocaryum (murumuru)
- Attalea dubia (indaiá)
- Bactris ferruginea (mané-velho)
- Bactris maraja (marajá)
- Bactris setosa (tucum)
- Bellucia grossularioides (goiaba-de-anta)
- Bellucia imperialis (goiaba-de-anta-vermelha)
- Bertholletia excelsa (castanha-do-pará, Brazil nut)
- Bombacopsis glabra (castanha-do-maranhão)
- Brosimum gaudichaudii (maminha-cadela)
- Butia capitata (butiá, jelly palm, pindo palm)
- Butia eriospatha (butiá-da-serra)
- Butia odorata (butiá-da-praia)
- Butia purpurascens (butiá-jataí)
- Butia yatai (jataí, yataee)
- Byrsonima crassifolia (crabú, golden spoon, nance, kraabu)
- Byrsonima verbascifolia (murici-rasteiro)
- Campomanesia adamantium (guabiroba-amarela, guabiroba-verde)
- Campomanesia aurea (guabirobinha-do-campo)
- Campomanesia guazumifolia (sete-capotes)
- Campomanesia lineatifolia (guabiraba)
- Campomanesia neriiflora (guabiroba-branca)
- Campomanesia phaea (cambucí)
- Campomanesia pubescens (guabiroba-peluda)
- Campomanesia schlechtendaliana (guabiroba-rugosa)
- Campomanesia sessiliflora (guabiroba-verde)
- Campomanesia xanthocarpa var. litoralis (guabiroba-da-praia)
- Campomanesia xanthocarpa (guabiroba)
- Cariocar coriaceum (pequiá, piquiá)
- Caryocar brasiliensis (souari nut, pequi)
- Caryocar microcarpum (pequiarana)
- Caryocar villosum (pequiá, piquiá)
- Casearia decandra (cambroé)
- Casearia rupestris (pururuca)
- Cassia leiandra (mari-mari)
- Celtis iguanaea (jamerí)
- Cereus jamacaru (mandacarú)
- Cheilochlinium cognatum (uarutama)
- Chondodendron platyphyllum (jaboticaba-de-cipó)
- Chrysobalanus icaco (ajurú, cocoplum)
- Cocos nucifera (coco, coconut)
- Cordiera elliptica (marmelada-de-pinto)
- Cordiera humilis (marmelada-rasteira)
- Cordiera sessilis (marmelada-de-cachorro)
- Couepia bracteosa (pajurá)
- Couepia longipendula (chicken-nut, egg nut, pendula nut)
- Couepia subcordata (umarirana)
- Couma utilis (sorvinha)
- Crataeva tapia (tapia)
- Dicella nucifera (castanha-de-cipó)
- Diospyros brasiliensis (bull's eye)
- Diospyros hispida (caqui-do-cerrado)
- Diospyros inconstans (marmelinho)
- Dipteryx alata (baru, cumbaru, cumbaru)
- Duguetia furfuracea (marolinho-do-cerrado)
- Duguetia lanceolada (pindaíva)
- Endopleura uchi (uxí)
- Eugenia brasiliensis (gumixama, grumichama)
- Eugenia calycina (cerejinha, savannah cherry)
- Eugenia candolleana (murtinha, cambuí-roxo, rainforest plum)
- Eugenia copacabanensis (cambuí-amarelo)
- Eugenia dysenterica (cagaita)
- Eugenia florida (guamirim cereja, rainforest cherry)
- Eugenia involucrata (cereja-do-rio-grande, Rio Grande cherry)
- Eugenia itaguahiensis (grumixama-mirim)
- Eugenia klotzschiana (pêra-do-campo)
- Eugenia leitonii (goiabão)
- Eugenia luschnathiana (pitomba-da-bahia, curuiri)
- Eugenia lutescens (perinha)
- Eugenia multicostata (pau-alazão)
- Eugenia myrcianthes (pêssego-do-mato)
- Eugenia patrisii (ubaia)
- Eugenia pitanga (pitanga-do-cerrado)
- Eugenia pyriformis (uvaia-piriforme, uvaia-redonda, uvaia-rugosa-doce)
- Eugenia selloi (pitangatuba)
- Eugenia speciosa (laranjinha-do-mato)
- Eugenia stipitata (strawberry-guava, araza, araçá-boi)
- Eugenia subterminalis (cambuí pitanga, cereja do mato verdadeira, pitanga lisa de sombra, pitanga preta, cambuízão vermelho do rio Paranapanema)
- Eugenia uniflora (pitanga, surinam cherry, cayenne cherry)
- Euterpe edulis (juçara)
- Euterpe oleracea (açaí, assaee, açaí-do-para)
- Euterpe precatoria (açaí-da-amazônia)
- Feijoa sellowiana (feijoa, guavasteen)
- Fuchsia regia (brinco-de-princesa)
- Garcinia brasiliensis (bacupari-miúdo)
- Garcinia gardneriana (bacupari)
- Garcinia macrophylla (bacuripari)
- Garcinia madruno (bacuri, charichuelo)
- Gaylussacia angustifolia (camarinha-da-serra)
- Gaylussacia brasiliensis (camarinha)
- Genipa americana (hawa, jagua, huito, genipapo)
- Genipa infudibuliformis (jenipapo-liso)
- Hancornia speciosa var. pubescens (mangaba)
- Hancornia speciosa (mangaba-da-restinga)
- Hymenaea courbaril (jatobá, guapinol, Brazilian cherry)
- Hymenaea stigonocarpa (jatobá-do-cerrado)
- Inga cinnamomea (ingá-açu)
- Inga edulis (guama, guaba, ice-cream bean)
- Inga laurina (ingá-branco)
- Inga marginata (ingá-feijão)
- Inga sessilis (ingá-ferradura)
- Inga vera (ingá-banana)
- Inga vulpina (ingá-miúdo), pink-flower inga
- Jacaratia spinosa (jaracatiá)
- Lecythis lanceolata (sapucaia-mirim)
- Lecythis pisonis (sapucaia, cream nut)
- Licania salzmannii (oití-da-bahia)
- Maclura tinctoria (taiúva, dyer's mulberry)
- Manilkara huberi (maçaranduba)
- Manilkara salzmannii (maçaranduba-preta)
- Manilkara subsericea (maçaranduba)
- Mauritia flexuosa (burití, moriche, ita, ité, aguaje)
- Maximiliana maripa (inajá)
- Melancium campestre (melancia-do-campo)
- Mouriri pusa (puçá)
- Myrcianthes pungens (guabiju)
- Myrciaria cuspidata (camboim, cambuím)
- Myrciaria delicatula (cambuí uvaia doce, cambuí graudo, cambuím, cambu branco)
- Myrciaria dubia (camu-camu, caçari, camocamo)
- Myrciaria floribunda (camboim, rumberry)
- Myrciaria glazioviana (cabeludinha)
- Myrciaria glomerata (cabeludinha vermelha, cabeluda escarlate)
- Myrciaria guaquiea (guaquica, ibá-cuíca)
- Myrciaria pilosa (cambucá do sertão)
- Myrciaria strigipes (cambucá da praia)
- Myrciaria tenella (camboim)
- Oenocarpus bacaba (bacaba, bacaba-açu, camon, manoco, punama)
- Oenocarpus bataua (pataua, patawa, sehe)
- Oenocarpus distichus (bacaba-de-leque)
- Opuntia paraguayensis (arumbeva)
- Orbignya phalerata (babaçú, babassu, cusi)
- Pachira aquatica (monguba, saba nut, malabar chestnut)
- Parinari obtusifolia (fruta-de-ema)
- Passiflora alata (wild passionfruit, yellow passionfruit, melon passionfruit)
- Passiflora ambigua (maracujá-doce)
- Passiflora amethystina (maracujá-de-cobra)
- Passiflora caerulea (maracujá-azul, blue passionfruit)
- Passiflora cincinnata (maracujá-mochila)
- Passiflora coccinea (maracujá-poranga)
- Passiflora edulis (maracujá, passionfruit)
- Passiflora eichleriana (maracujá-de-cobra)
- Passiflora elegans (maracujá-de-estalo)
- Passiflora foetida (wild water lemon, wild maracujá, love-in-a-mist, running pop)
- Passiflora galbana (maracujá-do-mato)
- Passiflora giberti (maracujá-bravo)
- Passiflora laurifolia (water lemon)
- Passiflora loefgreenii (maracujá-de-alho)
- Passiflora mucronata (maracujá-de-restinga)
- Passiflora nitida (bell apple)
- Passiflora picturata (round passionfruit)
- Passiflora quadrangularis (giant tumbo)
- Passiflora serrato-digitata (maracujá-pedra)
- Passiflora setacea (maracujá-sururuca)
- Passiflora tenuiphila (maracujá-de-cobra)
- Passiflora vitifolia (grape leaf passion fruit)
- Paullinia cupana (guaraná)
- Peritassa campestris (bacupari-do-cerrado)
- Physalis pubescens (husk tomato, hairy groundcherry, camapú)
- Pilosocereus arrabidae (pitaia-da-restinga)
- Platonia insignis (bacuri, bacuri-açu)
- Plinia cauliflora (jaboticaba-paulista, jaboticaba-ponhema, jaboticaba-precoce, jaboticaba-vermelha)
- Myrciaria coronata (jaboticaba-coroada)
- Plinia edulis (jaboticaba-cambuca)
- Myrciaria grandifolia (jaboticaba-graúda)
- Plinia inflata (mulchi, cambucá equatoriano)
- Plinia martinellii (jabuticabinha da mata)
- Myrciaria oblongata (jaboticaba polpa-rosada)
- Myrciaria phitrantha (jaboticaba-costada), (jaboticaba-branca)
- Myrciaria trunciflora (jaboticaba-de-cabinho)
- Plinia rivularis (guaburiti)
- Plinia spirito-santensis (jabuticaba peluda de cruz)
- Poraqueiba sericea (umari)
- Porcelia macrocarpa (banana-de-macaco)
- Posoqueria latifolia (baga-de-macaco)
- Pourouma cecropiifolia (mapati, Amazon grape)
- Pouteria bullata (guapeva-vermelha)
- Pouteria caimito (abiu-ticúna)
- Pouteria gardneriana (aguaí-guaçu)
- Pouteria gardnerii (sapotinha)
- Pouteria grandiflora (bapeba-da-restinga)
- Pouteria macrophylla (cutite)
- Pouteria pachycalyx (cutite-da-restinga)
- Pouteria ramiflora (curiola)
- Pouteria torta (abiurana)
- Pouteria venosa (bapeba-pessego)
- Pradosia brevipes (fruto-de-tatu)
- Pradosia lactescens (marmixa)
- Psidium acutangulum (araçá-pêra)
- Psidium cattleyanum (cattley guava, strawberry guava)
- Psidium cinereum (grey araça)
- Psidium firmum (araçá-do-cerrado)
- Psidium guajava (goiaba-yonemura, goiaba-amarela, goiaba-cascuda)
- Psidium guajava var. minor (goiaba-miniatura)
- Psidium guineense (araçá-do-campo)
- Psidium rufum (araçá-roxo)
- Psidium salutare (araçá-rasteiro)
- Quararibea cordata (sapota, sapote)
- Rhamnidium elaeocarpus (saguaraji)
- Rollinia emarginata (araticum-mirim)
- Rollinia mucosa, Rollinia deliciosa (biriba)
- Rollinia salicifolia (cortiça-lisa)
- Rollinia sericea (cortiça)
- Rollinia sylvatica (cortiça)
- Rubus erythrocladus (amora-verde)
- Rubus rosifolius (thimbleberry)
- Rubus sellowii (amora-preto-vermelha)
- Salacia elliptica (siputá)
- Scheelea butyracea (jaci)
- Scheelea phalerata (bacuri)
- Sicana odorifera (cassabanana, musk cucumber)
- Sideroxylon obtusifolium (sapotiaba)
- Solanum sessiliflorum (cubiu, cocona)
- Spondias macrocarpa (cajá-redondo)
- Spondias mombin (golden apple, gully plum, coolie plum, java plum, jobo, yellow mombin)
- Spondias sp. (umbu-cajá)
- Spondias tuberosa (umbú, Brazil plum)
- Spondias venulosa (cajá-grande)
- Sterculia apetala (mandovi)
- Sterculia striata (chicá-do-cerrado)
- Syagrus cearensis (catolé)
- Syagrus coronata (licuri)
- Syagrus flexuosa (acumã)
- Syagrus macrocarpa (marirosa)
- Syagrus oleracea (guariroba)
- Syagrus romanzoffiana (jeriva)
- Syagrus schyzophylla (aricuriroba)
- Syagrus vagans (ariri)
- Talisia esculenta (pitomba)
- Theobroma bicolor (pataste)
- Theobroma cacao (cacau, cocoa)
- Theobroma grandiflora (cupuaçu)
- Theobroma speciosum (cacauí)
- Theobroma subincanum (cupuí)
- Tontellea micrantha (bacupari)
- Vasconcella quercifolia (mamãozinho-do-mato)
- Vitex cymosa (jaramantaia)
- Vitex montevidensis (tarumã)
- Vitex polygama (tarumã-do-cerrado)
- Xymenia americana (limãozinho-da-praia)
- Zizyphus joazeiro (juazeiro, joá)
- Zizyphus mistol (mistol)

== List of edible fruits in Amazonia ==
List of edible fruits in Amazonia (Resque 2007):

This list is of edible fruits that are native to, acclimatized to, or widely cultivated in Amazonia, the state of Brazil in which the Amazon Rainforest is found.

- Acrocomia sclerocarpa (mucajá, grugru palm, gloo gloo, corojo, macaúba palm, coyol palm, macaw palm)
- Alibertia edulis (puruí, goiaba-preta, marmelada-de-cavalo, guayabita del pinar, wilde guave, guava)
- Allantoma lineata (seru, castanha-da-serra, ripeiro-cheru, tauari)
- Ambelania acida (pepino-do-mato)
- Anacardium giganteum (cajuí, marañón, caja acu, cashew, giant cashew)
- Anacardium microcarpum (caju-do-campo, marañón, miniature cashew)
- Anacardium negrense (cajutim, marañón, cashew)
- Anacardium occidentale (caju, marañón, cashew)
- Ananas comosus (abacaxi, pineapple)
- Annona densicoma (araticum-do-mato)
- Annona montana (araticum, mountain soursop, mountain sop, wild soursop)
- Annona muricata (graviola, soursop)
- Annona squamosa (ata, sugar apple, sweetsop, custard apple)
- Arachis hypogaea (amendoim, groundnut, goober, goober pea, pindar, monkey nut, peanut)
- Ardisia panurensis (cururureçá)
- Artocarpus altilis (fruta-pão, breadfruit)
- Artocarpus heterophyllus (jaca, jackfruit, jakfruit, nangka)
- Astrocaryum aculeatum (tucumã-do-amazonas)
- Astrocaryum vulgare (tucumã)
- Attalea maripa (inajá, maripa palm)
- Averrhoa bilimbi (limão-de-caiena)
- Averrhoa carambola (carambola, five-corner, starfruit)
- Bactris gasipaes (pupunha)
- Bactris maraja (marajá)
- Bagassa guianensis (tatajuba, cow wood)
- Bellucia grossularioides (araçá-de-anta)
- Bertholletia excelsa (castanha-do-pará, Brazil nut)
- Bonafousia longituba (paiuetu)
- Borojoa sorbilis (puruí-grande)
- Bunchosia armeniaca (caferana, ciruela silvestre, ciruela de cansaboca, green plum, forest plum, monk's plum, friar's plum, cold-earth mamey, peanut-butter fruit)
- Byrsonima amazonica (muruci-vermelho, muruci tree, nance, red muruci)
- Byrsonima crassifolia (muruci, hogberry, golden spoon, nance, maricao, cimun, craboo)
- Byrsonima crispa (muruci-da-mata, forest muruci)
- Byrsonima lancifolia (muruci-da-capoeira)
- Byrsonima verbascifolia (muruci-rasteiro)
- Campomanesia lineatifolia (guabiraba, perfume guava)
- Carica papaya (mamão, papaya)
- Caryocar villosum (piquiá)
- Caryodendron amazonicum (castanha-de-porco, pork nut)
- Cassia leiandra (marimari, mari-mari)
- Cheiloclinium cognatum (uarutama)
- Chrysobalanus icaco (ajuru, paradise plum, cocoplum)
- Chrysophyllum cainito (camitié)
- Citrullus lanatus (melancia, watermelon)
- Couepia bracteosa (pajurá)
- Couepia edulis (castanha-de-cutia)
- Couepia longipendula (castanha-de-galinha)
- Couepia paraensis (pirauxi)
- Couepia subcordata (umari-rana)
- Couma guianensis (sorva)
- Couma macrocarpa (sorva-grande, avichure, leche caspi, leche huayo, cow tree)
- Couma utilis (sorvinha, sorva, sorva-pequena, sorveira, milk tree)
- Cucumis melo (melão, melon, true melon)
- Duckesia verrucosa (uxi-curuá)
- Duguetia marcgraviana (pindaeua)
- Duguetia stenantha (jaboti)
- Duroia macrophylla (cabeça-de-urubu)
- Duroia saccifera (puruí-da-mata)
- Ecclinusa guianensis (guajaraí)
- Elaeis oleifera (dendê-do-pará)
- Endopleura uchi (uxí)
- Erisma japura (japurá)
- Eugenia brasiliensis (gumixama, grumichama)
- Eugenia patrisii (ubaia)
- Eugenia stipitata (araçá-boi)
- Eugenia uniflora (pitanga)
- Euterpe oleracea (açaí)
- Flacourtia jangomas (ameixa-de-madagascar)
- Fusaea longifolia (fusaia)
- Genipa americana (hawa, jagua, huito, genipapo)
- Gnetum spp. (ituá)
- Hancornia speciosa (mangaba, mangaba-da-restinga)
- Helicostylis tomentosa (inharé)
- Humiria balsamifera (umiri)
- Hymenaea courbaril (jatobá, guapinol, Brazilian cherry)
- Inga alba (ingá-turi)
- Inga capitata (ingá-costela)
- Inga cinnamomea (ingá-açú)
- Inga edulis (ingá-cipó)
- Inga fagifolia (ingá-cururu)
- Inga heterophylla (ingá-xixica)
- Inga macrophylla (ingá-péua)
- Inga velutina (ingá-de-fogo)
- Jacaratia spinosa (jaracatiá)
- Labatia macrocarpa (cabeça-de-macaco)
- Lacmellea arborescens (tucujá)
- Lacunaria jenmani (moela-de-mutum)
- Lecythis pisonis (sapucaia, cream nut, monkey pot)
- Licania tomentosa (oiti)
- Malpighia emarginata (acerola, wild crepe myrtle, Guarani cherry, Barbados cherry, cerise)
- Mammea americana (abricó, mammee apple, yellow mamey, South American apricot)
- Mangifera indica (manga, mango)
- Manilkara huberi (maçaranduba)
- Manilkara zapota (sapoti)
- Mauritia flexuosa (burití, moriche, ita, ité, aguaje, moriche palm)
- Mauritiella armata (caraná)
- Melicoccus bijugatus (pitomba-das-guianas)
- Micropholis acutangula (abiu-carambola)
- Mouriri apiranga (apiranga)
- Mouriri eugeniifolia (dauicu)
- Mouriri ficoides (muriri, mururi)
- Mouriri grandiflora (camutim)
- Mouriri guianensis (gurguri)
- Mouriri pusa (puçá)
- Mouriri trunciflora (mirauba)
- Moutabea chodatiana (gogó-de-guariba)
- Musa x paradisiaca (banana)
- Myrcia fallax (frutinheira)
- Myrciaria dubia (camu-camu, caçari, camocamo)
- Neoxythece caimito (abiu)
- Neoxythece elegans (caramuri)
- Oenocarpus bacaba (bacaba, bacaba-açu, camon, manoco, punama)
- Oenocarpus bataua (patauá, patawa, sehe)
- Oenocarpus distichus (bacaba-de-leque)
- Oenocarpus mapora (bacabinha)
- Oenocarpus minor (bacabi)
- Pachira aquatica (mamorana, monguba, saba nut, malabar chestnut)
- Parahancornia amapa (amapá)
- Parinari montana (pajurá-da-mata)
- Parinari sprucei (uará)
- Passiflora edulis (maracujá, passionfruit)
- Passiflora nitida (maracujá-suspiro, bell apple)
- Passiflora quadrangularis (maracujá-açu, giant tumbo)
- Paullinia cupana (guaraná)
- Peritassa campestris (gulosa, bacupari-do-cerrado)
- Peritassa laevigata (gulosa)
- Persea americana (abacate, avocado, avocado pear, alligator pear)
- Physalis angulata (camapu)
- Platonia insignis (bacuri, bacuri-açu)
- Poraqueiba paraensis (umari)
- Poupartia amazonica (jacaiacá)
- Pourouma cecropiifolia (mapati, Amazon grape)
- Pouteria caimito (abiu, abiu-ticúna)
- Pouteria macrocarpa (cutite-grande)
- Pouteria macrophylla (cutite)
- Pouteria pariry (pariri)
- Pouteria speciosa (pajurá-de-óbidos)
- Pouteria torta (abiurana)
- Pouteria ucuqui (ucuqui)
- Psidium acutangulum (araçá-pêra)
- Psidium guajava (goiaba, goiaba-yonemura, goiaba-amarela, goiaba-cascuda, guava, guava-pear)
- Psidium guineense (araçá-do-campo)
- Quararibea cordata (sapota-do-solimões, sapota, sapote, chupa-chupa, South American sapote)
- Quiina florida (pama)
- Rheedia acuminata (bacurizinho)
- Rheedia brasiliensis (bacuripari-liso)
- Rheedia gardneriana (bacuri-mirim)
- Rheedia macrophylla (bacuripari)
- Rollinia mucosa (biribá, lemon meringue pie fruit, wild sugar apple, rollinia, aratiku)
- Sacoglottis guianensis (achuá)
- Salacia impressifolia (uaimiratipi)
- Spondias dulcis (taperebá, Polynesian plum, Tahiti apple, golden apple, pommecythere, April plum, June plum, Jew plum, ambarella, cythere)
- Spondias mombin (taperebá, yellow mombin, hog plum, amra, cajazeira)
- Spondias purpurea (ciriguela, jocote, red mombin, Spanish plum, purple mombin, Jamaica plum, hog plum)
- Syzygium cumini (jamelão, Java plum, Malabar plum, jambolan, black plum, jamun, jambul)
- Syzygium jambos (jambo-rosa, rose apple)
- Syzygium malaccense (jambo, Malay apple, Malaysian apple, Hawaiian mountain apple)
- Syzygium samarangense (jambo-rosa, wax apple, Java apple)
- Talisia esculenta (pitomba)
- Tamarindus indica (tamarindo, tamarind, asam jawa, asam, Javanese sour fruit, sukaer, sampalok, sambag, makham)
- Theobroma bicolor (cacau-do-peru, pataste, mocambo tree, jaguar tree, balamte)
- Theobroma cacao (cacau, cocoa)
- Theobroma canumanense (cupuaçu-do-mato)
- Theobroma grandiflorum (cupuaçu, cupuassu, cupuazú, cupu assu, copoazu)
- Theobroma mariae (cacau-jacar)
- Theobroma speciosum (cacauí, cacao blanco, cacau-de-macaco, cacaoy, cacaoíllo, cacau-rana, cacao biaro, cupuyh, cacao sacha, chocolatillo)
- Theobroma subincanum (cupuí, cacao-de-monte)
- Ziziphus mauritiana (dão, ber, Indian jujube, Indian plum, Chinese apple, dunks)

== Bibliography ==
- CAVALCANTE, Paulo B. Frutas comestíveis da Amazônia. 5. ed. Belém: Edições CEJUP, 1991; CNPq/Museu Paraense Emílio Goeldi, 1991. 279 p. (Coleção Adolpho Ducke).
- GOMES, Raimundo Pimentel (1972). Fruticultura brasileira. São Paulo: Nobel. ISBN 85-213-0126-X
- LORENZI, H.; LACERDA, M. T. C.; BACHER, L. B. (2015). Frutas no Brasil: nativas e exóticas (de consumo in natura). 2a. ed. Instituto Plantarum de Estudos da Flora, São Paulo. 704 p. [1a. ed., 2006.]
- RESQUE, Olímpia Reis. 2007. Vocabulário de Frutas Comestíveis na Amazônia. Belém: Museu Paraense Emílio Goeldi – Coordenação de Informação e Documentação.

== See also ==
- Flora Brasiliensis
