= Bell apple =

Bell apple is a common name for several plants and may refer to:

- Passiflora laurifolia, a species in the family Passifloraceae native to northern South America and southern Central America
- Passiflora nitida, a species in the family Passifloraceae
- Syzygium samarangense, a species in the family Myrtaceae native to southeast Asia and widely cultivated
