= Otocinclus mangaba =

Scientific classification
- Domain: Eukaryota
- Kingdom: Animalia
- Phylum: Chordata
- Class: Actinopterygii
- Order: Siluriformes
- Family: Loricariidae
- Genus: Otocinclus
- Species: O. mangaba

Binomial name
- Otocinclus mangaba Lehmann A., Mayer & Reis, 2010

Species of catfish

Otocinclus mangaba is a species of catfish in the family Loricariidae. It is a tropical freshwater species endemic to Brazil, where it occurs in the Madeira River drainage. The species reaches 2.8 cm (1.1 inches) SL. The specific epithet of this fish derives from mangaba, the Portuguese name for the fruit of the plant Hancornia speciosa, which Humaitá, a municipality near where the species is found, is known for.
