= Red granadilla =

Red granadilla is a common name for several plants and may refer to:

- Passiflora capsularis
- Passiflora coccinea, native to northern South America
