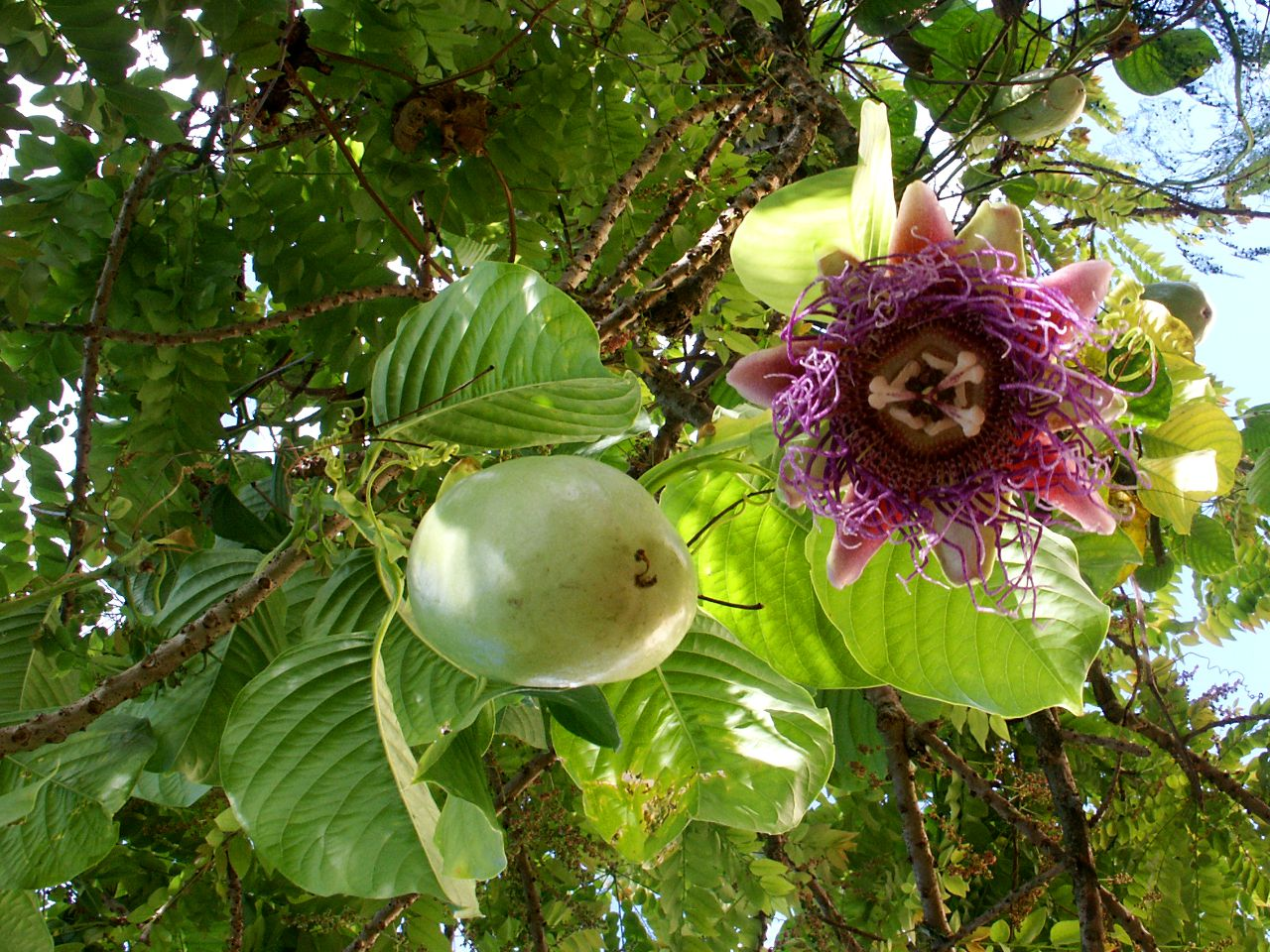

Scientific classification
- Kingdom: Plantae
- Clade: Tracheophytes
- Clade: Angiosperms
- Clade: Eudicots
- Clade: Rosids
- Order: Malpighiales
- Family: Passifloraceae
- Genus: Passiflora
- Species: P. quadrangularis

Binomial name
- Passiflora quadrangularis L.

= Passiflora quadrangularis =

Species of vine

Passiflora quadrangularis, the giant granadilla, barbadine (Trinidad), grenadine (Haiti), giant tumbo or badea (Spanish pronunciation: [baˈðe.a]), is a species of plant in the family Passifloraceae. It produces the largest fruit of any species within the genus Passiflora. It is a perennial climber native to the Neotropics.

== Description ==
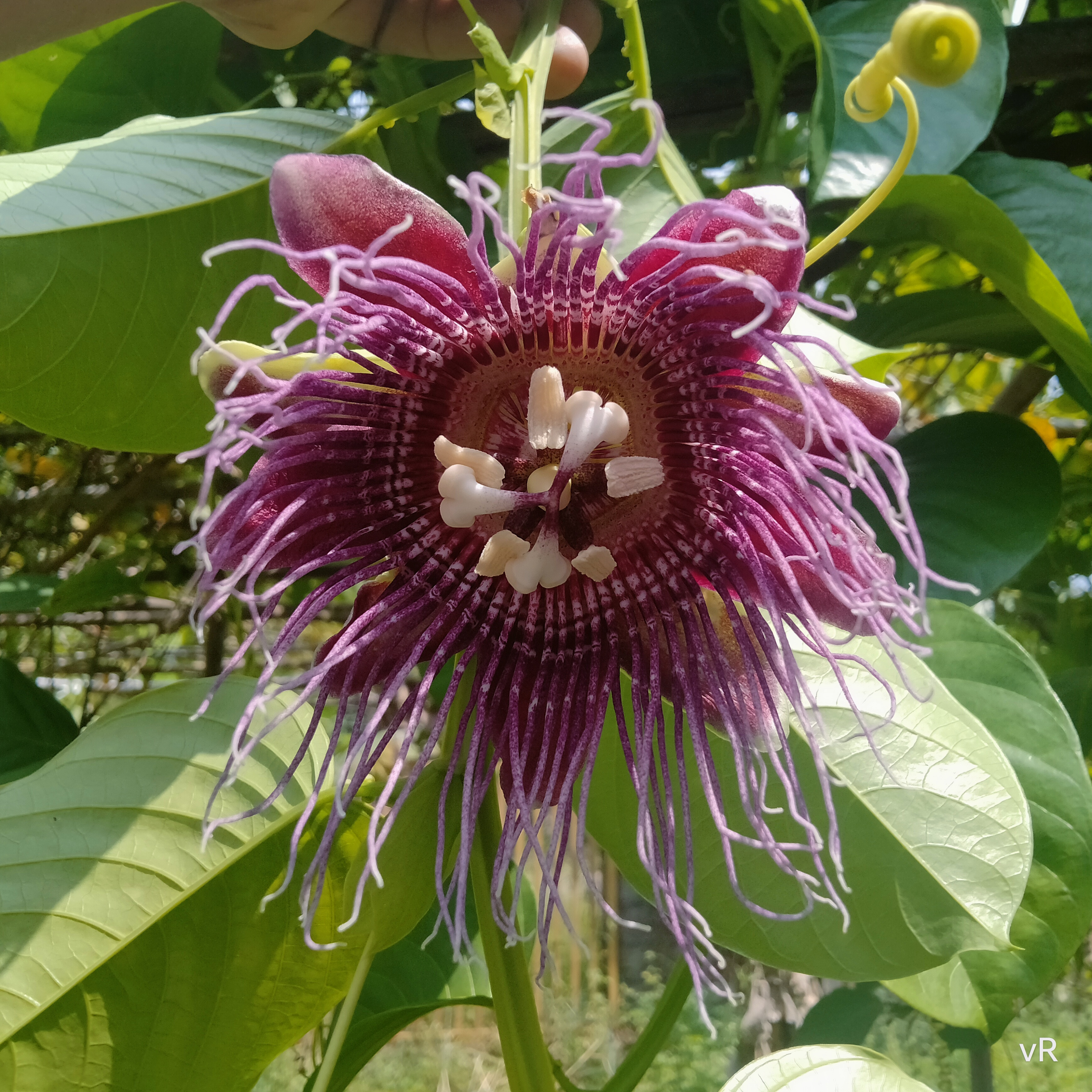
Passiflora quadrangularis flower

It is a vigorous, tender evergreen perennial climber with nodding red flowers, each surrounded by white and purple filaments. It has smooth, cordate, ovate or acuminate leaves; petioles bearing from 4 to 6 glands; an emetic and narcotic root; scented flowers; and a large, oblong fruit, up to 12 inches (30 cm) in length. containing numerous seeds, embedded in a subacid edible pulp.

== Uses ==
The badea is sometimes grown in greenhouses. The fruits of several other species of Passiflora are eaten. P. laurifolia is the water lemon and P. maliformis the sweet calabash of the West Indies.

The fruit juice of the badea is used as a beverage. In some parts of Sri Lanka the fruit, where it is known as ටං ටිං ([tʌŋ tIŋ]), රට පුහුල් or ටුං ටුං, is cooked as a vegetable curry, and the seeds are consumed as a snack or used to extract juice.

A tea is made from the leaves which is used for high blood pressure and diabetes. A drink and ice-cream are made from the fruit.

== Ornamental ==
Passiflora quadrangularis is also grown as an ornamental. Requiring a minimum temperature of 8 °C (46 °F), in temperate zones it must be grown under glass. It has gained the Royal Horticultural Society's Award of Garden Merit.

== See also ==
- Passiflora maliformis (Sweet calabash)
- Passiflora laurifolia (Water lemon)
- Passiflora foetida (Wild water lemon or stinking passion flower)

== Gallery ==
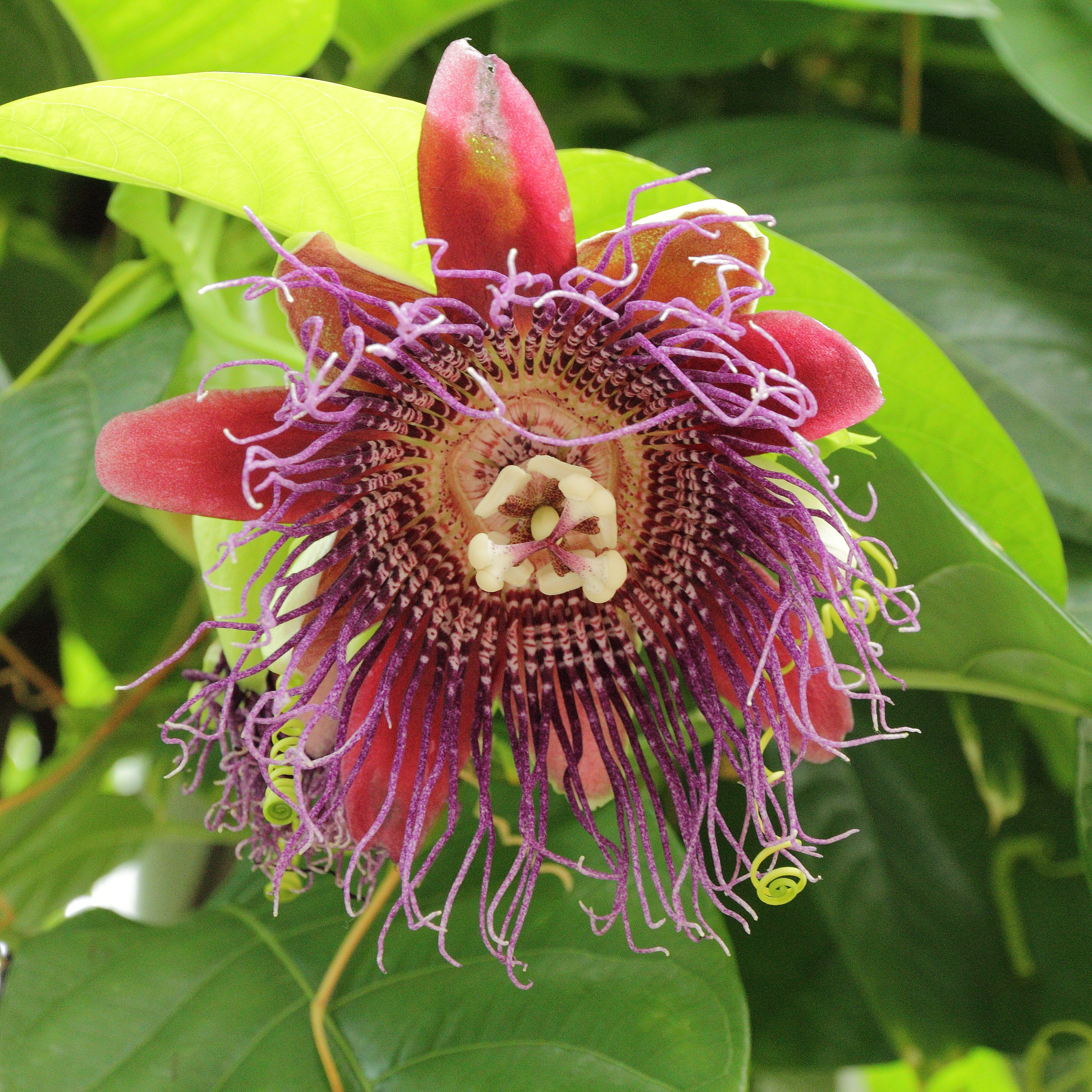

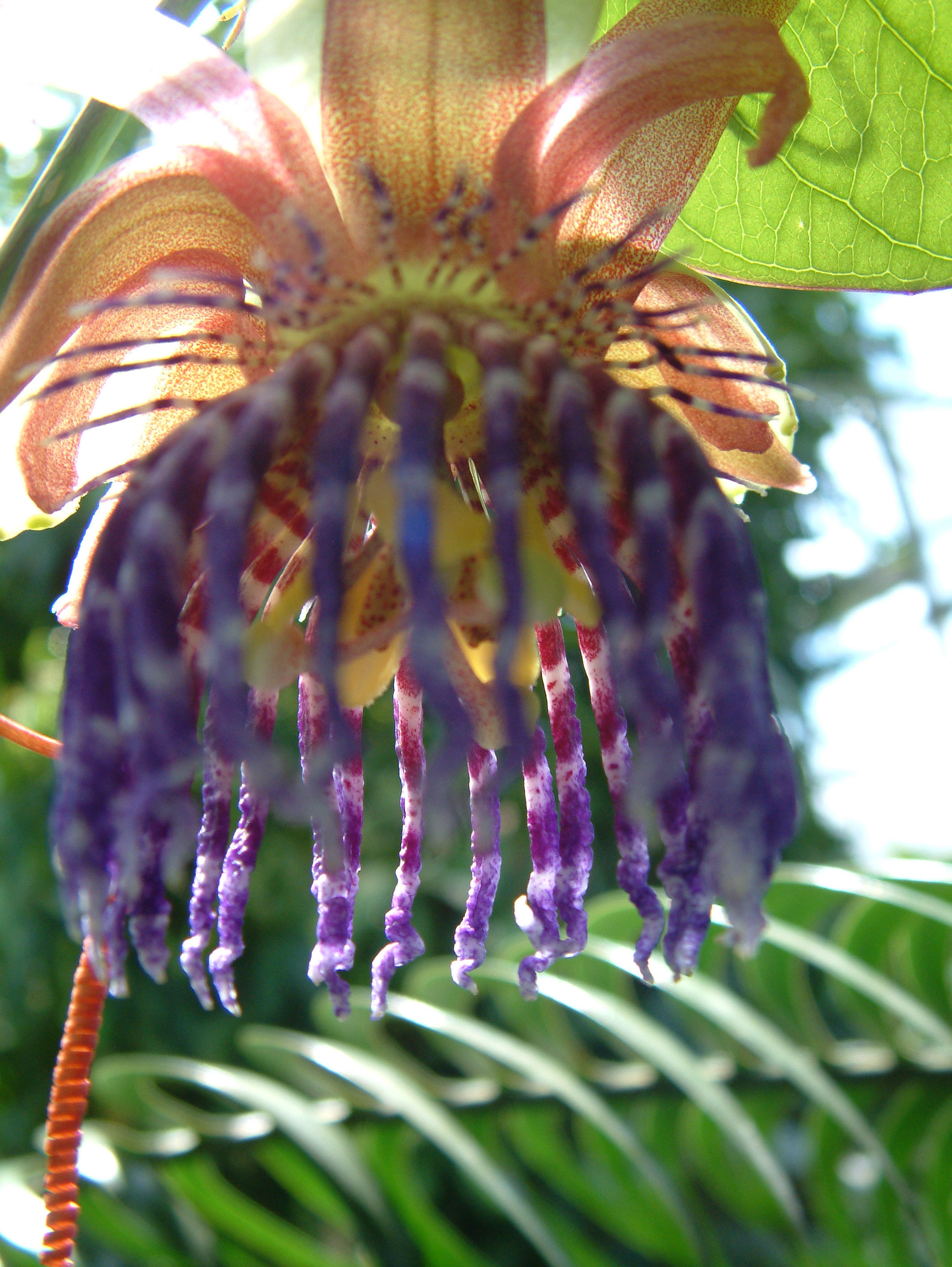

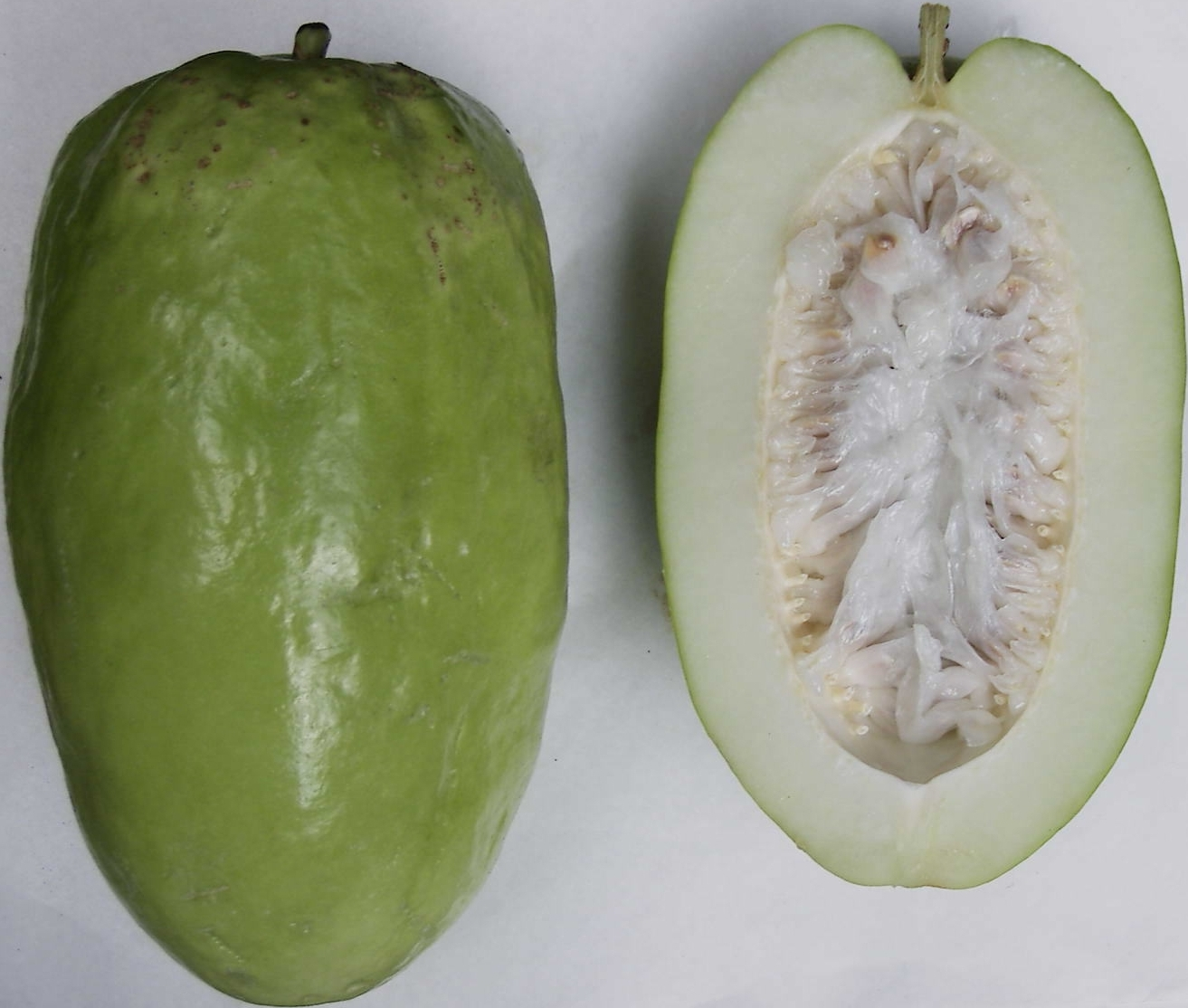

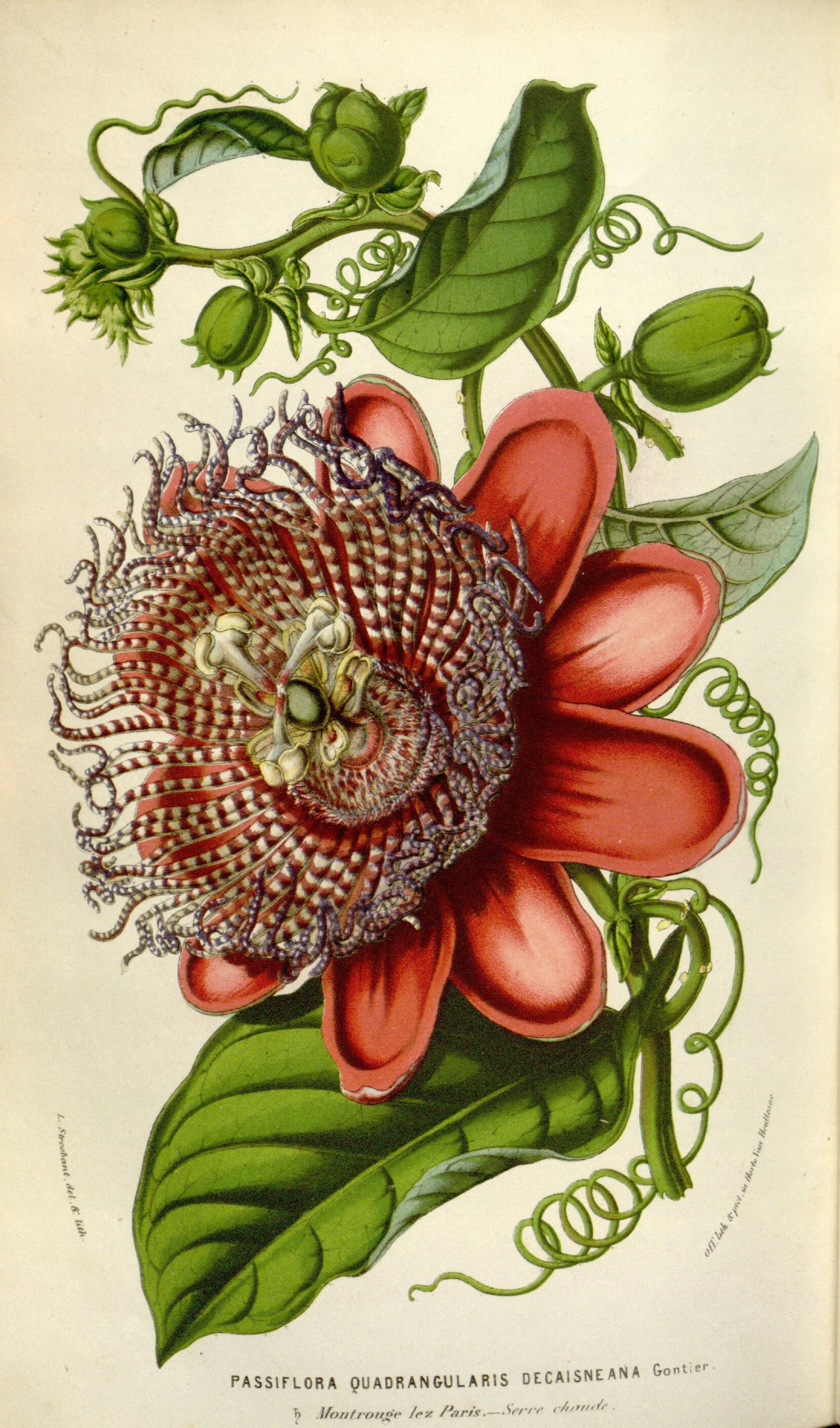
Louis van Houtte,1853
