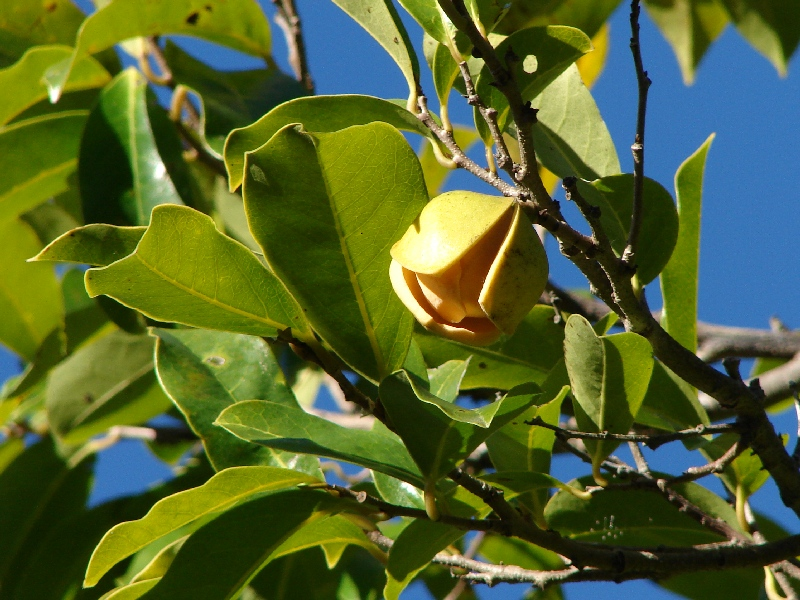

Conservation status
- Least Concern (IUCN 3.1)

Scientific classification
- Kingdom: Plantae
- Clade: Tracheophytes
- Clade: Angiosperms
- Clade: Magnoliids
- Order: Magnoliales
- Family: Annonaceae
- Genus: Annona
- Species: A. montana

Binomial name
- Annona montana Macfad.

Synonyms
- Annona marcgravii Mart.; Annona montana f. marcgravii (Mart.) Porto; Annona pisonis Mart.; Annona sariffa Roxb. ex Hensch.; Annona sphaerocarpa Splitg.

= Annona montana =

Species of tree

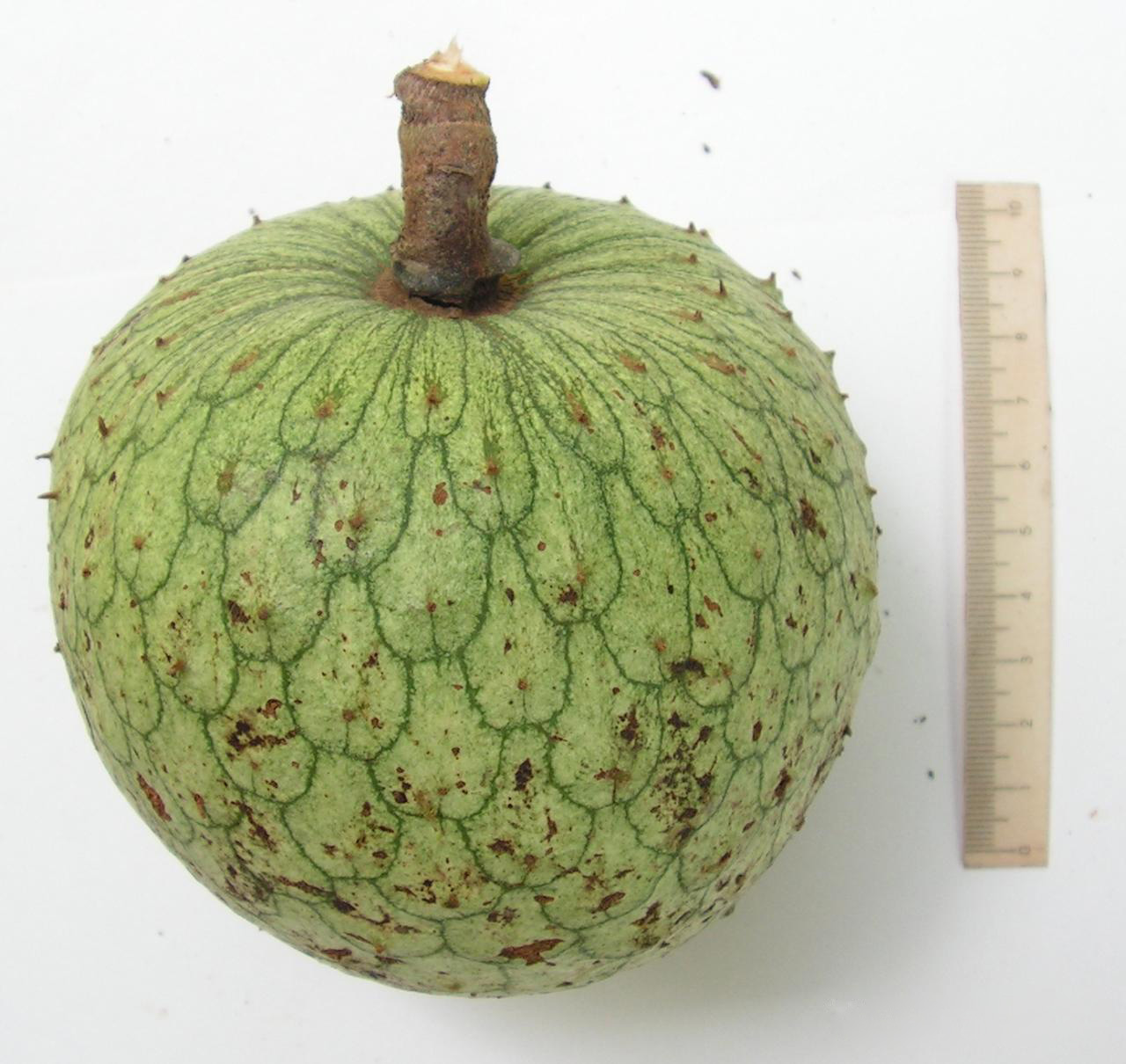
Ripening fruit, in Pernambuco, Brazil

Annona montana, the mountain soursop, is a tree and its edible fruit in the Annonaceae family native to Central America, the Amazon, and islands in the Caribbean. It has fibrous fruits. A. montana may be used as a rootstock for cultivated Annonas.

== Etymology and common names ==
The Latin specific epithet montana refers to mountains or "coming from mountains".

- English: mountain soursop, mountain sop, wild soursop
- Czech: mountain soursop
- German: Schleimapfel
- Spanish: guanábana cimarrona, guanábana, guanábana de loma, guanábana de monte, guanábana de perro, taragus, turagua
- French: corossolier bâtard
- Guarani: araticu
- Hungarian: hegyi annóna
- Portuguese: araticum, araticum açú, araticum apé
- Slovak: anona

== Description ==
The tree is similar to Annona muricata, but has a more spreading crown and glossy leaves. It is slightly hardier and bears fruit throughout the year. It tolerates brief temperature drops down to 24 °F (−4 °C) when full grown. Its pollen is shed as permanent tetrads. The fruits are nearly round, with dark green skin covered with many short fleshy spines, and are about 15 centimetres (5.9 in) long. Yellow, fibrous pulp – which is aromatic – is sour and bitter, containing many light-brown, plump seeds. There is history of its use as a traditional medicine.

== Distribution ==
A. montana grows wild at altitudes from 0 metres (0 ft) to 650 metres (2,130 ft). Its natural distribution is:

Caribbean: West Indies
Central America: Costa Rica, Panama
South America: Bolivia, Colombia, Ecuador, Peru, Venezuela, Brazil
United States: Southern Florida

== See also ==
- List of plants of Amazon Rainforest vegetation of Brazil
