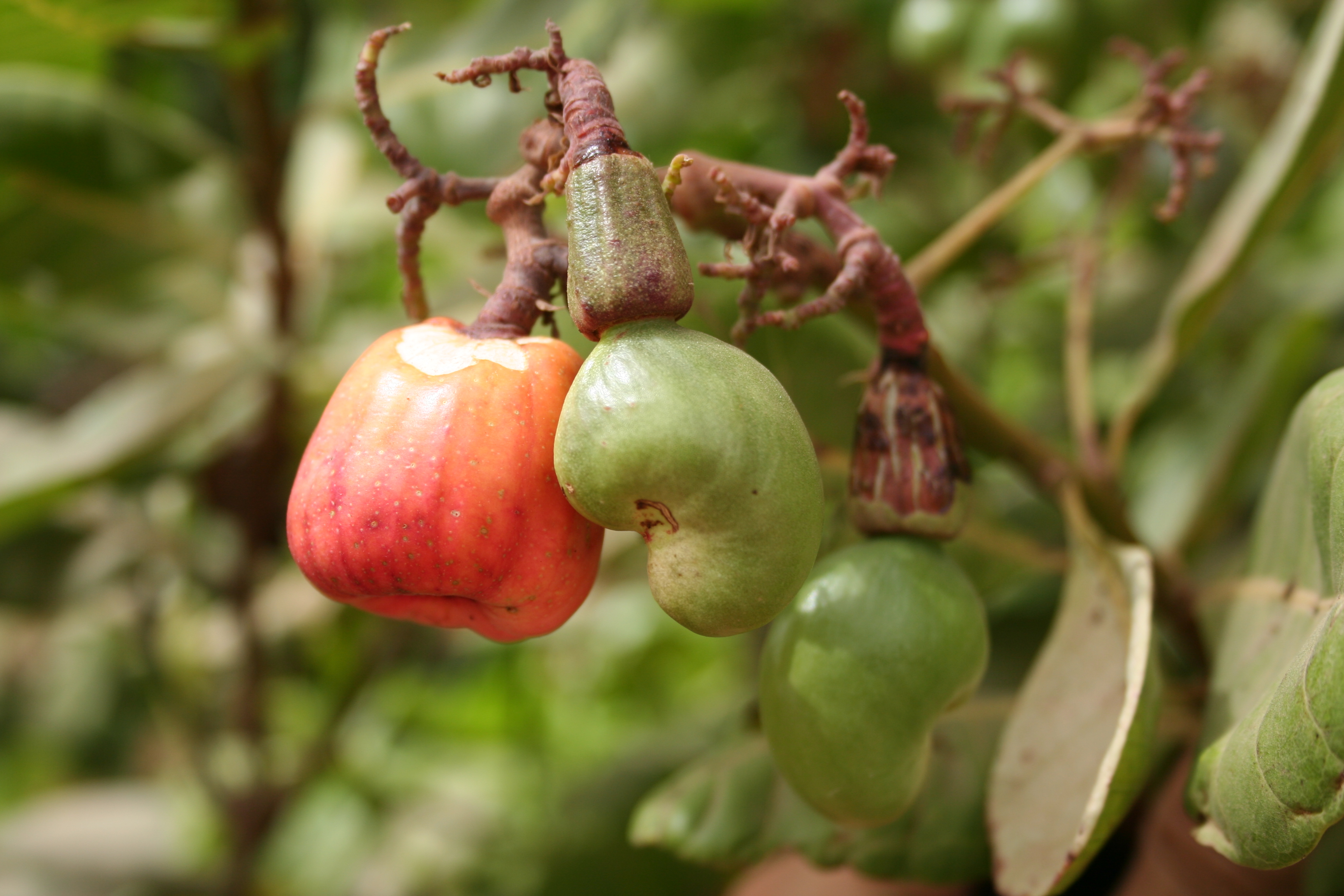
- Anacardium occidentale fruit

Scientific classification
- Kingdom: Plantae
- Clade: Tracheophytes
- Clade: Angiosperms
- Clade: Eudicots
- Clade: Rosids
- Order: Sapindales
- Family: Anacardiaceae
- Subfamily: Anacardioideae
- Genus: Anacardium; L.

Species
- See text

Synonyms
- Cassuvium Lam. Rhinocarpus Bertero & Balb. ex Kunth

= Anacardium =

Anacardium Temporal range: Eocene–Recent

Genus of flowering plants

Anacardium, the cashews, are a genus of flowering plants in the family Anacardiaceae, native to tropical regions of the Americas. The best known species is Anacardium occidentale, which is commercially cultivated for its cashew nuts and cashew apples.

== Etymology ==
The name Anacardium, originally from the Greek, actually refers to the nut, core or heart of the fruit, which is outwardly located (ana means "upwards" and -cardium means "heart").

== Taxonomy ==
The oldest species of the genus Anacardium is Anacardium germanicum from the Eocene aged Messel Pit of Germany, well outside the current range of the genus. They were present in the Americas by the Oligocene-Miocene, as evidenced by the species Anacardium gassonii from Panama.

As of July 2020, the PoWO (Plants of the World Online) accepts 13 species:

- Anacardium amapaense J.D.Mitch.
- Anacardium amilcarianum Machado
- Anacardium brasiliense Barb.Rodr.
- Anacardium caracolii Mutis ex Alba
- Anacardium corymbosum Barb.Rodr.
- Anacardium excelsum L.
- Anacardium fruticosum J.Mitch. & S.A.Mori
- Anacardium giganteum (Bertero & Balb. ex Kunth) Skeels
- Anacardium humile Hance ex Engl.
- Anacardium microsepalum Loes.
- Anacardium nanum A.St.-Hil.
- Anacardium occidentale L.
- Anacardium parvifolium Ducke
