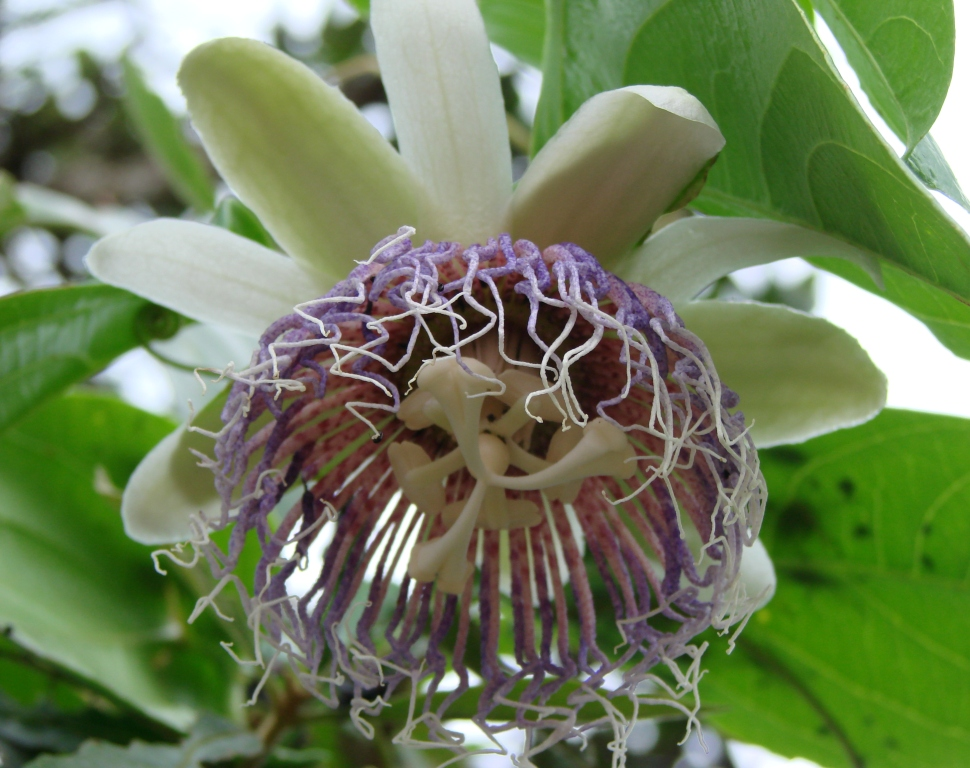
- Passiflora nitida flowers
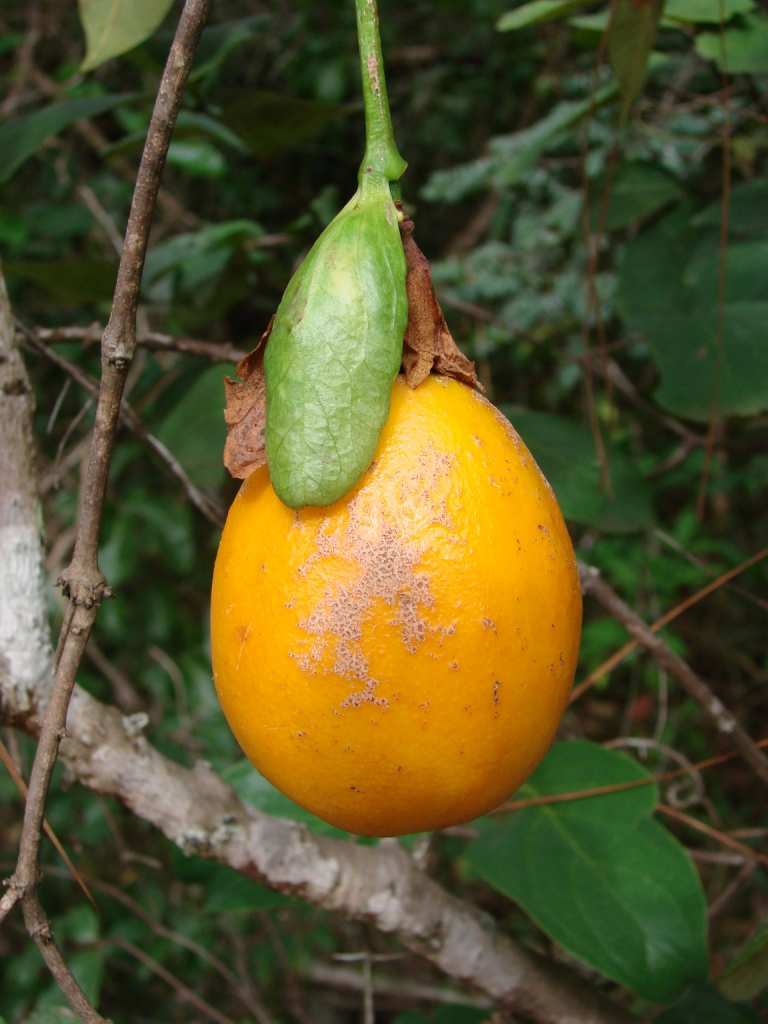
- Passiflora nitida fruit.

Scientific classification
- Kingdom: Plantae
- Clade: Tracheophytes
- Clade: Angiosperms
- Clade: Eudicots
- Clade: Rosids
- Order: Malpighiales
- Family: Passifloraceae
- Genus: Passiflora
- Species: P. nitida

Binomial name
- Passiflora nitida Kunth.

= Passiflora nitida =

Bell apple

Species of vine

Passiflora nitida, the bell apple, is a passion fruit. It is similar to P. laurifolia, with orange-yellow fruits that have a sweet pulp. It is a fast-growing tropical vine. Its flowers are blue and red, a bit like P. laurifolia and P. quadrangularis. The fruits grow up to 4 centimetres (1.6 in). The exact hardiness in unknown, but it is tropical and should be protected from prolonged temperatures below 50–55 °F (10–13 °C). It is not frost hardy. Passiflora nitida is the cousin of almost all the Passiflora species like P. actinia, P. flavicarpa, P. loefgrenii and so on. Its propagation is by seeds. The fruits are eaten fresh. The bell apple is a native to the Amazon jungle region. Passiflora nitida has one of the widest geographic ranges. It grows in the tropical lowlands from Costa Rica in the north and French Guiana in the northeast, through wide parts of Brazil.
