= Couepia bracteosa =

Conservation status
- Least Concern (IUCN 3.1)

Scientific classification
- Kingdom: Plantae
- Clade: Tracheophytes
- Clade: Angiosperms
- Clade: Eudicots
- Clade: Rosids
- Order: Malpighiales
- Family: Chrysobalanaceae
- Genus: Couepia
- Species: C. bracteosa

Binomial name
- Couepia bracteosa Benth.

Synonyms
- Couepia bracteosa var. grandifolia Benoist; Couepia bracteosa var. minor Ducke; Couepia bracteosa f. typica Porto; Moquilea bracteosa (Benth.) Walp.; Moquilea rufa Barb.Rodr.

Species of tree

Couepia bracteosa, also known by the common name pajurá, is a tree found in lowland Amazon Rainforest of northern Brazil, the Guianas, Colombia, Peru, and Bolivia.

The species was described by George Bentham in 1840. Common names include Aruadan, Coro, Marirana, Oiti, Olosapo, Pajura de mata, Pajura-de-racha, and Pajura-verdadeiro.

Its fruits are used as a food source in rural South America, especially in Brazil.

== See also ==
- List of Brazilian fruits
