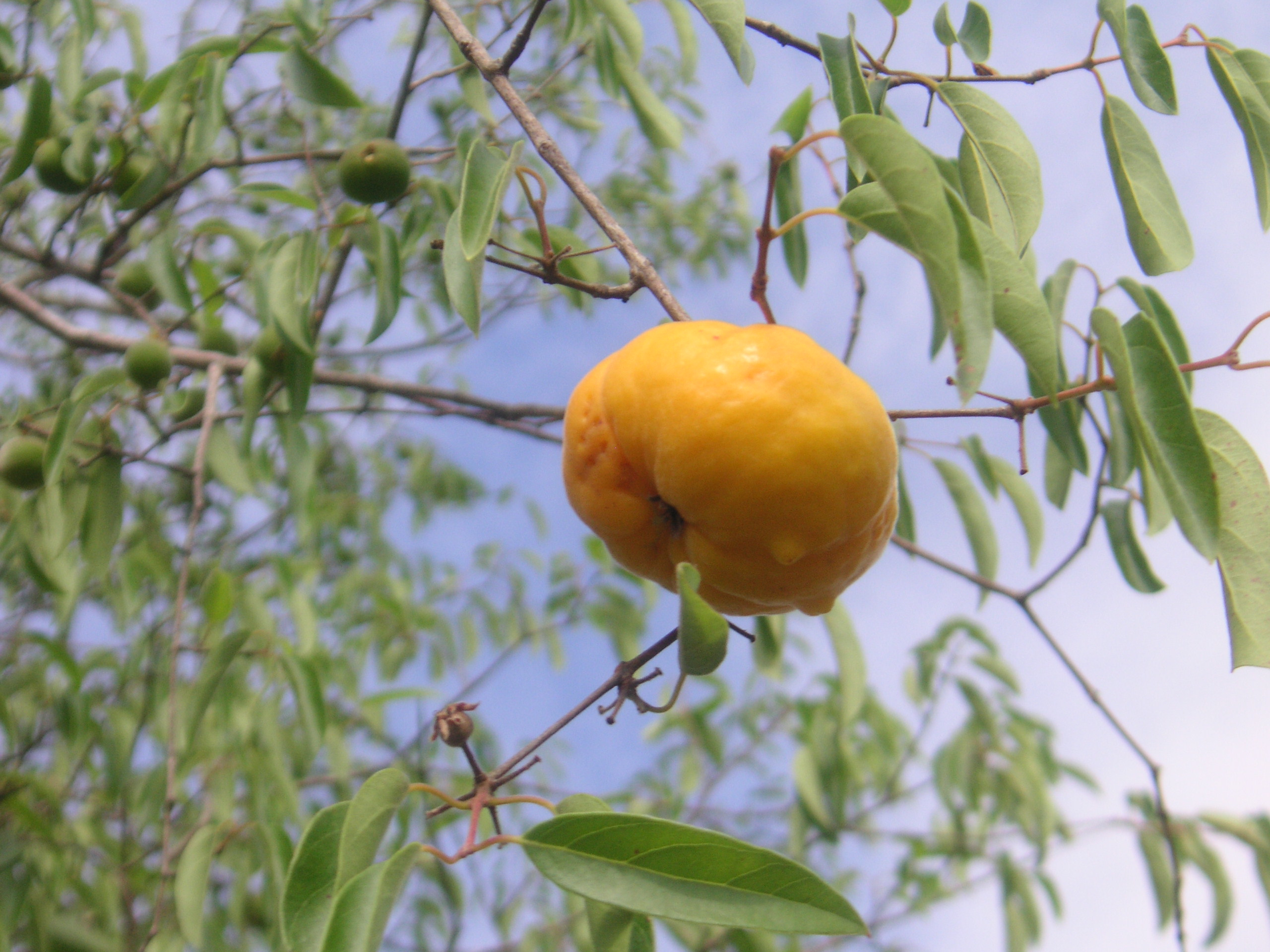

Conservation status
- Least Concern (IUCN 3.1)

Scientific classification
- Kingdom: Plantae
- Clade: Tracheophytes
- Clade: Angiosperms
- Clade: Eudicots
- Clade: Rosids
- Order: Myrtales
- Family: Myrtaceae
- Genus: Eugenia
- Species: E. myrcianthes

Binomial name
- Eugenia myrcianthes Nied.

Synonyms
- Calomyrtus excelsa (Cambess.) Blume; Campomanesia cagaiteira Kiaersk.; Eugenia edulis (O.Berg) Benth. & Hook.f. ex Griseb.; Eugenia montevidensis Mattos; Hexachlamys edulis (O.Berg) Kausel & D.Legrand; Hexachlamys excelsa (Cambess.) Mattos; Luma grisebachii Herter; Luma myrcianthes (Nied.) Herter; Myrcia gemmiflora O.Berg; Myrcia sparsifolia Barb.Rodr.; Myrcianthes edulis O.Berg; Myrtus excelsa Cambess.; Psidium amygdalinum Hook. & Arn.

= Eugenia myrcianthes =

Species of tree

Eugenia myrcianthes (synonym Hexachlamys edulis) or ubajay is a species of plant in the family Myrtaceae found in Argentina, Bolivia, Brazil, Paraguay and Uruguay.

== Description ==
Eugenia myrcianthe is a densely branched tree with dark and sealed bark, reaching 4 to 8 m in height. The leaves are globose, with evergreen foliage. They are simple, opposite, with the pubescent petiole, from ovate-oblong to lanceolate, acuminate, 3 to 6 cm long; Coriaceous, show pubescence when young and becoming glabrous with age.

It blooms in early spring. Flowers are typical of myrtaceae; Appearing in the leaf axils, and are white, solitary with up to fifty stamens. About two months later it produces fruits, producing a globose and yellow color fruit, of up to 5 cm of diameter. It tastes similar to peach (Prunus persica) giving its vulgar name of peach tree. The fruit is edible, with the orange pulp, very juicy, slightly tart aftertaste when fully ripe.
