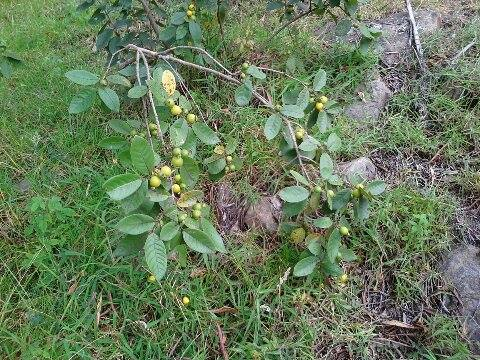

Conservation status
- Least Concern (IUCN 3.1)

Scientific classification
- Kingdom: Plantae
- Clade: Tracheophytes
- Clade: Angiosperms
- Clade: Eudicots
- Clade: Rosids
- Order: Myrtales
- Family: Myrtaceae
- Genus: Psidium
- Species: P. acutangulum

Binomial name
- Psidium acutangulum DC.

Synonyms
- Guajava acutangula (Mart. ex DC.) Kuntze; Psidium acidum Mart. ex O.Berg; Psidium acutangulum var. crassirame O.Berg; Psidium acutangulum var. oblongatum Mattos; Psidium acutangulum var. tenuirame O.Berg; Psidium persoonii McVaugh

= Psidium acutangulum =

Species of tree

Psidium acutangulum is a species of flowering plant in the family Myrtaceae. It is a shrub or tree native to Bolivia, central, northern, and northeastern Brazil, Colombia, Ecuador, the Guianas, Peru, and Venezuela in tropical South America. It grows in lowland tropical moist forests.

The species was described by Augustin Pyramus de Candolle in 1828.
