= Inga macrophylla =

Conservation status
- Least Concern (IUCN 2.3)

Scientific classification
- Kingdom: Plantae
- Clade: Tracheophytes
- Clade: Angiosperms
- Clade: Eudicots
- Clade: Rosids
- Order: Fabales
- Family: Fabaceae
- Subfamily: Caesalpinioideae
- Clade: Mimosoid clade
- Genus: Inga
- Species: I. macrophylla

Binomial name
- Inga macrophylla Humb. & Bonpl. ex Willd.

Species of legume

Inga macrophylla is a species of plant in the family Fabaceae. It is found in tropical South America. The common name ingá-chinelo derives from the fact that the fruit pods are large and flat like a flip flop.
