= Endopleura =

Conservation status
- Least Concern (IUCN 3.1)

Scientific classification
- Kingdom: Plantae
- Clade: Tracheophytes
- Clade: Angiosperms
- Clade: Eudicots
- Clade: Rosids
- Order: Malpighiales
- Family: Humiriaceae
- Genus: Endopleura; Cuatrec.
- Species: E. uchi

Binomial name
- Endopleura uchi (Huber) Cuatrec.

Synonyms
- Sacoglottis uchi Huber

Genus of plants

Endopleura is a genus of flowering plants belonging to the family Humiriaceae. It is a monotypic genus consisting of the species Endopleura uchi (Huber) Cuatrec.. Its native range is Northern Brazil.
