= James Macfadyen =

Scottish botanist (1799–1850)

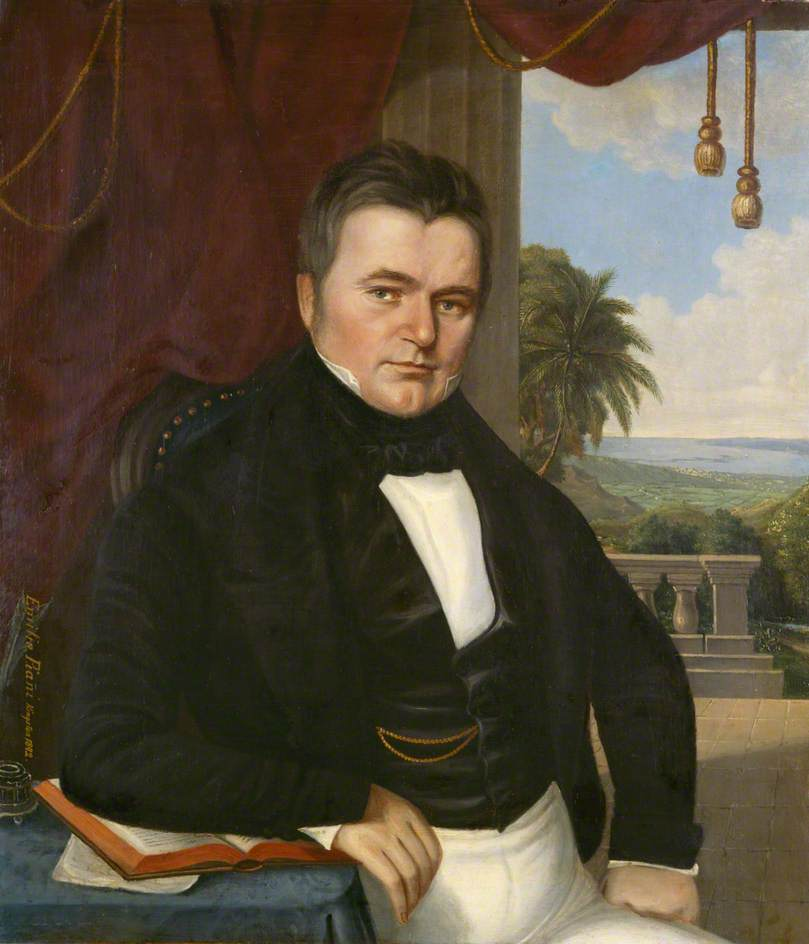
- portrait by Emilio Piani
- Died: 1850
- Awards: Fellow of the Linnean Society of London

James MacFadyen (1799–1850) was a Scottish medical doctor and botanist who made a significant contribution to the scientific study of the plants of the Caribbean region. Born in Glasgow on 3 May 1799, he was the eldest son of a music publisher and bookseller, John Macfadyen, and his wife Elisabeth. Macfayden was the first to describe the grapefruit scientifically - he gave it its Linnean name, Citrus paradisi - and to describe new species of fig trees and other Caribbean plants. In addition to his contributions to botany, MacFadyen practised medicine and was actively involved in social organisations in Jamaica. He was elected Fellow of the Linnean Society of London on 16 January 1838 and (posthumously) Fellow of the Geological Society of London on 30 November 1850. On 25 November 1832 in Port Royal he married Margaret McGowan, by whom he had two daughters. After his wife's death on 21 June 1843, he married Emma, by whom he had a son (John J.) and a daughter (Mary E.). Whilst treating patients during one of the periodic epidemics of cholera there, he himself contracted the disease and died on 24 November 1850.

== Early life ==
James MacFadyen was born in Glasgow on 3 May 1799, he was the eldest son of a music publisher and bookseller, John MacFadyen, and his wife Elisabeth.

== Career and civic involvement ==
He studied medicine around 1818–21 at Glasgow University, where a lifelong interest in botany was sparked; but only in 1837 was he awarded the MD degree. His developing medical career was curtailed by his application - on the recommendation of Sir William Hooker, at that time Professor of Botany at Glasgow University - to become "island botanist" with a brief to establish a botanical garden on Jamaica. After his arrival there in August 1825, he embarked on a detailed study of its natural history, culminating in his two volumes of The Flora of Jamaica; the first was published at his own expense in Glasgow in 1837 and the second posthumously. He was the first to describe the grapefruit scientifically - he gave it its Linnean name, Citrus paradisi - and to describe new species of fig trees and other Caribbean plants. His attempt in 1825–26 to establish a botanical garden in the area around Bath was unsuccessful, caused by a combination of poor soil there and inadequate financial support. MacFadyen set up a profitable medical practice on the island. Over the course of his 25 years on Jamaica, MacFadyen held many positions of responsibility, some related to his work and others of a social nature. His substantive post was as a medical practitioner, including being surgeon to the Female Penitentiary in Kingston. He also contributed to attempts to enhance the island's economy, by publicising his scientific work and its possible commercial applications. He was Assistant Judge or Magistrate in several parishes and he was President of the Kingston Philharmonic Society. He was also a committed freemason who held numerous senior positions in the charitable masonic lodges on the island. An oil painting of him dated 1842 survives in the art collection of the archives at the Royal Botanic Gardens, Kew, London. He was elected Fellow of the Linnean Society of London on 16 January 1838 and (posthumously) Fellow of the Geological Society of London on 30 November 1850. He maintained contact with Sir William Hooker, who was later to become Director at Kew Gardens, by sending him accounts of his scientific studies and plant specimens over the period 1826–50. In letters to Sir William in 1849, Macfadyen complains about his inadequate “emoluments” that give him little time for botany and that prompt him to ask Hooker for help in securing alternative employment back in England. However he never left Jamaica. Whilst treating patients during one of the periodic epidemics of cholera there, he contracted the disease and died on 24 November 1850. A summary of his lifetime achievements appears in an obituary presented to the meeting of the Linnean Society on 24 May 1851.

== Personal life ==
On 25 November 1832 in Port Royal he married Margaret McGowan, by whom he had two daughters. After his wife's death on 21 June 1843, he married Emma, by whom he had a son (John J.) and a daughter (Mary E.).

== Literature ==
- The Flora of Jamaica
