= Attalea dubia =

Scientific classification
- Kingdom: Plantae
- Clade: Tracheophytes
- Clade: Angiosperms
- Clade: Monocots
- Clade: Commelinids
- Order: Arecales
- Family: Arecaceae
- Genus: Attalea
- Species: A. dubia

Binomial name
- Attalea dubia (Mart.) Burret
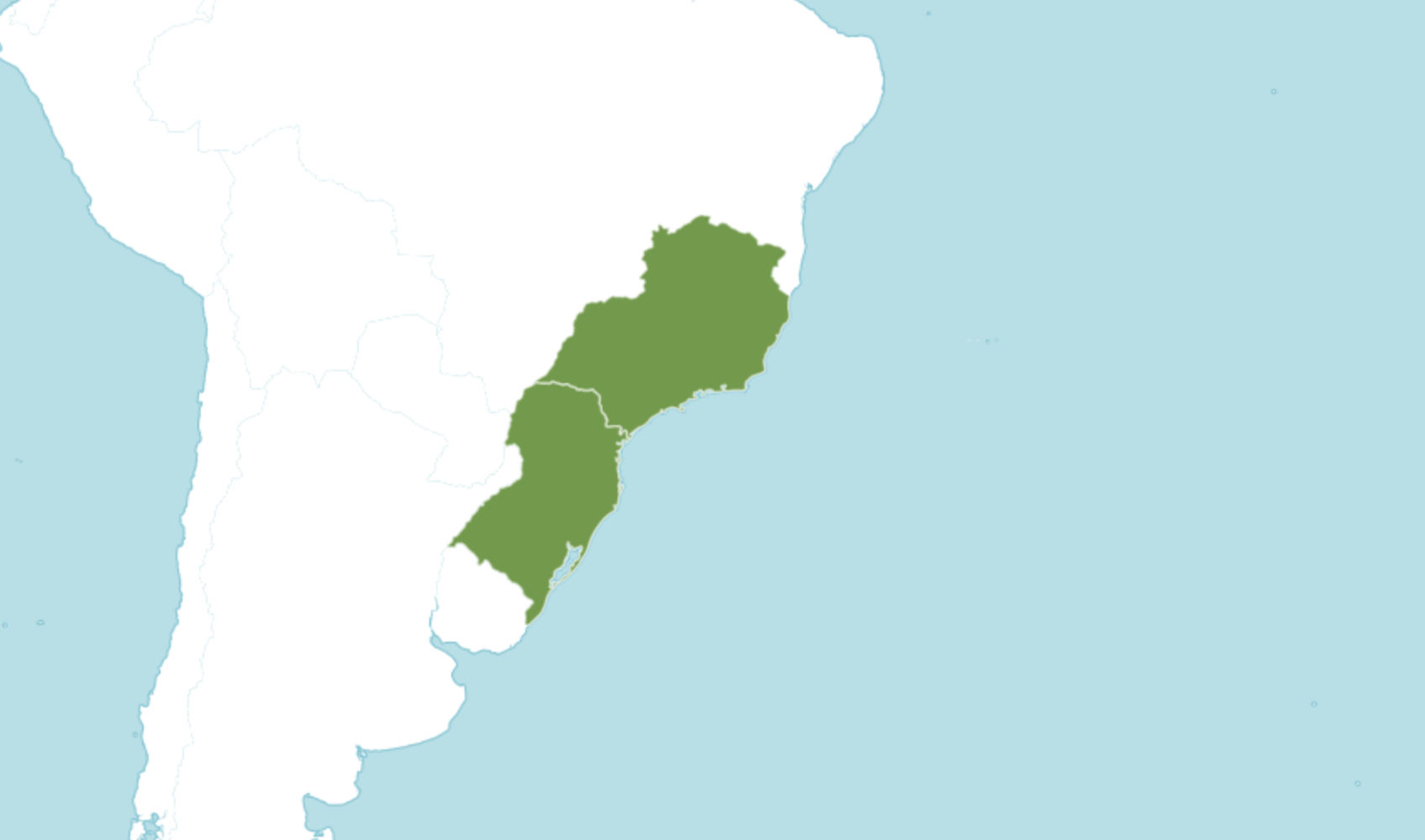
- Natural range

Synonyms
- Attalea concinna (Barb.Rodr.) Burret; Attalea indaya Drude; Desmoncus dubius (Mart.) Rollisson; Orbignya dubia Mart.; Pindarea concinna Barb.Rodr.; Pindarea dubia (Mart.) A.D.Hawkes; Pindarea fastuosa Barb.Rodr.; Scheelea dubia (Mart.) Burret

Species of palm

Attalea dubia, also known as the Indaiá plant, babassu palm, or bacuaçu palm is a flowering plant in the family Arecaceae, native to the Southern and Southeast Regions of Brazil.

== Description ==
The species grows to 25 metres (82 ft) tall and has a trunk diameter of about 35 centimetres (14 in). An evergreen monocot with a moist and tropical habitat, it has a sturdy, columnar, woody trunk and palmate leaves.

== Taxonomy ==
The species was first described in 1929 in Notizblatt des Botanischen Gartens und Museums zu Berlin-Dahlem where the authors, working for the botanical garden and museum in Berlin and with Freie Universität Berlin, cataloged plant, algal, and fungal taxonomy.

== Reproduction ==
There are male and female flowers in the same bunch, 1–1.5 m long. The male flowers are distributed in two rows per bunch, with sepals 1–2 mm long and flat and pointed petals, 8–20 mm long by 1.5–2.5 mm wide, and 6–10 stamens. The female flowers are larger, measuring 25–40 mm in length and 15–17 mm in diameter. The hardiness of A. dublia's seeds, resulting from their tough endocarp and their need to be buried for germination, make them difficult to germinate with germination taking between 4–6 months.

== Predation ==
Attalea dubia's fruit are predated upon by two primary organisms: A beetle species known as Pachymerus sp. and a rodent species known as Dasyprocta leporina (red rumped agouti). Both prey on the fallen fruit from the palm and work in competition with one another. The beetles have larger predation against A. dublia while the fruit resides in pastures however, when in the Atlantic Forest, the rodents dominate predation. Overall, the palm seeds normally survive with up to 87% surviving at some testing sites.

== Uses ==
The fruit from the tree is popular in the creation of medicines, beauty aids, and beverages. The palm core can be harvested but its extraction often results in death and is therefore not able to be cultivated due to its importance in the local ecosystem on fauna. The fruit is composed of numerous woody oblong fruits looking similar to small coconuts.

=== Physicochemical properties ===
Attalea dubia, often seen similar to A. speciosa, can be cultivated for its oil and thatch and lumber with nearly every part of this palm can serve some practical purpose. The oil, Indaiá oil, is very similar compositionally to babassu oil, an edible cooking oil that can be used in skincare and cleansers. The Indaiá oil composition is fairly similar to the babassu oil with less unsaturated fatty acids (5.8% and 9.45%). The four main fatty acids that were present are lauric acid, myristic acid, caprylic acid, and capric acid. These same four fatty acids appear in babassu oil in nearly an identical composition.

=== Other ===
With babassu oil being used in cooking, Indaiá oil can be as well. Other uses include being used in lubricant, soaps, and cosmetics. The leaves from the palm can be used as thatching for shelter palm hearts for juices, and the high fiber concentration in the leaves and fruit being used to make handicrafts such as baskets. The trees themselves are seen as ornamental and are occasionally used as landscaping.

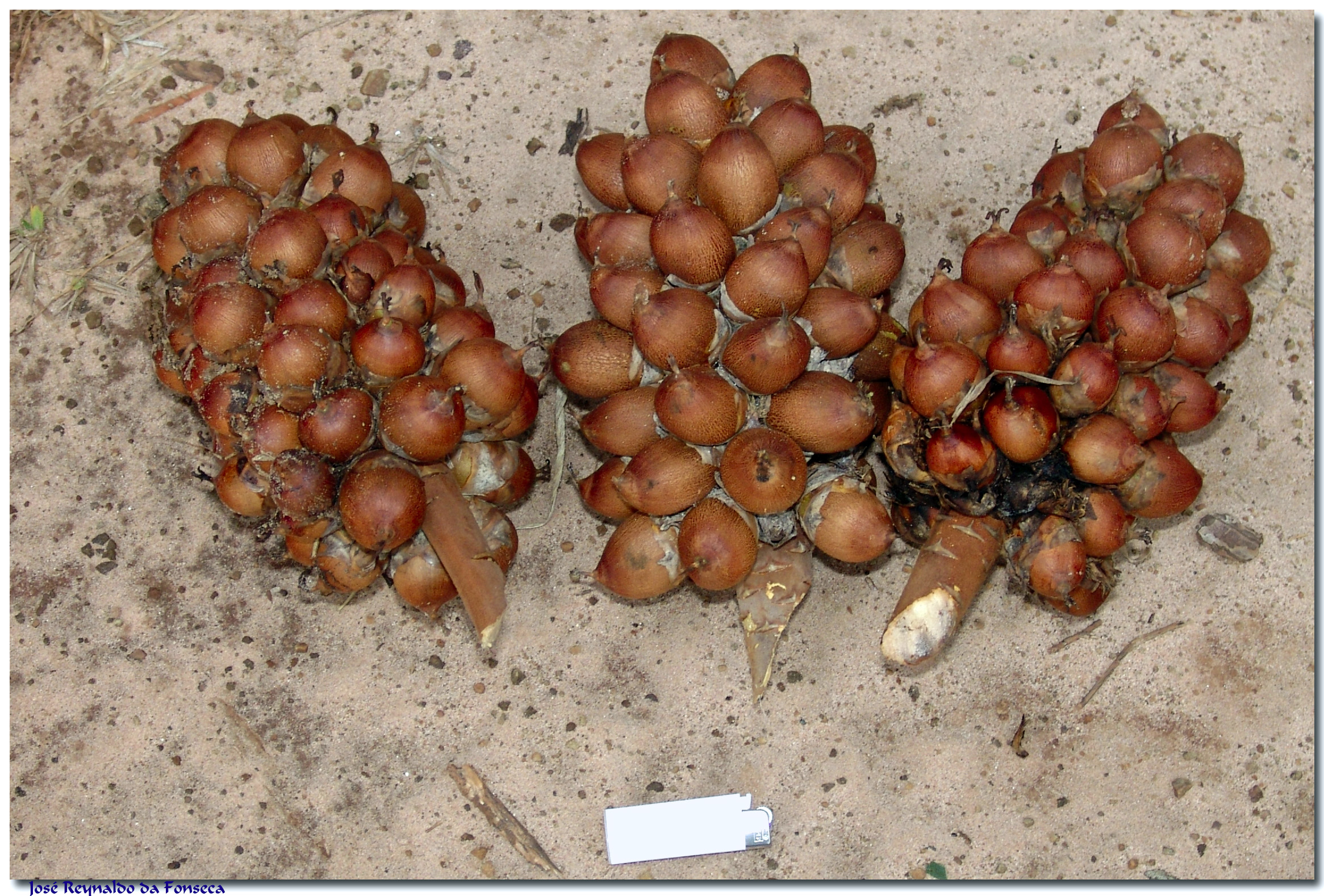
Attalea dubia fruit
