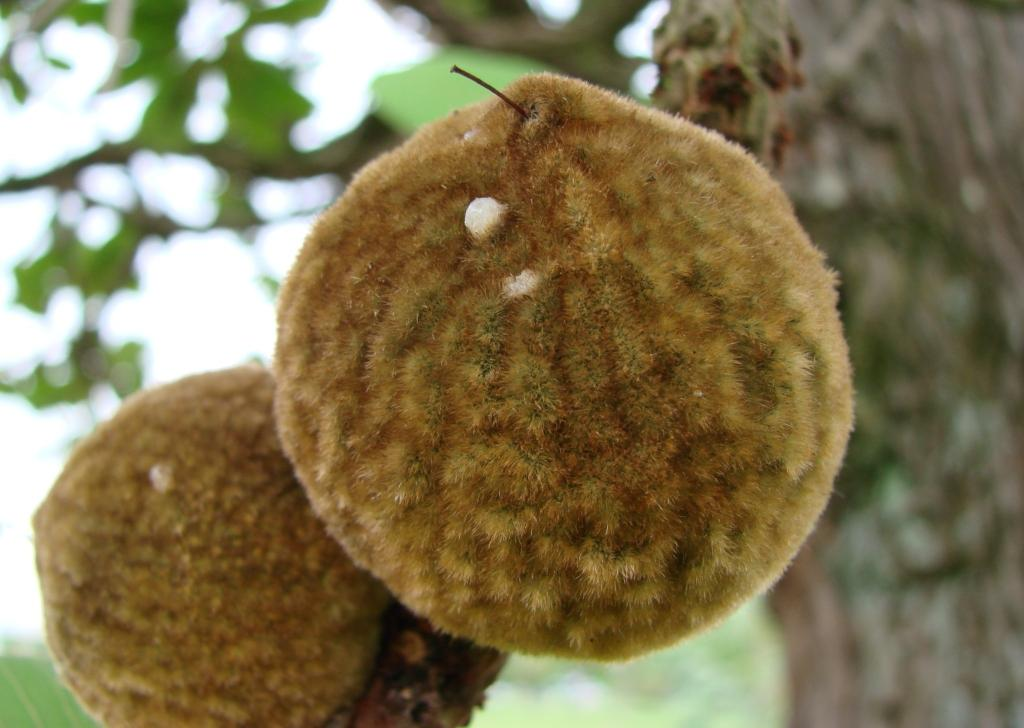

Scientific classification
- Kingdom: Plantae
- Clade: Tracheophytes
- Clade: Angiosperms
- Clade: Eudicots
- Clade: Asterids
- Order: Ericales
- Family: Sapotaceae
- Genus: Pouteria
- Species: P. torta

Binomial name
- Pouteria torta (Mart.) Radlk.

Synonyms
- Lucuma torta (Mart.) A.DC.; Labatia torta Mart.; Guapeba torta (Mart.) Pierre

= Pouteria torta =

Species of tree

Pouteria torta is a species of tree native to Central and South America. It is found largely in the Brazilian cerrado and is commonly called guapeva and grão-de-galo.
