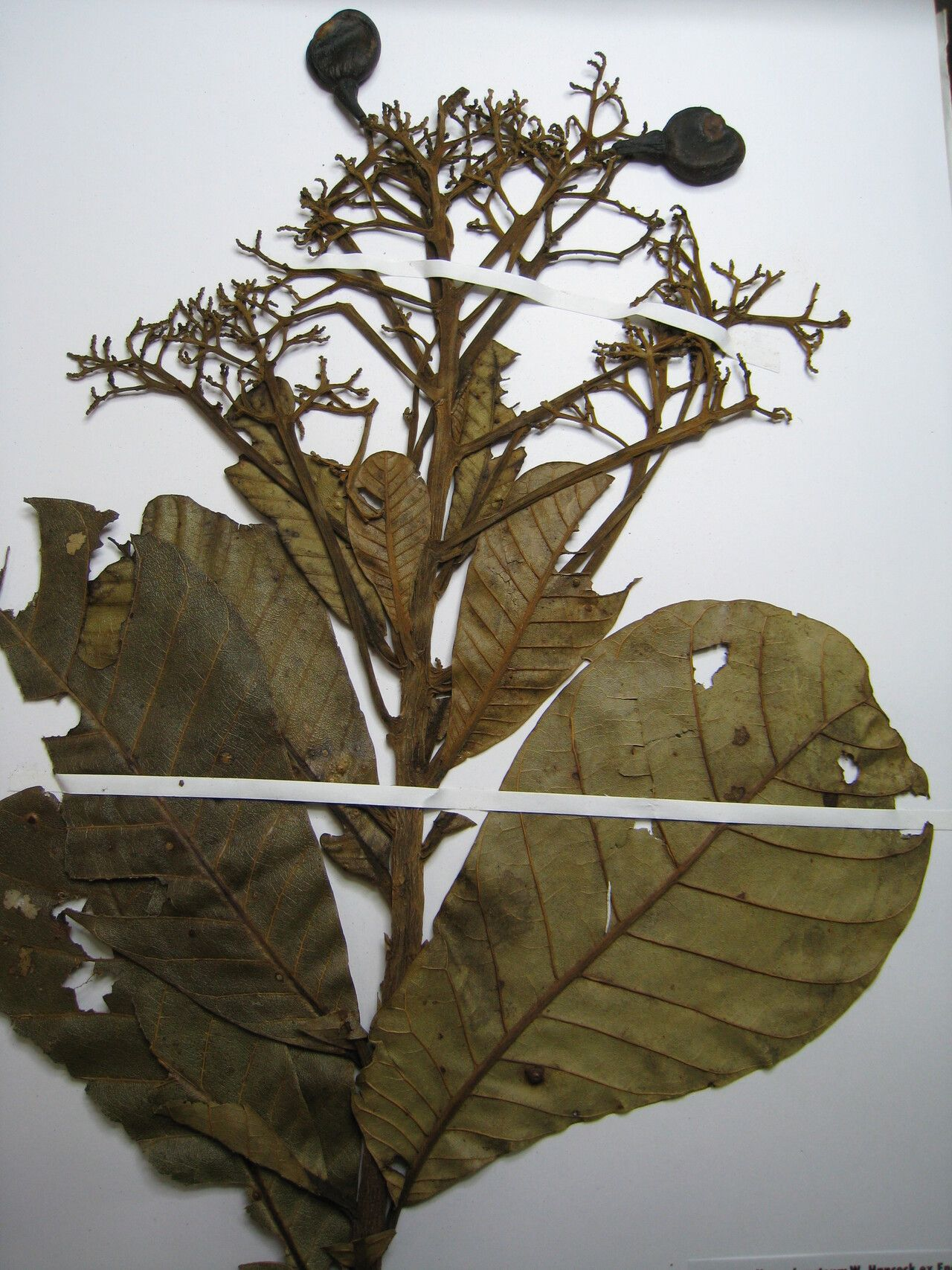

Scientific classification
- Kingdom: Plantae
- Clade: Tracheophytes
- Clade: Angiosperms
- Clade: Eudicots
- Clade: Rosids
- Order: Sapindales
- Family: Anacardiaceae
- Genus: Anacardium
- Species: A. giganteum

Binomial name
- Anacardium giganteum Hancock ex Engl.

= Anacardium giganteum =

Species of flowering plant

Anacardium giganteum, also known as cajui, of the family Anacardiaceae, are huge, round and mostly straight trees that usually occur in upland rainforest and sometimes in the high flood plains that hold the soil, resistant to water-log. The fruit is edible and very sweet. The plant is also called Javillo, Cornonzuelo, or Espave.

The wood is used for temporary moulding on construction works. It is of low quality with coarse fibers. Because it bends and splits when drying out, it is used just after sawing. The wood contains silica, so it requires special saws to cut as the metal is quickly worn, and for the same reason it is resistant to boring insects. It can be used as rootstock for other cashew varieties.
