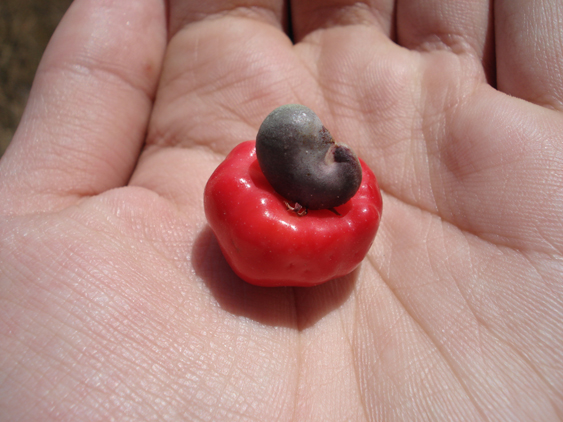

Scientific classification
- Kingdom: Plantae
- Clade: Tracheophytes
- Clade: Angiosperms
- Clade: Eudicots
- Clade: Rosids
- Order: Sapindales
- Family: Anacardiaceae
- Genus: Anacardium
- Species: A. humile

Binomial name
- Anacardium humile Hance ex Engl.

= Anacardium humile =

Species of flowering plant

Anacardium humile, a plant species from the genus Anacardium and the family Anacardiaceae, is known for its medicinal and insecticidal properties. The shrub is commonly found in the Brazilian Pantanal and Cerrado. Common names include monkey nut, dwarf cashew nut, cajui, cajuzinho-do-cerrado, and caju-do-campo.
