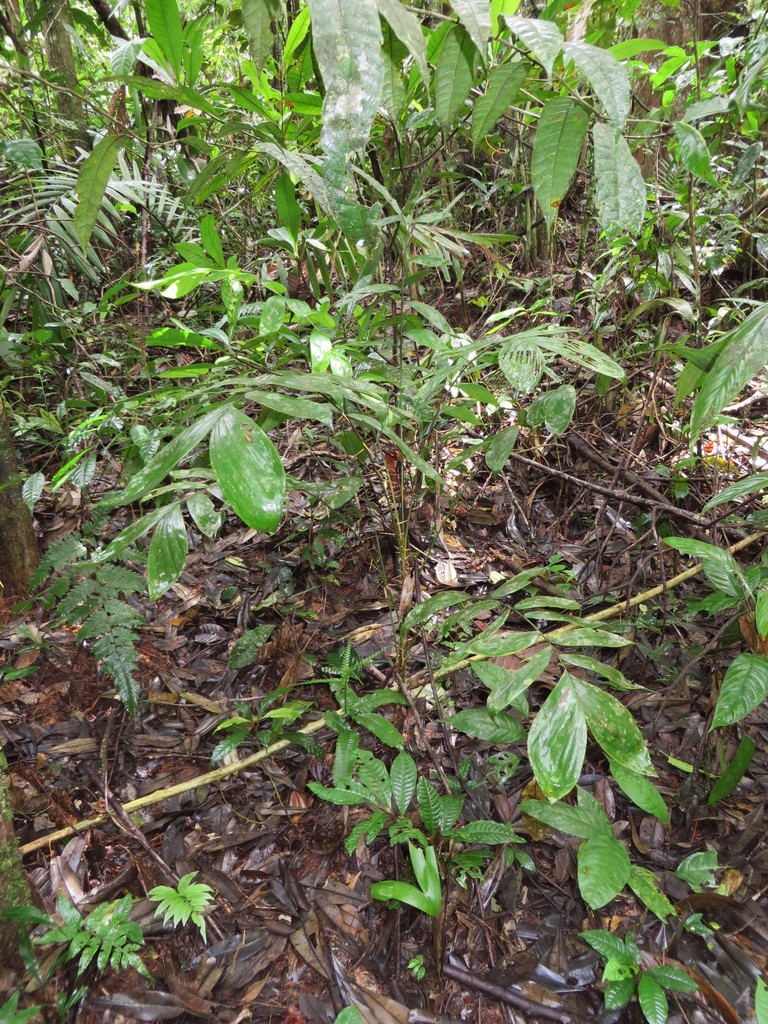

Conservation status
- Least Concern (IUCN 3.1)

Scientific classification
- Kingdom: Plantae
- Clade: Embryophytes
- Clade: Tracheophytes
- Clade: Angiosperms
- Clade: Monocots
- Clade: Commelinids
- Order: Arecales
- Family: Arecaceae
- Genus: Bactris
- Species: B. maraja

Binomial name
- Bactris maraja Mart.

Varieties
- Bactris maraja var. chaetospatha (Mart.) A.J.Hend.; Bactris maraja var. juruensis (Trail) A.J.Hend.; Bactris maraja var. maraja; Bactris maraja var. trichospatha (Trail) A.J.Hend.

Synonyms
- Pyrenoglyphis maraja (Mart.) Burret

= Bactris maraja =

Species of flowering plant

Bactris maraja is a species of flowering plant in the family Arecaceae. It is native to South America, and was described in 1826.

Bactris maraja is a shrub or understorey palm, with compound leaves and edible fruits. The International Union for Conservation of Nature lists the species as of Least Concern.

== Taxonomy ==
The species was first described by Carl Friedrich Philipp von Martius in 1826.

Four varieties are recognised:

- Bactris maraja var. chaetospatha (Mart.) A.J.Hend. - Native to northern Brazil, Colombia, and Peru
- Bactris maraja var. juruensis (Trail) A.J.Hend. - Native to Bolivia, northern Brazil, Colombia, and Peru. May be present in French Guiana
- Bactris maraja var. maraja - Native to Bolivia, northern and west central Brazil, Colombia, Costa Rica, Ecuador, Guyana, Panamá, Peru, Suriname, and Venezuela
- Bactris maraja var. trichospatha (Trail) A.J.Hend. - Native to Bolivia, northern Brazil, Colombia, French Guiana, Guyana, Peru, Suriname, and Venezuela

== Distribution ==
Bactris maraja is native to the wet tropical biome of South America. It is present in Bolivia, northern and west-central Brazil, Colombia, Costa Rica, Ecuador, French Guiana, Guyana, Panama, Peru, Suriname, and Venezuela. It is found at elevations of 0–1,000 metres (0–3,281 ft).

The species grows in various types of forests. It usually grows on non-inundated soils, but can also be found in waterlogged soil near streams.

== Description ==
Bactris maraja is a shrub or tree. It is an understory palm. The stems are in clusters of up to fifteen. The stems are 1–7 metres (3.3–23.0 ft) tall, and 1–4 centimetres (0.39–1.57 in) wide.

The leaves are compound, and have seventeen to thirty pinnae on each side. The leaf spines are flattened, 5–10 centimetres (2.0–3.9 in) long, and yellowish, turning black at the base and apex. The leaf stems are 13–76 centimetres (5.1–29.9 in) long.

The flower stems are 11–18 centimetres (4.3–7.1 in) long. The male flowers are around 3.55 millimetres (0.140 in) long. The female flowers are 3–4 millimetres (0.12–0.16 in) long.

The petals are 3–5 millimetres (0.12–0.20 in) long, and form a tubular corolla. The sepals are 0.5–1.5 millimetres (0.020–0.059 in) long. The calyx is a 2.5–4 millimetres (0.098–0.157 in) tube. Bactris maraja flowers in January and February.

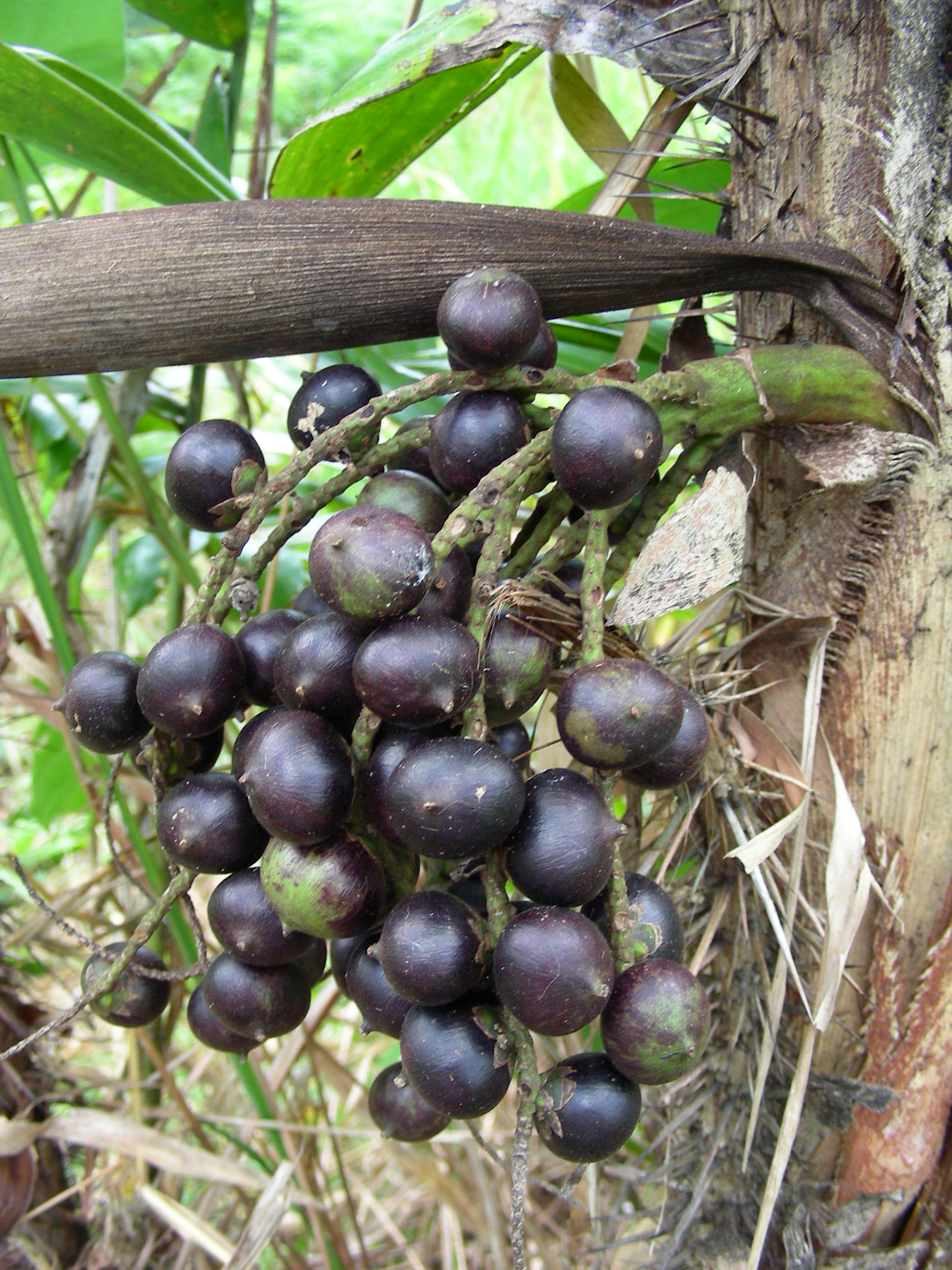
Infrutescence

The fruits are smooth, round, purple to black, and up to 1.7 centimetres (0.67 in) in diameter. The mesocarp is juicy. Bactris maraja fruits from March to December.

== Conservation ==
In 2022, the IUCN assessed Bactris maraja as of Least Concern. The population is large, stable, and faces no major threats.

== Uses ==
The fruits are used for human food. The species is also used for animal food, medicine, and fuel.

== Nomenclature ==
In French, the species is known as maraja. In Portuguese, the species is known as marajá. In Spanish, the species is known as chascarrá or cubarro. In Sranan Tongo, the species is known as keskesmaka.
