= Cassia leiandra =

Scientific classification
- Kingdom: Plantae
- Clade: Tracheophytes
- Clade: Angiosperms
- Clade: Eudicots
- Clade: Rosids
- Order: Fabales
- Family: Fabaceae
- Subfamily: Caesalpinioideae
- Genus: Cassia
- Species: C. leiandra

Binomial name
- Cassia leiandra Benth.

Synonyms
- Cassia moschata Benth

Species of flowering plant

Cassia leiandra, the mari-mari, is a species of flowering plant in the family Fabaceae, native to Colombia and Brazil, and introduced to Uganda. Its succulent, bittersweet fruit are frequently sold in markets in the Amazon.
