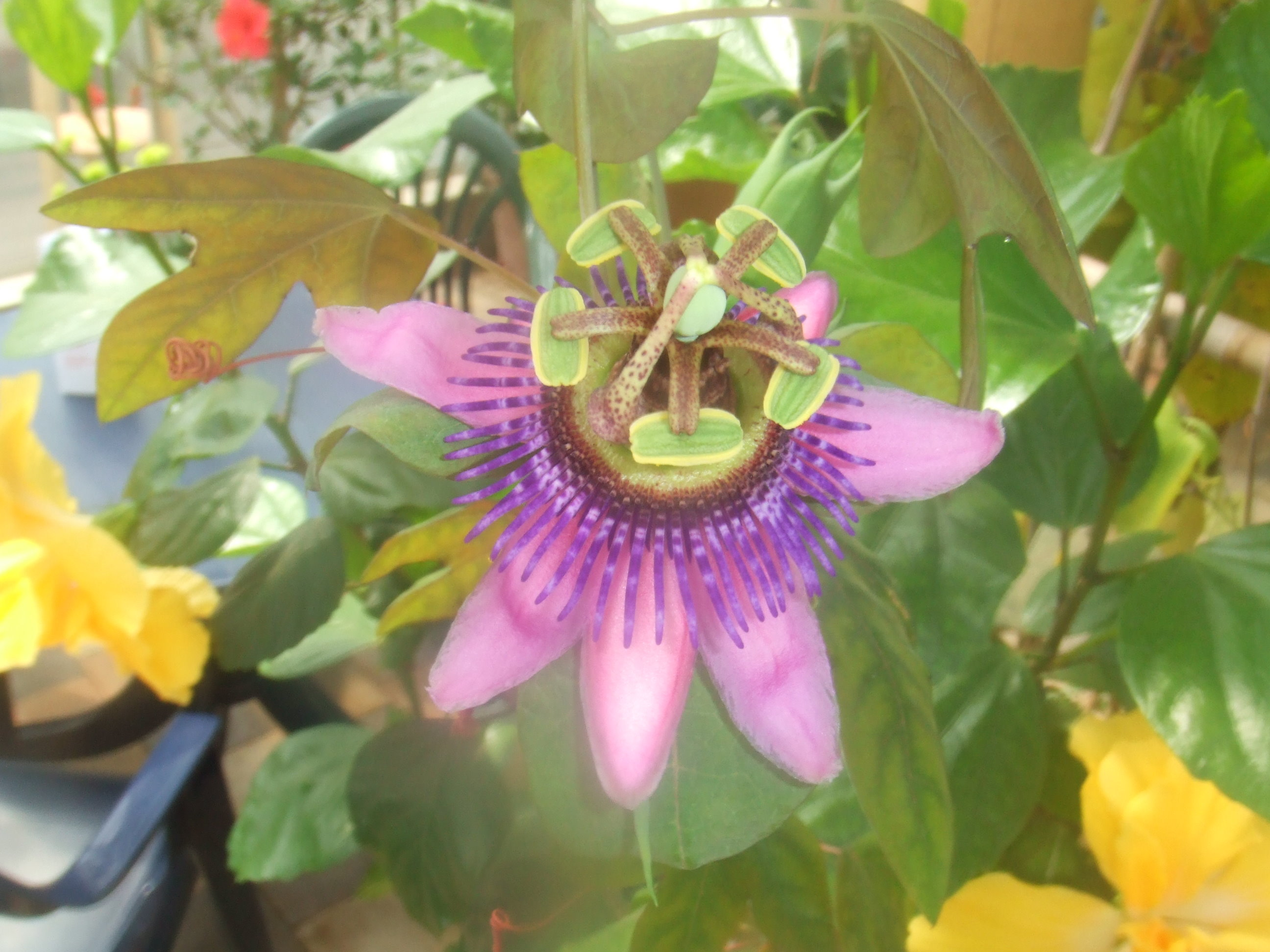
- Passiflora picturata flower

Scientific classification
- Kingdom: Plantae
- Clade: Embryophytes
- Clade: Tracheophytes
- Clade: Angiosperms
- Clade: Eudicots
- Clade: Rosids
- Order: Malpighiales
- Family: Passifloraceae
- Genus: Passiflora
- Species: P. picturata

Binomial name
- Passiflora picturata Ker Gawl.

= Passiflora picturata =

Species of vine

Passiflora picturata is a species of passion flower in the family Passifloraceae.
