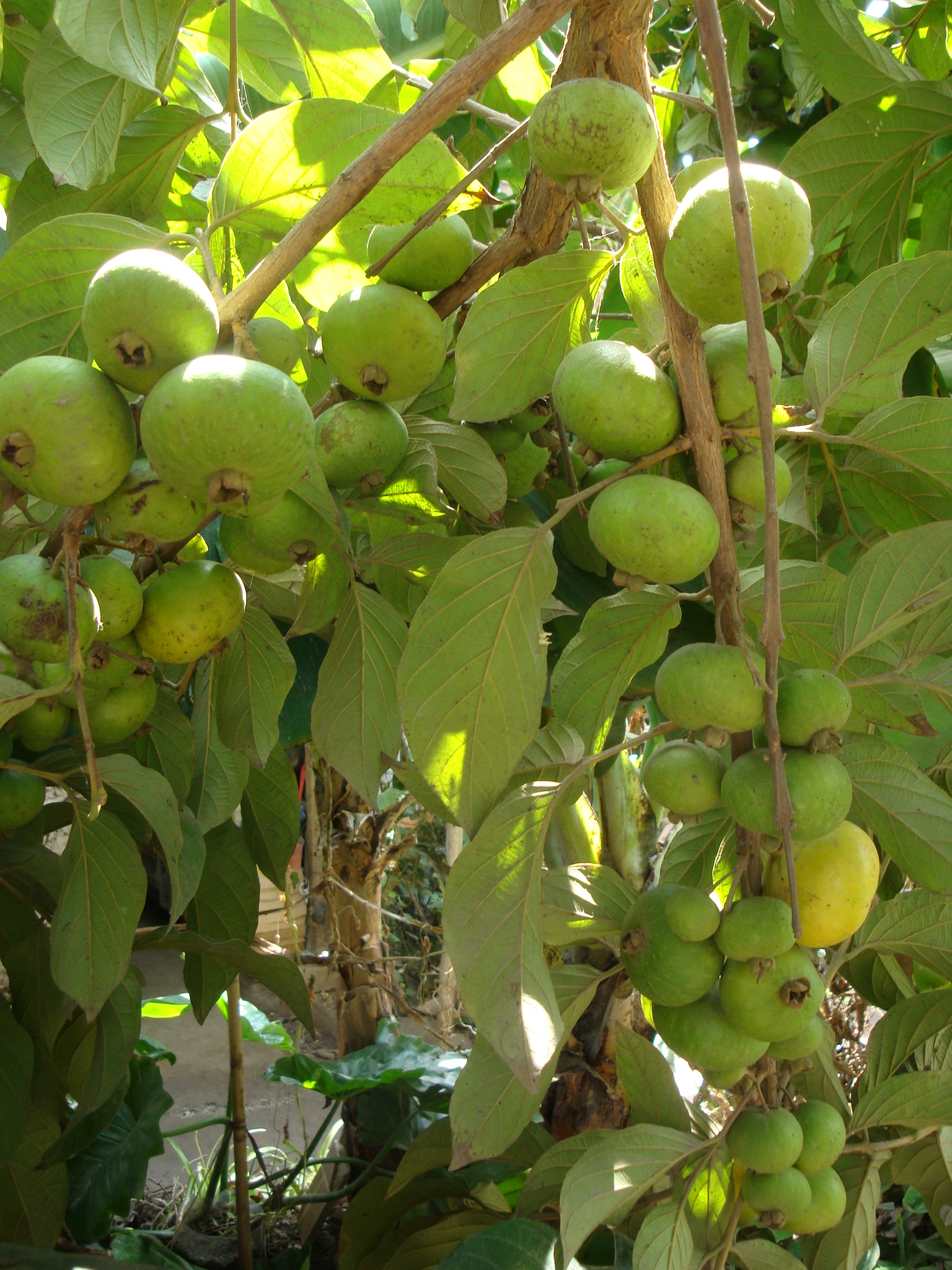

Conservation status
- Least Concern (IUCN 3.1)

Scientific classification
- Kingdom: Plantae
- Clade: Tracheophytes
- Clade: Angiosperms
- Clade: Eudicots
- Clade: Rosids
- Order: Myrtales
- Family: Myrtaceae
- Genus: Campomanesia
- Species: C. lineatifolia

Binomial name
- Campomanesia lineatifolia Ruiz & Pav.

Synonyms
- Psidium lineatifolium (Ruiz & Pav.) Pers.; Campomanesia cornifolia Kunth; Campomanesia rivularis (Mart. ex DC.) Nied.; Psidium rivulare Mart. ex DC.

= Campomanesia lineatifolia =

Species of plant

Campomanesia lineatifolia is a species of plant in the family Myrtaceae. Common names include guabiraba and perfume guava.

== Description ==
It is an evergreen tree with edible fruit that typically reaches 5 – 10 m in height. The fruits are berries (3 – 6 cm diameter, up to 140 g weight) and are gathered from trees growing either wild or under cultivation. The aromatic yellow fruit is eaten raw, made into juices, or pulped for use. A perfume can be extracted from the leaves. An early illustration of the fruit was made in the mid-seventeenth century by Dorothea Eliza Smith.

It has been used in traditional medicine to alleviate gastrointestinal disorders.

== Distribution and habitat ==
It is found in western South America - central and northern Brazil, Peru, Colombia, and Ecuador. It grows in regions with an average temperature of 22 – 30 °C with annual rainfall above 1,500 mm.
