= Inga cinnamomea =

Conservation status
- Least Concern (IUCN 2.3)

Scientific classification
- Kingdom: Plantae
- Clade: Tracheophytes
- Clade: Angiosperms
- Clade: Eudicots
- Clade: Rosids
- Order: Fabales
- Family: Fabaceae
- Subfamily: Caesalpinioideae
- Clade: Mimosoid clade
- Genus: Inga
- Species: I. cinnamomea

Binomial name
- Inga cinnamomea Spruce ex Benth.

Species of legume

Inga cinnamomea is a species of plant in the family Fabaceae. It is distributed from Colombia to Bolivia, including Amazonian Brazil. The common name ingá-guaçú (giant inga) is in reference to the very large fruit pod.
