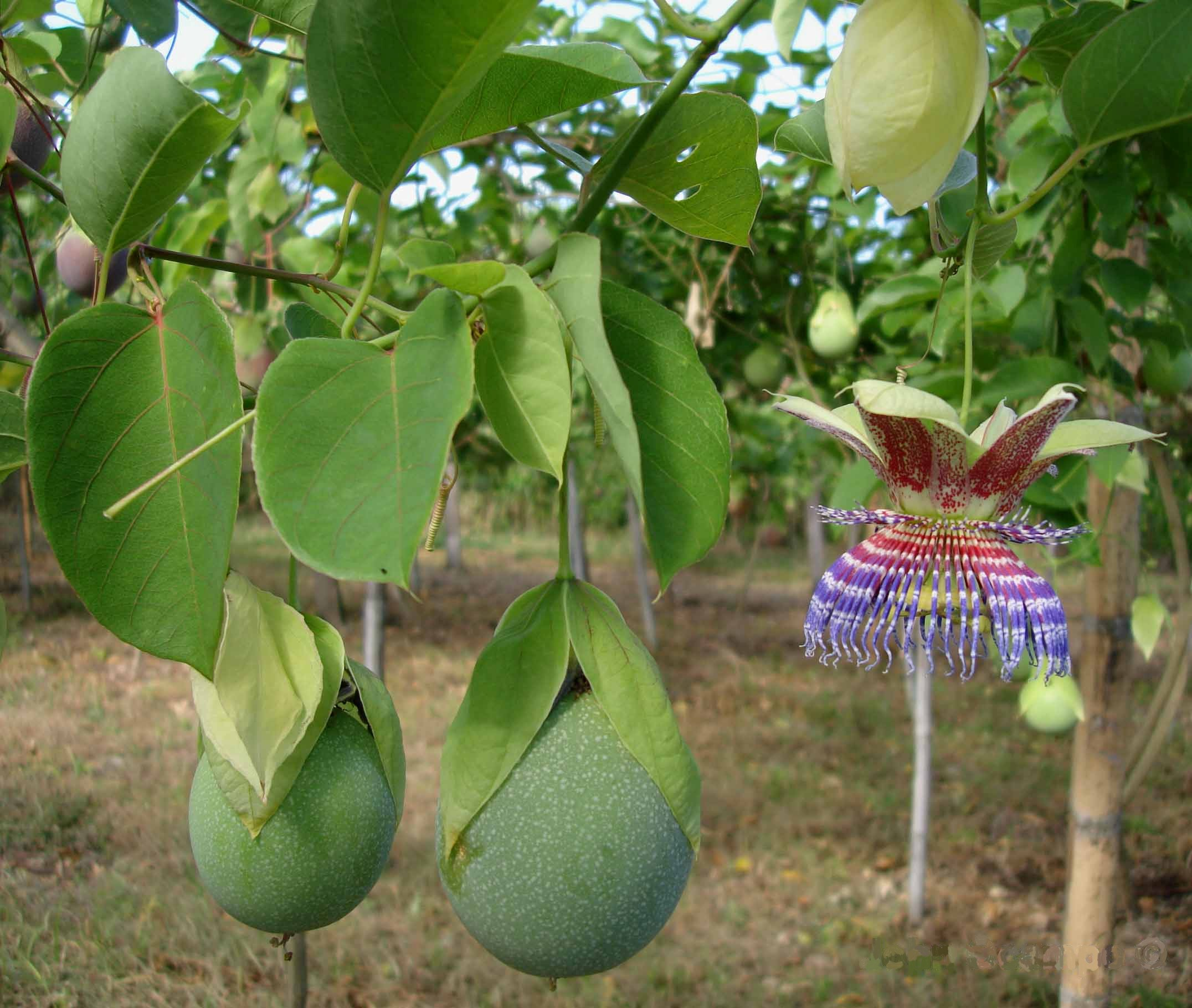
- Passiflora maliformis fruits

Scientific classification
- Kingdom: Plantae
- Clade: Tracheophytes
- Clade: Angiosperms
- Clade: Eudicots
- Clade: Rosids
- Order: Malpighiales
- Family: Passifloraceae
- Genus: Passiflora
- Species: P. maliformis

Binomial name
- Passiflora maliformis L.

= Passiflora maliformis =

Species of flowering plant

Sweet calabash, arils, raw
Nutritional value per 100 g (3.5 oz)
- Energy: 174 kJ (42 kcal)
- Carbohydrates: 10.80 g
- Dietary fiber: 3.63 g
- Fat: 0.45 g
- Protein: 2.20 g
Vitamins and minerals
| Minerals | Quantity %DV^{†} |
| Calcium | 4% 54.33 mg |
| Copper | 12% 0.11 mg |
| Iron | 7% 1.22 mg |
| Magnesium | 40% 170.00 mg |
| Phosphorus | 19% 237.5 mg |
| Potassium | 12% 362.50 mg |
| Sodium | 2% 39.17 mg |
| Zinc | 4% 0.46 mg |
- Other constituents: Quantity
- Water: 85.44 g
- Source (PDF)
- ^{†}Percentages estimated using US recommendations for adults, except for potassium, which is estimated based on expert recommendation from the National Academies

Passiflora maliformis, the sweet calabash, conch apple, wild purple passionfruit, or sweet cup, is a smallish (5 cm or 2 in) passionfruit with purple, yellow or green skin and a greyed-yellow to orange pulp that is aromatically scented and flavoured. It is a fast-growing vine, growing best in somewhat cooler-than-tropical climates. The rind is particularly hard and tougher than most passionfruits. It is usually eaten fresh or used to flavour drinks. It is a native to the Caribbean, Central America and Northern South America.

== Description ==
Passiflora maliformis is a fast-growing evergreen shrub and vine. The slender, woody stems can reach lengths of 3–10 metres (10–33 ft) and are equipped with tendrils by means of which the plant climbs other plants or structures for support. The green or orange-green fruit is up to 5 cm (2.0 in) in diameter. The skin of this fruit can be hard so a hammer is sometimes needed to open it for consumption.

== Cultivation ==
It is usually grown from seeds but may also be propagated by stem-cuttings and layering. Grafting onto other Passiflora rootstock can improve hardiness. Passiflora maliformis grows in the warm, wet tropics the plants require a temperature no lower than around 16 °C (61 °F) when they are flowering in order to ensure fruit set. Passiflora species tend to flower and fruit more freely when grown in soils of only moderate fertility. Seedlings can commence fruiting when only 1–2 years old. Plants in this genus are notably resistant to honey fungus.

== Nutrition ==
Passiflora maliformis arils contain 85.44% water, 7.17% net carbohydrates, 3.63% fibre, 2.2% protein, and 0.45% fat (see table). A 100-gram (3.5 oz) amount provides 42 kilocalories (180 kJ) and is an excellent source of magnesium and phosphorus as well as a significant source of other minerals (see table). The fruit also contains various organic acids and phenolic compounds which are responsible for the aroma and flavour. It is commonly eaten raw or made into a drink, and is said to have a flavor similar to grape.
