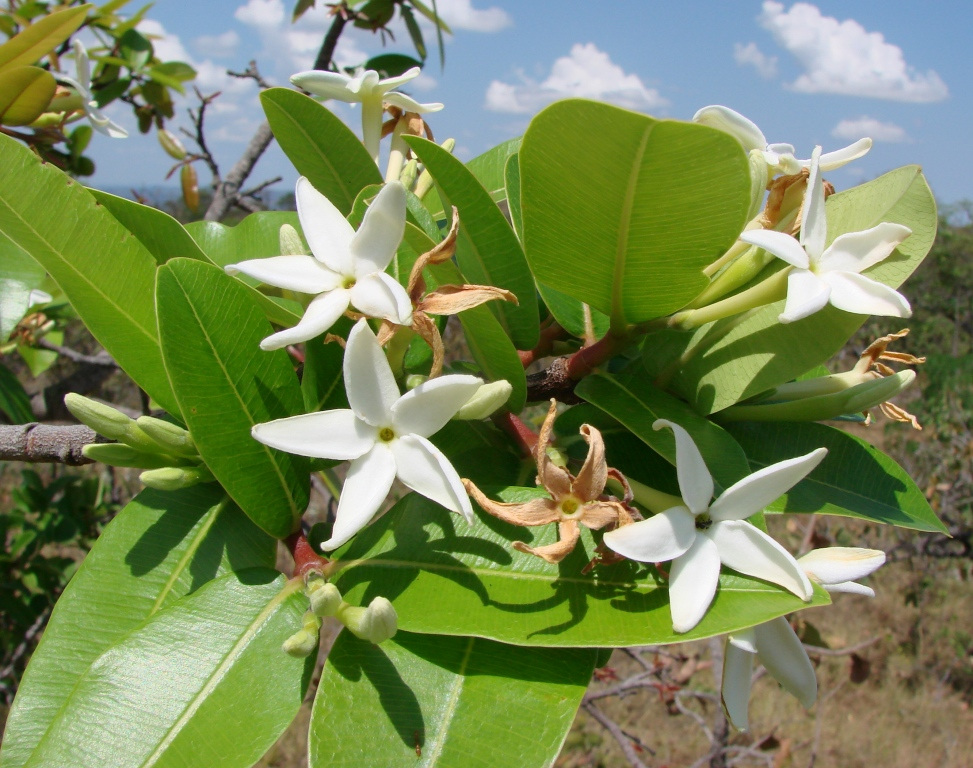
- Hancornia speciosa
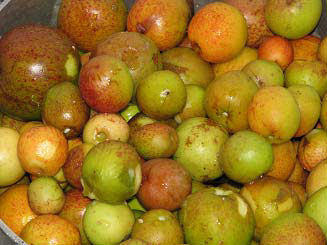

Scientific classification
- Kingdom: Plantae
- Clade: Tracheophytes
- Clade: Angiosperms
- Clade: Eudicots
- Clade: Asterids
- Order: Gentianales
- Family: Apocynaceae
- Subfamily: Rauvolfioideae
- Tribe: Willughbeieae
- Subtribe: Lacmelleinae
- Genus: Hancornia; Gomes
- Species: H. speciosa

Binomial name
- Hancornia speciosa Gomes

Synonyms
- Echites glaucus Roem. & Schult.; Hancornia pubescens Nees & Mart.; Willughbeia pubescens (Nees & Mart.) Mart.; Hancornia gardneri (A.DC.) Miers

= Hancornia =

Species of plant

Hancornia is a genus of flowering plant in the family Apocynaceae, first described as a genus in 1812. It is native to South America (Brazil, Peru, Bolivia, Paraguay). It contains only one known species, Hancornia speciosa, commonly called mangabeira, which produces fruits known as mangabas.
