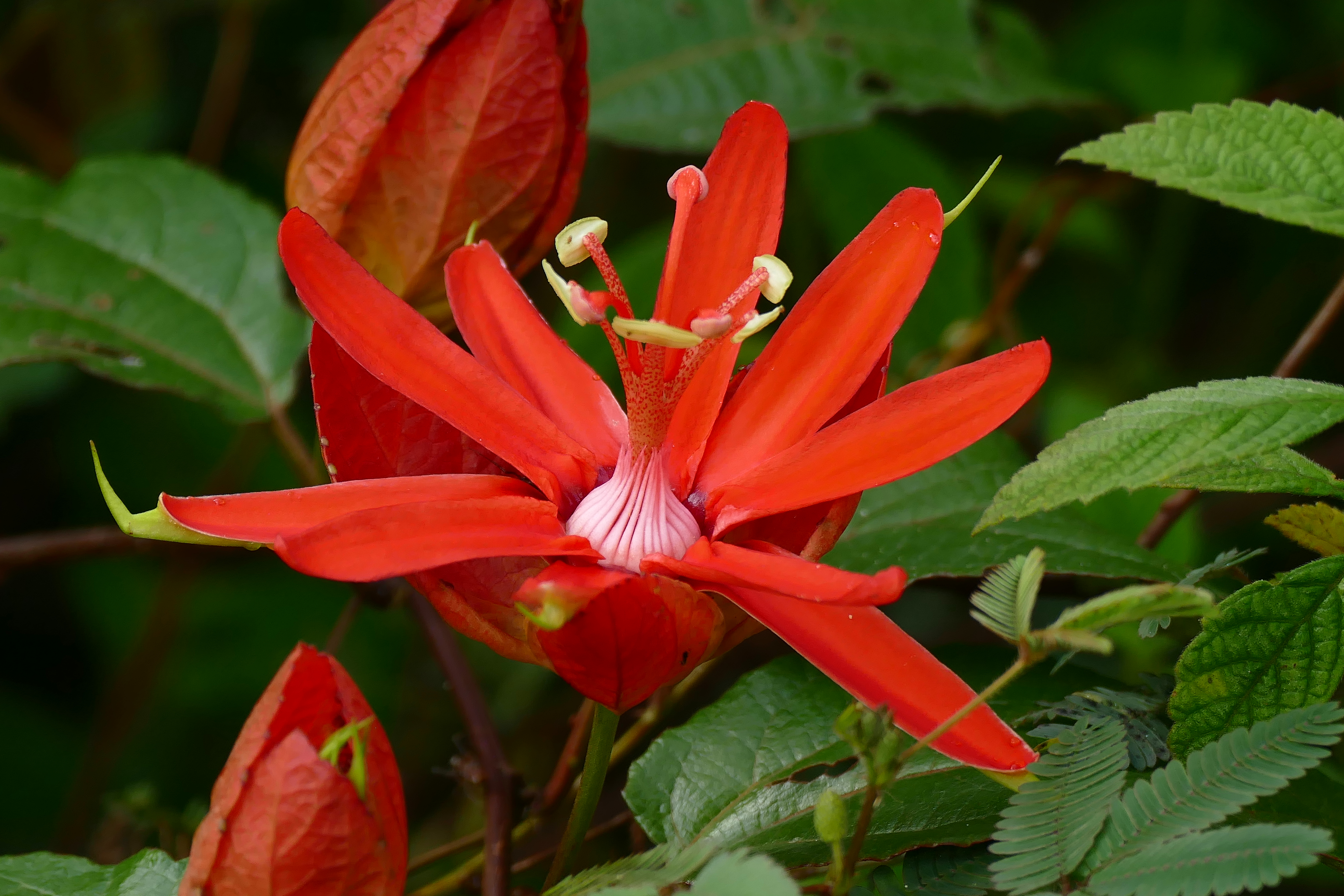

Scientific classification
- Kingdom: Plantae
- Clade: Tracheophytes
- Clade: Angiosperms
- Clade: Eudicots
- Clade: Rosids
- Order: Malpighiales
- Family: Passifloraceae
- Genus: Passiflora
- Species: P. coccinea

Binomial name
- Passiflora coccinea Aubl.

Synonyms
- P. coccinea var. minor Mast.; P. coccinea var. velutina (DC.) Mast.; P. fulgens Wallis ex E. Morren; P. toxicaria Barb. Rodr.; P. velutina DC.; Tacsonia coccinea Barb. Rodr.; Tacsonia pubescens DC.

= Passiflora coccinea =

Species of vine

Passiflora coccinea (common names scarlet passion flower, red passion flower) is a fast-growing vine. The vine is native to northern South America. It produces edible fruit.

Most plants cultivated as Passiflora coccinea turn out to be Passiflora miniata Vanderpl.
