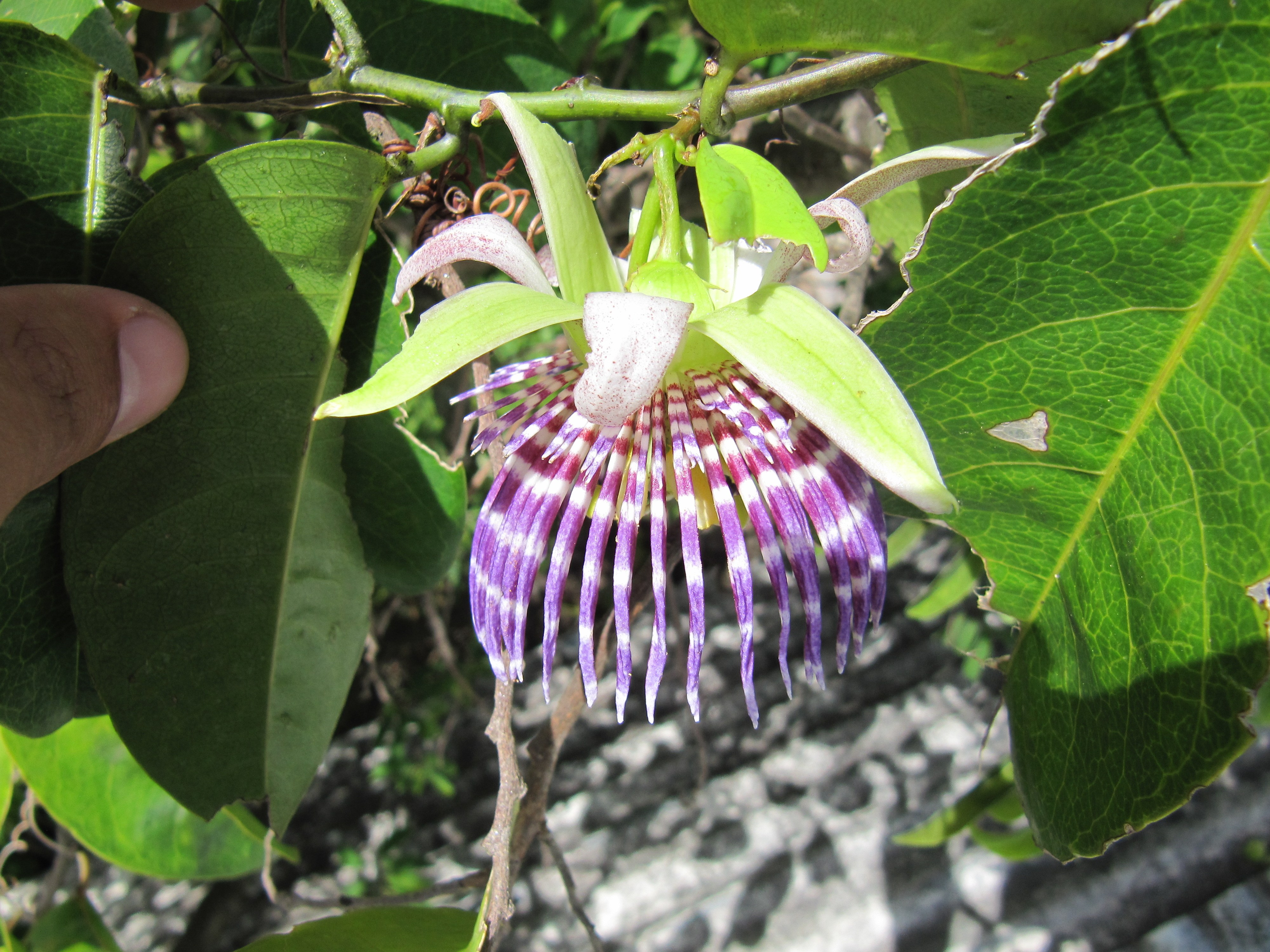
- Flower
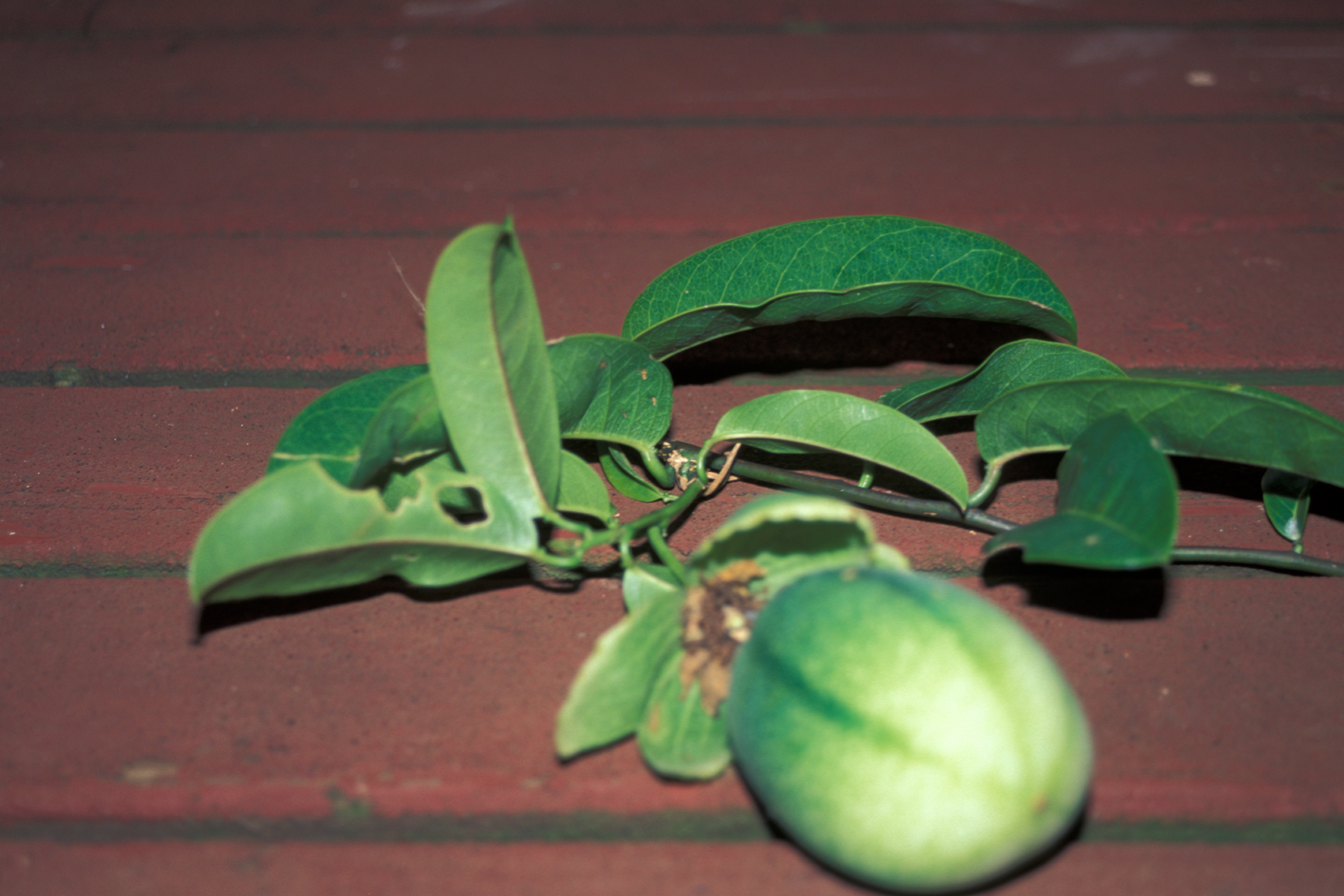
- Fruit

Scientific classification
- Kingdom: Plantae
- Clade: Tracheophytes
- Clade: Angiosperms
- Clade: Eudicots
- Clade: Rosids
- Order: Malpighiales
- Family: Passifloraceae
- Genus: Passiflora
- Species: P. laurifolia

Binomial name
- Passiflora laurifolia L.

= Passiflora laurifolia =

Species of vine

Passiflora laurifolia, commonly known as the water lemon, Jamaican honeysuckle, golden bellapple, pomme liane on Martinique & Guadeloupe and orange lilikoi (not to be confused with yellow lilikoi, or simply lilikoi, is the name given to passiflora edulis v. flavicarpa for the valley where it first grew in Hawai'i), is a species in the family Passifloraceae. It is native to tropical Americas, and has spread to other parts of the world. As a tropical species, water lemon will not tolerate any frost. Water lemon is only occasionally cultivated, but the fruits are usually available in markets wherever the vine grows in wild. It is not widely known outside those regions.

The fruit is medium-sized, ovoid in shape, about 2 in (5.1 cm) long with a diameter of 3 in (7.6 cm), with a green or deep orange skin and white-yellow, extremely juicy pulp.

The water lemon has an excellent mild, perfumed taste, without the tartness of the common Passionfruit. It grows on a vigorous vine up to 30 feet long. Growing better in slightly humid climates, the vine is not particular about soil or water requirements, other than liking ground moisture year-round. It is almost always grown from seeds, but can be propagated by cuttings. Bottom-heating the seeds at 70–80 °F (21–27 °C) can result in germination at 1–2 weeks; at lower temperatures, seeds can take up to 10 weeks to germinate. The fruits are eaten fresh, or used in drinks and beverages.

Waterlemon Cay in the Virgin Islands is named after the fruit.

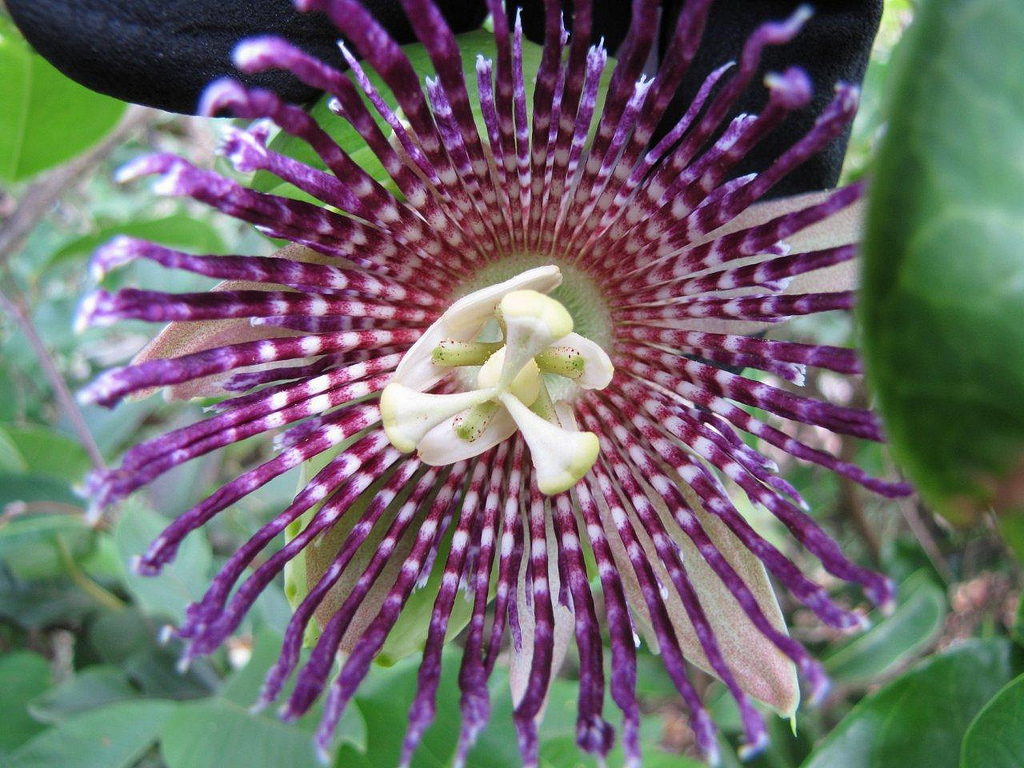
Flower

== Morphology ==
=== Habit ===
Woody, perennial, glabrous lianas.

=== Leaves ===
Oblong-elliptic or elliptic, rounded at the base, subcoriaceous. They measure 6–12.5 cm in length and 3.5–8 cm in width, with entire margins. The petiole is hairy and 5–15 mm long. Stipules are linear and 3–5 mm long.

=== Flowers ===
Solitary. Sepals are oblong, greenish or reddish, and 2–2.5 cm long. Petals are oblong, greenish or reddish, and 2 cm long. The corona is arranged in two rows, red-blue-purple, and 20–40 mm long.

=== Fruit ===
Ovoid in shape. They measure 5–8 cm in length.

== See also ==
- List of Passiflora species
