= Lancetilla Botanical Garden =

Garden

Lancetilla Botanical Garden & Research Center
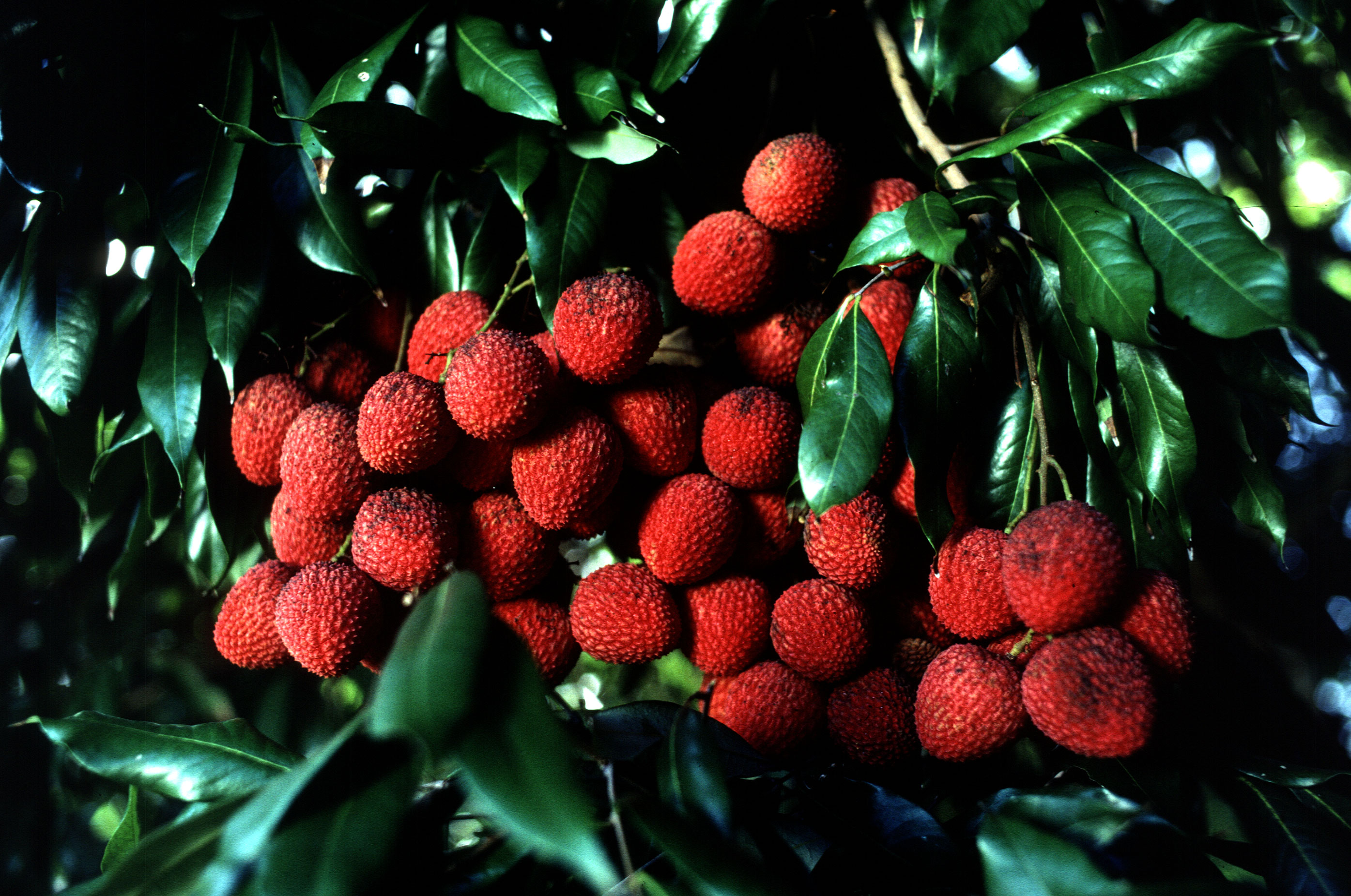
- Lychee tree with its fruits.
- Interactive map of Lancetilla Botanical Garden & Research Center
- Coordinates: 15°41′00″N 87°25′00″W
- Area: 1,681 hectares (4,150 acres)
- Created: 1925
- Website: jardinbotanicolancetilla.negocio.site

Lancetilla Botanical Garden is a botanical garden and significant tourist attraction located on the coast of the Caribbean Sea, in the north of the Republic of Honduras, about 7 km southeast of the city of Tela.

== History ==
The Lancetilla Botanical Garden or more appropriately Lancetilla Botanical Garden and Research Center was for a long time the only botanical garden in Honduras (until the UNAH botanical garden was opened in 2005) and one of the largest in Latin America. The Botanical Garden is a department of the National University of Forest Sciences (UNACIFOR). The botanical garden is part of the BGCI and presents works for the International Agenda for Conservation in Botanical Gardens. Its international recognition code as a botanical institution, as well as its herbarium acronym is LANCE.

== Garden Collection ==
It has an extension of 1681 hectares, of which 1261 ha are from a Nature reserve, 350 are from plantations and 70 ha correspond to an Arboretum. The collection includes about 1500 species focused mainly on tropical plants with fruits.

- Arboretum with an extension of 70 hectares, and with more than 1,500 species, mainly fruit trees and timber trees from tropical areas around the world.
- A virgin forest of the Nature Reserve, with about 1,200 hectares, in the Río Lancetilla basin, south of the plantations, which has been protected and continues to be conserved, as it is the source of water supply for the city of Tela.
- The experimental plantations, with an extension of 350 hectares. In the 1930s, hundreds of hectares of plantations began planting mostly Mahogany (Swietenia macrophylla), Teca (Tectona grandis), White teak (Gmelina arborea), Tectona grandis, in areas near Tela. The last remains of these plantations with about 100 hectares exist in the botanical garden and are currently used as seed trees.
- Collection of bananas—one of the richest and most diverse in the world
- Collection of fruit trees from Asia with a total of 636 species from 392 Genera and 107 families. Such as Garcinia mangostana (mangosteen), Lecythis elliptica and Lecythis pisonis (sapucaia), Terminalia arjuna (arjuna), Citrus species, Pimenta acris, Canarium ovatum (pili nut), Theobroma cacao (cocoa), Nephrelium mutabile (pulasan), Litchi chinensis (lychees), Eucalyptus deglupta, Khaya ivorensis, Nephelium lappaceum (rambutan), Mangifera indica (mango), Myristica fragrans (nutmeg), Eugenia dombeyi (grumichama), Myrciaria cauliflora (jabuticaba), Cybistax donnell-smithii also known as Duranga (Mexico), San Juan (Honduras), Palo blanco (Guatemala), Cortez, Cortez blanco (El Salvador).
- Collection of Palms with Elaeis guineensis (African oil palm), Roystonea regia (royal palm).
- Orchid collection,
- Bamboo collection,
- 200 hectares of plantations are used for different studies by the "National School of Forest Sciences".

== Facilities ==
Several administrative and research buildings mostly preserve architectural style of the 1930s and 1940s, when the Garden was owned by the banana company United Fruit Company. Herbarium with specimens from all over the area is located here. There is also a cafeteria with restaurant and accommodation for up to 30 people.

== See also ==
- Lancetilla
- Haptanthus
