= Sapucaia =

Sapucaia may refer to:

== Botany ==
- Lecythis pisonis, a tree of the family Lecythidaceae, also known as cream nut or monkey pot
- Sterculia striata, a tree of the family Malvaceae, also known as chicá-do-cerrado

== Geography ==
- Sapucaia, Pará, a municipality in the state of Pará;
- Sapucaia, Rio de Janeiro, a municipality in the state of Rio de Janeiro;
- Sapucaia do Sul, a municipality in the state of Rio Grande do Sul
