= Cream nut =

Cream nut is a common name for several trees from the tropical Americas which produce edible nuts, and may refer to:

- Bertholletia excelsa
- Lecythis, especially:
  - Lecythis pisonis
