= Lecythis ollaria =

Conservation status
- Least Concern (IUCN 2.3)

Scientific classification
- Kingdom: Plantae
- Clade: Tracheophytes
- Clade: Angiosperms
- Clade: Eudicots
- Clade: Asterids
- Order: Ericales
- Family: Lecythidaceae
- Genus: Lecythis
- Species: L. ollaria

Binomial name
- Lecythis ollaria Loefl.

Species of tree

Lecythis ollaria (paradise nut) is a species of tree found growing in forests in Brazil, Guyana, and Venezuela. The tree is known locally as coco de mono, and accumulates selenium in its tissues.

== Description ==
It is a large rainforest tree growing to 20–30 m (70–100 ft) tall with spreading branches; it is in the same family (Lecythidaceae) as the Brazil nut (Bertholletia excelsa) and has similar fruit. This is a large woody capsule up to 30 cm (12 in) diameter and very heavy, with a lid which bursts open when the seeds are ripe. Monkeys are said to put their hands inside the capsule in order to extract the seeds which have a fleshy interior rich in oil and a woody outer casing.

== Toxicity ==
The nuts have a pleasant flavour and are eaten by humans. When two previously healthy women in South America developed unexplained nausea, vomiting and neurological symptoms, followed two weeks later by heavy hair loss, no cause could at first be found. It was later established that they were suffering from acute selenium toxicity brought on by eating paradise nuts. They still had elevated levels of selenium in their blood eight weeks after they had eaten the nuts. Further investigation of the tree found that the tissues of the bark, leaves, capsules and seeds all contained selenium but that the highest concentration was in the nuts which contained about five grams per kilogram, about half of which was soluble in water. The tree is considered to be a selenium accumulator and part of the element is bound to very selenium-rich proteins.

== Status ==
The IUCN Red List of Threatened Species lists the paradise nut as being of least concern. This is because it has a widespread geographical distribution in the tropical rainforest.
