= Loefling Zoo =

Loefling Zoo Parque Zoológico Loefling
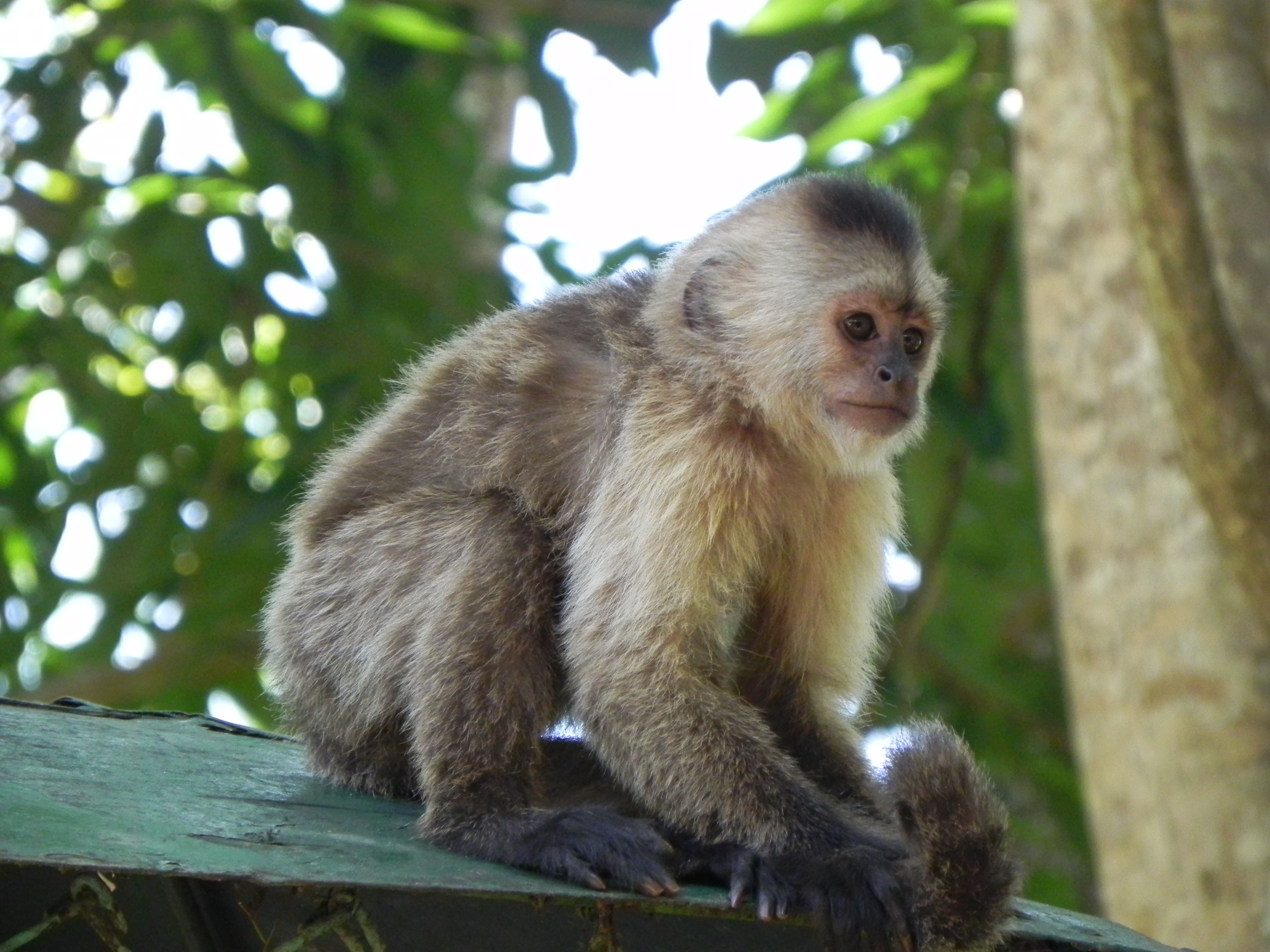
- Interactive map of Loefling Zoo; Parque Zoológico Loefling
- 8°17′44″N 62°42′12″W
- Location: Ciudad Guayana, Venezuela

The Loefling Zoo (Spanish: Zoológico Loefling) Also Zoological Park Loefling (Spanish: Parque Zoológico Loefling) was a publicly owned zoological garden located southwest of Cachamay Park, in Ciudad Guayana, part of the Bolivar State in the Venezuelan Guayana region. It received its name in honor of the Swedish botanist Pehr Löfling. He was one of the first to make the fauna and flora of this region known to science, and he died near Ciudad Guayana.

Its administration and management were the responsibility of the state-owned Venezuelan Guiana Corporation (CVG, Corporación Venezolana de Guayana) under the supervision of the National Foundation of Zoological Parks and Aquariums of Venezuela. (ZOO-AC-V015)

Among the species that could previously be seen in this park are: the Orinoco caiman, monkeys, deer, barnacles, chiguires (capybara), babas, baculi, reptiles, morrocoyes (tortoises) and many other species that inhabit there, some in controlled captivity and others in shape natural.

You could also see trees like mahogany, samanes, araguaneyes, apamates, oaks and ceibas.

The place is currently abandoned.

== Gallery ==
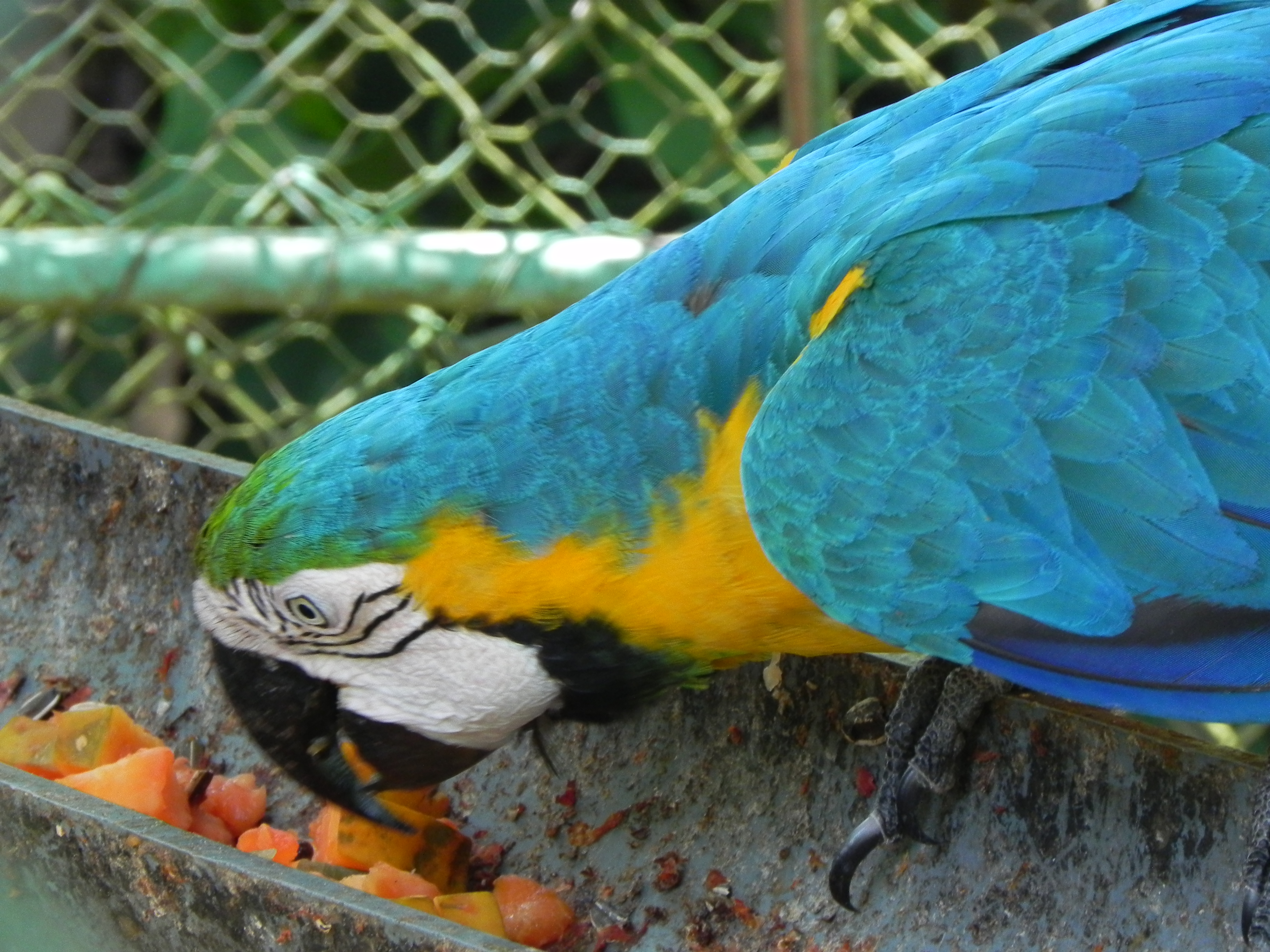

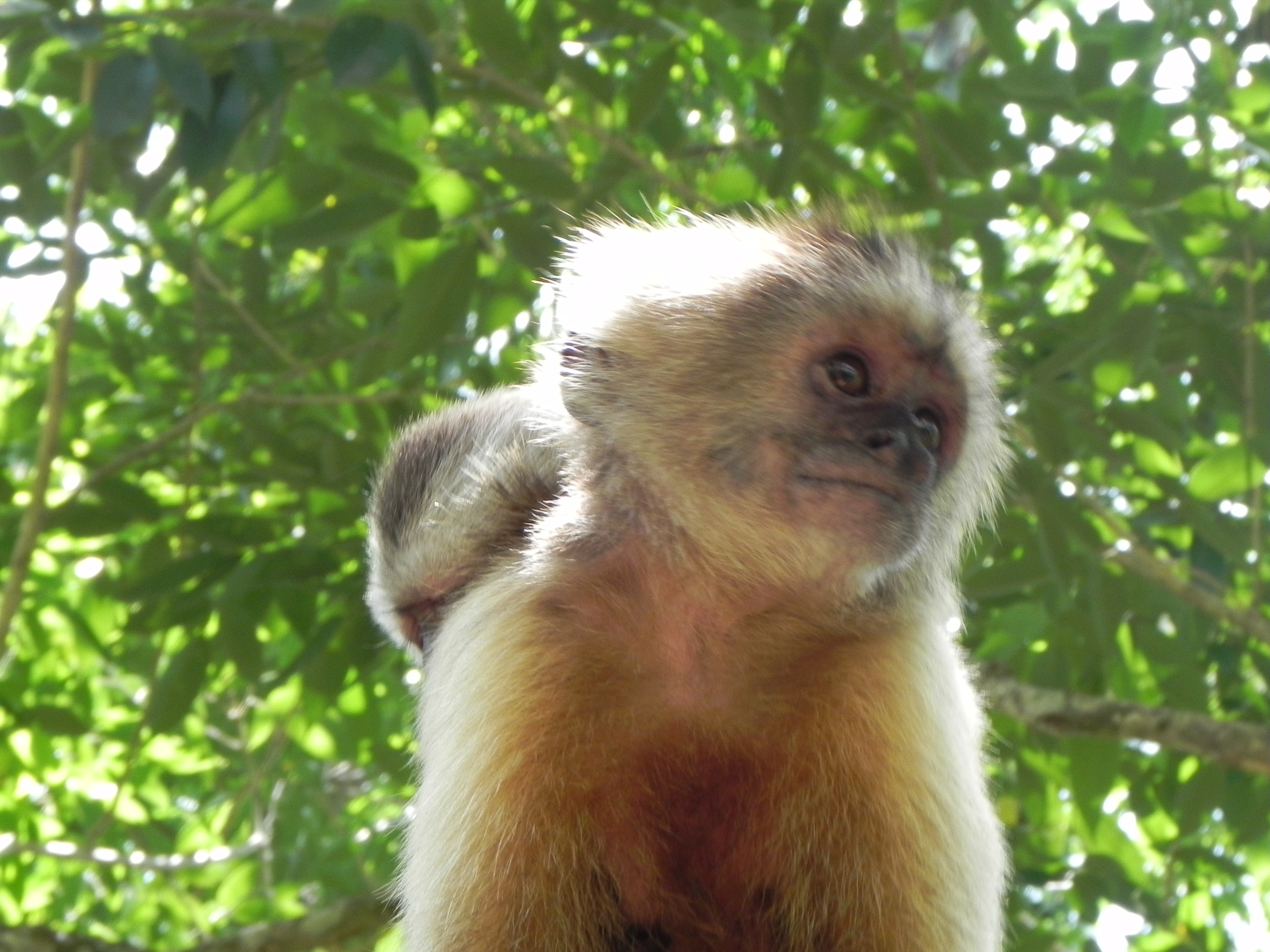

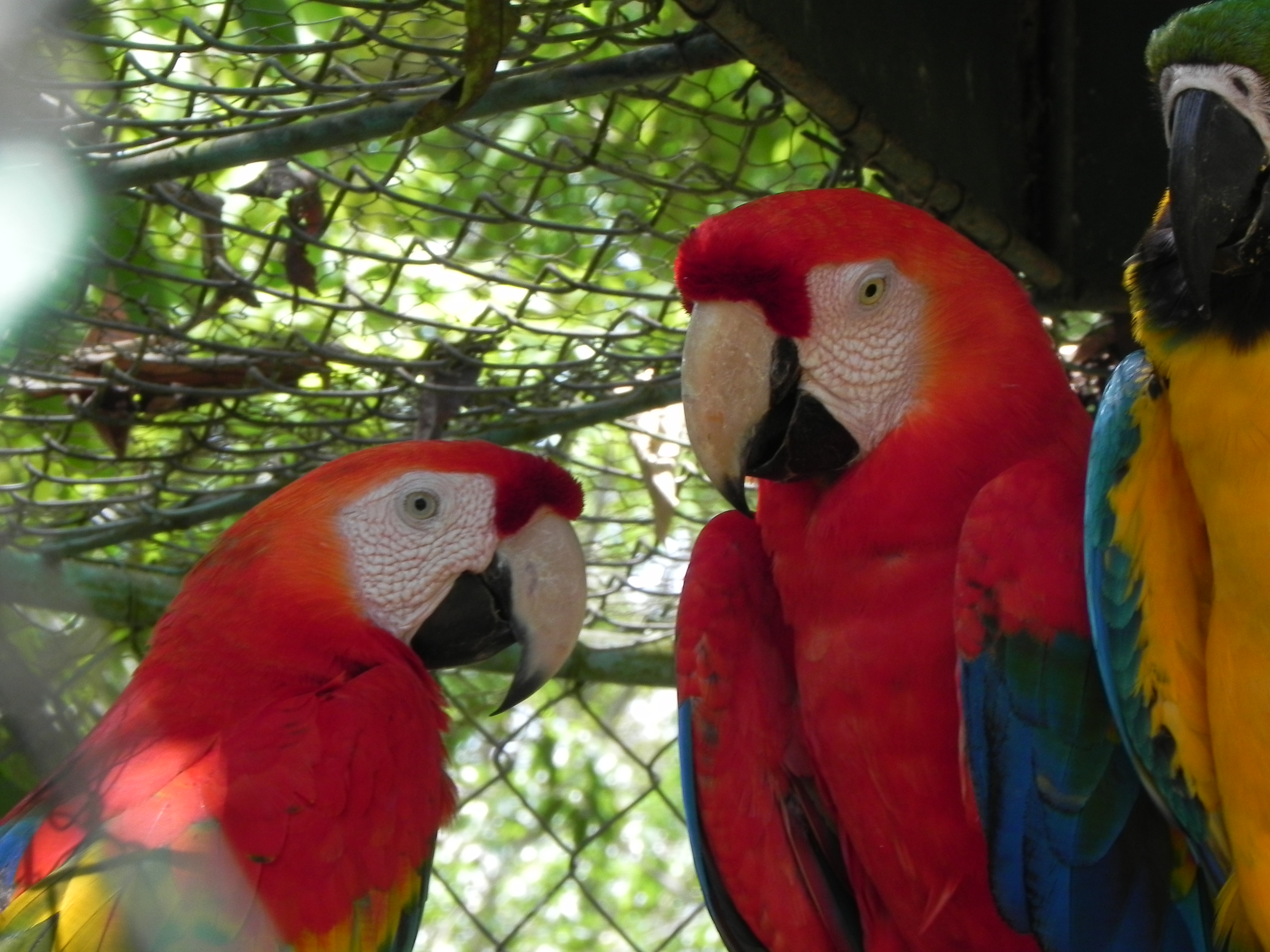

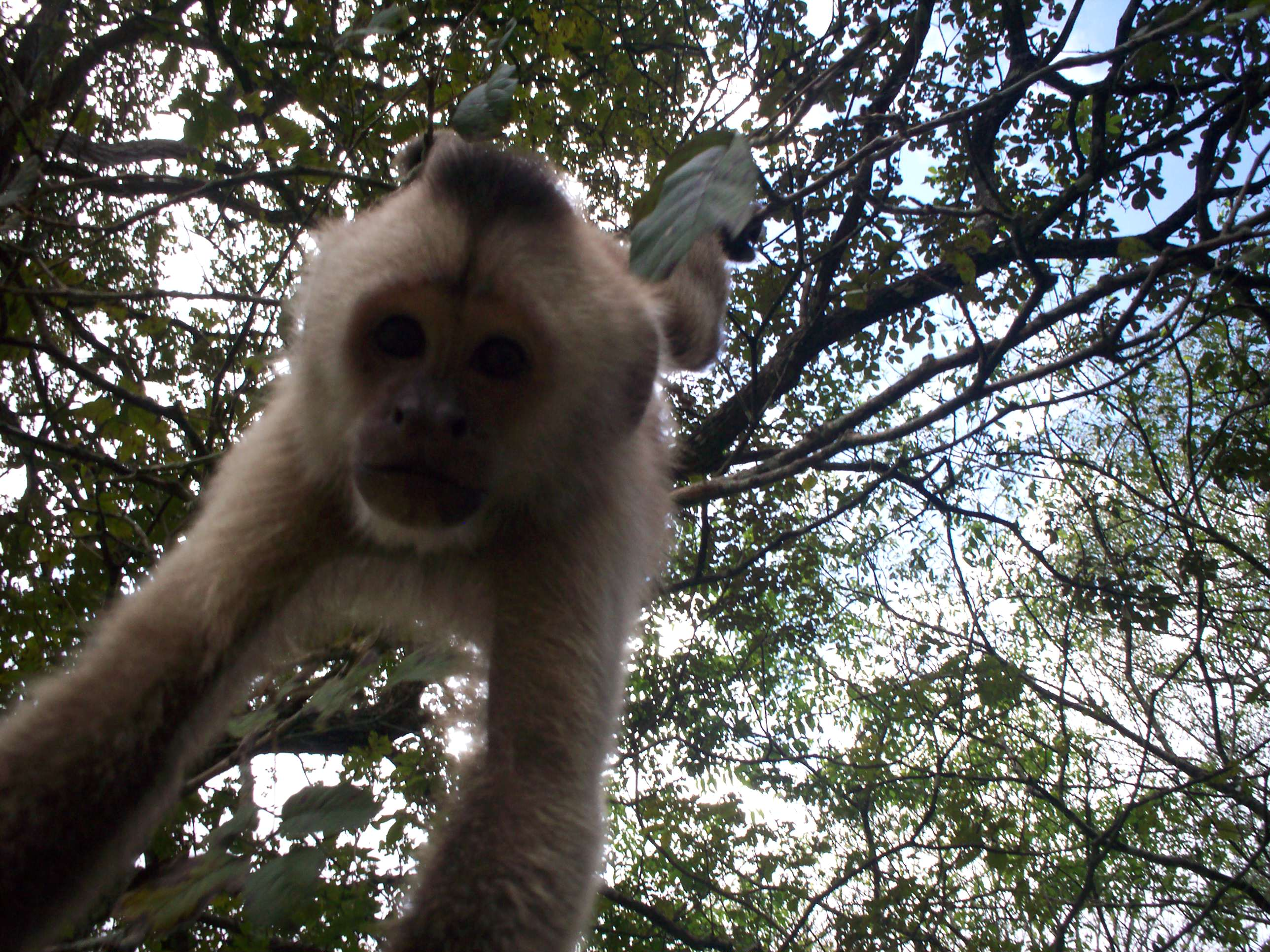

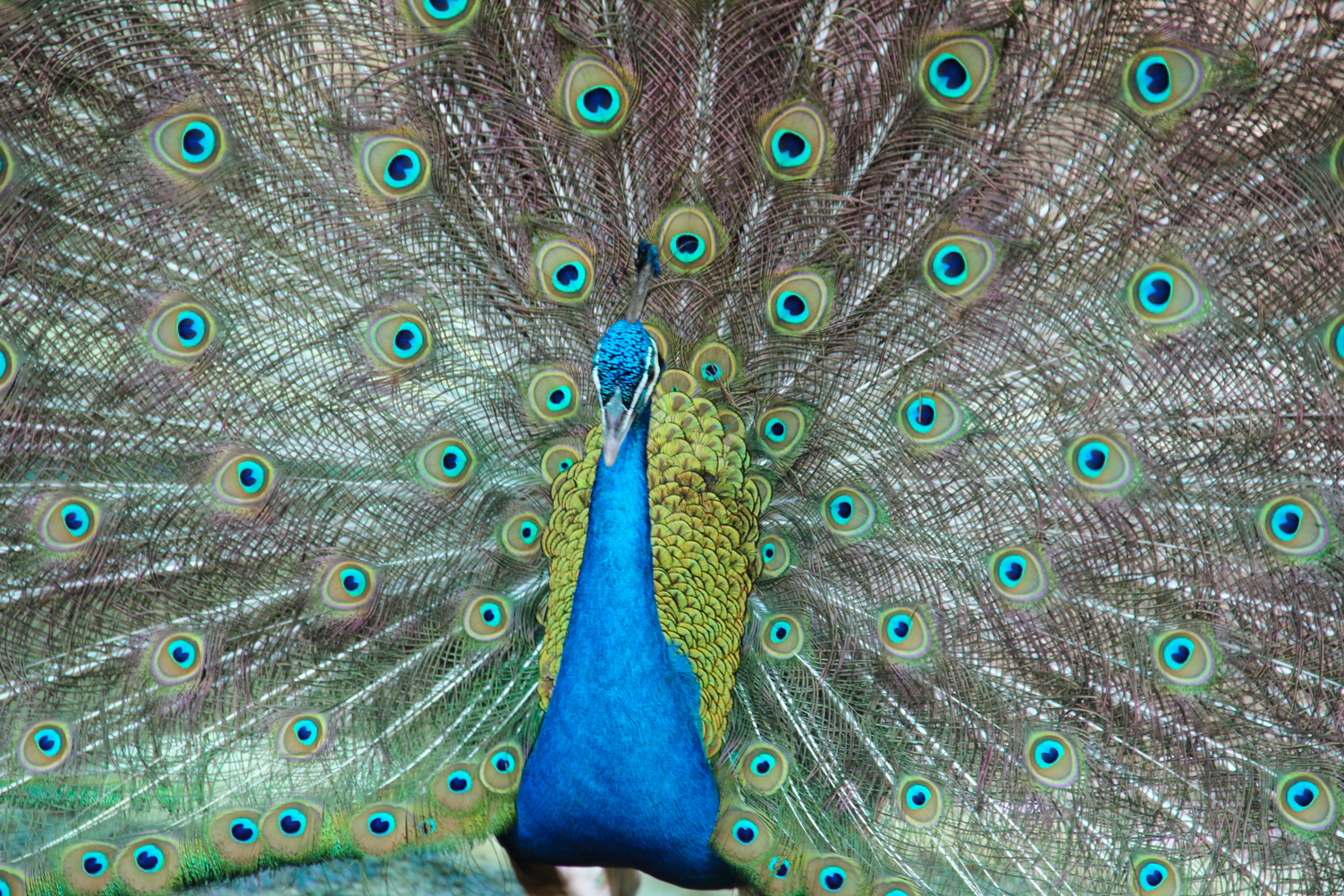

== See also ==
- List of national parks of Venezuela
- Las Delicias Zoo
