= Lecythis poiteaui =

Scientific classification
- Kingdom: Plantae
- Clade: Tracheophytes
- Clade: Angiosperms
- Clade: Eudicots
- Clade: Asterids
- Order: Ericales
- Family: Lecythidaceae
- Genus: Lecythis
- Species: L. poiteaui

Binomial name
- Lecythis poiteaui O.Berg

Species of plant

Lecythis poiteaui (Lecythidaceae) of the Guianas and eastern Brazil, commonly called Jarana Amarela, is a rainforest tree of non-flooding forests, reaching canopy-height (around 40 meters or 130 feet). The leaves are deciduous (dry season), elliptic, to 10.5 inches (26 centimeters) long by up to four inches (10 centimeters) wide, with crenulate edges. Inflorescences unbranched racemes up to 12 inches (30 cm) in length, usually at the tip of branches with 2 to 7 widely spaced, oddly shaped creme de minthe or white flowers, having around 1,000 stamens each. Fruit globose 1.25 inches (three cm) by one inch (2.5 cm) with 4 to 6 brown, aril-covered seeds in each.
