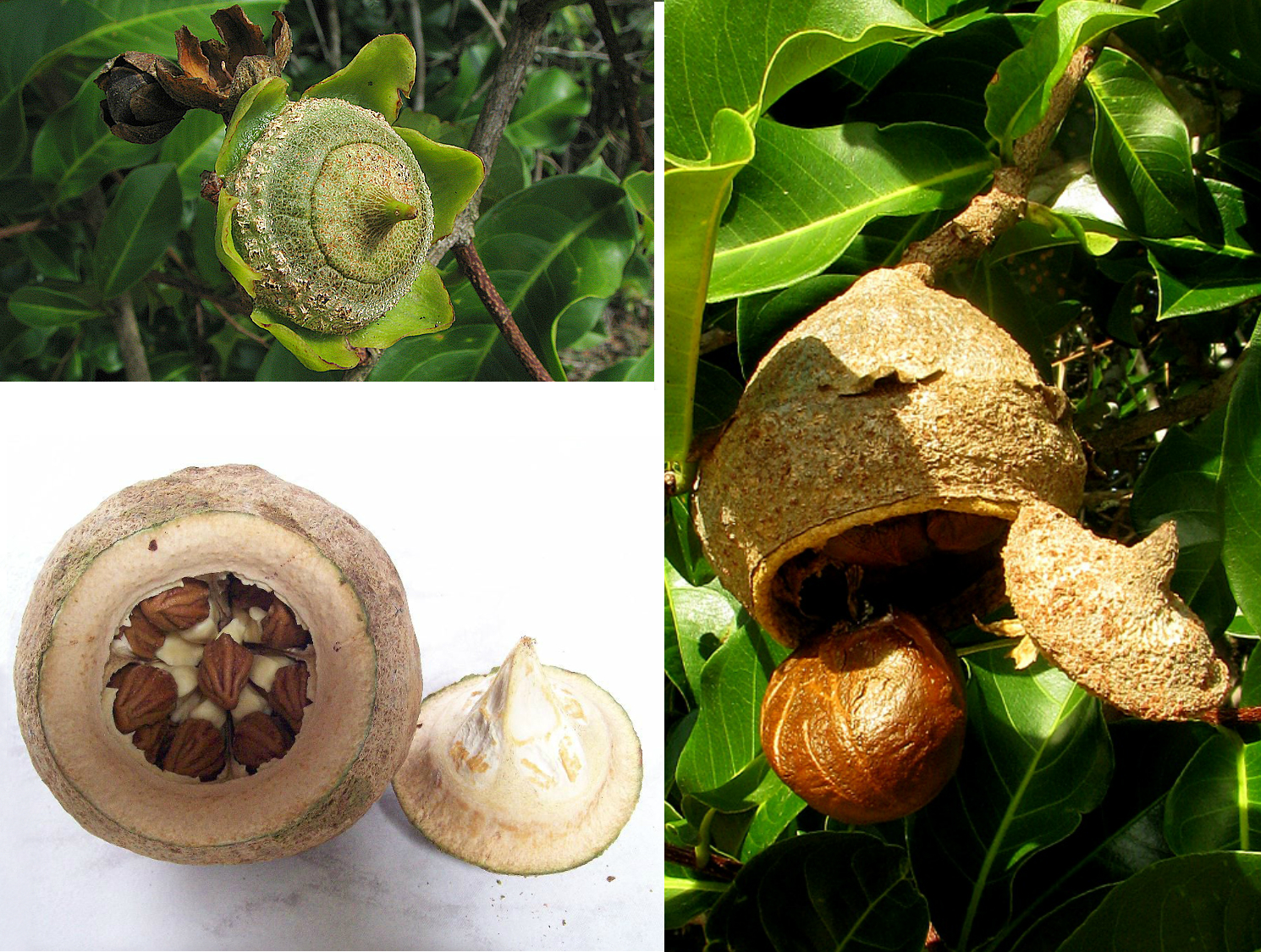
- Lecythis fruits and seeds.

Scientific classification
- Kingdom: Plantae
- Clade: Tracheophytes
- Clade: Angiosperms
- Clade: Eudicots
- Clade: Asterids
- Order: Ericales
- Family: Lecythidaceae
- Subfamily: Lecythidoideae
- Genus: Lecythis; Loefl.

Synonyms
- Bergena Adans.; Cercophora Miers; Chytroma Miers; Holopyxidium Ducke; Sapucaya R.Knuth; Pachylecythis Ledoux

= Lecythis =

Genus of flowering plants

Lecythis (/ˈlɛsɪθɪs/ LESS-ith-iss) is a genus of woody plants in the Lecythidaceae family first described as a genus in 1758. It is native to Central America and South America. Several species produce edible seeds and referred to by a variety of common names including paradise nut, monkey pot, cream nut, and sapucaia nut.

A phylogenetic study published in 2024 by Vargas et al. concluded that Lecythis was polyphyletic. The authors proposed leaving the core Ollaria clade in Lecythis, and placing the Poiteau and Chartacea sections of Lecythis in a revived Chytroma, the Pisonis section in a reinstated Pachylecythis, and the Corrugata clade in the new genus Guaiania.

== Species ==
- Lecythis alutacea – Pará, Suriname, Guyana, Venezuela
- Lecythis ampla – from Nicaragua to Ecuador
- Lecythis barnebyi – Amazonas
- Lecythis brancoensis – Guyana, Roraima
- Lecythis chartacea – Colombia, Venezuela, Guianas, N Brazil
- Lecythis confertiflora – Guianas, N Brazil
- Lecythis corrugata – Venezuela, Guianas, N Brazil
- Lecythis gracieana – Amazonas
- Lecythis holcogyne – Amapá, French Guiana, Guyana
- Lecythis idatimon – from Suriname to Maranhão
- Lecythis lanceolata – Brazil
- Lecythis lurida – Brazil
- Lecythis mesophylla – Costa Rica, Panama, Colombia
- Lecythis minor Jacq. – Venezuela, Panama, Colombia
- Lecythis oldemanii Roosmalen
- Lecythis ollaria L. – Venezuela
- Lecythis parvifructa – Amazonas
- Lecythis persistens – Amapá, French Guiana, Guyana
- Lecythis pisonis – Brazil, Peru
- Lecythis pneumatophora – French Guiana
- Lecythis poiteaui – Fr Guiana, Suriname, N Brazil
- Lecythis praeclara (Sandwith) S.A.Mori ex Molino & Sabatier
- Lecythis prancei – Amazonas
- Lecythis retusa – Amazonas
- Lecythis schomburgkii – Guyana, Roraima
- Lecythis schwackei – Bahia, Rio de Janeiro (state)
- Lecythis serrata – N. Brazil
- Lecythis tuyrana Pittier – Ecuador, Panama, Colombia
- Lecythis zabucajo – Colombia, Venezuela, Guianas, Ecuador, N. Brazil

== Uses ==
The nuts of most Lecythis species are edible. Lecythis zabucajo is perhaps the most important edible species, but the seeds of L. ollaria and L. pisonis are also used.

The fruit is coconut-sized, and roundish and woody, with a cap that pops off when it reaches maturity. Inside the fruit are anywhere from eight to 40 seeds, which eventually fall from the woody capsule after a period of time.

The entire fruit in question is highly curious: It is six inches and more long, about four wide of a thick and woody texture opening at the top like a box with a transverse lid. From the upper side of this lid, a woody column descends to the bottom of the inside of the fruit, and around this column, the large seeds are arranged.

— Sir William Jackson Hooker, Hooker’s Journal of Botany (1849)

The oil extracted from the nuts is tasteless and clear in color. In Brazil it is used for making white soap. It is also burnt as a light source. The wood is used in construction, cabinetry, and the making of tool handles and other wooden items. The seeds are shelled, then eaten raw, roasted or boiled.

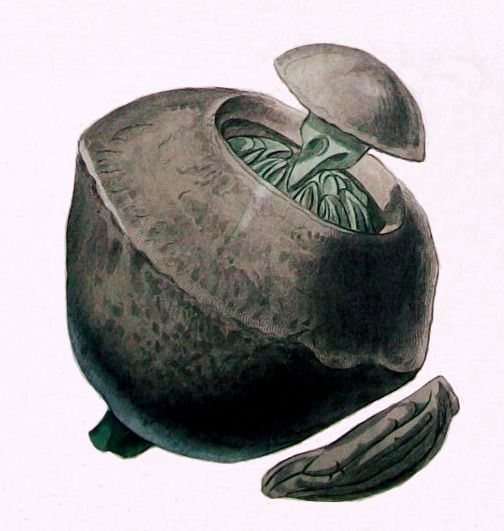
Fruit of Lecythis zabucajo

== Monkey pot ==
Monkey pot is a common name for many tropical trees in the genus Lecythis and the fruits produced by these trees, particularly Lecythis ollaria of Brazil and Lecythis zabucajo of northeastern South America. The name is said to derive from an old proverb, "a wise old monkey doesn't stick its hand into a pot", referring to the pot-like fruit that hold the seeds, and monkeys' eagerness to obtain the seeds. Supposedly, young monkeys would stick their paw into an almost ripe fruit and would be unable to get it back out for their paws were filled with nuts, while old monkeys would learn it was better to be patient and pull out the nuts one by one.

== History ==
Because the seeds are rich in oil the plant was brought to Singapore as an experimental economic plant. Jean-Baptiste Christophore Fusée Aublet (1720-1778), discovered the Lecythis zabucajo during his two-year sojourn in French Guiana, where he held the office of Apothecary Botanist. He gathered material for his book, Histoire des Plantes de la Guyane Françoise (The Plant History of French Guiana), which was published in 1775.
