= Lecythis retusa =

Conservation status
- Near Threatened (IUCN 2.3)

Scientific classification
- Kingdom: Plantae
- Clade: Tracheophytes
- Clade: Angiosperms
- Clade: Eudicots
- Clade: Asterids
- Order: Ericales
- Family: Lecythidaceae
- Genus: Lecythis
- Species: L. retusa

Binomial name
- Lecythis retusa Spruce ex Berg

Species of flowering plant

Lecythis retusa is a species of woody plant in the family Lecythidaceae. It is found only in Brazil. It is threatened by habitat loss.
