= Lecythis lanceolata =

Conservation status
- Conservation Dependent (IUCN 2.3)

Scientific classification
- Kingdom: Plantae
- Clade: Tracheophytes
- Clade: Angiosperms
- Clade: Eudicots
- Clade: Asterids
- Order: Ericales
- Family: Lecythidaceae
- Genus: Lecythis
- Species: L. lanceolata

Binomial name
- Lecythis lanceolata Poir.

Species of flowering plant

Lecythis lanceolata is a species of woody plant in the family Lecythidaceae of the order Ericales. It is endemic to the Atlantic Forest ecoregion in southeast Brazil, where is known as sapucaia-mirim. It was described by Jean Louis Marie Poiret in 1804.
