= Lecythis schomburgkii =

Conservation status
- Vulnerable (IUCN 2.3)

Scientific classification
- Kingdom: Plantae
- Clade: Tracheophytes
- Clade: Angiosperms
- Clade: Eudicots
- Clade: Asterids
- Order: Ericales
- Family: Lecythidaceae
- Genus: Lecythis
- Species: L. schomburgkii

Binomial name
- Lecythis schomburgkii Berg

Species of flowering plant

Lecythis schomburgkii is a species of woody plant in the family Lecythidaceae. It is found in Brazil and Guyana. It is threatened by habitat loss.
