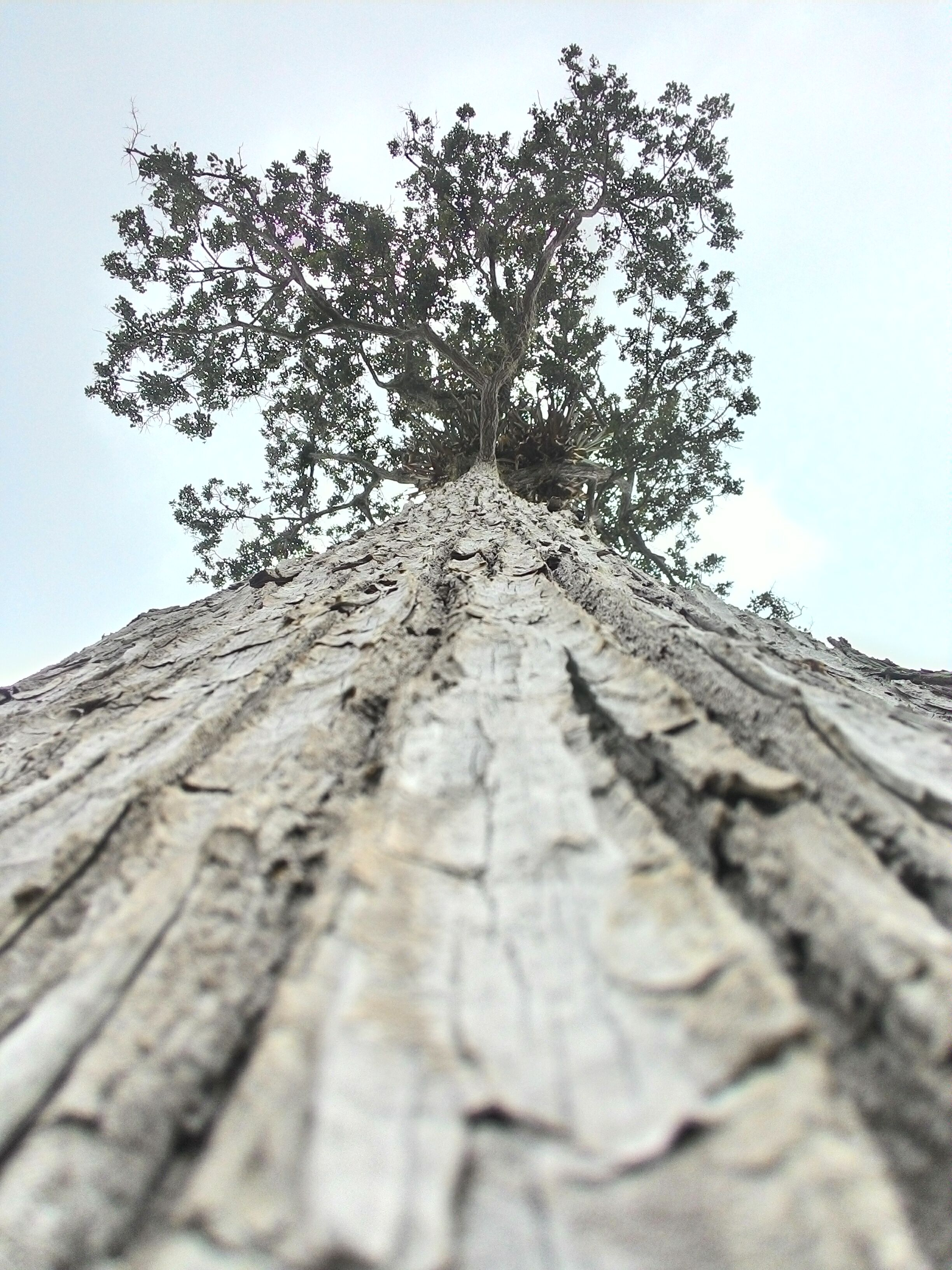

Conservation status
- Conservation Dependent (IUCN 2.3)

Scientific classification
- Kingdom: Plantae
- Clade: Tracheophytes
- Clade: Angiosperms
- Clade: Eudicots
- Clade: Asterids
- Order: Ericales
- Family: Lecythidaceae
- Genus: Lecythis
- Species: L. lurida

Binomial name
- Lecythis lurida (Miers) S.A.Mori

= Lecythis lurida =

Species of flowering plant

Lecythis lurida is a species of woody plant in the family Lecythidaceae of the order Ericales.

It is endemic to Brazil, where is known as castanha-jarana.

It is found in the states of Amazonas, Bahia, Espírito Santo, Pará, Pernambuco, Piauí, Rio de Janeiro, and Sergipe.

It is threatened by habitat loss.
