= Sapucaia, Rio de Janeiro =

Sapucaia
- Municipality
- Município de Sapucaia
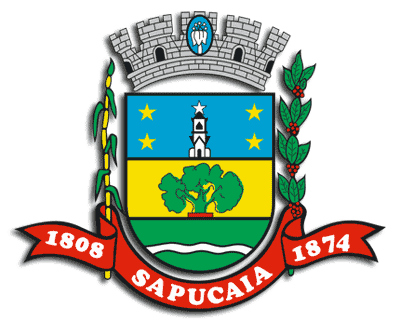
- Flag Coat of arms

- Location of Sapucaia in the state of Rio de Janeiro

- Location of Sapucaia in Brazil
- Coordinates: 21°59′42″S 42°54′50″W
- Country: Brazil
- Region: Southeast
- State: Rio de Janeiro

Government
  - Prefeito: Fabrício Baião (MDB)

Area
  - Total: 540.350 km^{2} (208.630 sq mi)
- Elevation: 221 m (725 ft)

Population (2020)
  - Total: 18,249
- Time zone: UTC−3 (BRT)

Sapucaia (Portuguese pronunciation: [sapuˈkajɐ]) is a municipality located in the Brazilian state of Rio de Janeiro. Its population was 18,249 (2020) and its area is 540 km^{2}. Sapucaia is also the local name for the tree Lecythis zabucajo.
