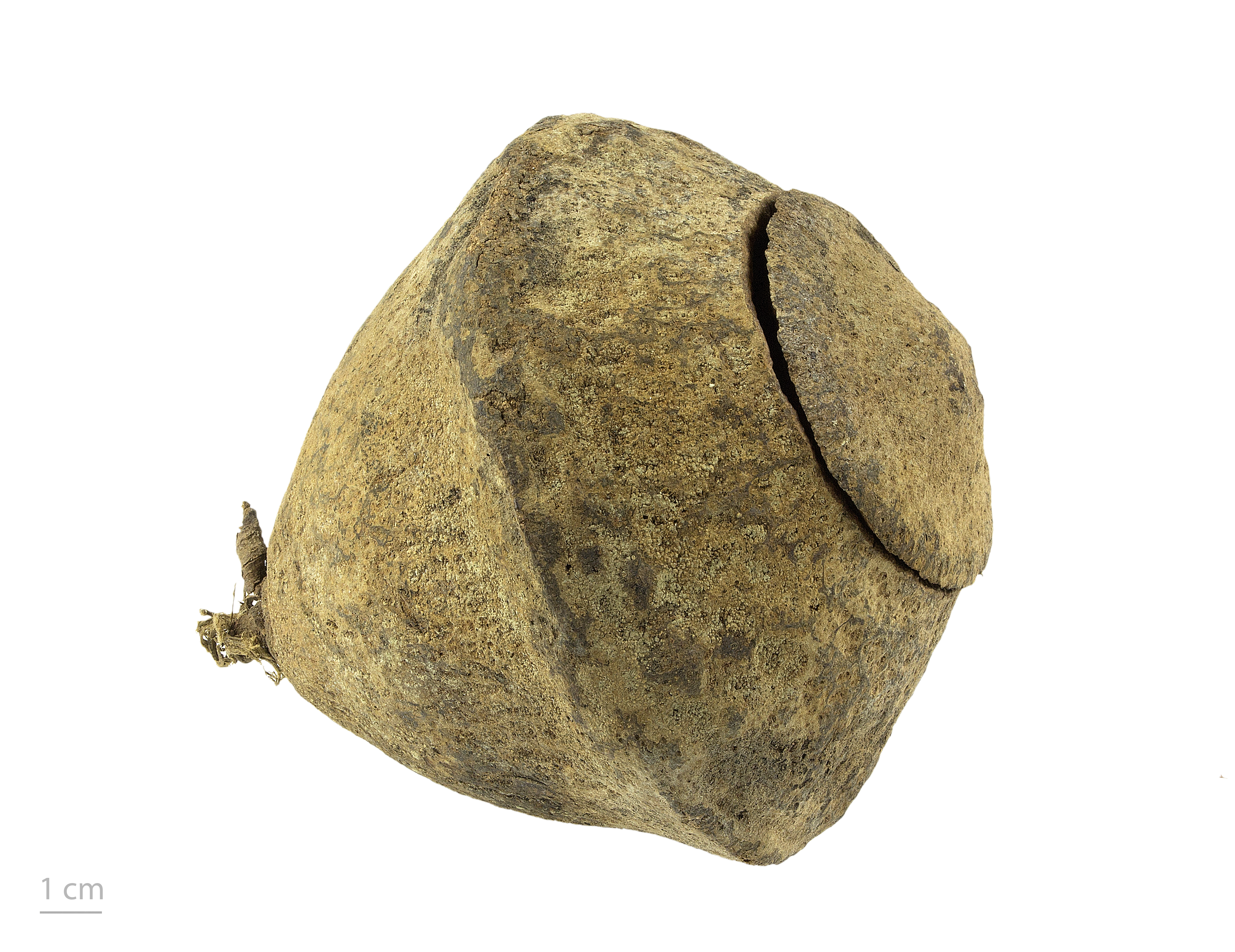
- Fruit with lid

Scientific classification
- Kingdom: Plantae
- Clade: Tracheophytes
- Clade: Angiosperms
- Clade: Eudicots
- Clade: Asterids
- Order: Ericales
- Family: Lecythidaceae
- Genus: Lecythis
- Species: L. zabucajo

Binomial name
- Lecythis zabucajo Aubl.

Synonyms
- Lecythis crassinoda Miers; Lecythis davisii Sandwith; Lecythis davisii var. gracilipes Eyma; Lecythis hians A.C.Sm. Lecythis lecomtei Pamp. Lecythis tumefacta Miers; Lecythis validissima Miers

= Lecythis zabucajo =

Species of flowering plant

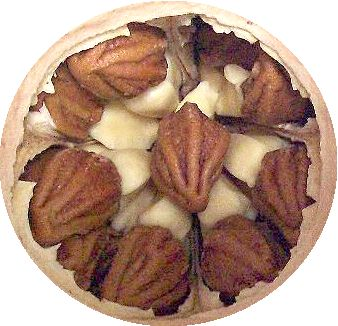
Lid removed and showing nuts with cream-coloured arils

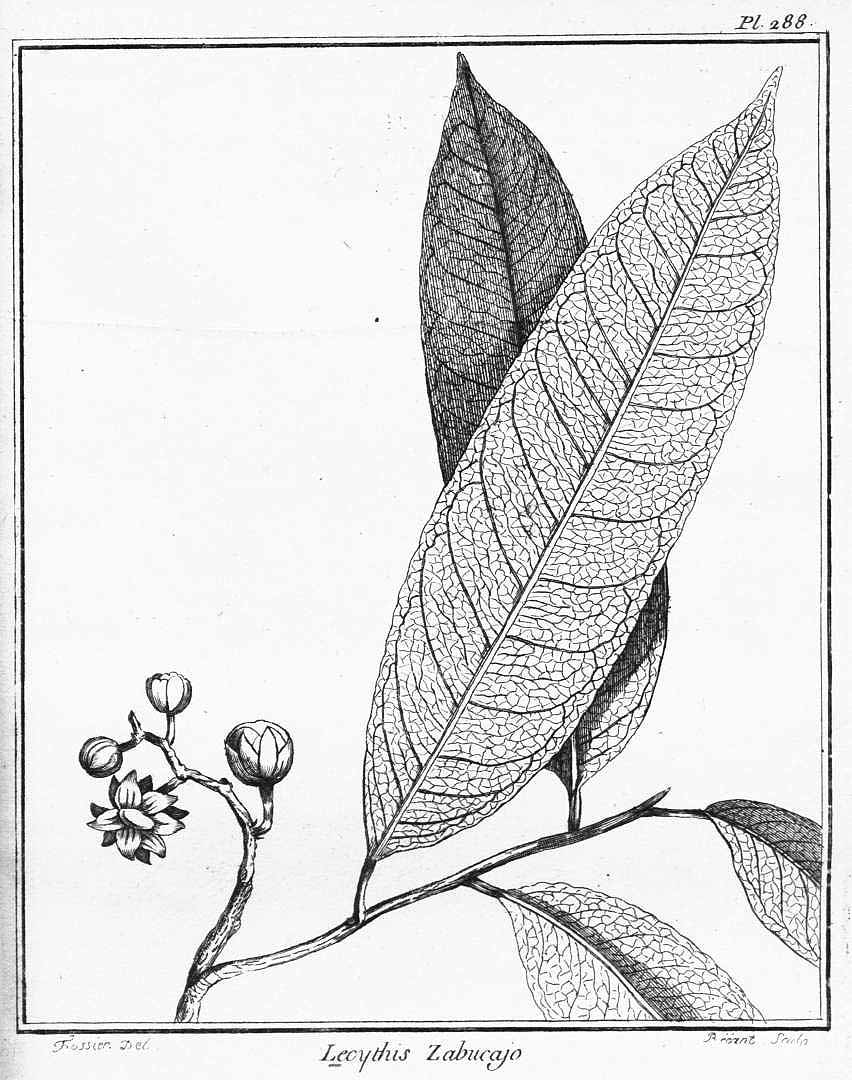
Leaves and flowers

Lecythis zabucajo, the sapucaia or paradise nut, is a large nut-producing tree occurring in the Guianas, Suriname, Venezuela, Ecuador, Honduras and Brazil, and which distribution range is much the same as that of the greater spear-nosed bat (Phyllostomus hastatus). Although not singling out Lecythis zabucajo, Jacques Huber noted in 1909 that fruit bats played the most important role in seed dispersal in Amazonian forests. The quality of its nuts led to the species' being introduced to numerous tropical countries, notably Trinidad, where it has flourished. The nuts are a valuable food resource and yield oil suitable for cooking and domestic use.

This species is closely related to the Brazil nut, both belonging to the family Lecythidaceae and having coconut-sized fruits. The tree's large woody gourd-like fruits with edible white flesh are used for water vessels and for ornamental purposes. The fruit is called 'monkey pot', a name used for a number of other species, including Lecythis elliptica, Lecythis grandiflora, and Lecythis pisonis. The name is said to derive from baiting an empty fruit with food and fixing it to a low branch; a monkey can easily insert its paw through the opening, but cannot withdraw it once it has grasped the contents.

The unusual shape and size of the pendant woody capsule, with its lid or operculum, is shared by other Lecythidaceae genera such as Couroupita, Bertholletia and Grias. The family is ecologically important in the Amazon rainforest, and a 2006 survey sampling 277,069 trees, found it to be the third most abundant family, while Eschweilera is represented by more trees than any other genus. The nuts and arils are highly nutritious so that on maturing they are soon removed by animals. Bats, particularly Phyllostomus hastatus, play an important role in dispersal of the species as they eat the aril and have to remove the nut from the capsule in order to do so. The genus Lecythis is thought to concentrate the trace element Selenium in its seeds, which, while an essential part of a balanced diet in small quantities, selenoproteins being important antioxidant enzymes, may lead to poisoning if taken excessively.

== History ==
Jean Baptiste Christophore Fusée Aublet (1720–1778) first described Lecythis zabucajo as a result of his two-year stay in French Guiana between 1762 and 1764, when he held the office of Apothecary Botanist. During this period he gathered material for his book Histoire des Plantes de la Guyane Françoise which was published in 1775. Aublet's ill-health cut short his stay in Guiana, and after a brief stay in Haiti he returned to Paris in 1765.

== Description ==
'Lecythis' is derived from the Greek 'lekythos', a narrow-necked oil flask, while 'zabucajo' is a rendition of 'sapucaia', one of the local names for this tree and also used for Lecythis pisonis.

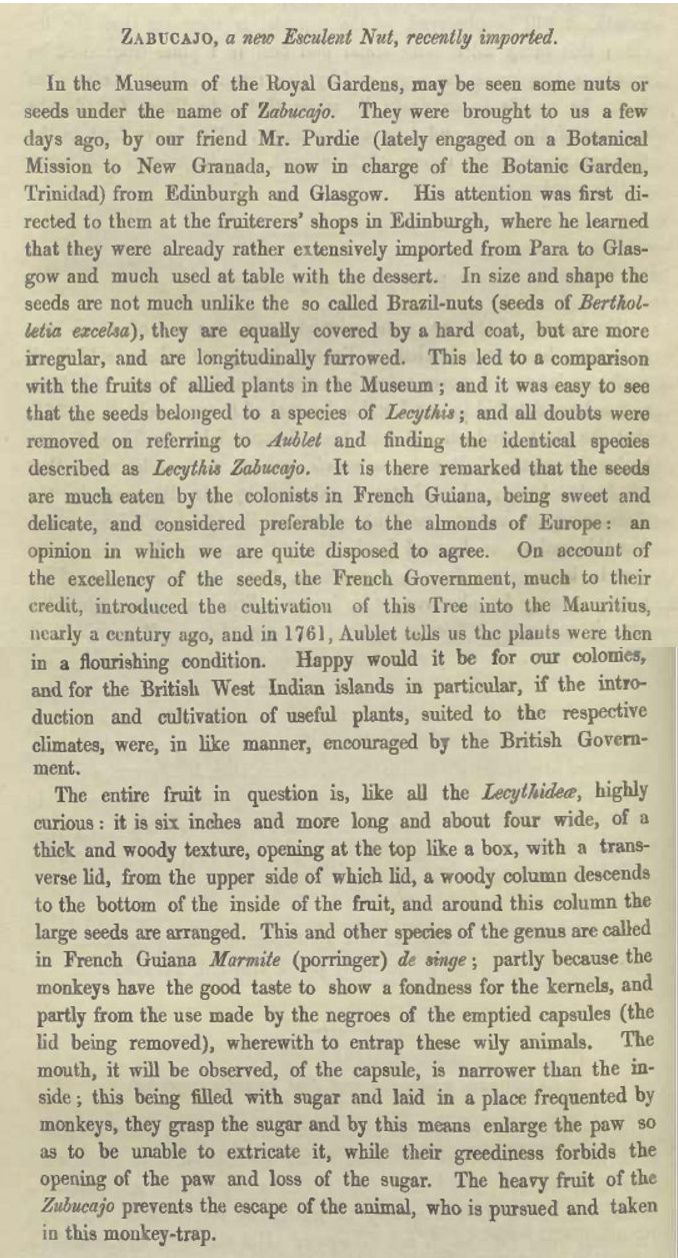
Excerpt from Hooker's Journal of Botany Miscellany (1849)

This species is common in the Guianas and eastern Venezuela, but less frequently found in central and western Amazonia. It is a large canopy or emergent tree of non-inundated forests, growing to 55 m tall. When young its twigs are glabrous and markedly lenticellate, or puberulous. Mature bark is brown to grayish brown, and deeply fissured vertically. The sapwood is creamish to yellowish white, while the heartwood is usually reddish brown.

The leaves are dropped shortly before the flowers have fully opened – (anthesis); petioles are 3–10 mm long, and puberulous or glabrous; the leaf blades are narrowly to widely elliptic, 6–11.5 × 2–5.5 cm, glabrous, chartaceous, the base obtuse, very narrowly decurrent onto petiole, the margins crenate, the apex acuminate; secondary veins occur in 10–16 pairs.

Flowering is from June to September. One or two racemes grow from the same point or there is a paniculate arrangement of racemes, normally from young twigs below the leaves or sometimes terminal, bearing 5–30 flowers, the rachis 4–10.5 cm long, sometimes with conspicuous lenticels; the glabrous or puberulous pedicels are 3–5 mm long, subtended by a caducous bract, with two ovate caducous bracteoles 2–2.5 × 2 mm arising from near the base. Flowers are 4–5 cm in diameter; calyx with 6 ovate, green lobes, 5–10 × 5–9 mm; there are 6 petals, widely obovate, 15–25 × 15–19 mm, yellow or occasionally white, frequently purple at edges and apex; the staminal ring has 370–510 stamens, with filaments 1.5–2 mm long, wider at apex, yellow, with anthers 0.5 mm long; hood flat, 10–20 × 16–20 mm, yellow, sometimes white, with well-developed appendages, proximal with anthers, distal antherless, the pollen of hood turning black with age; hypanthium usually puberulous, sometimes glabrous; ovary 4-locular, with 12–26 ovules in each locule, the ovules inserted on lower part of septum, the style 1.5–2 mm long, with annular expansion towards the tip.

Fallen androecia from the Lecythidaceae harbour a rich population of insects. A study found over 1300 insects representing 21 families, including abundant Diptera and Coleoptera, five moth morphospecies and four species of lycaenid butterflies, from a sample of stamen litter. Predators and parasitoids were also found, showing an additional trophic level.

Fruits are globose or turbinate, always slightly wider than long, 6–12(16.5) (excluding operculum) × 7.5–13(17.5) cm, the calycine ring usually more or less prominent, the pericarp 10–18 (25) mm thick, the operculum convex. Seeds fusiform, 2–4 × 1–1.5 cm, with 4–6 grooves or sulci, the seed coat rugulose; aril fleshy and cream-coloured with a sweet licorice or aniseed flavour, and supposedly having psychoactive properties.

The 2S proteins from Lecythis zabucajo are rich in sulphur amino acids, especially methionine.
