= Las Delicias Zoo =

Las Delicias Zoo Parque Zoológico Las Delicias
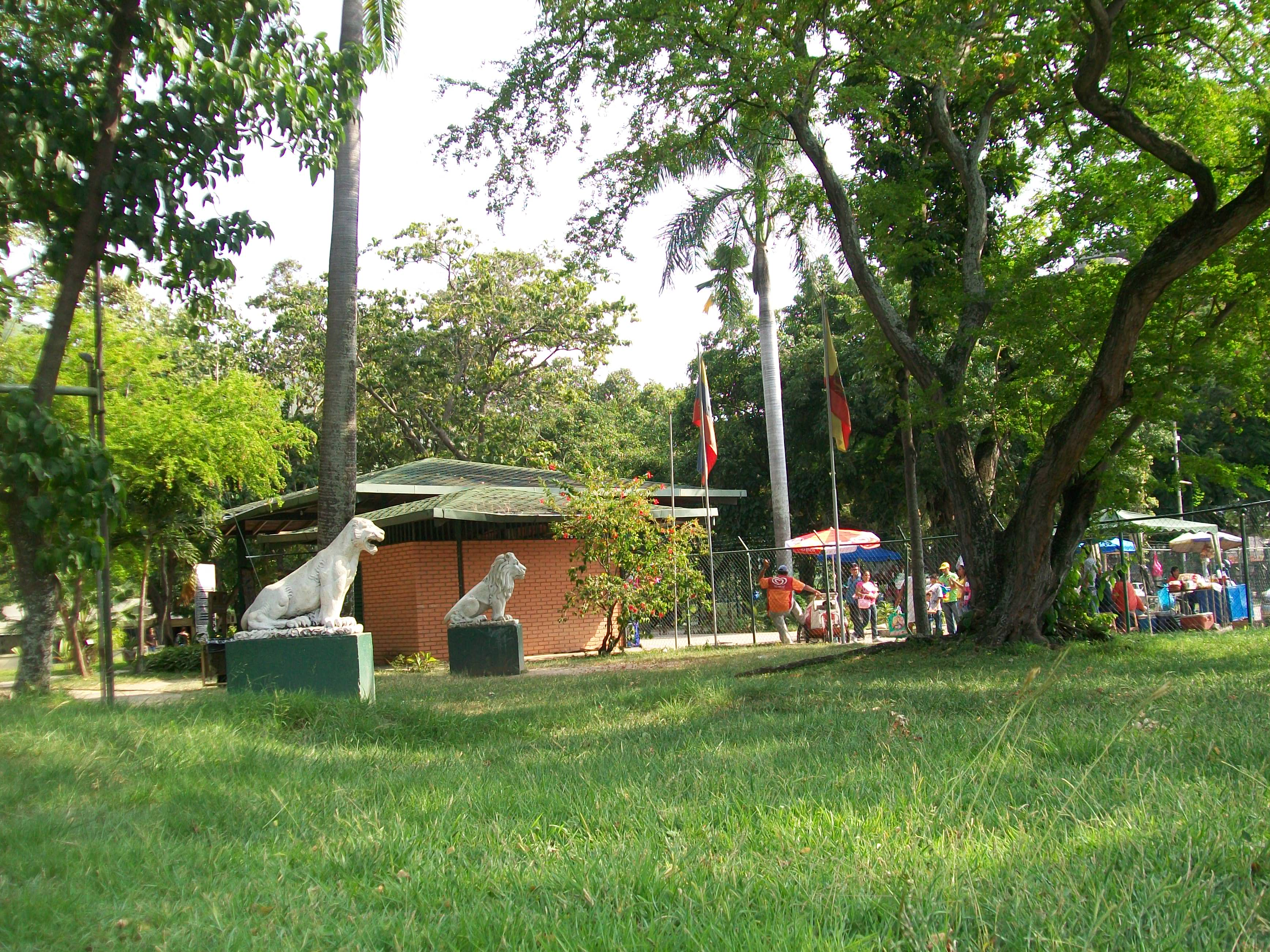
- Interactive map of Las Delicias Zoo; Parque Zoológico Las Delicias
- 10°17′13″N 67°33′48″W
- Date opened: 1952
- Location: Maracay, Venezuela

The Las Delicias Zoo (Spanish: Parque Zoológico de Las Delicias) Also Zoological Park of Las Delicias Is an urban zoological garden located at 400 meters above sea level in the northern end of the city of Maracay, Aragua State in Venezuela with native species from the Cordillera region and the rest of Venezuela. The zoo operates under Declaration No. 655 published in Official Gazette No. 32007 of June 17, 1980.

The Ministry of the Environment maintains the rectory of the Maracay Zoo and the Aragua State Government assumes some administrative responsibility to support the programs that are developed in the park. The zoo is a historical continuation of a hacienda in the eastern slope of Cola de Caballo Mountains.

The zoo of Maracay opened for the first time in 1915 at the initiative of General Juan Vicente Gómez as a corral with a personal exhibition of many animals presented at Las Delicias hacienda, owned by the president. Then, native animals such as chigüires, nutrias, corocoras, gabanes, garzones soldiers and alligators.

In 1928 the collection was enriched with specimens requested from the Hamburg Zoo and other places such as Bengal, Elephant, Giraffe, Orangutan, Chimpanzee and African Lions. Gómez died in his house inside the zoo grounds in December 1935. The zoo was officially inaugurated in 1952 by the then president of Venezuela Marcos Pérez Jiménez. It was also known for their hybrid bears, which derived from a mating between a male spectacled bear and a female Asian black bear.

== Gallery ==
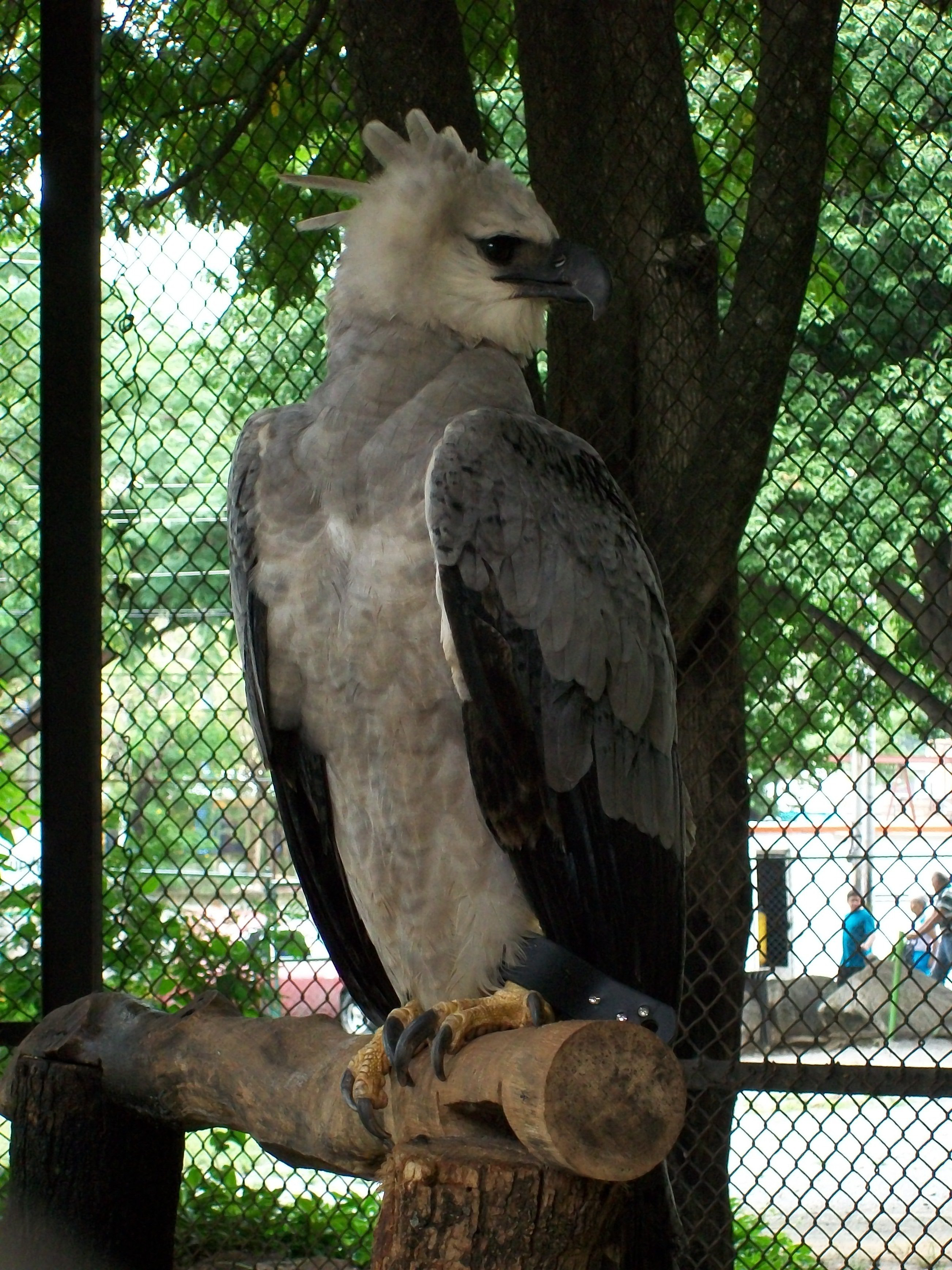

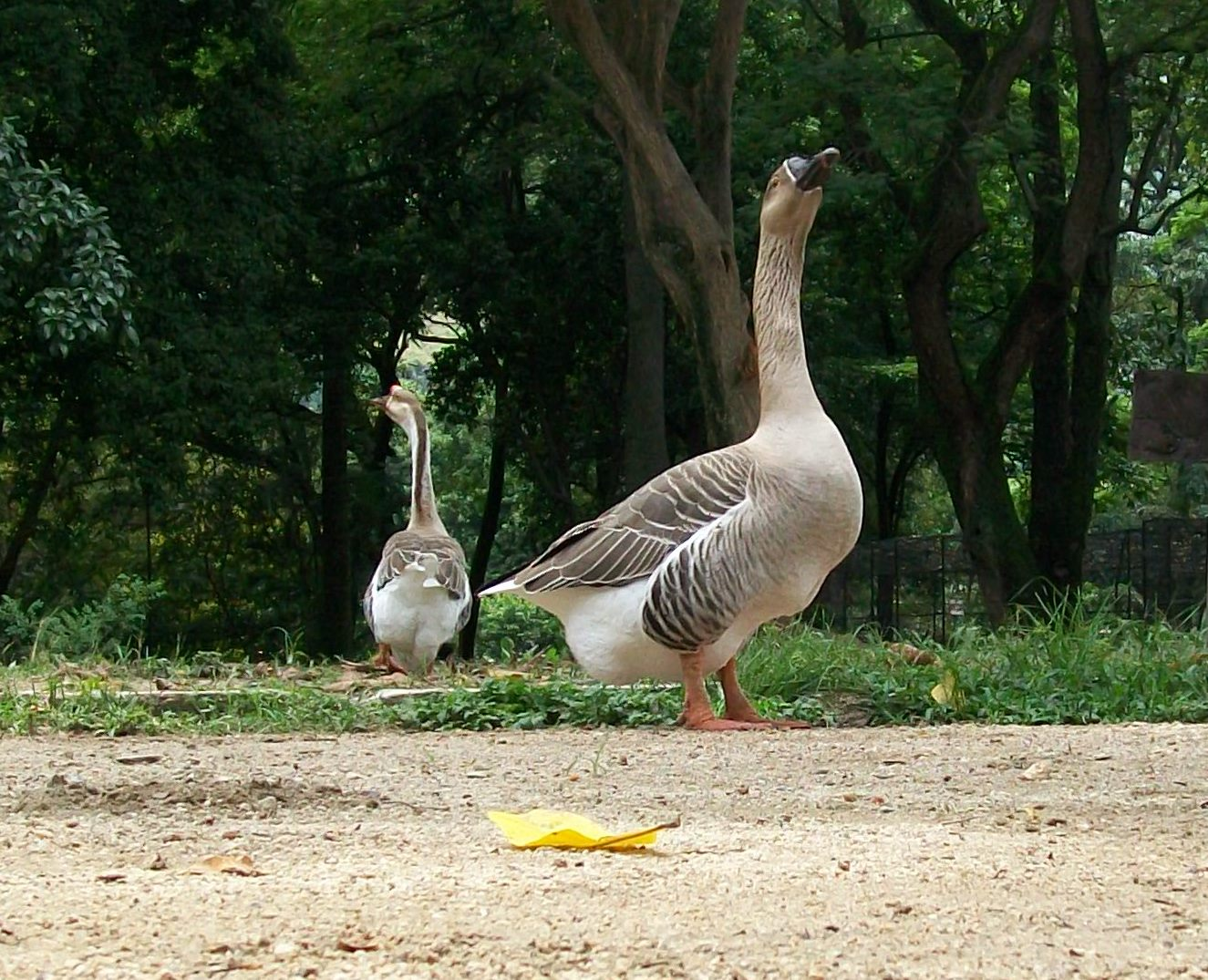

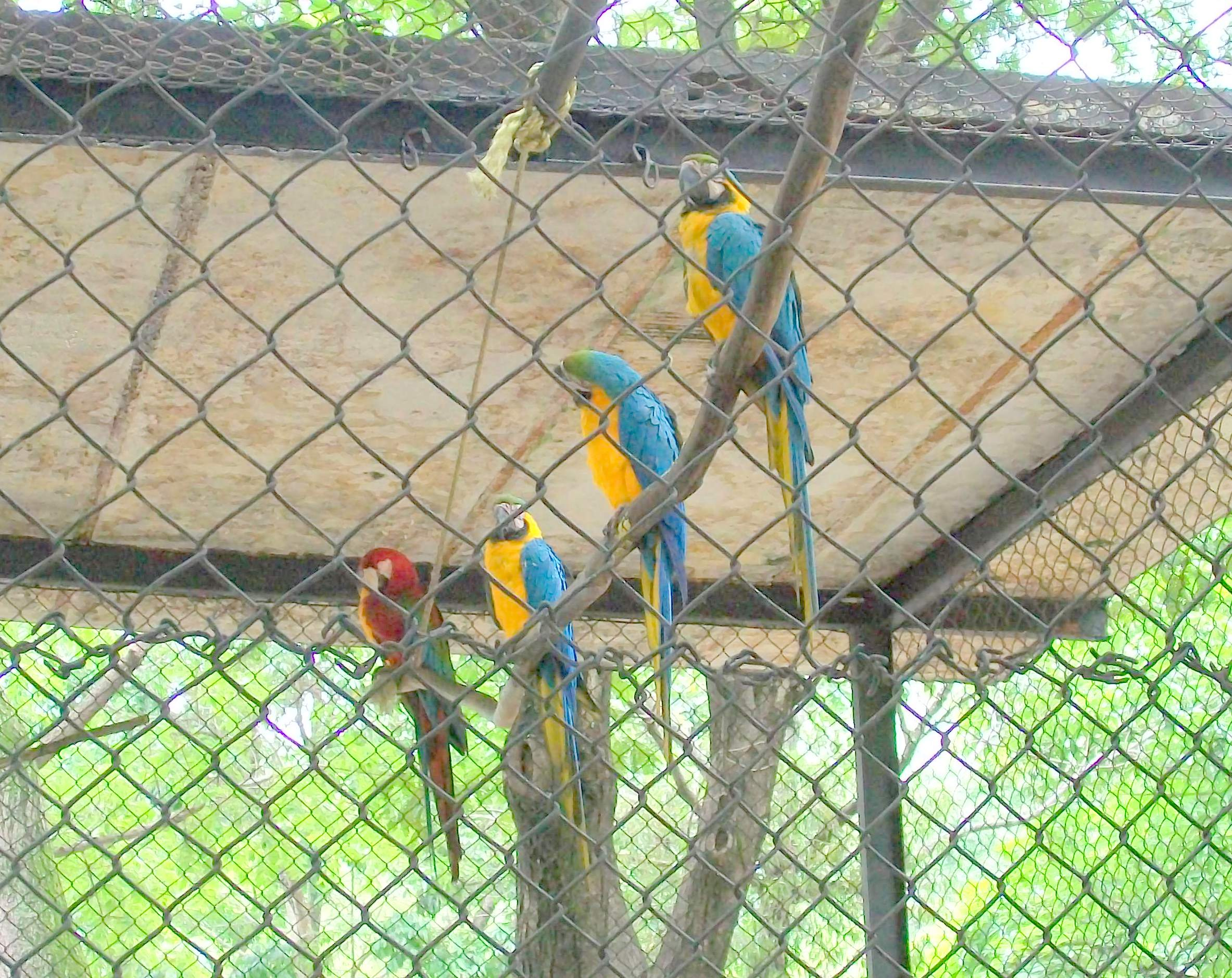

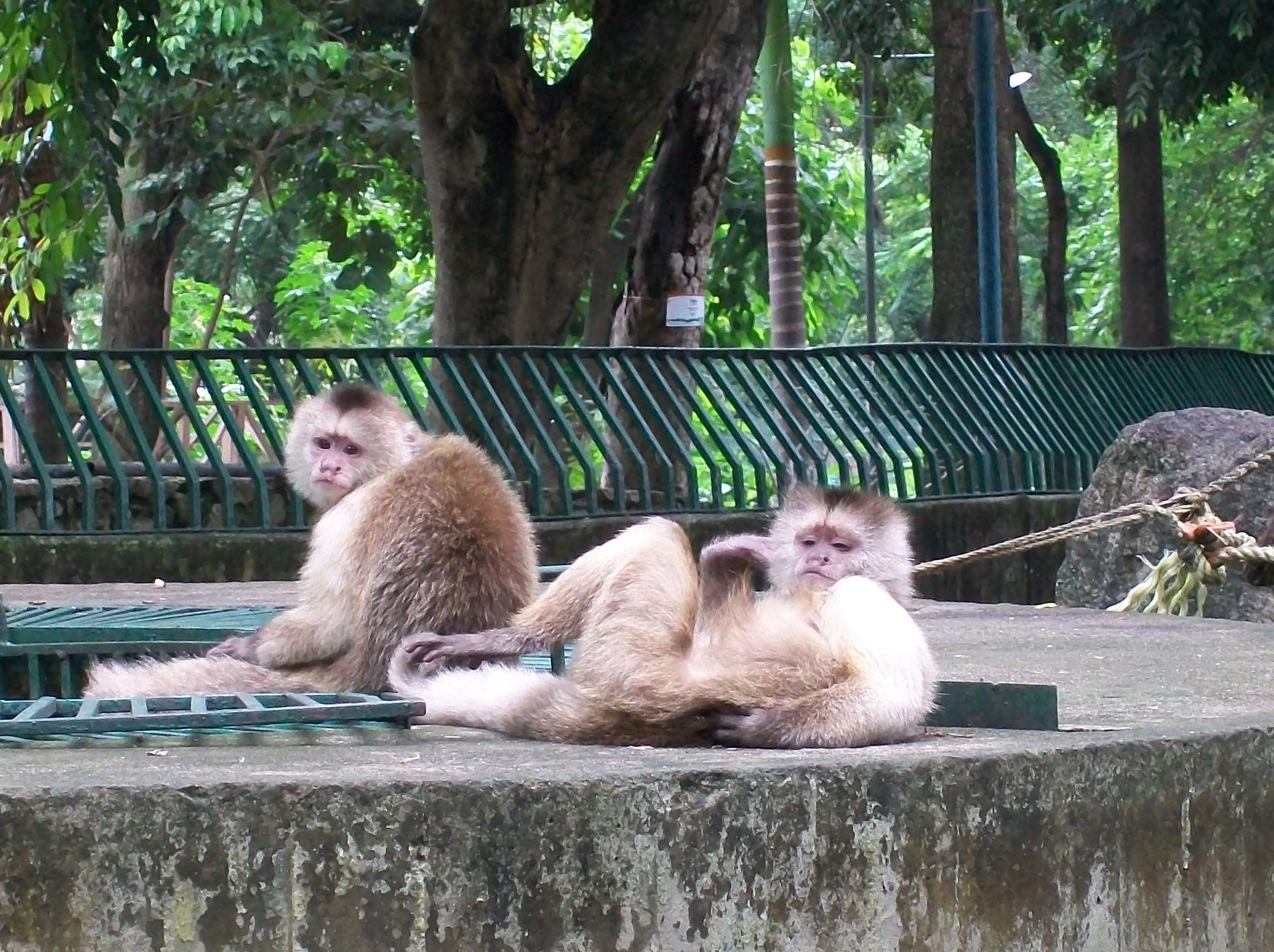

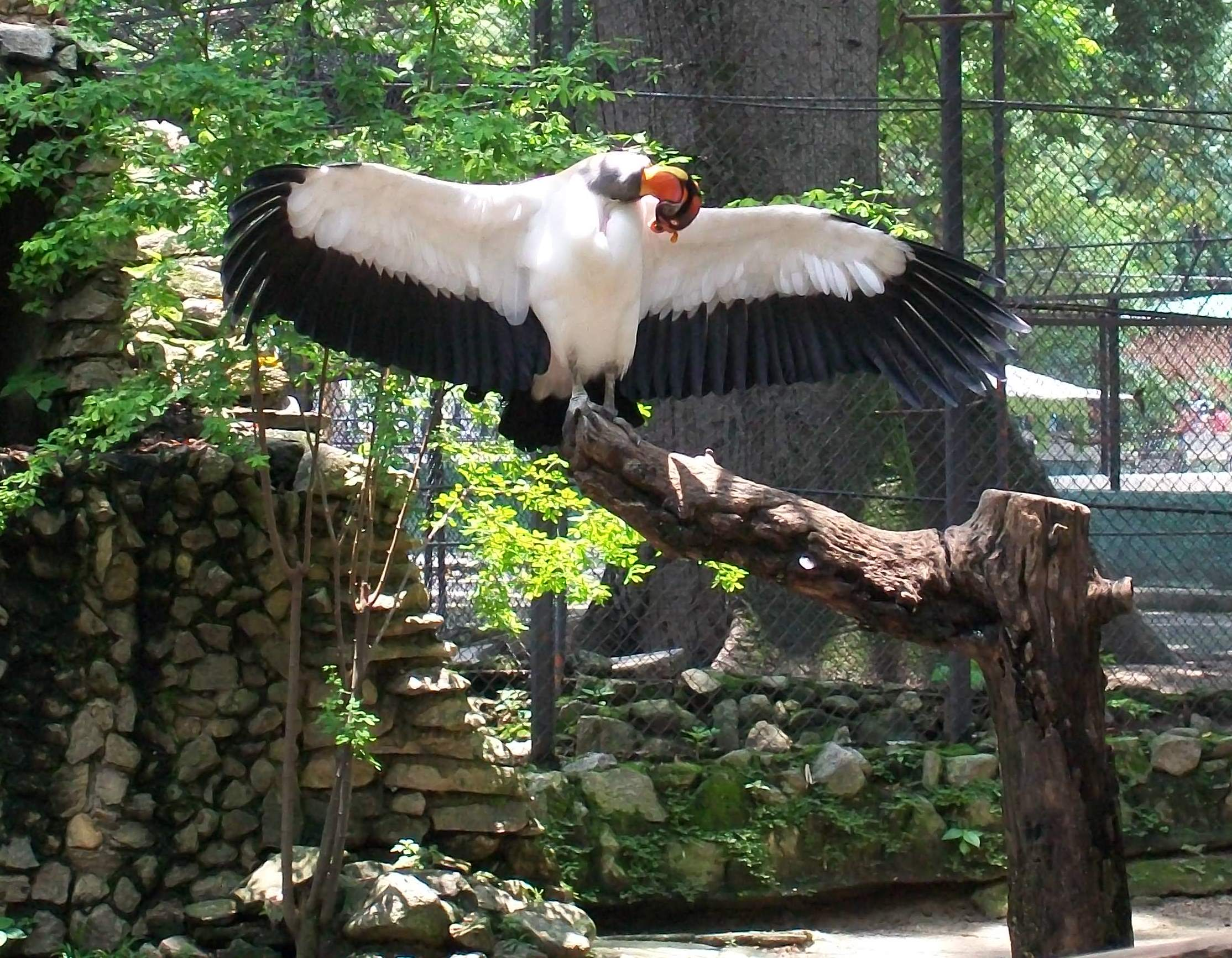

== See also ==
- List of national parks of Venezuela
- La Guaricha Zoo
