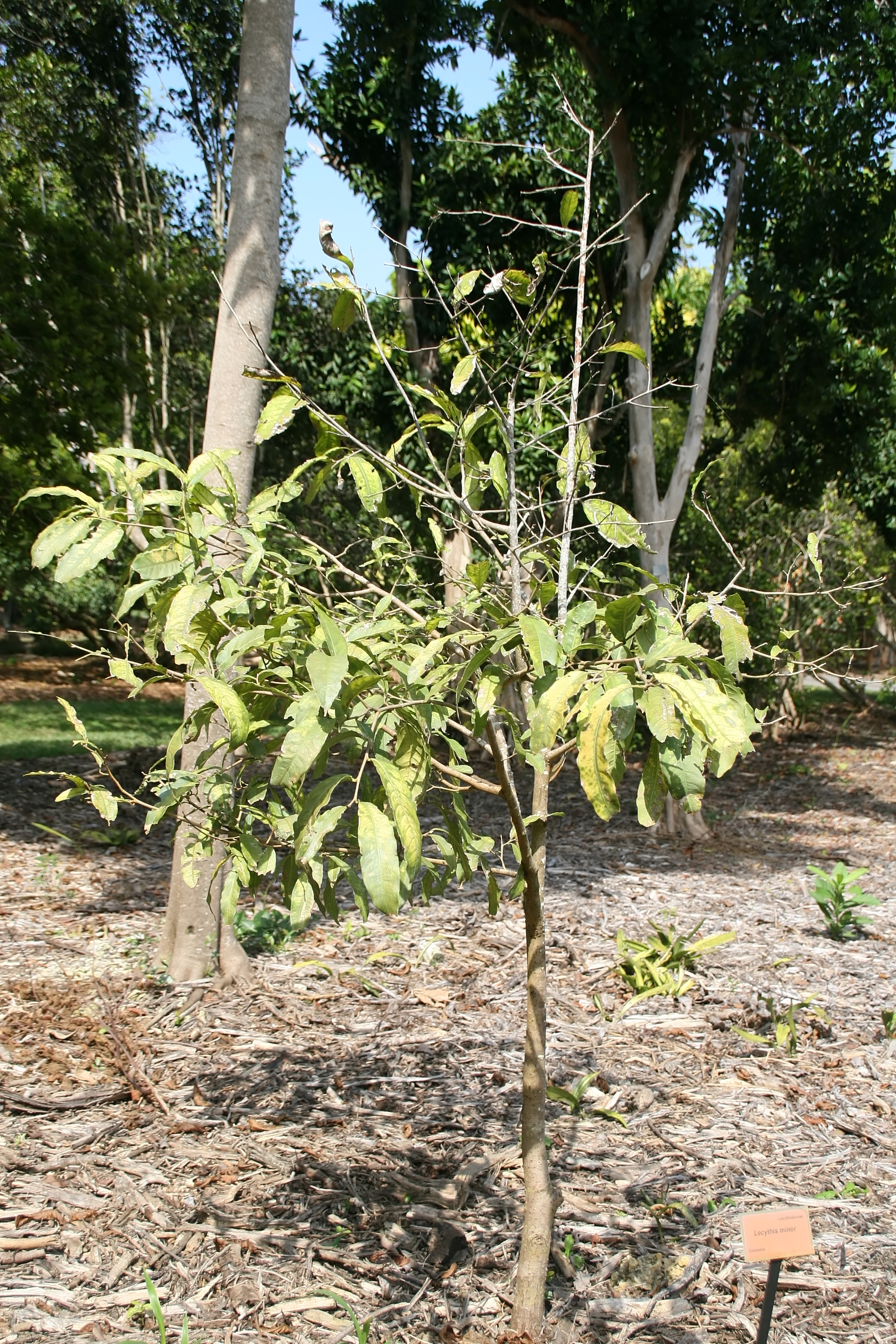

Conservation status
- Least Concern (IUCN 3.1)

Scientific classification
- Kingdom: Plantae
- Clade: Tracheophytes
- Clade: Angiosperms
- Clade: Eudicots
- Clade: Asterids
- Order: Ericales
- Family: Lecythidaceae
- Genus: Lecythis
- Species: L. minor

Binomial name
- Lecythis minor Jacq.

Synonyms
- Lecythis elliptica H. B. K.; Chytroma bipartita Pittier; Chytroma valida Miers; Eschweilera bolivarensis R. Knuth; Eschweilera valida (Miers) Neid.; Lecythis bipartita Pittier; Lecythis magdalenica Dugand; Lecythis purdiei R. Knuth

= Lecythis minor =

Species of plant

Lecythis minor, the monkey-pot tree, is a small tree with toxic seeds that occurs in South America.

== Description ==
Lecythis minor is a small to medium-sized tree that ranges from 5–25 m (16–82 ft) in height and has a 70 cm (28 in) diameter at breast height. Its bark is grey, and is smooth when the tree is young but develops deep vertical fissures as the tree ages.

It has ovoid leaves that are about 8.5–24.5 cm (3.3–9.6 in) long and 4.5–10 m (15–33 ft) wide. The leaves are glabrous and coriaceous, with serrated margins. The leaves have 12 to 19 pairs of lateral veins, and the leaf stalks are 5–20 mm (0.20–0.79 in) and puberulous.

The flowers of Lecythis minor are arranged on a rachis, being 10–35 cm (3.9–13.8 in) long, and the inflorescences are white to yellow, green while budding. Each rachis has 10 to 75 flowers, and the rachides are pubescent.

The fruit of the tree have a distinct cup shape representative of the genus Lecythis, and are spherical with a 7.5–11 mm (0.30–0.43 in) thick pericarp. The seeds are reddish-brown and fusiform, and contain toxic amounts of selenium. The seeds tolerate a very low pH.

== Habitat and ecology ==
Lecythis minor is common in South America. It ranges from the Maracaibo lowlands of Venezuela to the northern coast of Colombia where it ascends the Magdalena and Cauca valleys. It was introduced in many other places in South America as well, from La Lima in Honduras to Soledad in Cuba. It occurs in dry, open, and disturbed habitats, where it grows as a small and many-branched tree. It can also be found in moister forests where it forms a taller, single-trunked tree. It grows especially well along rivers in tropical forests. The tree tolerates an annual precipitation of 9.1–22.8 dm (36–90 in), an annual temperature of 24.4–26.5 °C (75.9–79.7 °F), and a soil pH of 5.0 to 8.0.

The tree is pollinated by bees and seeds are dispersed by fruit bats.

== Uses ==
It is cultivated as an ornamental tree in many places, such as the Summit Gardens in Panama. The nuts of the tree are collected when ripe, and the tree can produce fruit as young as 2 m (6 ft 7 in) tall. In indigenous medicine, the fruit is supposedly antiasthmatic and depilatory.

== Chemistry ==
The seeds are toxic, especially when consumed in large quantities. The toxicity is derived from the amino acid in the plant that is a selenium analog to cystathionine, through which selenium is stored in the seeds during reproductive growth. The seeds contain approximately 85% of the tree's total selenium in the form of selenomethionine. The seeds taste agreeable, but can induce nausea, anxiety, and giddiness, and can cause loss of hair and fingernails. Dickinson found that after consuming 300 to 600 seeds he had temporary loss of hair and fingernails. The toxicity can vary depending on the soil, as some evidence suggests that seed toxicity increases as the amount of selenium in the soil increases.
