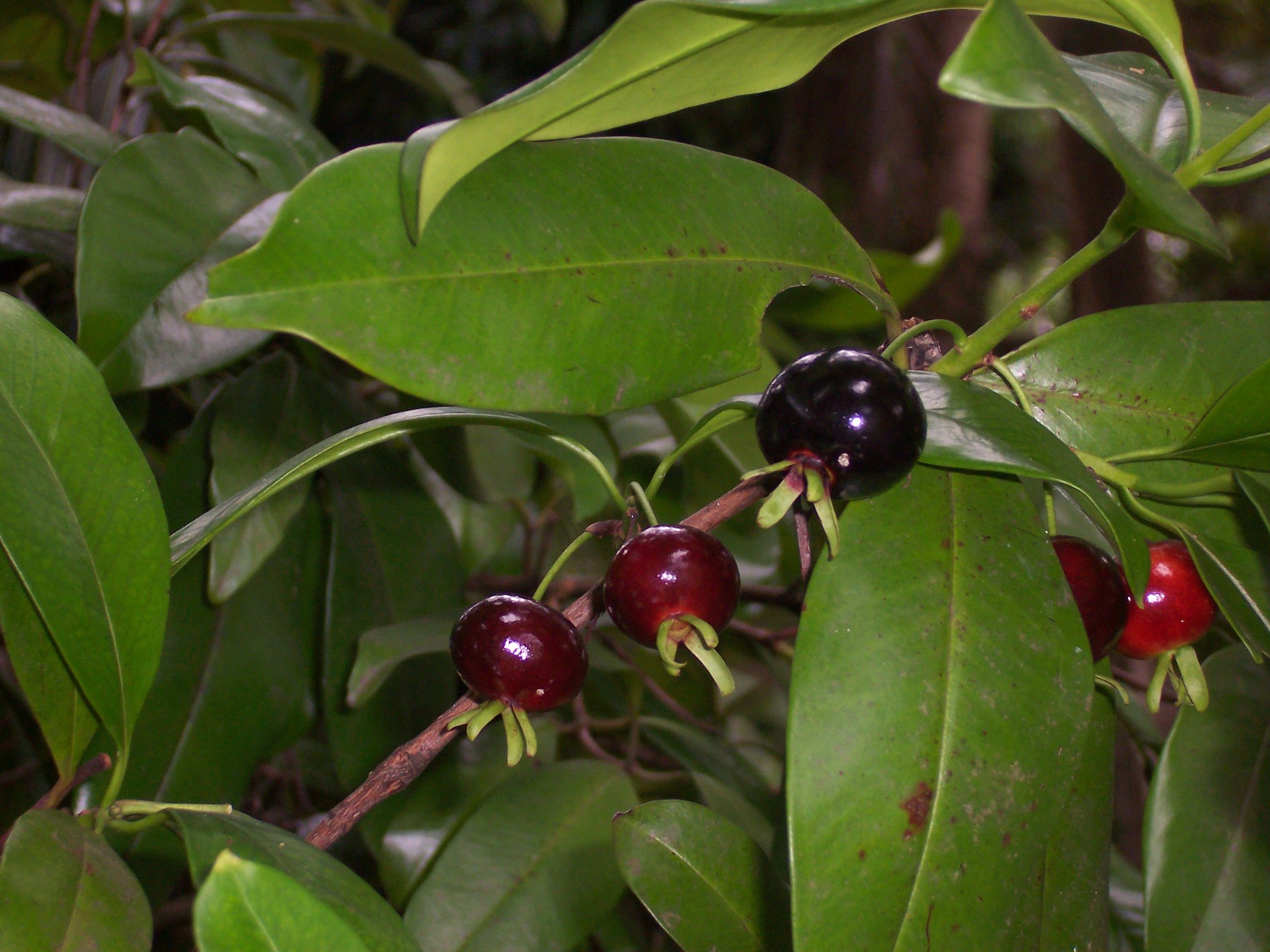
- Fruits of the grumichama (Eugenia brasiliensis)

Scientific classification
- Kingdom: Plantae
- Clade: Tracheophytes
- Clade: Angiosperms
- Clade: Eudicots
- Clade: Rosids
- Order: Myrtales
- Family: Myrtaceae
- Genus: Eugenia
- Species: E. brasiliensis

Binomial name
- Eugenia brasiliensis Lam.

Synonyms
- Eugenia bracteolaris Lam. ex DC.; Eugenia dombeyi Skeels nom. illeg.; Eugenia filipes Baill.; Eugenia filipes Baillon in Grandidier; Eugenia ubensis Cambess.; Myrtus dombeyi Spreng. nom. illeg.; Myrtus grumixama Vell.; Stenocalyx brasiliensis (Lam.) O.Berg; Stenocalyx ubensis (Cambess.) O.Berg

= Grumichama =

Species of tree

Eugenia brasiliensis, with common names Brazil cherry and grumichama, is a medium-sized tree (maximum 20 meters height) endemic (native) to southern Brazil which bears small fruits that are purple to black in color, and have a sweet cherry to plum-like flavor.

It's a small size tree which makes it perfect to use in urban landscaping. Its slow growth and low rate of dispersal make it rare, and it is generally considered as an endangered species.

The inner flesh of the fruit is white yellowish in appearance, it's mostly used for fresh eating but can also be used in making jams, jellies and pies.

== Gallery ==
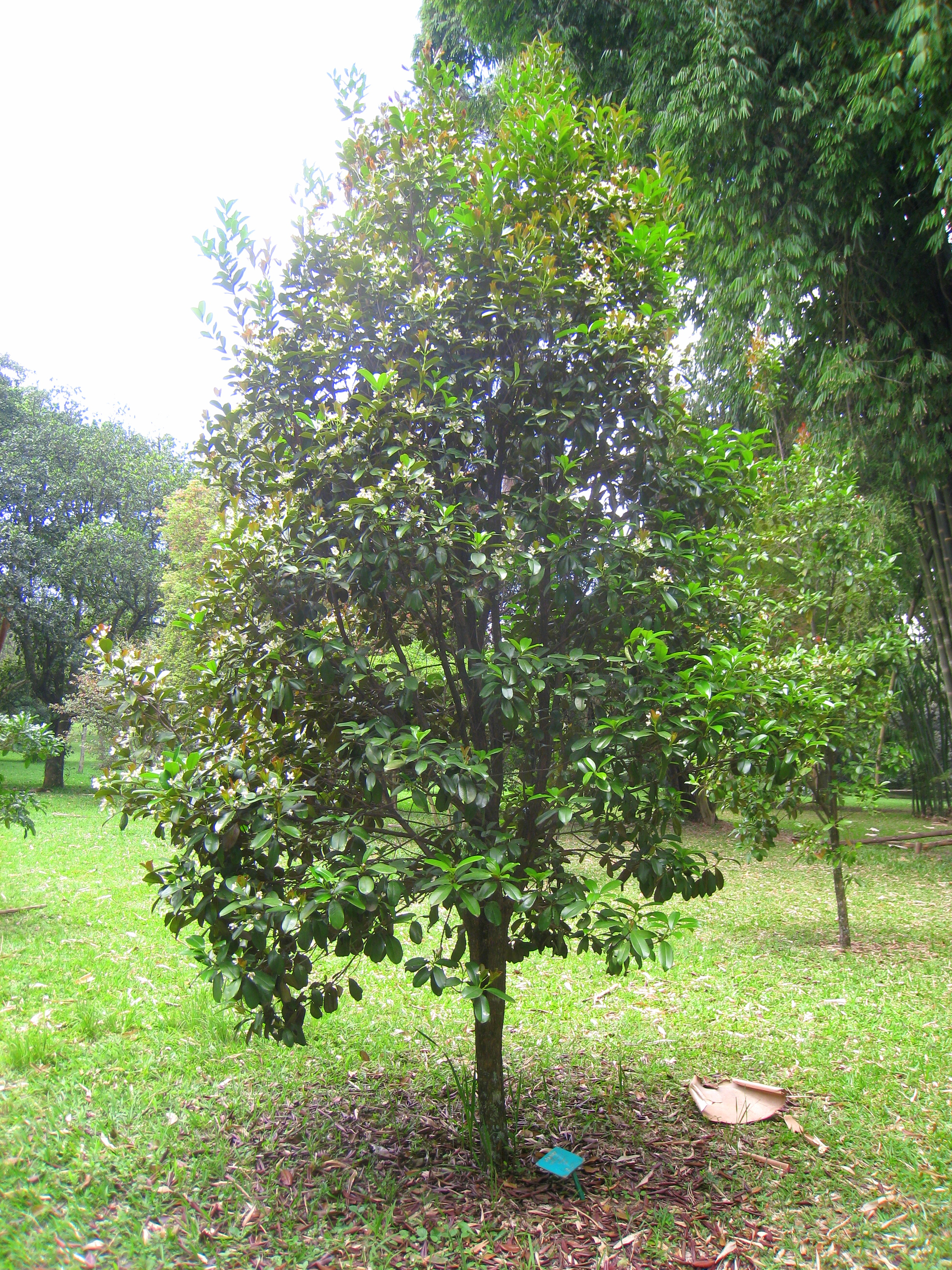

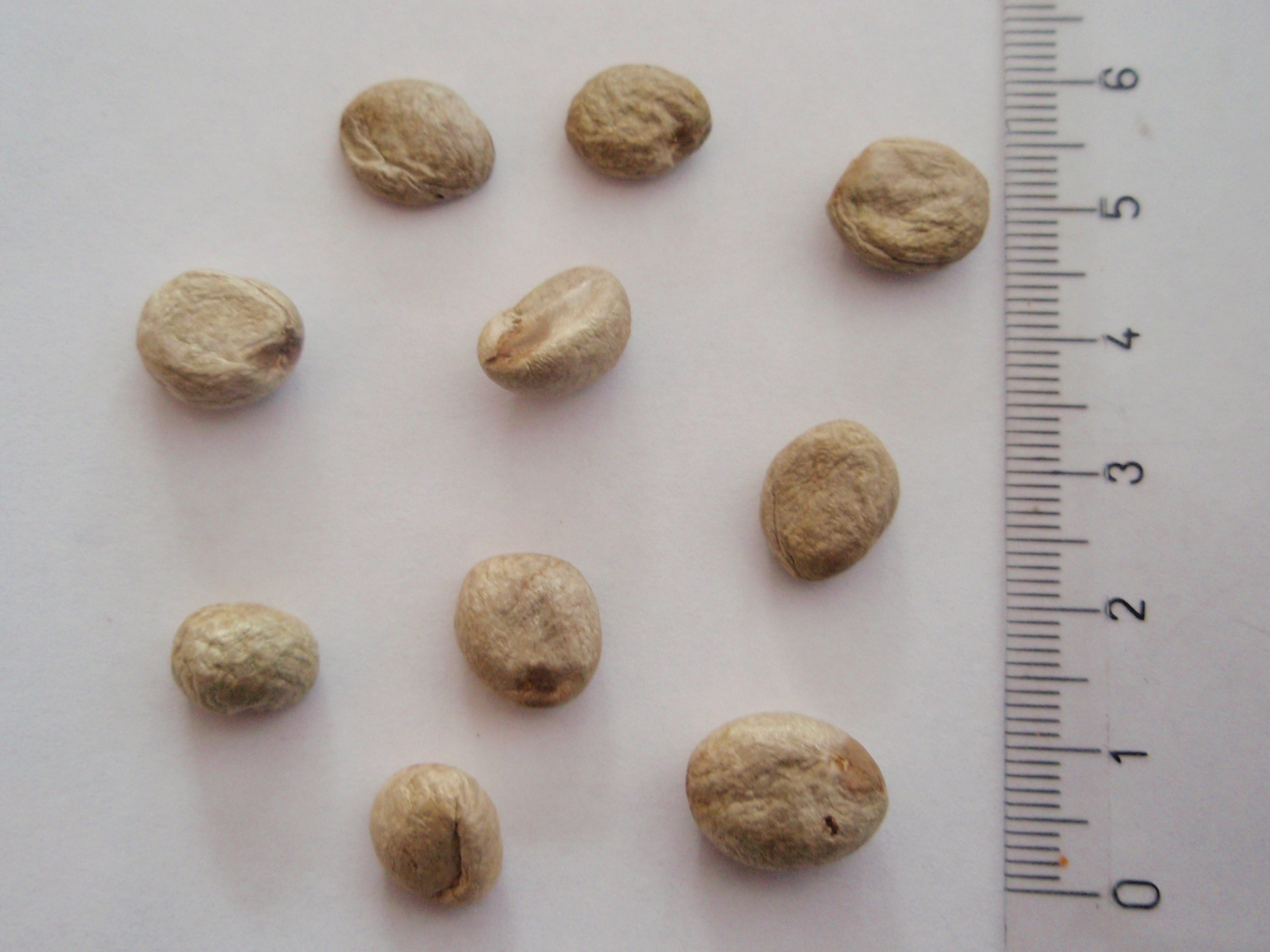

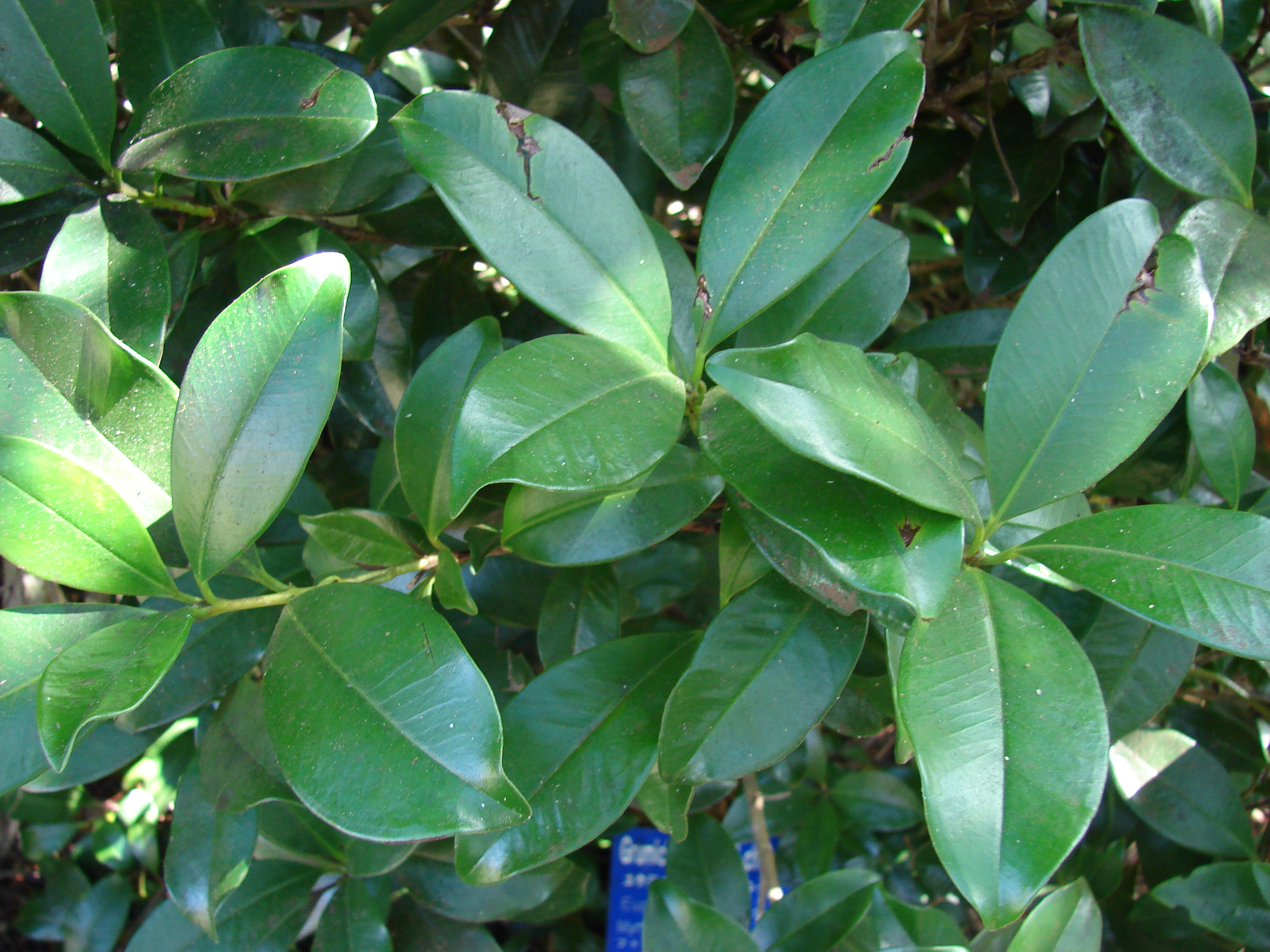

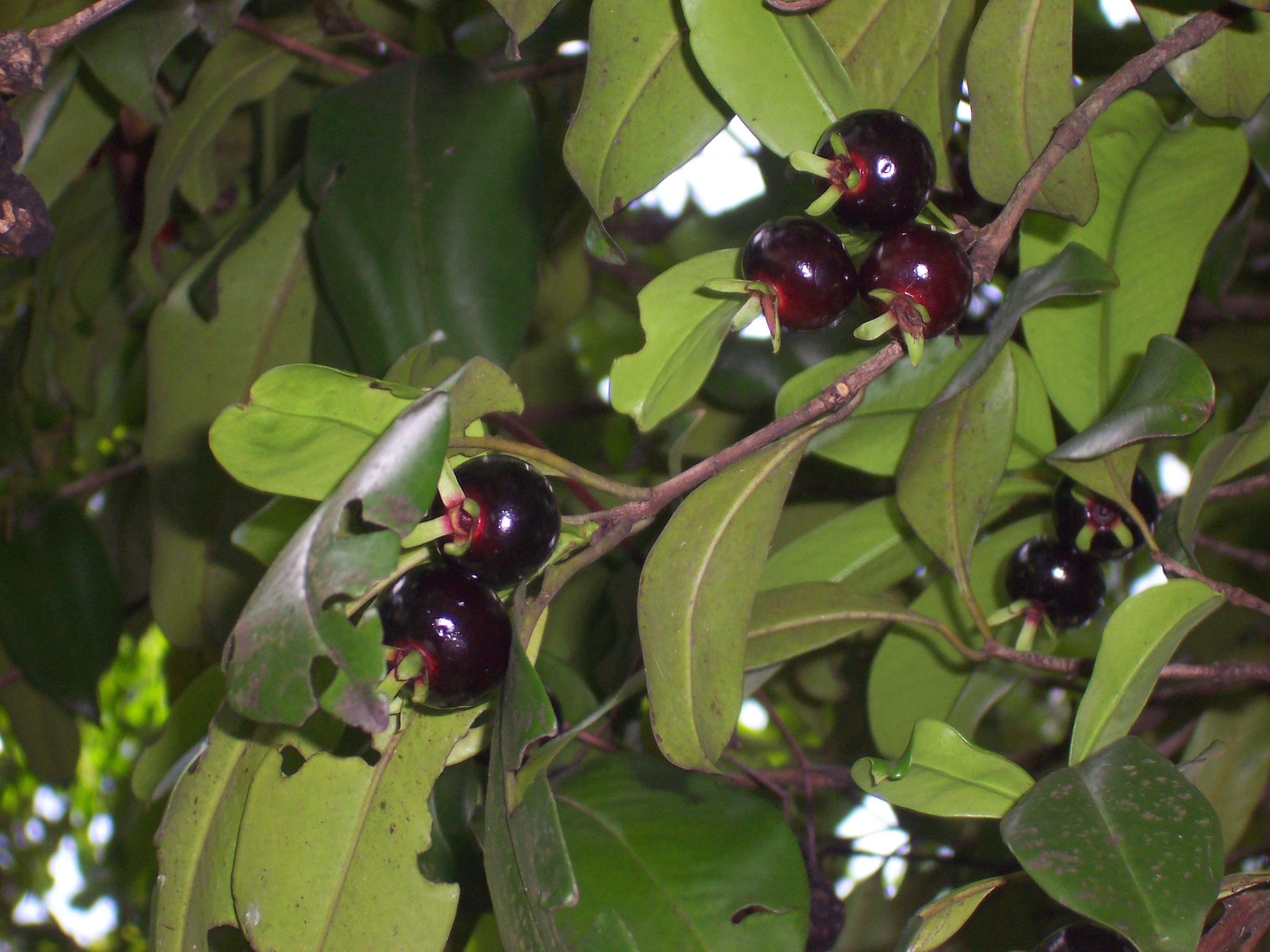

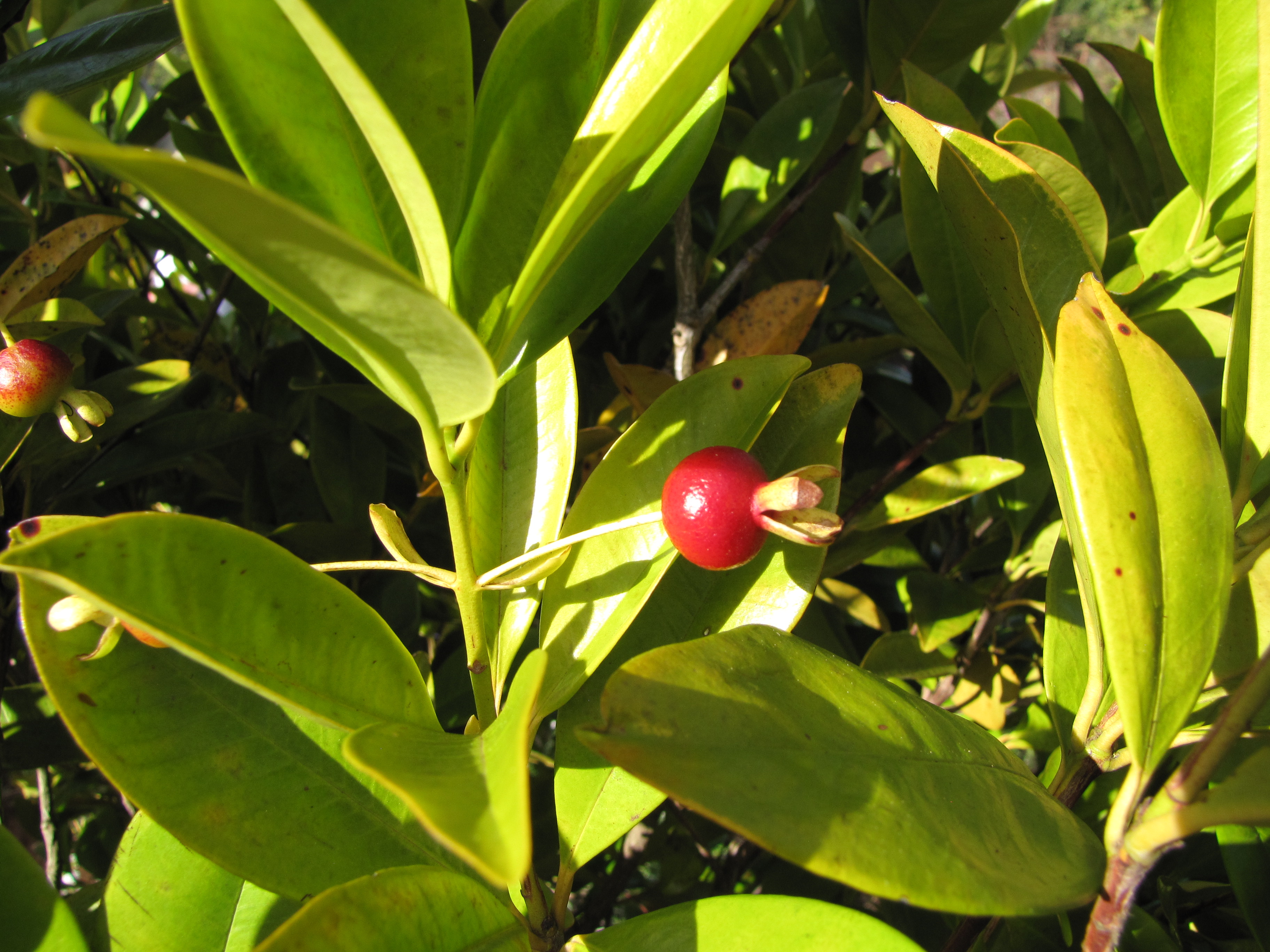
Grumichama in the tree
