= Pehr Löfling =

Swedish botanist (1729-1756)

- Born: 31 January 1729; Gästrikland, Sweden
- Died: 22 February 1756 (aged 27); Guayana Region, Venezuela
- Education: Uppsala University
- Scientific career
- Fields: Botany
- Academic advisors: Carl Linnaeus

Pehr Löfling (31 January 1729 – 22 February 1756) was a Swedish botanist and an apostle of Carl Linnaeus.

== Biography ==
Löfling was born in Tolvfors Bruk, Gävle, Sweden. He studied at the University of Uppsala where he attended courses taught by Carl Linnaeus. When the Spanish ambassador asked Linnaeus to select a botanist for service in the American colonies, the professor at once named Loefling. He went to Spain in 1751 to learn Spanish, and then embarked with other scientists for South America in February 1754. The Treaty of Madrid (13 January 1750) had fixed the colonial borders of Spain and Portugal. In Cumaná, Venezuela (then a Spanish colony) Löfling joined a project to demarcate the border with Brazil, the Expedicion de Limites al Orinoco. He was put in charge of a natural history department evaluating the resources of the region. Assisted by two young Spanish doctors, he was involved in the expedition for the remainder of his life.

He died in a remote mission San Antonio de Caroni, on the banks of the Caroní River near the modern city of Ciudad Guayana, Venezuela. His death was considered a great loss to natural history, and especially to botany. Linnæus believed the loss irreparable. The manuscripts of Löfling, which were found after his death, were preserved by his two assistants.

== Legacy ==
In 1753, Linnæus used the name Loeflingia for the genus of some plants in the family Caryophyllaceae, one species of which grows in Spain and the other in Spanish America. Then in 1923, Sprague published Pehria, a monotypic genus of plant from South America in family Lythraceae and also named after Löfling.

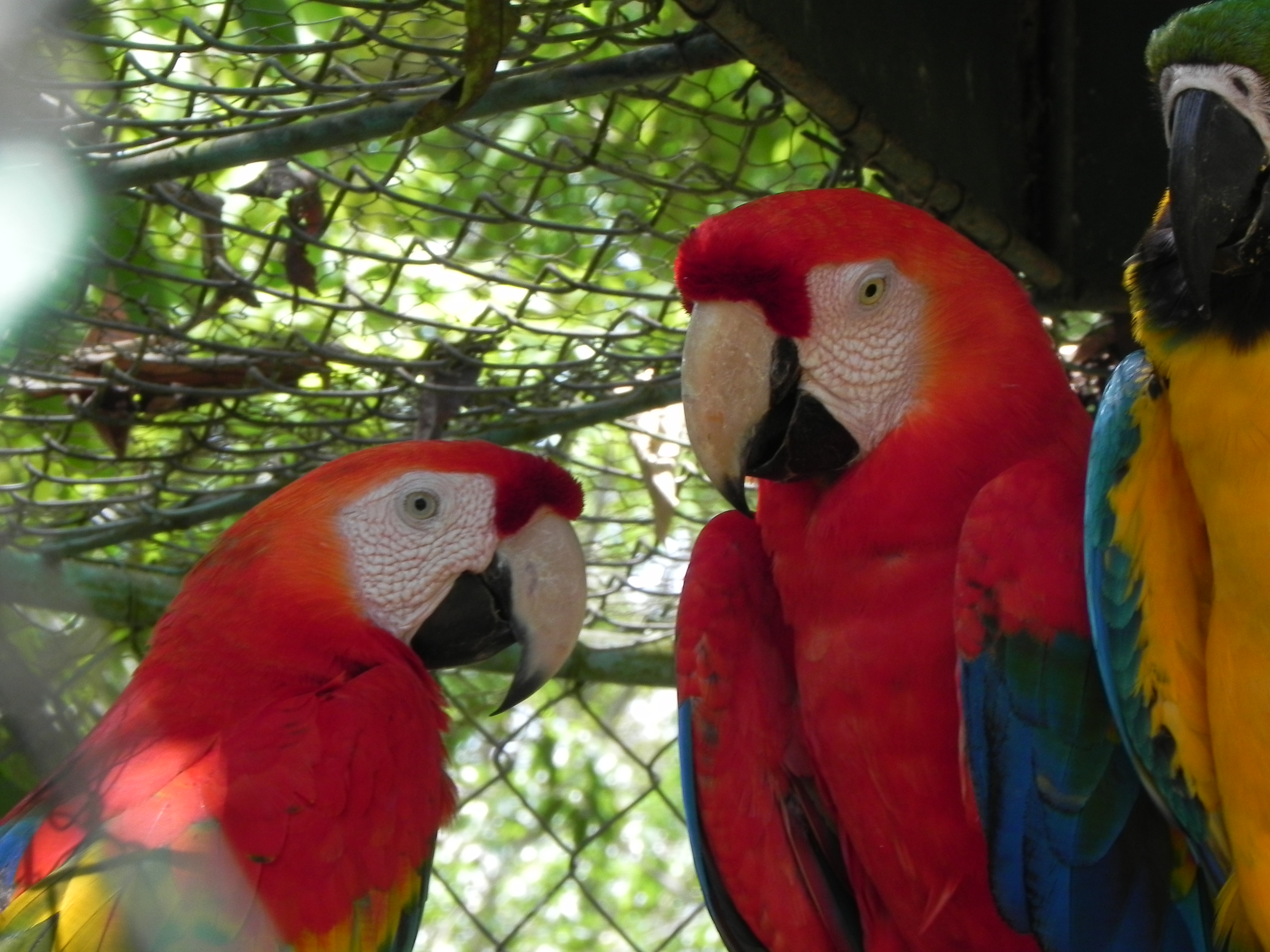
Venezuelan birds at Parque Loefling

Parque Löefling in Ciudad Guayana, Venezuela is named after him. The park includes a zoo.

=== Publications ===
Linnæus posthumously published his Iter Hispanicum, eller resa til Spanska Länderna uti Europa och America 1751 til 1756 in 1758.
