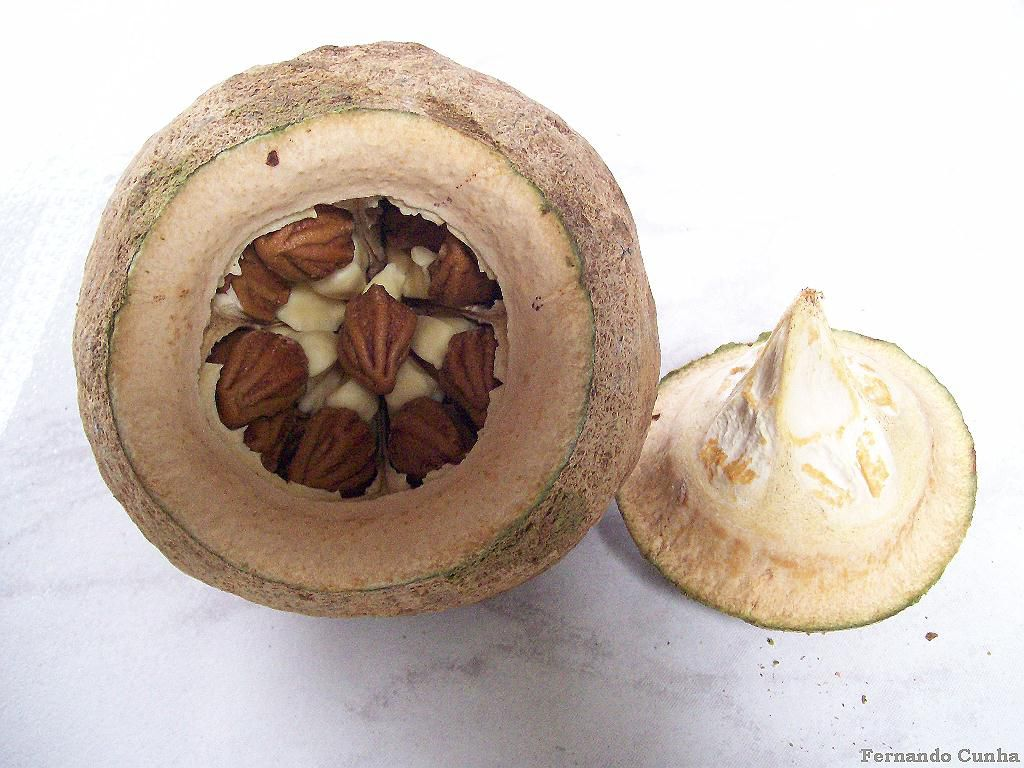

Scientific classification
- Kingdom: Plantae
- Clade: Tracheophytes
- Clade: Angiosperms
- Clade: Eudicots
- Clade: Asterids
- Order: Ericales
- Family: Lecythidaceae
- Genus: Lecythis
- Species: L. pisonis

Binomial name
- Lecythis pisonis Cambess. (1833)

= Lecythis pisonis =

Species of tree

Lecythis pisonis, the cream nut or monkey pot, is a tropical tree in the Brazil nut family Lecythidaceae. It is known in its native tropical America as sapucaia or castanha-de-sapucaia. The fruit is shaped like a cooking pot and contains edible seeds.

== Description ==
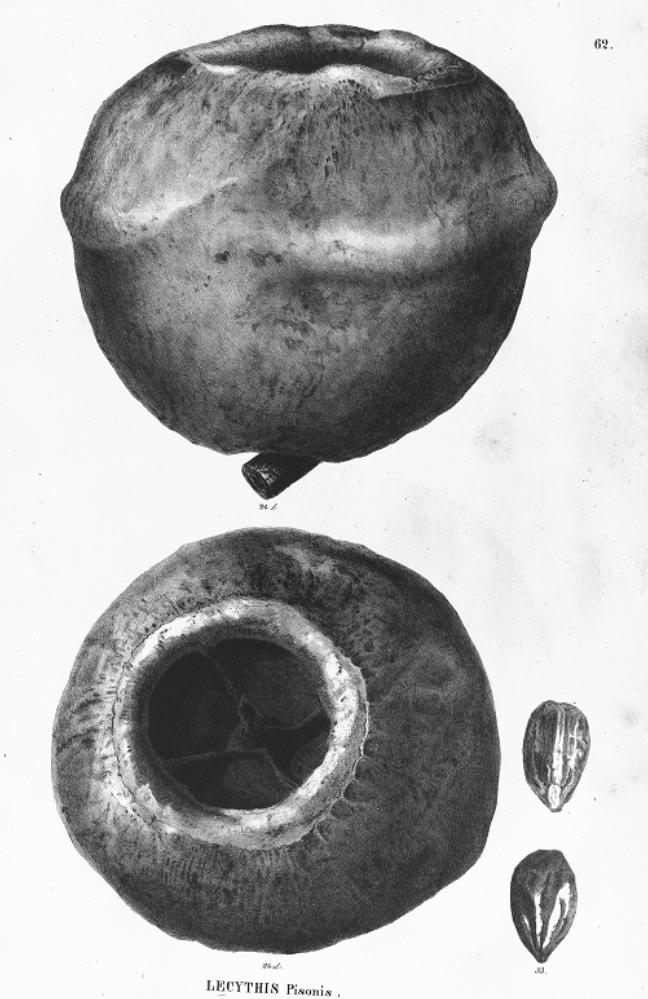
Dry fruit and seeds

Lecythis pisonis is a large, deciduous, dome shaped-tree with a dense leafy crown. It grows to a height of about 30 metres (98 ft). The trunk has ascending branches and much fissured, greyish bark. The leaves are pink as they unfurl but become mid-green with dark speckles later. They are leathery, oblong-elliptic with prominent midribs and toothed margins. The flowers form in racemes on the ends of the twigs in September and October. They are purple (occasionally white) with six petals and a central boss of golden stamens and are attractive to bees. The fruits are globose or oblong, cinnamon-coloured and woody, being 6 to 15 cm (2.4 to 5.9 in) long and 8.5 to 30 cm (3.3 to 11.8 in) wide. They have a rough pericarp up to 3 cm (1.2 in) thick and a tight-fitting lid that bursts open when they mature. The seeds are red or brown, elliptical and up to 5 cm (2.0 in) long. They take 11 to 12 months to ripen.

== Distribution ==
Lecythis pisonis grows in the rainforest in north and eastern tropical America particularly in Brazil.

== Uses ==
Lecythis pisonis is grown as an ornamental tree with new pink growth and purple flowers at certain times of year. The nuts are edible both raw and cooked. Research has shown that the lipid content is similar to that of corn oil but a high level of certain heavy metals might be toxic and may limit their use as food. They are also eaten by animals and the name "monkey pot" comes from the old proverb "a wise old monkey doesn't stick its hand into a pot". This refers to the fact that a young monkey may plunge its hand into the container and not be able to withdraw the fistful of nuts whereas an experienced individual will remove the nuts singly.
