= Guava (disambiguation) =

Guava are a type of tropical fruit, commonly from the species Psidium guajava, the "common guava". Guava may also refer to:

== Plants ==
- Guava paste, see Goiabada
- Feijoa sellowiana, pineapple guava
- Myrciaria floribunda, guavaberry
- the genus Psidium, particularly:
  - Psidium cattleyanum, strawberry guava, cherry guava, yellow guava, purple guava
  - Psidium dumetorum, Jamaican guava, an extinct species
  - Psidium friedrichsthalianum, Costa Rican guava
  - Psidium guajava, common guava, apple guava
  - Psidium guineense, Brazilian guava
  - Psidium rufum, purple guava
- Ugni molinae, Chilean guava

== Animals ==
- Guava skipper (Phocides polybius)
- Guava bird, Norfolk Island thrush (Turdus poliocephalus poliocephalus)

== Computing ==
- Google Guava, an open-source collection of libraries for the Java platform

== Geography ==
- Guava River

== Other ==
- Pure Guava, a 1992 album by Ween
