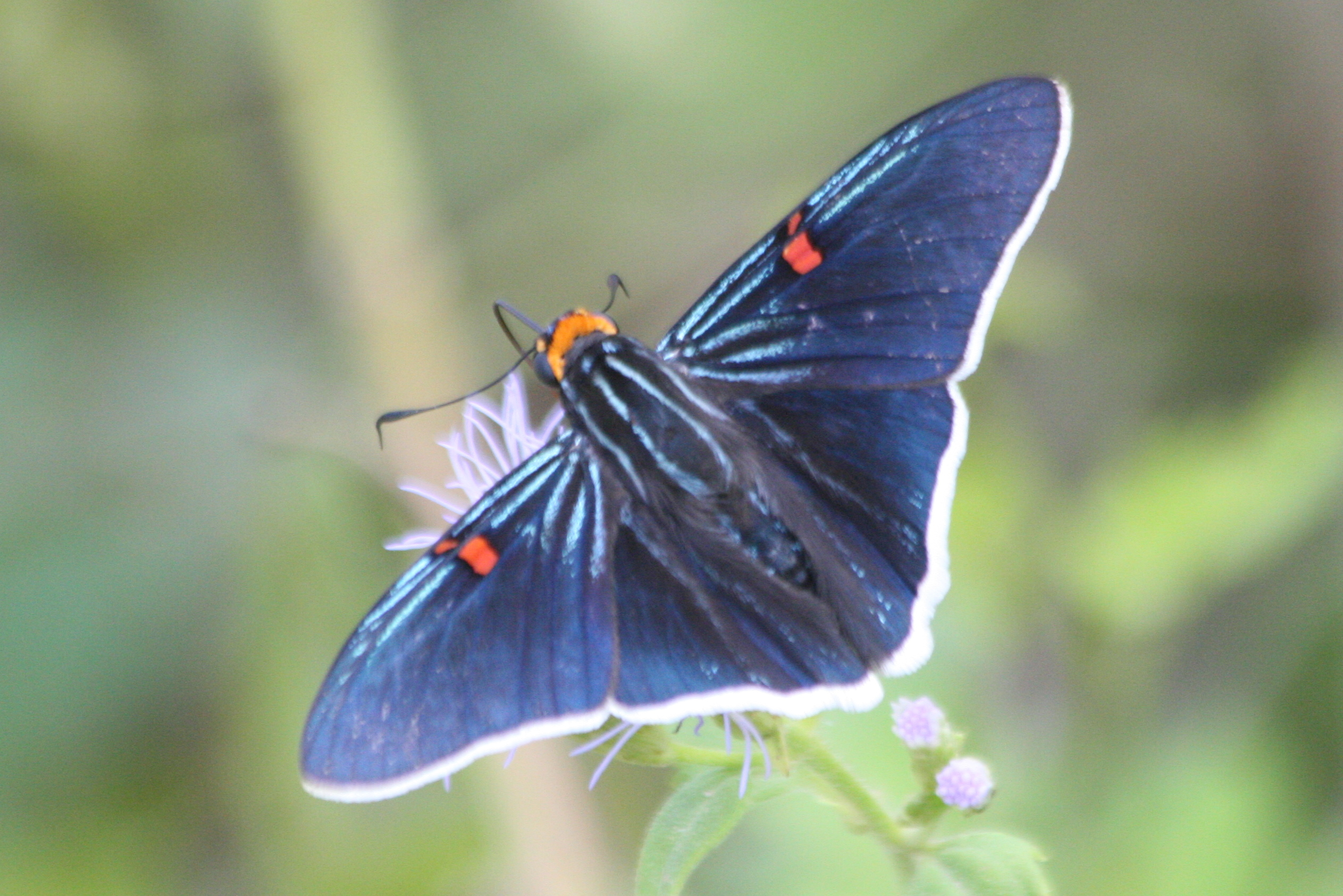

Scientific classification
- Kingdom: Animalia
- Phylum: Arthropoda
- Class: Insecta
- Order: Lepidoptera
- Family: Hesperiidae
- Genus: Phocides
- Species: P. polybius

Binomial name
- Phocides polybius (Fabricius, 1793)

Synonyms
- List: Hesperia polybius Fabricius, 1793; Papilio palemon Cramer, [1777]; Phocides cruentus Hübner, [1819]; Phocides palaemonides Röber, 1925; Erycides palemon; Phocides palemon; Erycides lilea Reakirt, [1867]; Erycides albicilla Herrich-Schäffer, 1869; Dysenius cruentus Scudder, 1872 (preocc. Hübner, [1819]); Erycides sanguinea Scudder, 1872; Erycides socius Butler & H. Druce, 1872; Erycides imbreus Plötz, 1879; Erycides decolor Mabille, 1880; Erycides spurius Mabille, 1880; Phocides albiciliata Röber, 1925

= Phocides polybius =

Species of butterfly

Phocides polybius, the bloody spot or guava skipper, is a species of butterfly in the skipper family, Hesperiidae, that is native to the Americas. It is found from the lower Rio Grande Valley of southern Texas in the United States south through Mexico and Central America to Argentina. The species was first described by Johan Christian Fabricius in 1793.

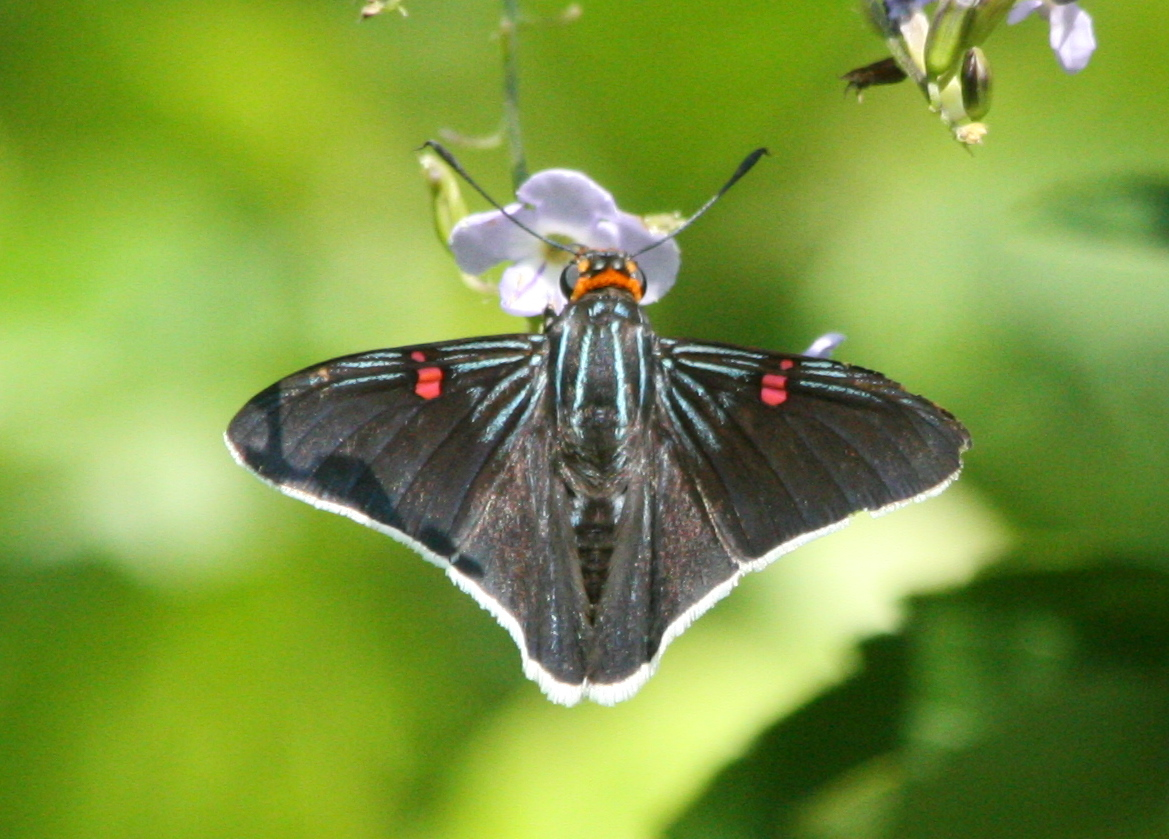

The wingspan is 42–63 mm (1.7–2.5 in). There are several generations with adults on wing in February, April, and June to December in southern Texas.

The larvae feed on Psidium species, including Psidium guajava and Psidium cattleianum. Adults probably feed on flower nectar.

== Subspecies ==
- Phocides polybius polybius (Suriname, Guyana)
- Phocides polybius lilea (Lower Rio Grande Valley of Texas, Mexico to Colombia, Brazil)
- Phocides polybius phanias (Argentina, Brazil)
