= Erycides =

Erycides may refer to two different groups of organisms:

- Erycides, a synonym for Erycinae, a subfamily of snakes
- Erycides, a synonym for Phocides, a genus of butterflies
