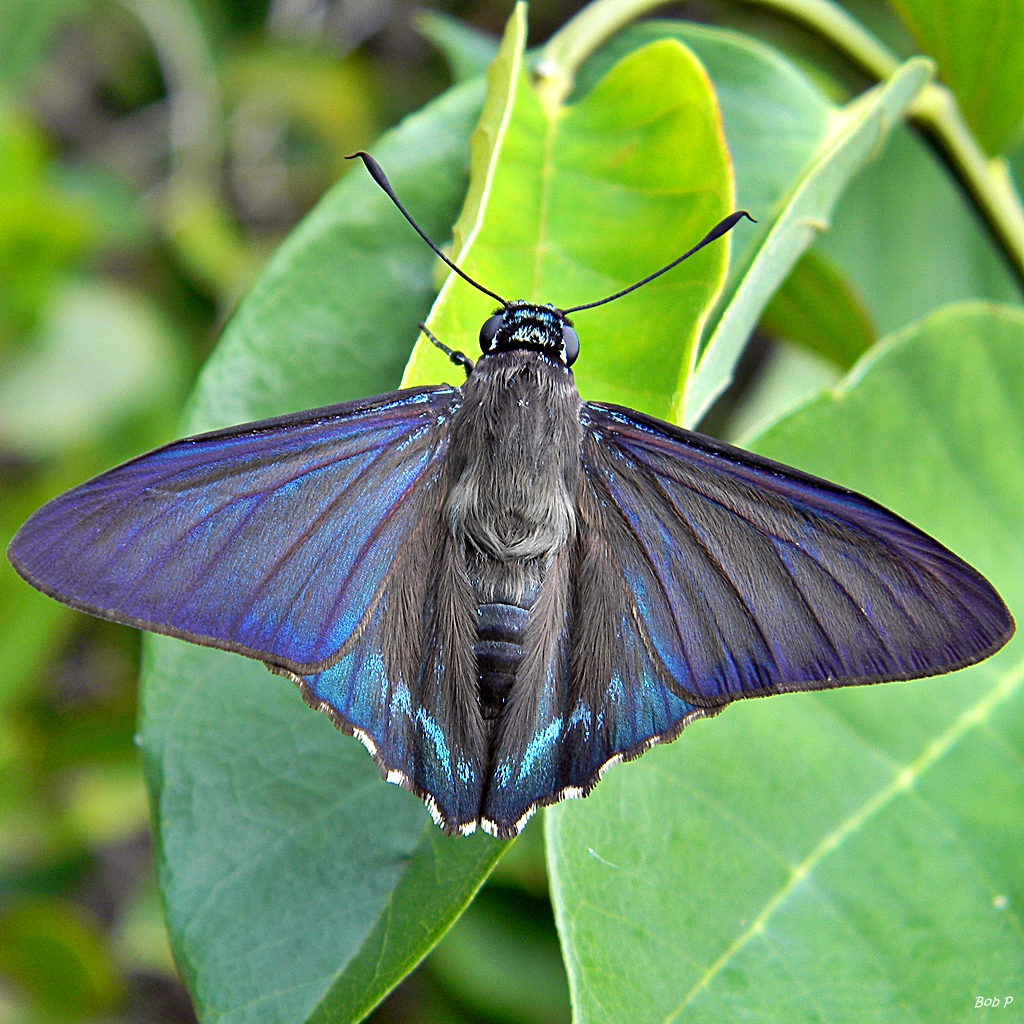
- Image of Mangrove Skipper

Scientific classification
- Kingdom: Animalia
- Phylum: Arthropoda
- Class: Insecta
- Order: Lepidoptera
- Family: Hesperiidae
- Genus: Phocides
- Species: P. pigmalion

Binomial name
- Phocides pigmalion (Cramer, [1779])

Synonyms
- List: Papilio pigmalion Cramer, [1779]; Erycides pigmalion (Cramer, [1779]); Phocides disparilis Röber, 1925; Phocides iocularis Röber, 1925; Phocides vulcanides Röber, 1925; Phocides tenuistriga Mabille & Boullet, 1912; Phocides aberrans Röber, 1925; Phocides jemadides Röber, 1925

= Phocides pigmalion =

Species of butterfly

Phocides pigmalion, the pigmalion skipper is a butterfly of the family Hesperiidae. It is found in the from Central America to Argentina. There is historical confusion with lineages that are subsequently treated as Phocides batabano or Phocides bicolora.

== Subspecies ==
- Phocides pigmalion pigmalion (Surinam, Colombia, Peru, Brazil)
- Pocides pigmalion hewitsonius (Brazil (Amazonas), Peru, Bolivia)
