= Psidium huanucoense =

Conservation status
- Endangered (IUCN 3.1)

Scientific classification
- Kingdom: Plantae
- Clade: Tracheophytes
- Clade: Angiosperms
- Clade: Eudicots
- Clade: Rosids
- Order: Myrtales
- Family: Myrtaceae
- Genus: Psidium
- Species: P. huanucoense

Binomial name
- Psidium huanucoense Landrum

Species of tree

Psidium huanucoense is a species of tree in the family Myrtaceae. It is a tree native to Peru. It grows from 6 to 15 metres tall. It is known from Huánuco and Pasco departments, including Yanachaga-Chemillén National Park in Pasco, where it grows in lowland and montane Amazon rainforest from 270 to 1,250 metres elevation.

The species was described by Leslie Roger Landrum in 2005.
