= Cataleya (given name) =

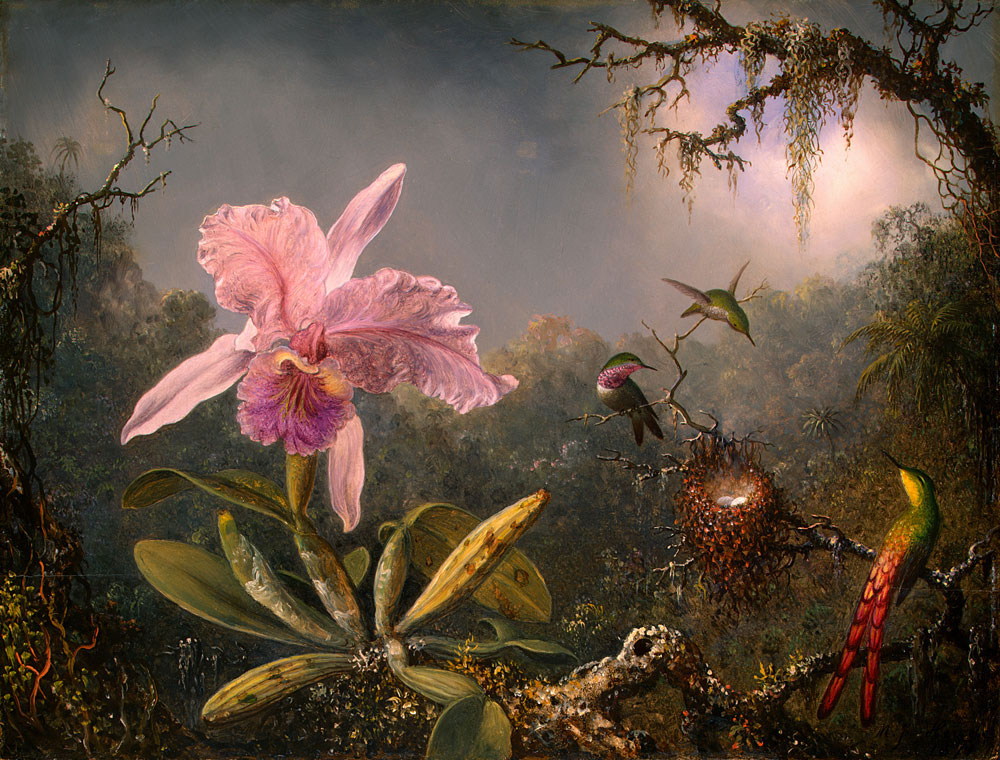
- Cattleya Orchid and Three Brazilian Hummingbirds by Martin Johnson Heade, 1871.
- Pronunciation: English: /ˈkɑːtəˈleɪjə/ or English: /ˈkætəˈleɪjə/ or English: /ˈkætəˈliːjə/ or English: /ˈkɑːtəˈliːjə/
- Gender: feminine

Origin
- Origin: English, Spanish
- Meaning: Variant spelling of Cattleya: /ˈkætliə/, a species of orchid named in honor of English botanist William Cattley.

Cataleya is a feminine given name, a variant spelling of Cattleya, a genus of orchid named in honor of English botanist William Cattley. The surname Cattley is said to be a transferred use of Catley, a one-time English place name in both Hertfordshire and Lincolnshire. The place name was ultimately derived from the Old English words catte, meaning cat and leah, meaning meadow or clearing, giving the meaning “from the meadow or clearing where wildcats dwell.” Another name for the Cattleya orchid is cat orchid. Others have made a connection between the name and cats because of the name’s starting syllable.

The name was popularized by a character in the 2011 film Colombiana, a young girl who grows up to be an assassin who seeks vengeance for the murder of her parents. It also came into greater use because it is a flower name and also similar in sound to other names that have been popular in recent years such as Aaliyah, Caitlin, and Leah. It is said to project an image of beauty and femininity. In some instances, variant spellings are considered more desirable than the original because the word Cattleya bears a similarity to the word cattle.

Different pronunciations of the name, some emphasized with phonetic spelling variants, are in use. Other variants of the name in use in the United States include Catalaya, Catalayah, Catalea, Cataleah, Cataleia, Cataleiya, Catalella, Cataleyah, Catalia, Cataliyah, Catelaya, Cateleya, Cathaleya, Cattalaya, Cattaleya, Cattleya, Katalaya, Katalea, Kataleah, Kataleia, Kataleigha, Kataleya, Kataleyah, Katalia, Kataliya, Kataliyah, Kathaleya, Kathalia, Kathaliya, Katilaya, Katliya, Kattalaya, Kattaleia, Kattaleya, and Kattleya.

== Usage ==
It has been among the five hundred most popular names for girls born in the United States since 2012 and among the three hundred most popular names in 2021. Variant spelling Kataleya has been among the one thousand most popular names for newborn American girls since 2018. The name was among the top two hundred names for American girls in 2022 if all spellings of the name are combined.

The name has been among the top 100 names for newborn girls in Puerto Rico since 2018, in Chile since 2021, in Spain since 2022, in Uruguay since 2022, and in Moldova since 2023. It has been among the top 200 names for newborn girls in Belgium since 2020; was among the top 1,000 names for newborn girls in Canada in 2021; among the top 1,000 names in use for newborn girls in England and Wales since 2017 and among the top 500 there since 2021; among the top 500 names for newborn girls in France since 2013 and among the top 200 names for girls there since 2019; and among the top 500 names in use for newborn girls in the Netherlands since 2013.

== Fictional characters ==
- Cataleya Restrepo from Colombiana
