= Psidium striatulum =

Conservation status
- Least Concern (IUCN 3.1)

Scientific classification
- Kingdom: Plantae
- Clade: Tracheophytes
- Clade: Angiosperms
- Clade: Eudicots
- Clade: Rosids
- Order: Myrtales
- Family: Myrtaceae
- Genus: Psidium
- Species: P. striatulum

Binomial name
- Psidium striatulum DC.

Synonyms
- Psidium striatulum var. rondoniense Landrum; Psidium striatulum var. striatulum

Species of plant

Psidium striatulum is a species of flowering plant in the family Myrtaceae. It is a shrub or tree native to Bolivia, Brazil, Guyana, Suriname, and Venezuela. It grows in lowland tropical moist forest.

== Description ==
It is a shrub or tree and grows primarily in the seasonally dry tropical biome. Its common names include narrow-leaf guava, araçá-mirim, or araçari.

The tree produces yellow sweet fruits with a flavor similar to the common guava. The fruits are consumed fresh and are commonly utilized in traditional medicine to treat diarrhea and infections.
