= Psidium acidum =

Scientific classification
- Kingdom: Plantae
- Clade: Tracheophytes
- Clade: Angiosperms
- Clade: Eudicots
- Clade: Rosids
- Order: Myrtales
- Family: Myrtaceae
- Genus: Psidium
- Species: P. acidum

Binomial name
- Psidium acidum (DC.) Landrum

Synonyms
- Britoa acida (DC.) O.Berg; Psidium acutangulum var. acidum DC.

Species of tree

Psidium acidum is a species of tree in the family Myrtaceae. It is native to Peru and Ecuador.
