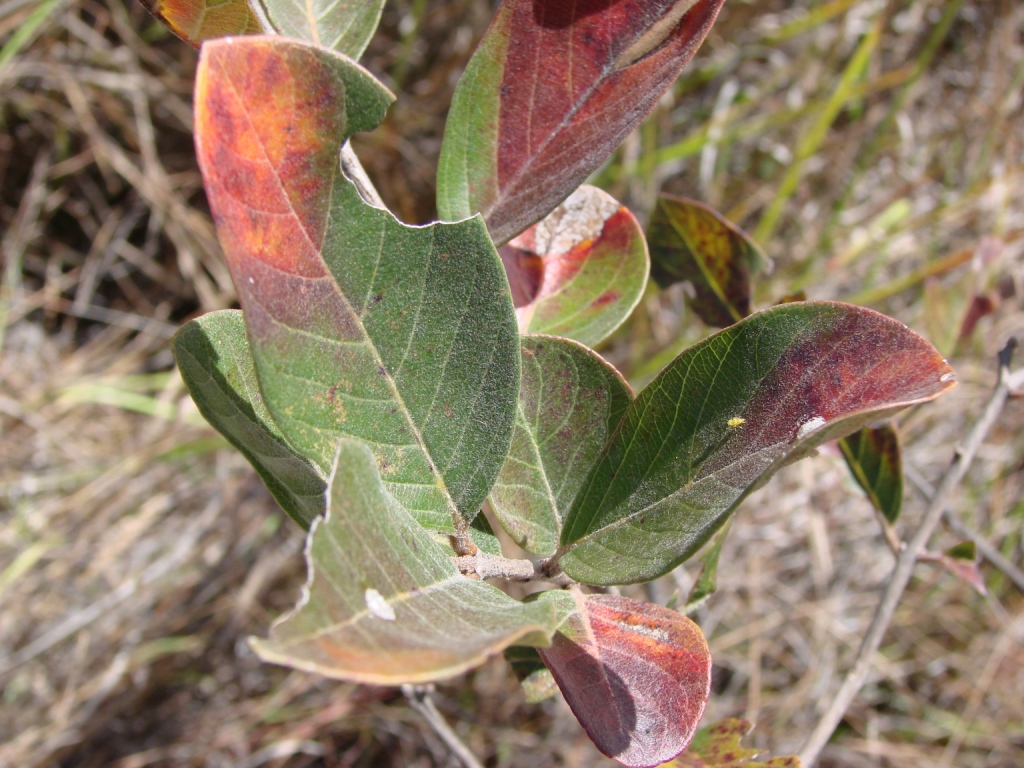

Conservation status
- Least Concern (IUCN 3.1)

Scientific classification
- Kingdom: Plantae
- Clade: Tracheophytes
- Clade: Angiosperms
- Clade: Eudicots
- Clade: Rosids
- Order: Myrtales
- Family: Myrtaceae
- Genus: Psidium
- Species: P. grandifolium

Binomial name
- Psidium grandifolium Mart. ex DC.

Synonyms
- Synonymy: Guajava cinerea (Mart. ex DC.) Kuntze; Guajava grandifolia (Mart. ex DC.) Kuntze; Guajava incanescens (Mart. ex DC.) Kuntze; Guajava lactea (O.Berg) Kuntze; Guajava microcarpa (Cambess.) Kuntze; Guajava radicans (O.Berg) Kuntze; Guajava riedeliana (O.Berg) Kuntze; Guajava rubescens (O.Berg) Kuntze; Guajava sericea (O.Berg) Kuntze; Psidium albidum Miq.; Psidium apaense Barb.Rodr.; Psidium cinereum Mart. ex DC.; Psidium cinereum var. angustifolium O.Berg; Psidium cinereum var. brevipes O.Berg; Psidium cinereum var. grandifolium O.Berg; Psidium cinereum var. incanescens (Mart. ex DC.) D.Legrand; Psidium cinereum var. intermedium O.Berg; Psidium cinereum var. paraguariae D.Legrand; Psidium cuneatum var. incanescens O.Berg; Psidium eriophyllum Barb.Rodr.; Psidium grandifolium var. albidum O.Berg; Psidium grandifolium var. heterophyllum O.Berg; Psidium grandifolium var. incanescens O.Berg; Psidium grandifolium var. intermedium O.Berg; Psidium grandifolium var. parvifolium O.Berg; Psidium grandifolium var. tenuinerve O.Berg; Psidium grandifolium var. ternatifolium (Cambess.) O.Berg; Psidium incanescens Mart. ex DC.; Psidium incanescens var. cuneatum O.Berg; Psidium incanescens var. parvifolium O.Berg; Psidium incanescens var. rotundifolium O.Berg; Psidium lacteum O.Berg; Psidium lanatum Barb.Rodr.; Psidium microcarpum Cambess.; Psidium paraguayense Barb.Rodr.; Psidium psychrophyllum Barb.Rodr.; Psidium radicans O.Berg; Psidium riedelianum O.Berg; Psidium sericeum O.Berg; Psidium spodophyllum Barb.Rodr.; Psidium ternatifolium Cambess.; Psidium tomentosum Parodi; Psidium yacaense Barb.Rodr.

= Psidium grandifolium =

Species of flowering plant

Psidium grandifolium is a species of flowering plant in the family Myrtaceae. It is a shrub native to Brazil, eastern Bolivia, northeastern Argentina, and Paraguay. A relative of guava, it is sometimes used in herbal concoctions.
