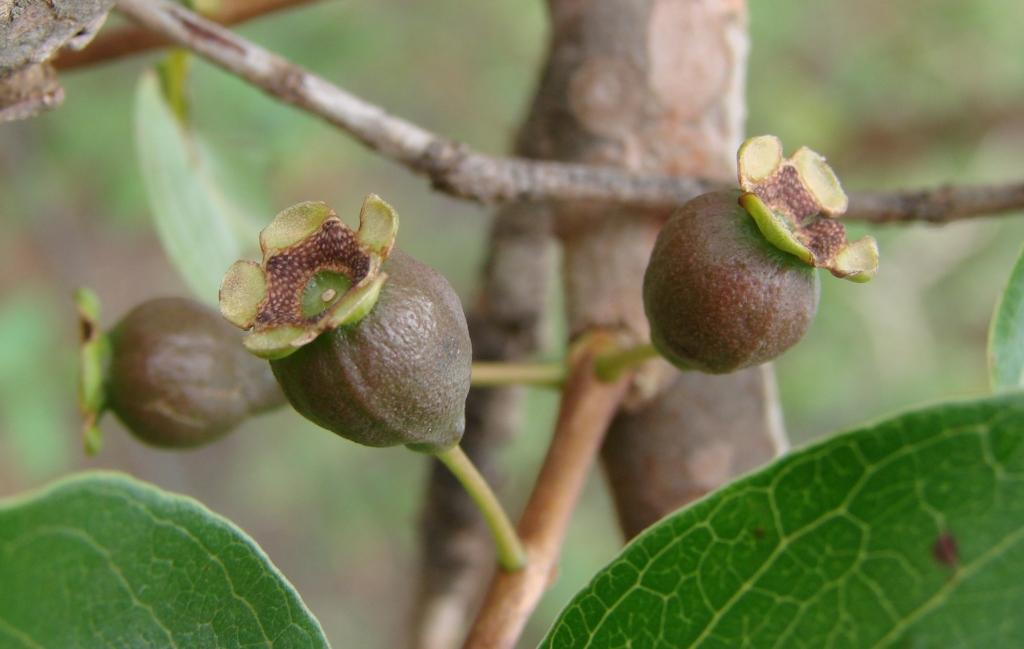

Scientific classification
- Kingdom: Plantae
- Clade: Tracheophytes
- Clade: Angiosperms
- Clade: Eudicots
- Clade: Rosids
- Order: Myrtales
- Family: Myrtaceae
- Genus: Psidium
- Species: P. myrtoides

Binomial name
- Psidium myrtoides O. Berg 1857

Synonyms
- Psidium myrsinoides O.Berg; Guajava myrtoides (O.Berg) Kuntze; Guajava myrsinoides (O.Berg) Kuntze

= Psidium myrtoides =

Species of tree

Psidium myrtoides, commonly known as purple forest guava or araçá-una, is a species of plant in the family Myrtaceae. It is found in Atlantic Forest in São Paulo and northern Paraná, Brazil. The plant grows up to 4–6 meter and sometimes 8 meters tall. It blooms from October to December with solitary white flowers. Fruits are round and 2.5–4.2 cm wide with a reddish pulp that is somewhat bitter and with around ten white seeds.

It is sometimes misidentified as the nonexistent Psidium eugeniaefolia.

The plant is tolerant of different types of soil with pH ranging from 5.5 to 6.2. It can take temperatures of up to −4 degrees Celsius.

== Gallery ==
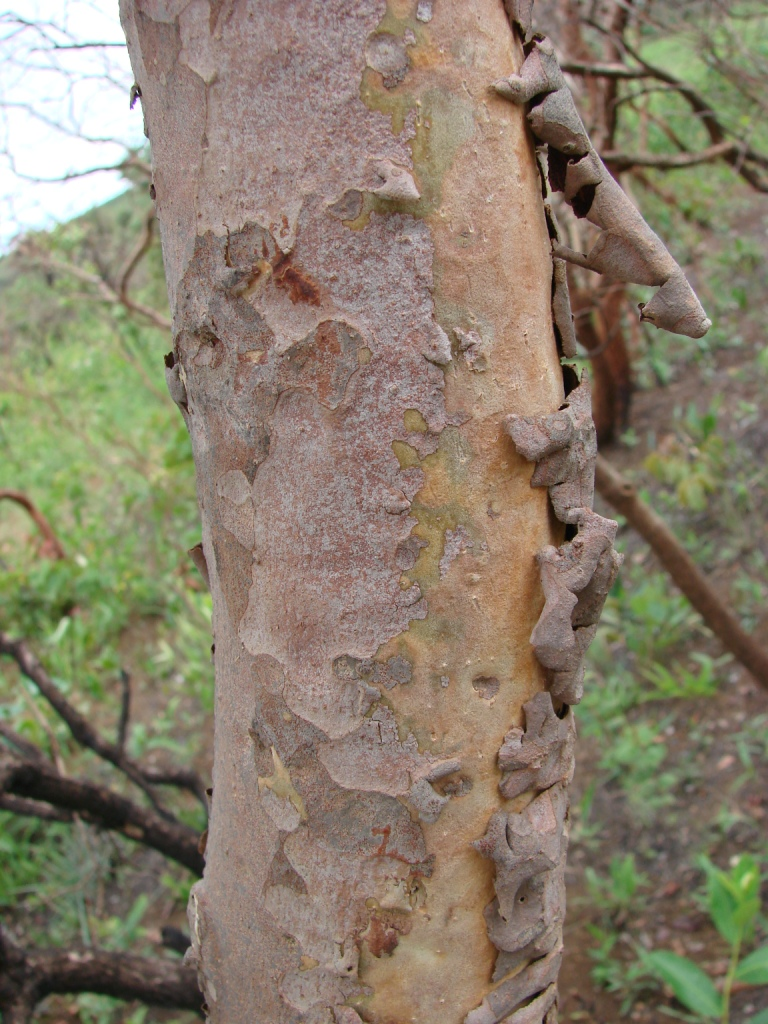

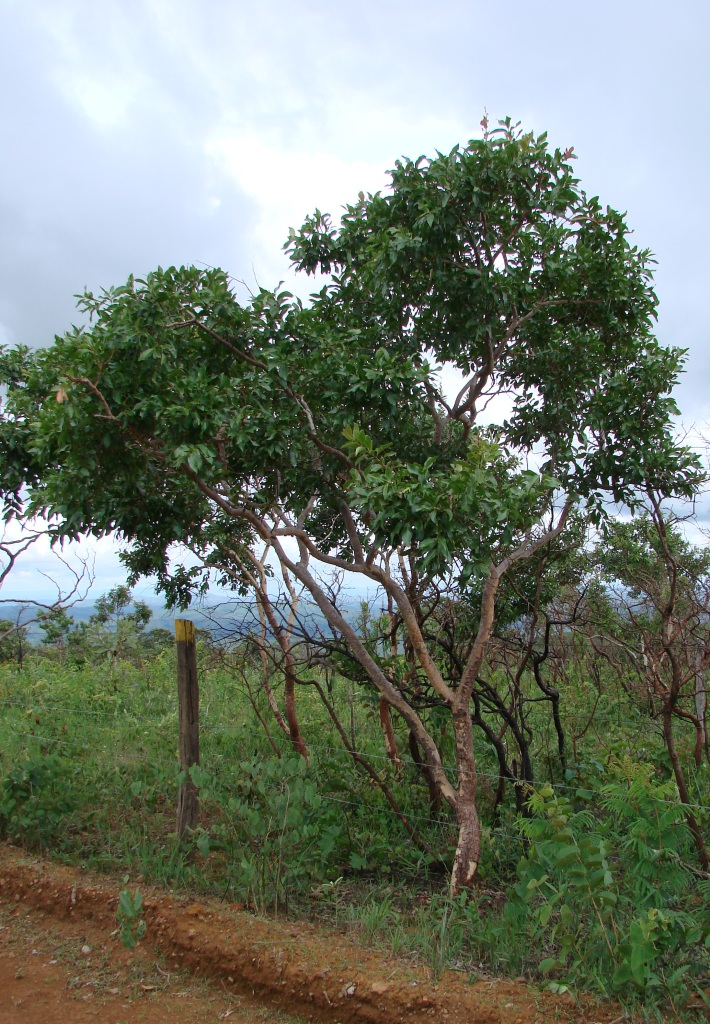

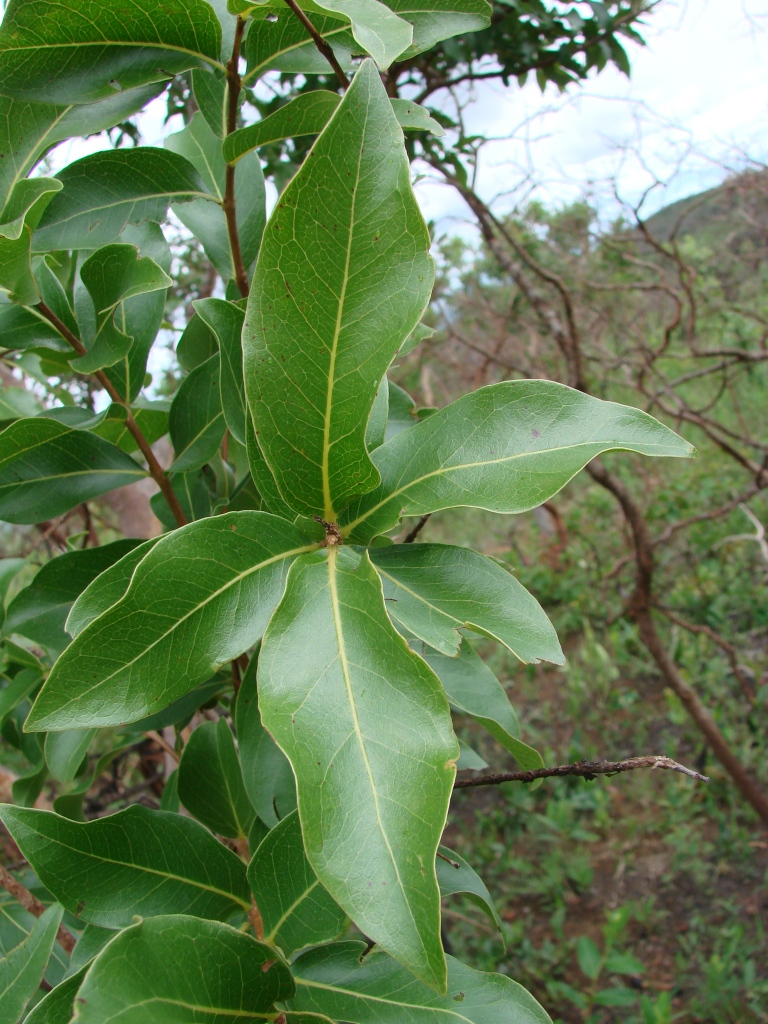
