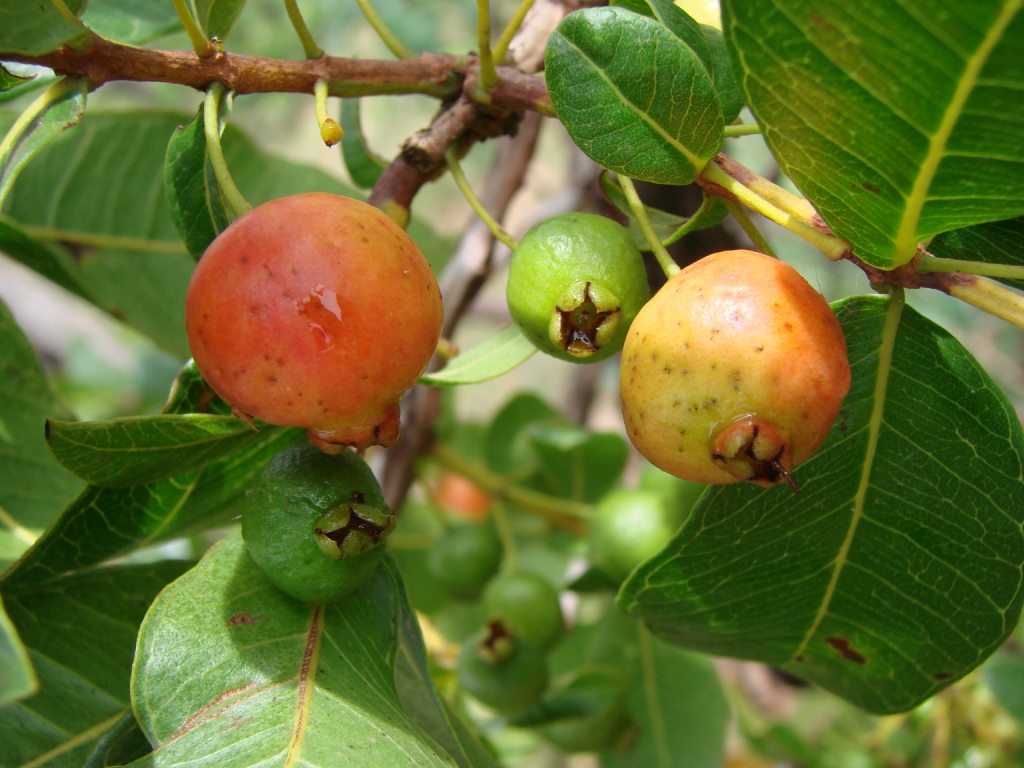

Conservation status
- Least Concern (IUCN 3.1)

Scientific classification
- Kingdom: Plantae
- Clade: Tracheophytes
- Clade: Angiosperms
- Clade: Eudicots
- Clade: Rosids
- Order: Myrtales
- Family: Myrtaceae
- Genus: Psidium
- Species: P. longipetiolatum

Binomial name
- Psidium longipetiolatum D.Legrand (1961)

= Psidium longipetiolatum =

Species of tree

Psidium longipetiolatum or araca vermelho is a species of plant in the family Myrtaceae. It is found growing on the hillsides of the Atlantic Forest in the states of Paraná and Santa Catarina, Brazil. It grows 4–6 meters tall and up to 30 meters in cultivation. Plants fruit from January to March.
