= Psidium pedicellatum =

Conservation status
- Least Concern (IUCN 3.1)

Scientific classification
- Kingdom: Plantae
- Clade: Tracheophytes
- Clade: Angiosperms
- Clade: Eudicots
- Clade: Rosids
- Order: Myrtales
- Family: Myrtaceae
- Genus: Psidium
- Species: P. pedicellatum

Binomial name
- Psidium pedicellatum McVaugh

Species of shrub

Psidium pedicellatum is a species of plant in the family Myrtaceae. It is a fruiting shrub or small tree endemic to Ecuador.
