= Psidium rostratum =

Conservation status
- Vulnerable (IUCN 3.1)

Scientific classification
- Kingdom: Plantae
- Clade: Tracheophytes
- Clade: Angiosperms
- Clade: Eudicots
- Clade: Rosids
- Order: Myrtales
- Family: Myrtaceae
- Genus: Psidium
- Species: P. rostratum

Binomial name
- Psidium rostratum McVaugh

Species of tree

Psidium rostratum is a species of tree in the family Myrtaceae. It is native to western Ecuador and northwestern Peru. It can attain a height of 10 meters. It is known from Guayas, Loja, and Guayaquil provinces of Ecuador and Tumbes Department of Peru, where it grows in lowland and lower montane tropical moist forests up to 1,200 metres elevation. The IUCN Red List assesses it as a vulnerable species.
