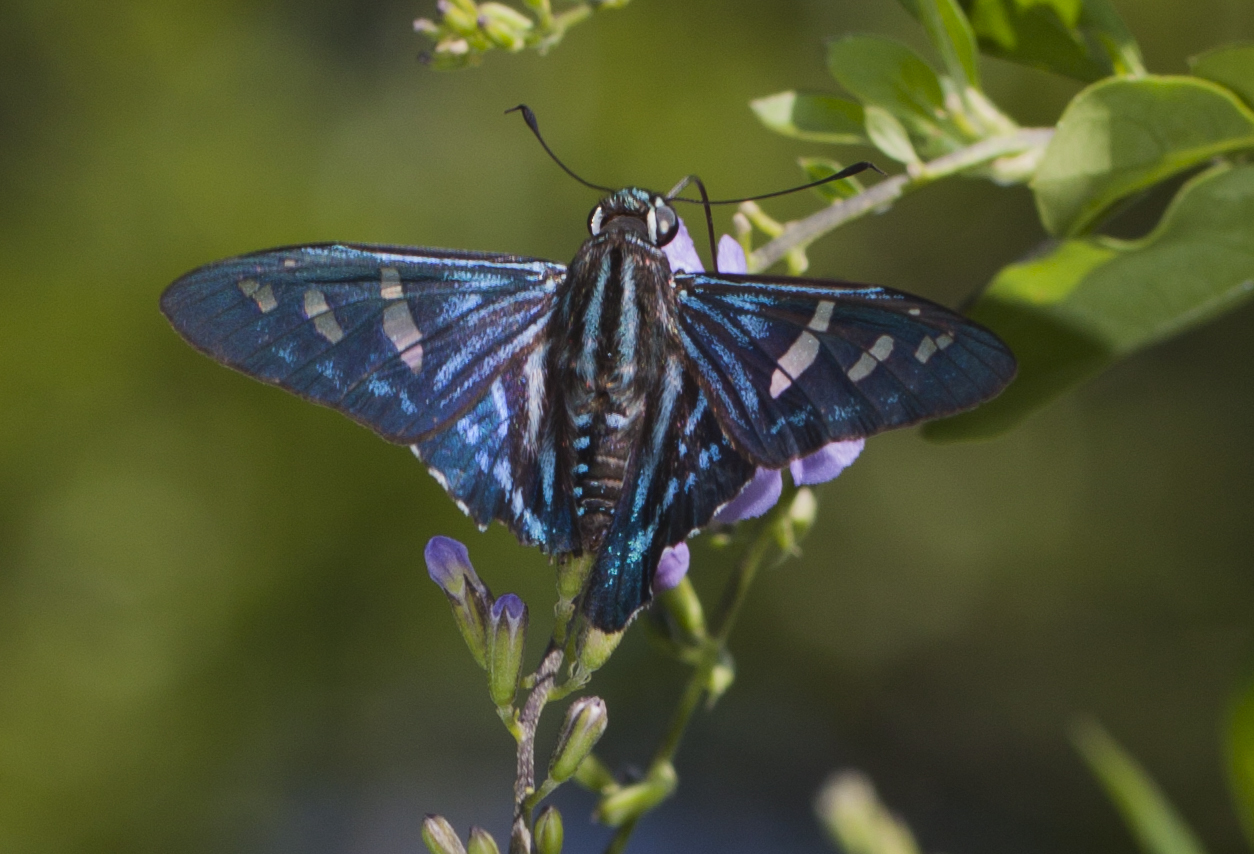

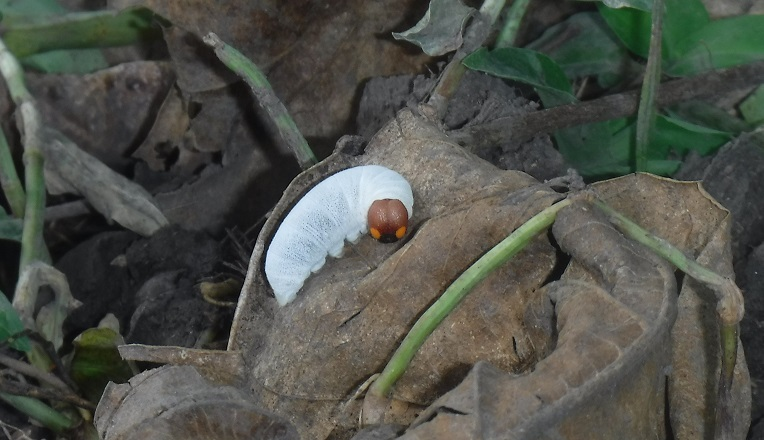
- Adult (top) and larva (bottom)

Scientific classification
- Kingdom: Animalia
- Phylum: Arthropoda
- Class: Insecta
- Order: Lepidoptera
- Family: Hesperiidae
- Genus: Phocides
- Species: P. bicolora

Binomial name
- Phocides bicolora (Boddaert, 1783)

Synonyms
- Sphinx bicolora Boddaert, 1783; Erycides pyres Godman & Salvin, 1879; Phocides pigmalion bicolora (Boddaert, 1783)

= Phocides bicolora =

Species of butterfly

Phocides bicolora, the Hispaniolan mangrove skipper, is a species of skipper in the family Hesperiidae. It is found on Hispanola. Alternatively, it has also been classified as a subsbspecies of Phocides pigmalion.
