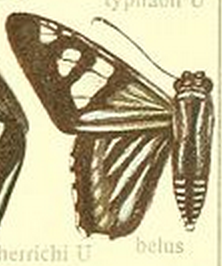

Scientific classification
- Kingdom: Animalia
- Phylum: Arthropoda
- Class: Insecta
- Order: Lepidoptera
- Family: Hesperiidae
- Genus: Phocides
- Species: P. belus

Binomial name
- Phocides belus Godman & Salvin, 1890

= Phocides belus =

Species of butterfly

Phocides belus, the beautiful beamer or Belus skipper, is a skipper in the family Hesperiidae. It is found from Mexico to Costa Rica. Strays have been reported as far north as Texas.

The wings have a powder-blue hue.

Last instar larvae reach a length of 38 mm. They are mostly uniform white with a light brown head capsule. They feed on Thouinidium decandrum.
