= Psidium harrisianum =

Conservation status
- Near Threatened (IUCN 2.3)

Scientific classification
- Kingdom: Plantae
- Clade: Tracheophytes
- Clade: Angiosperms
- Clade: Eudicots
- Clade: Rosids
- Order: Myrtales
- Family: Myrtaceae
- Genus: Psidium
- Species: P. harrisianum

Binomial name
- Psidium harrisianum Urb.

Species of flowering plant

Psidium harrisianum is a species of plant in the family Myrtaceae. It is endemic to Jamaica. Pests of Psidium harrisianum include various moth species such as Indarbela quadrinotata.
