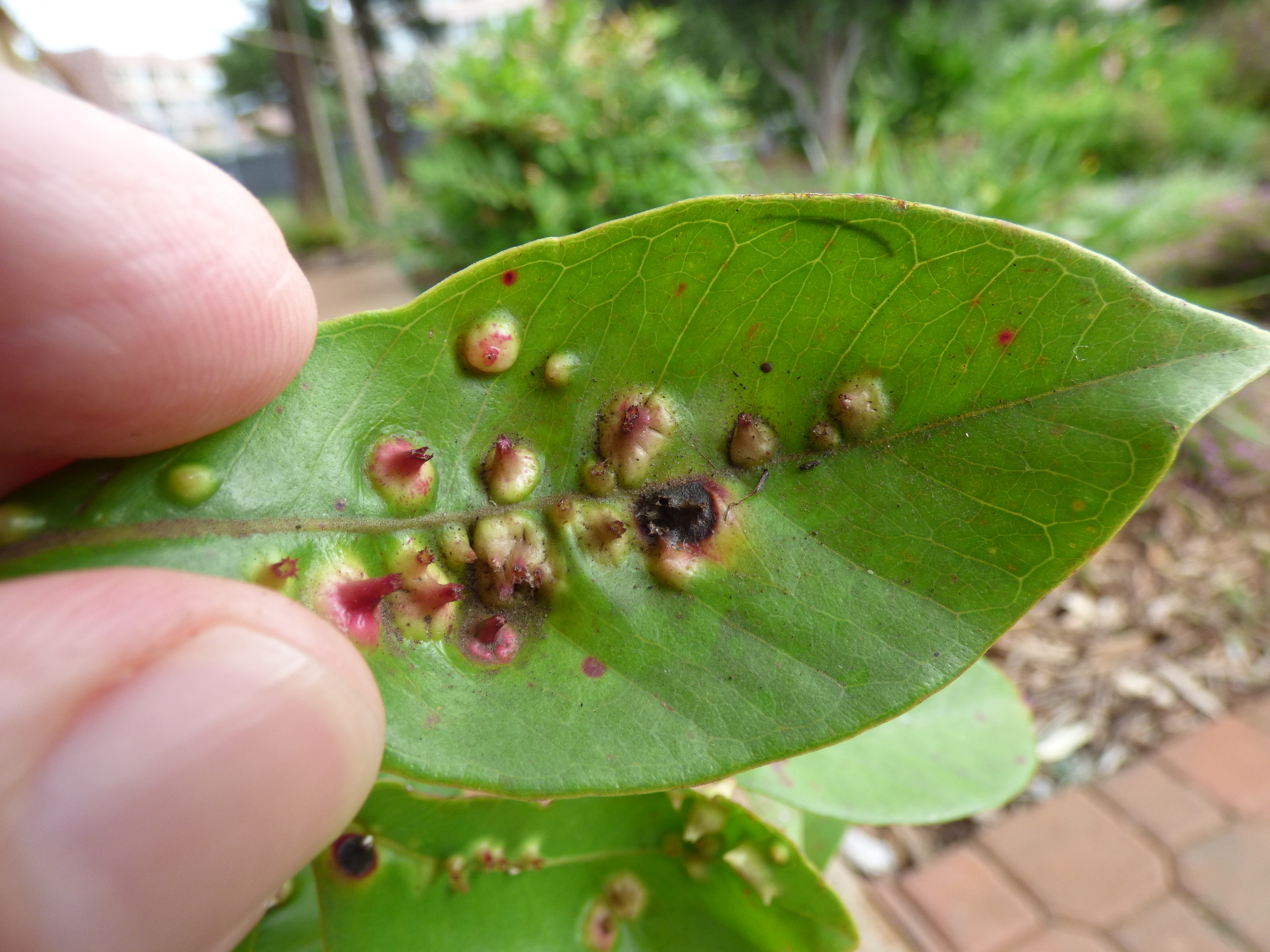

Scientific classification
- Kingdom: Animalia
- Phylum: Arthropoda
- Class: Insecta
- Order: Hemiptera
- Suborder: Sternorrhyncha
- Family: Eriococcidae
- Genus: Tectococcus
- Species: T. ovatus'

Binomial name
- Tectococcus ovatus' Hempel, 1900

= Tectococcus ovatus =

Species of bug

Tectococcus ovatus (Hemiptera: Eriococcidae), also called the Brazilian Scale, is a scale insect in the family Eriococcidae. It is most widely known for being a potential biological control agent for Psidium cattleyanum (strawberry guava) in Florida, and Hawaii. The insect forms leaf galls on strawberry guava. Extensive testing has shown that this species is very host-specific.
