= Psidium raimondii =

Scientific classification
- Kingdom: Plantae
- Clade: Tracheophytes
- Clade: Angiosperms
- Clade: Eudicots
- Clade: Rosids
- Order: Myrtales
- Family: Myrtaceae
- Genus: Psidium
- Species: P. raimondii

Binomial name
- Psidium raimondii Burret

Species of plant

Psidium raimondii is a species of plant in the family Myrtaceae. It is native to Peru.
