= William Cattley =

British merchant and horticulturist

- Born: 1788; Garlickhythe, London
- Died: 8 August 1835 (aged 46–47); London Borough of Barnet
- Occupations: merchant horticulturist

William Cattley (1788 – 8 August 1835) was a British merchant and horticulturist. He was significantly involved with the trade between Britain and Russia, including the importation of grain (generically called "corn") to England. He also collected, and had others collect on his behalf, plants from locations throughout the world. He was particularly fond of orchids.

Cattley was born in Garlickhythe ('garlic dock'), City of London, to a large merchant family. Many of Cattley's factors were members of his extended family, for example his cousin John Prescott headed up the firm's offices in St. Petersburg from which he ran the Russian side of the trade. Prescott was an enthusiastic collector of plants, and forwarded large numbers back to England for Cattley. In 1818 Cattley was unpacking a shipment that he had received from Brazil. Among the various materials he found un-preposessing tendrils which might be an orchid, so he nurtured it back to health and it turned out to be the beautiful orchid, which John Lindley named in Cattley's honour as Cattleya labiata (the "corsage orchid"). The year previously William Swainson had discovered the orchid in the wild in the Brazilian state of Pernambuco and dispatched a specimen along with other plants to Cattley via the Glasgow Botanic Gardens.

To help with his collection Cattley had hired John Lindley to draw, describe and catalog the novel plants in his garden at Barnet. Cattley paid for the publication of Lindley's monograph on digitalis, Digitalium Monographia, and later for Lindley’s Collectanea Botanica (1821) a catalogue of Cattley’s plant collection. However, after 1821 due to financial reverses, Cattley was no longer able to pay Lindley a salary.

William Cattley died at his home, "Cattley Close", Wood Street, in Barnet on 8 August 1835. A blue plaque has been placed on the house which says: William Cattley, Botanist, 1788-1835, lived in this house.

The guava species Psidium cattleyanum Afzel. ex Sabine is named after him

== See also ==
- Cataleya (given name)
