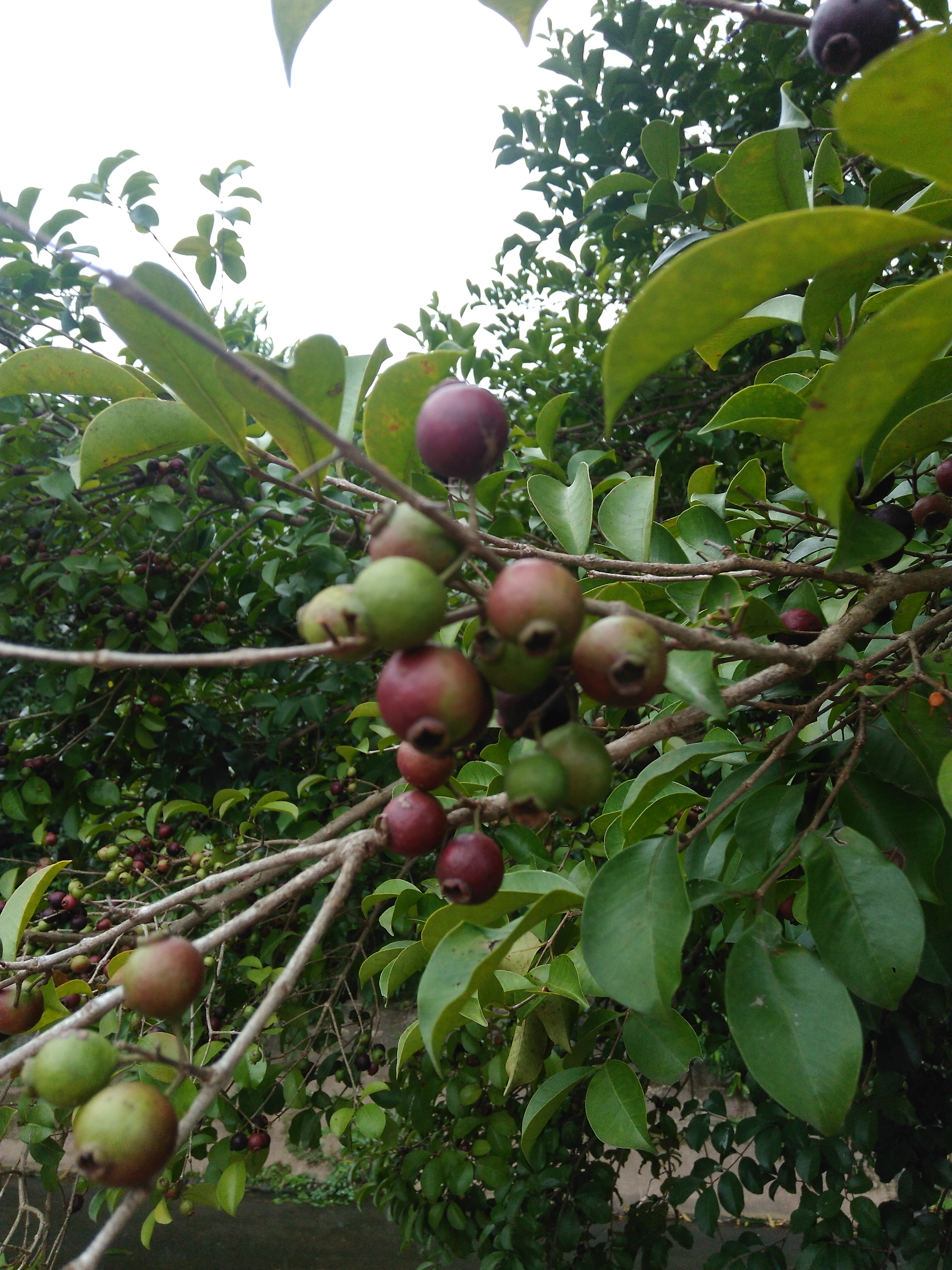

Conservation status
- Least Concern (IUCN 3.1)

Scientific classification
- Kingdom: Plantae
- Clade: Tracheophytes
- Clade: Angiosperms
- Clade: Eudicots
- Clade: Rosids
- Order: Myrtales
- Family: Myrtaceae
- Genus: Psidium
- Species: P. rufum

Binomial name
- Psidium rufum Mart. ex DC.

Synonyms
- Synonymy: Abbevillea recurvata O.Berg; Abbevillea regeliana O.Berg; Campomanesia martiana O.Berg; Campomanesia recurvata (O.Berg) Nied.; Campomanesia regeliana (O.Berg) Kiaersk.; Guajava cuprea (O.Berg) Kuntze; Guajava macrosperma (O.Berg) Kuntze; Guajava pilosa (Vell.) Kuntze; Guajava widgreniana (O.Berg) Kuntze; Psidium aerugineum O.Berg; Psidium aerugineum var. angustifolium O.Berg; Psidium araca var. sampaionis Herter; Psidium cupreum O.Berg; Psidium cupreum var. glabratum Kiaersk.; Psidium lagoense Kiaersk.; Psidium macrospermum O.Berg; Psidium pilosum Vell.; Psidium pilosum var. rotundifolium (Kiaersk.) Mattos; Psidium rufum var. rotundifolium Kiaersk.; Psidium widgrenianum O.Berg

= Psidium rufum =

Species of flowering plant

Psidium rufum is commonly known as the purple guava. It is a shrub endemic to Brazil. It is native to the Atlantic forest and Cerrado regions of eastern, central, and southern Brazil. The IUCN Red List assesses the species as Least Concern.
