= Phocides batabano =

Scientific classification
- Kingdom: Animalia
- Phylum: Arthropoda
- Class: Insecta
- Order: Lepidoptera
- Family: Hesperiidae
- Genus: Phocides
- Species: P. batabano

Binomial name
- Phocides batabano Lucas, 1857

Synonyms
- Eudamus batabano Lucas, 1857; Erycides mancinus Herrich-Schäffer, 1862; Erycides batabano; [?] Lefèbre, 1867

Species of butterfly

Phocides batabano, including the mangrove skipper, is a skipper in the family Hesperiidae. It is found in North America, namely in the United States from coast to coast in peninsular Florida and the Florida Keys, Cuba and adjacent regions like the Bahamas and Cayman Island. In many other works, the lineages are linked with Phocides pigmalion (Cramer, 1779), e.g. as subspecies of that per Lamas, 2004.

The wingspan is 48–70 mm. Adults are on the wing from November to August in southern Florida. The larvae feed on Rhizophora mangle species. Adults feed on nectar of various plants, including mangrove, shepherd's needle, citrus, and bougainvillaea flowers. Strays may be found up to coastal South Carolina.

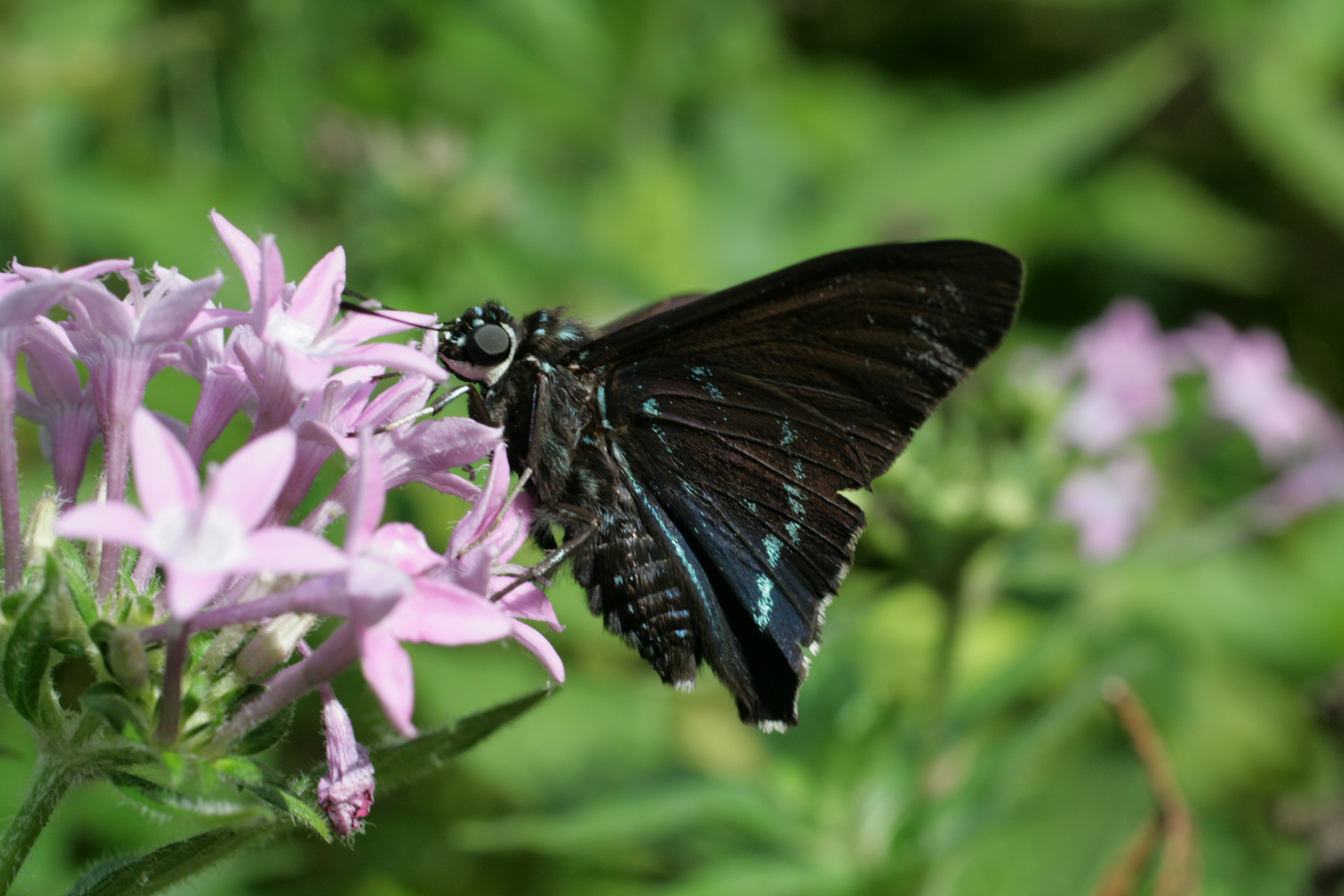

- Phocides pigmalion batabano (Cuba, Cayman)
- Phocides pigmalion batabanoides (Bahamas)
- Phocides pigmalion okeechobee (Florida)
