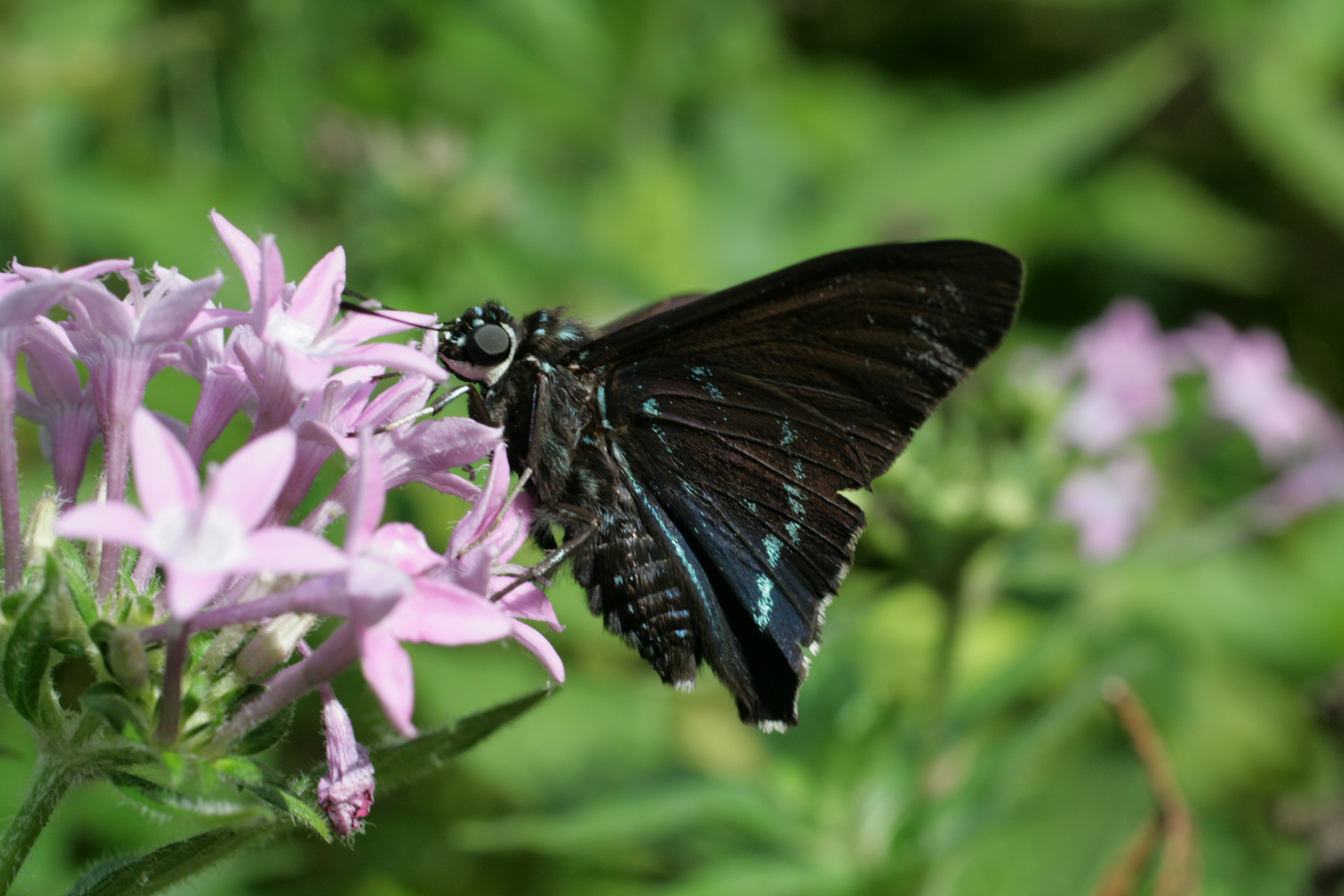
- Phocides pigmalion

Scientific classification
- Kingdom: Animalia
- Phylum: Arthropoda
- Class: Insecta
- Order: Lepidoptera
- Family: Hesperiidae
- Tribe: Phocidini
- Genus: Phocides; Hübner, [1819]

Species
- See text.

Synonyms
- Erycides Hübner, [1819]; Dysenius Scudder, 1872

= Phocides =

Genus of butterflies

Phocides is a genus of butterflies in the skipper family, Hesperiidae, in which it is placed in tribe Phocidini, of which it is the namesake genus.

The distribution of the genus is primarily Neotropical, but a few species occur in the Nearctic.

== Species ==
- Phocides batabano (Lucas, 1857)
  - P. batabano okeechobee (Worthington, 1881) - Florida
  - P. batabano batabanoides (Holland, 1903) - Bahamas
  - P. batabano batabano (Lucas, 1857) - Cuba, Cayman
- Phocides belus Godman & Salvin, [1893] - Mexico
- Phocides bicolora (Boddaert, 1783) - Hispanola
- Phocides charon (C. & R. Felder, 1859) - Brazil, Paraguay
- Phocides distans (Herrich-Schäffer, 1869)
  - P. distans distans - Venezuela
  - P. distans licinus (Möschler, 1879) - Colombia, Panama
  - P. distans silva Evans, 1952 - Peru
- Phocides johnsoni Bell, 1947 - Colombia
- Phocides lincea (Herrich-Schäffer, 1869) - Brazil
- Phocides metrodorus Bell, 1932
  - P. metrodorus metrodorus - Colombia
  - P. metrodorus metron Evans, 1952 - Paraguay
  - P. metrodorus nigrescens Bell, 1938 - Colombia
- Phocides novalis Evans, 1952 - Peru
- Phocides oreides (Hewitson, [1875])
  - P. oreides colombiana Bell, 1938 - Colombia
  - P. oreides oreides (Hewitson, [1875]) - Peru, Bolivia
- Phocides padrona Evans, 1952 - Peru
- Phocides partia Evans, 1952 - Peru
- Phocides perkinsi (Kaye, 1931) - Jamaica
- Phocides perillus (Mabille, 1888) - Colombia
- Phocides petroleum Siewert, Leviski, Mielke & Casagrande, 2018 - Colombia
- Phocides pialia (Hewitson, 1857) - Mexico to Brazil
  - P. pialia pialia - Brazil
  - P. pialia intermedia Mielke, 1992 - Brazil (Minas Gerais)
  - P. pialia maximus (Mabille, 1888) - Brazil
- Phocides pigmalion (Cramer, [1779]) –
  - P. pigmalion pigmalion (Cramer, [1779]) - Central America to Argentina
  - P. pigmalion hewitsonius (Mabille, 1883) - Brazil (Amazonas), Peru, Bolivia
- Phocides polybius (Fabricius, 1793) – guava skipper
  - P. polybius polybius - Suriname, Guyana
  - P. polybius lilea (Reakirt, [1867]) - Texas, Mexico, Central America to Colombia, Brazil
  - P. polybius phanias (Burmeister, 1880) - Argentina, Brazil
- Phocides thermus (Mabille, 1883)
  - P. thermus thermus - Colombia
  - P. thermus valgus (Mabille, 1883) - French Guiana
  - P. thermus bellina Evans, 1952 - Ecuador
- Phocides urania (Westwood, [1852]) - Mexico, Texas
- Phocides vida (Butler, 1872) - Costa Rica, Panama
- Phocides vulcanides Röber, 1925 - Colombia
- Phocides yokhara (Butler, 1870)
  - P. yokhara yokhara - Peru
  - P. yokhara charonotis (Hewitson, 1874) - Bolivia, Peru
  - P. yokhara dryas Le Cerf, 1922 - Peru
  - P. yokhara inca Le Cerf, 1922 - Peru
