= Psidium amplexicaule =

Conservation status
- Least Concern (IUCN 3.1)

Scientific classification
- Kingdom: Plantae
- Clade: Tracheophytes
- Clade: Angiosperms
- Clade: Eudicots
- Clade: Rosids
- Order: Myrtales
- Family: Myrtaceae
- Genus: Psidium
- Species: P. amplexicaule

Binomial name
- Psidium amplexicaule Pers. (1806)

Synonyms
- Calyptrogenia biflora Alain (1976); Eugenia corozalensis Britton (1924); Guajava amplexicaulis (Pers.) Kuntze (1891); Marlierea leal-costae G.M.Barroso & Peixoto (1995); Psidium cordatum Sims (1815); Psidium dictyophyllum Urb. & Ekman (1927); Psidium dumetorum Proctor (1967); Psidium sessilifolium Alain (1973)

Species of plant

Psidium amplexicaule, which is commonly known as mountain guava, is a species in the family Myrtaceae that is native to the Caribbean (Hispaniola, Jamaica, Puerto Rico, and the Leeward Islands) and northeastern Brazil. It is rarely found in a moist limestone forest at 100–600 feet elevation on the north coast of Puerto Rico. This plant can also be found on islands such as St. Thomas and St. John in the United States Virgin Islands and in Tortola and Virgin Gorda of the British Virgin Islands.

== Description ==
Mountain guava is a wild relative of guayaba, commonly known as guava (Psidium guajava). It can be distinguished by opposite and nearly round thick and leathery leaves that are 1½ -2¾ inches in diameter. They are thick/leathery and almost stalkless. Smaller flowers are located at the ends or at the sides of the twigs that are about ½ inch across. Their round fruit is about ¾ inch in diameter, with calyx lobes at their apex. The mountain guava flower color is green and white and blooms in the spring and summertime. The plant is evergreen and can grow in height approximately 2.4 to 3.7 meters (7.9 to 12.1 ft) tall. It was denoted in 1976 as a small tree that is capable of growing to 20 feet tall.
