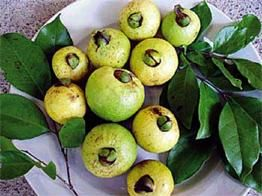

Conservation status
- Least Concern (IUCN 3.1)

Scientific classification
- Kingdom: Plantae
- Clade: Tracheophytes
- Clade: Angiosperms
- Clade: Eudicots
- Clade: Rosids
- Order: Myrtales
- Family: Myrtaceae
- Genus: Psidium
- Species: P. friedrichsthalianum

Binomial name
- Psidium friedrichsthalianum (O.Berg) Nied.

Synonyms
- Calyptropsidium friedrichsthalianum O.Berg; Psidium grandiflorum Ruiz & Pav., nom. illeg. homonym. post.

= Psidium friedrichsthalianum =

Species of fruit and plant

Psidium friedrichsthalianum, the Costa Rican guava or cas, is a species of guava. It is a shrub or tree native to the tropical Americas, ranging from southern Mexico through Central America to Colombia, Venezuela, Ecuador, Peru, Bolivia, and northern Brazil. It grows in lowland tropical moist forest.

This fruit is commonly used to prepare a sour and refreshing drink. It is used as the base for fresco de Cas, in which Costa Ricans mix it with sugar and water and sometimes add cream for a slightly acidic fruit drink.

The species was first described as Calyptropsidium friedrichsthalianum by Otto Karl Berg in 1856. In 1893 Franz Josef Niedenzu placed the species in genus Psidium as P. friedrichsthalianum.
