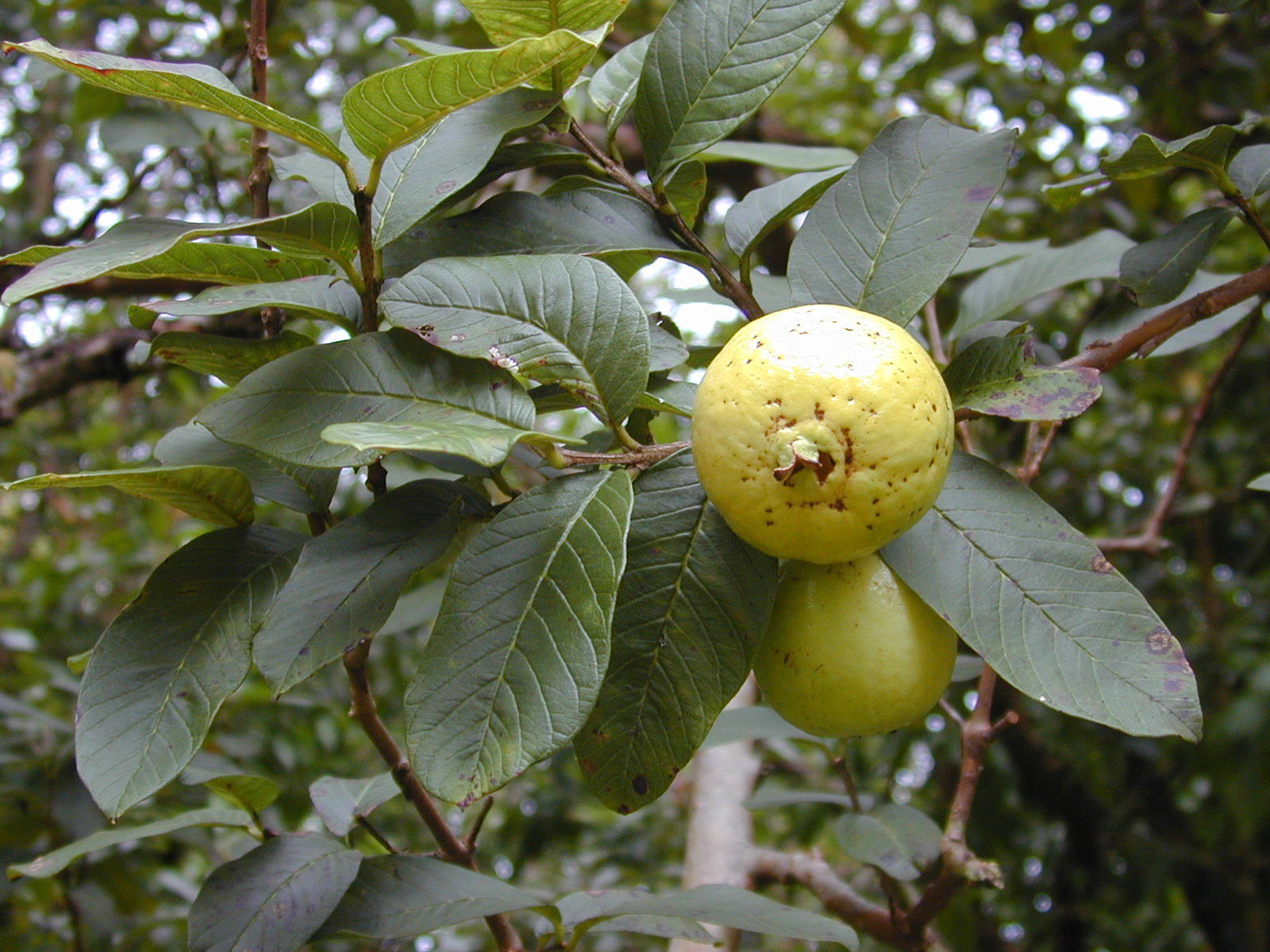
- Guava (Psidium guajava)

Scientific classification
- Kingdom: Plantae
- Clade: Embryophytes
- Clade: Tracheophytes
- Clade: Spermatophytes
- Clade: Angiosperms
- Clade: Eudicots
- Clade: Rosids
- Order: Myrtales
- Family: Myrtaceae
- Subfamily: Myrtoideae
- Tribe: Myrteae
- Genus: Psidium; L.

Species
- See text

Synonyms
- Calyptropsidium O.Berg; Corynemyrtus (Kiaersk.) Mattos; Cuiavus Trew; Episyzygium Suess. & A.Ludw.; Guajava Mill.; Guayaba Noronha; Mitranthes O.Berg; Mitropsidium Burret

= Psidium =

Psidium Temporal range: Paleogene–Recent

Genus of flowering plants in the myrtle family

Psidium is a genus of trees and shrubs in the family Myrtaceae. It is native to warmer parts of the Western Hemisphere (Mexico, Central and South America, the West Indies, and the Galápagos Islands). Many of the species bear edible fruits, and for this reason several are cultivated commercially. The most popularly cultivated species is the common guava, Psidium guajava.

== Taxonomy ==
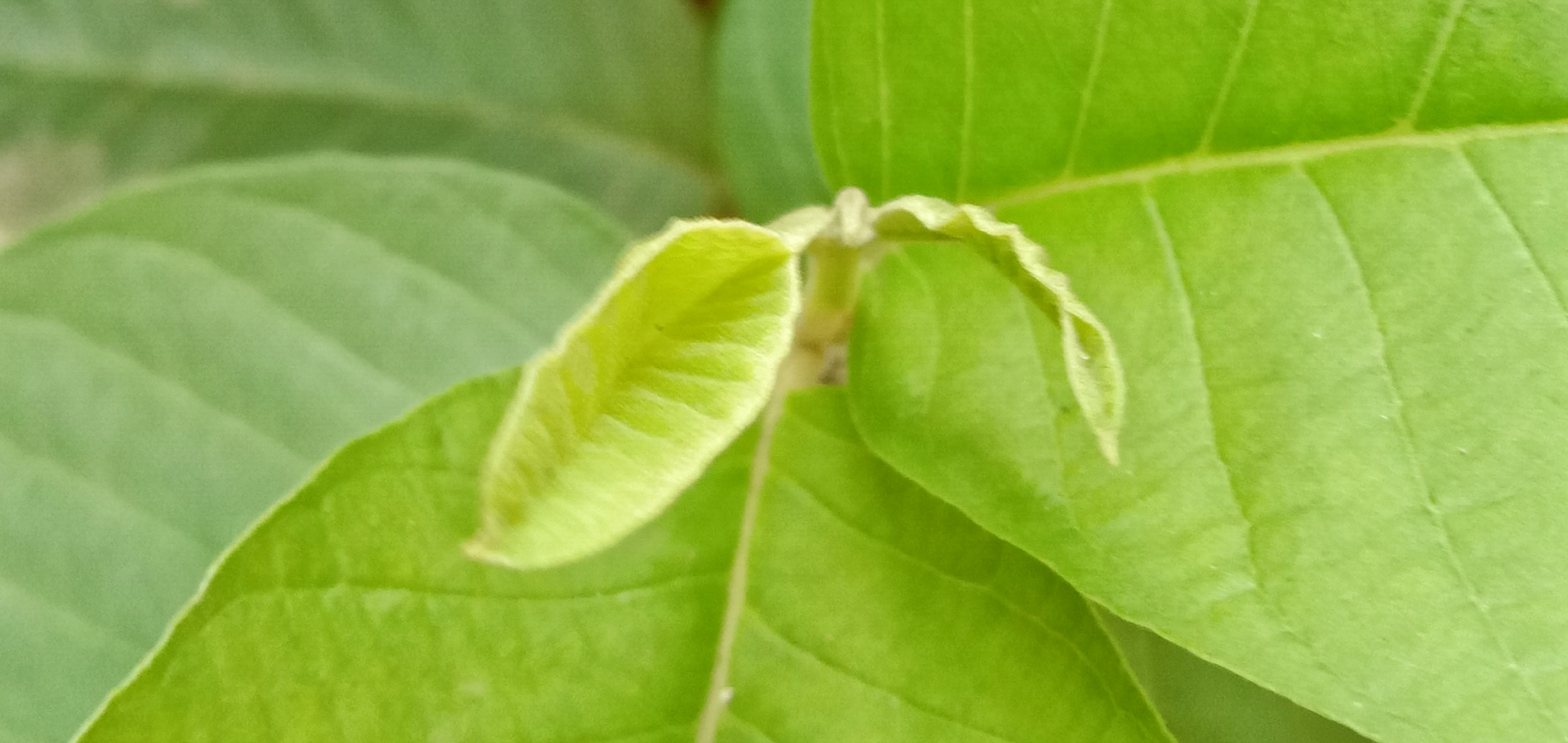
New leaves of Psidium in West Bengal, India

This genus was described first by Linnaeus in 1753.

Fossils are known from the Paleogene of Patagonia.

== Species ==
As of March 2026, Plants of the World Online accepts the following 70 species:

- Psidium acidum (Mart. ex DC.) Landrum
- Psidium acranthum Urb.
- Psidium acutangulum DC.
- Psidium albescens Urb.
- Psidium amplexicaule Pers.
- Psidium appendiculatum Kiaersk.
- Psidium araucanum Soares-Silva & Proença
- Psidium australe Cambess.
- Psidium bahianum Landrum & Funch
- Psidium brevipedunculatum Tuler & Landrum
- Psidium brownianum Mart. ex DC.
- Psidium cattleyanum Sabine
- Psidium cauliflorum Landrum & Sobral
- Psidium decussatum DC.
- Psidium densicomum Mart. ex DC.
- Psidium firmum O.Berg
- Psidium friedrichsthalianum (O.Berg) Nied.
- Psidium fulvum McVaugh
- Psidium ganevii Landrum & Funch
- Psidium glaziovianum Kiaersk.
- Psidium grandifolium Mart. ex DC.
- Psidium grazielae Tuler & M.C.Souza
- Psidium guajava L.
- Psidium guayaquilense Landrum & Cornejo
- Psidium guineense Sw.
- Psidium guyanense Pers.
- Psidium harrisianum Urb.
- Psidium huanucoense Landrum
- Psidium inaequilaterum O.Berg
- Psidium itanareense O.Berg
- Psidium jacquinianum (O.Berg) Mattos
- Psidium kennedyanum Morong
- Psidium langsdorffii O.Berg
- Psidium laruotteanum Cambess.
- Psidium longipetiolatum D.Legrand
- Psidium maribense Mart. ex DC.
- Psidium minutifolium Krug & Urb.
- Psidium misionum D.Legrand
- Psidium montanum Sw.
- Psidium myrsinites DC.
- Psidium myrtoides O.Berg
- Psidium nannophyllum Alain
- Psidium nummularia (C.Wright ex Griseb.) C.Wright
- Psidium nutans O.Berg
- Psidium oblongatum O.Berg
- Psidium occidentale Landrum & Parra-Os.
- Psidium oligospermum Mart. ex DC.
- Psidium ovale (Spreng.) Burret
- Psidium parvifolium Griseb.
- Psidium pedicellatum McVaugh
- Psidium pigmeum Arruda
- Psidium pulcherrimum Tuler & C.M.Costa
- Psidium raimondii Burret
- Psidium ratterianum Proença & Soares-Silva
- Psidium rhombeum O.Berg
- Psidium riparium Mart. ex DC.
- Psidium robustum O.Berg
- Psidium rostratum McVaugh
- Psidium rotundatum Griseb.
- Psidium rotundidiscum Proença & Tuler
- Psidium rufum Mart. ex DC.
- Psidium rutidocarpum Ruiz & Pav. ex G.Don
- Psidium salutare (Kunth) O.Berg
- Psidium schenckianum Kiaersk.
- Psidium sessiliflorum (Landrum) Proença & Tuler
- Psidium sobralianum Landrum & Proença
- Psidium sorocabense O.Berg
- Psidium striatulum DC.
- Psidium suffruticosum O.Berg
- Psidium urquiolanum Landrum & Z.Acosta
