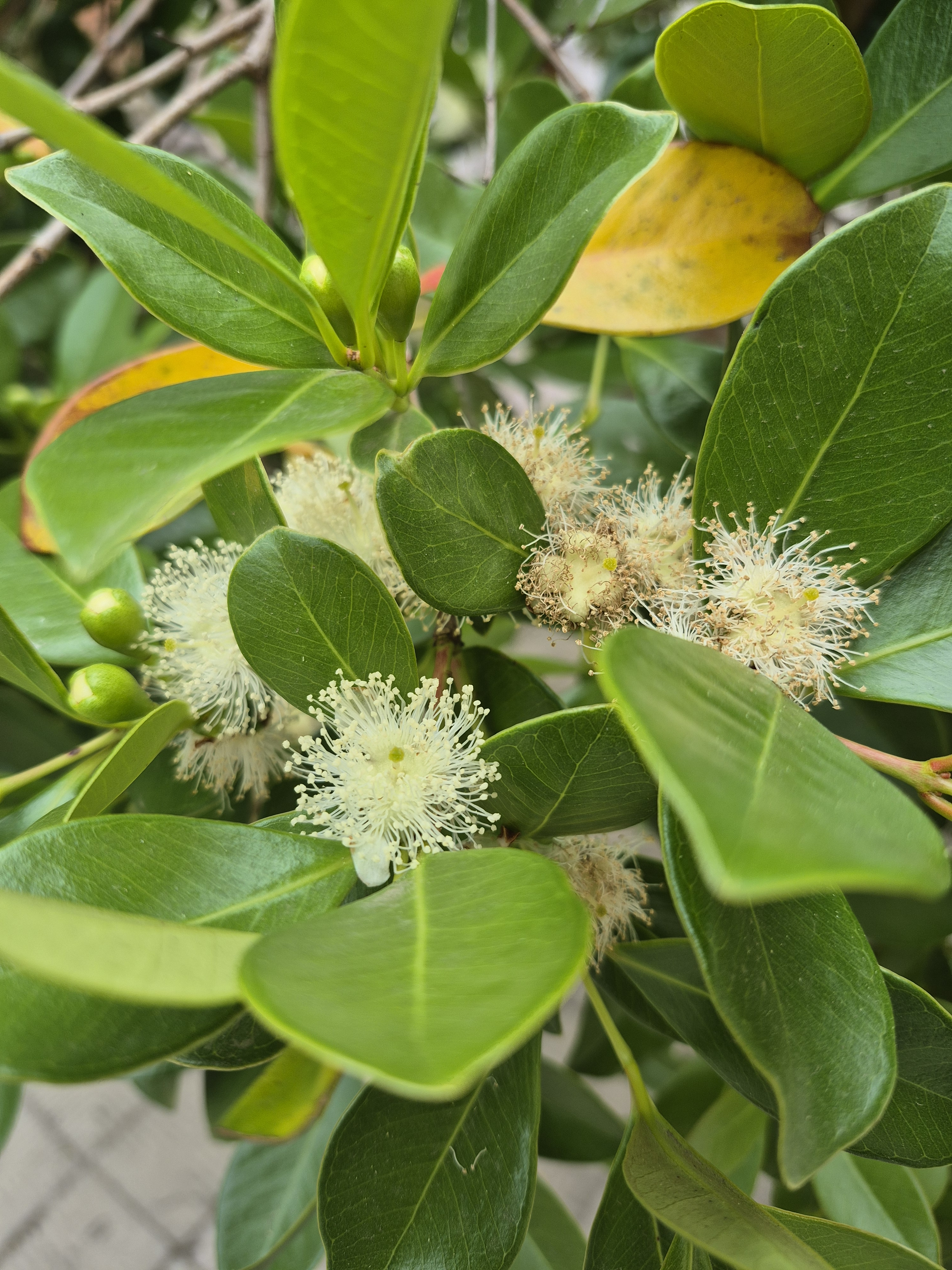
- Flowers
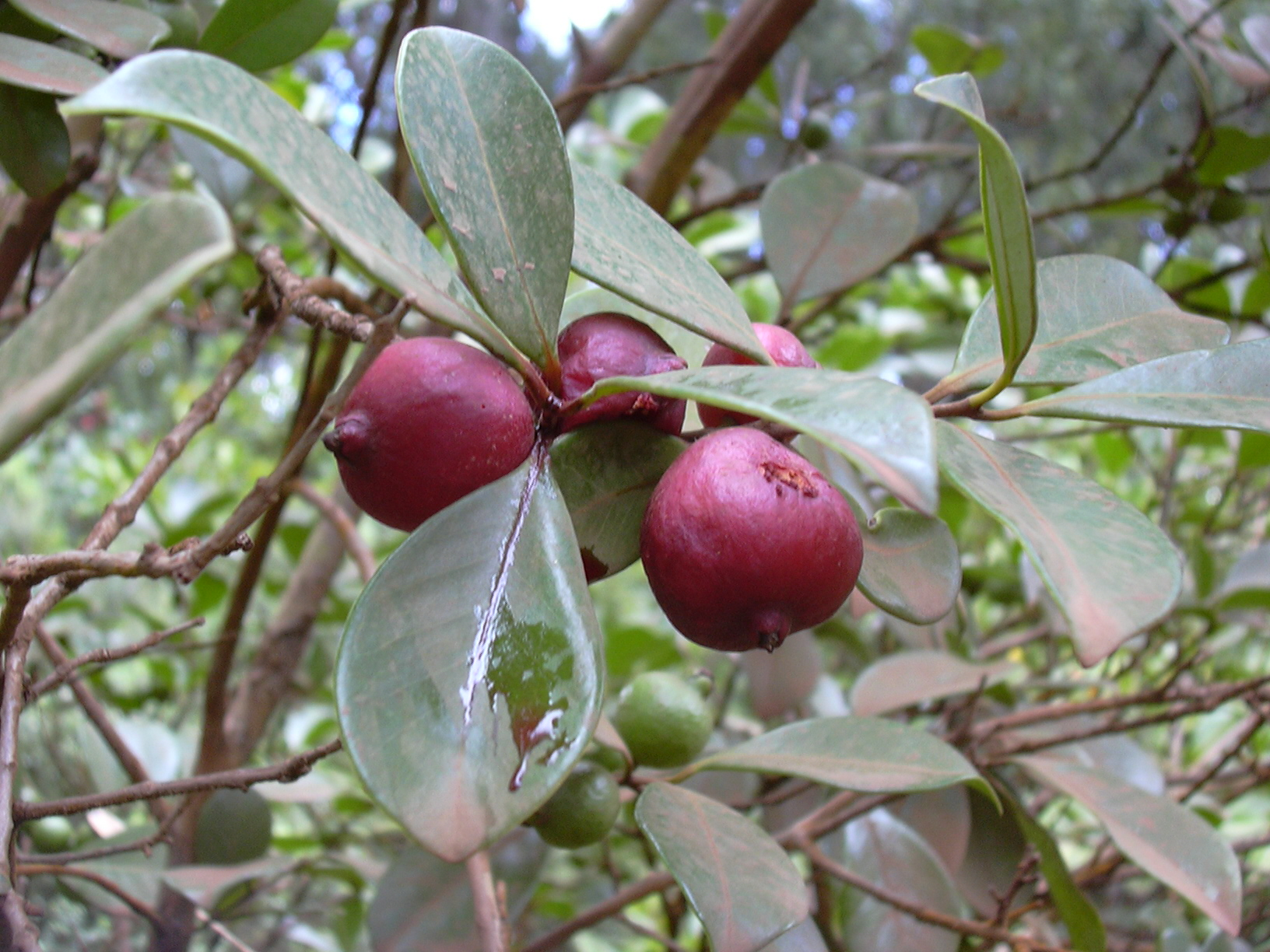
- red cattley guava

Scientific classification
- Kingdom: Plantae
- Clade: Tracheophytes
- Clade: Angiosperms
- Clade: Eudicots
- Clade: Rosids
- Order: Myrtales
- Family: Myrtaceae
- Genus: Psidium
- Species: P. cattleyanum

Binomial name
- Psidium cattleyanum Sabine

Synonyms
- Episyzygium oahuense Suess. & A.Ludw.; Eugenia ferruginea Sieber ex C.Presl; Eugenia oxygona Koidz.; Eugenia pseudovenosa H.Perrier; Eugenia urceolata Cordem.; Guajava cattleiana (Afzel. ex Sabine) Kuntze; Guajava obovata (Mart. ex DC.) Kuntze; Psidium ferrugineum C.Presl; Psidium indicum Bojer nom. inval.; Psidium littorale Raddi; Psidium obovatum Mart. ex DC.; Psidium variabile O.Berg

= Psidium cattleyanum =

Species of tree

Psidium cattleyanum (World Plants: Psidium cattleianum), commonly known as Cattley guava, strawberry guava or cherry guava, is a small tree (2–6 m (6 ft 7 in – 19 ft 8 in) tall) in the Myrtaceae (myrtle) family. The species is named in honour of English horticulturist William Cattley. The red-fruited variety, P. cattleyanum var. cattleyanum, is commonly known as purple guava, red cattley guava, red strawberry guava and red cherry guava. The yellow-fruited variety, P. cattleyanum var. littorale is variously known as yellow cattley guava, yellow strawberry guava, yellow cherry guava, lemon guava and in Hawaii as waiawī.

It is an invasive plant in many areas and is considered the most invasive species in Hawaii, although it has some economic uses, including its edible fruit.

== Description ==
Psidium cattleyanum is a small, highly branched tree that reaches a maximum height of 13 m (43 ft), although most individuals are between 2 and 4 m (6 ft 7 in – 13 ft 1 in). It has smooth, grey to reddish-brown bark, with oval to elliptical leaves that grow to 4.5 cm in length. It bears fruit when the plants are between 3 and 6 years old. This fruit has thin skin that ranges from yellow to a dark red or purple, is ovular in shape, and grows to around 4 cm in length. Its flowers grow either individually or in clusters of three, and each flower has five petals.

P. cattleyanum reproduces through setting seed and through cloning. Clonally produced suckers tend to have a greater leaf area.

P. cattleyanum is in the USDA hardiness zones 9a–11.

== Etymology ==
The genus name, Psidium, comes from the Latin psidion ('armlet').

== Distribution ==
Though native to Brazil, it is now distributed throughout many tropical regions. It was introduced in Hawaii as early as 1825 to create an agricultural market for its fruits, but it has yet to be a commercially viable product. It is now highly prevalent in tropical rainforest ecosystems due mainly to accidental transportation and its invasive plant properties.

== Ecology ==
P. cattleyanum occurs primarily in mesic tropical rainforest environments at an elevation of up to 1,300 m (4,300 ft), but is found primarily below 800 m (2,600 ft). Its native range is restricted to the Amazonian Basin in Brazil, but it has established in many other tropical areas of similar characteristics.

P. cattleyanum does not dominate plant communities in its native range. It is considered invasive due to its robust tolerance to many different environments. P. cattleyanum is prevalent in both undisturbed and highly disturbed roadside habitats in its invasive range. Its invasive quality may be explained by a high amount of genetic variation, as variants of different fruit colors cluster at different elevations. Additionally, P. cattleyanum is both very shade-tolerant and able to withstand soils with a moderate to high pH level. It is also capable of withstanding heavy leaf litter and responding to bending or breaking of its branches by generating vigorous shoots.

P. cattleyanum is often associated with invasive feral pigs The two species are often found near each other, most likely because feral pigs aid in the spread of P. cattleyanum. The pigs disturb habitats by digging in the soil, making it easier for P. cattleyanum seeds to reach the soil. Additionally, feral pigs may ingest the fruits, whose seeds reach the soil in the scat of the feral pigs.

Preliminary research suggests that P. cattleyanum is allelopathic, as its roots have been found to inhibit the growth of at least two other plant species when soil pH was not a factor.

=== As an invasive species ===
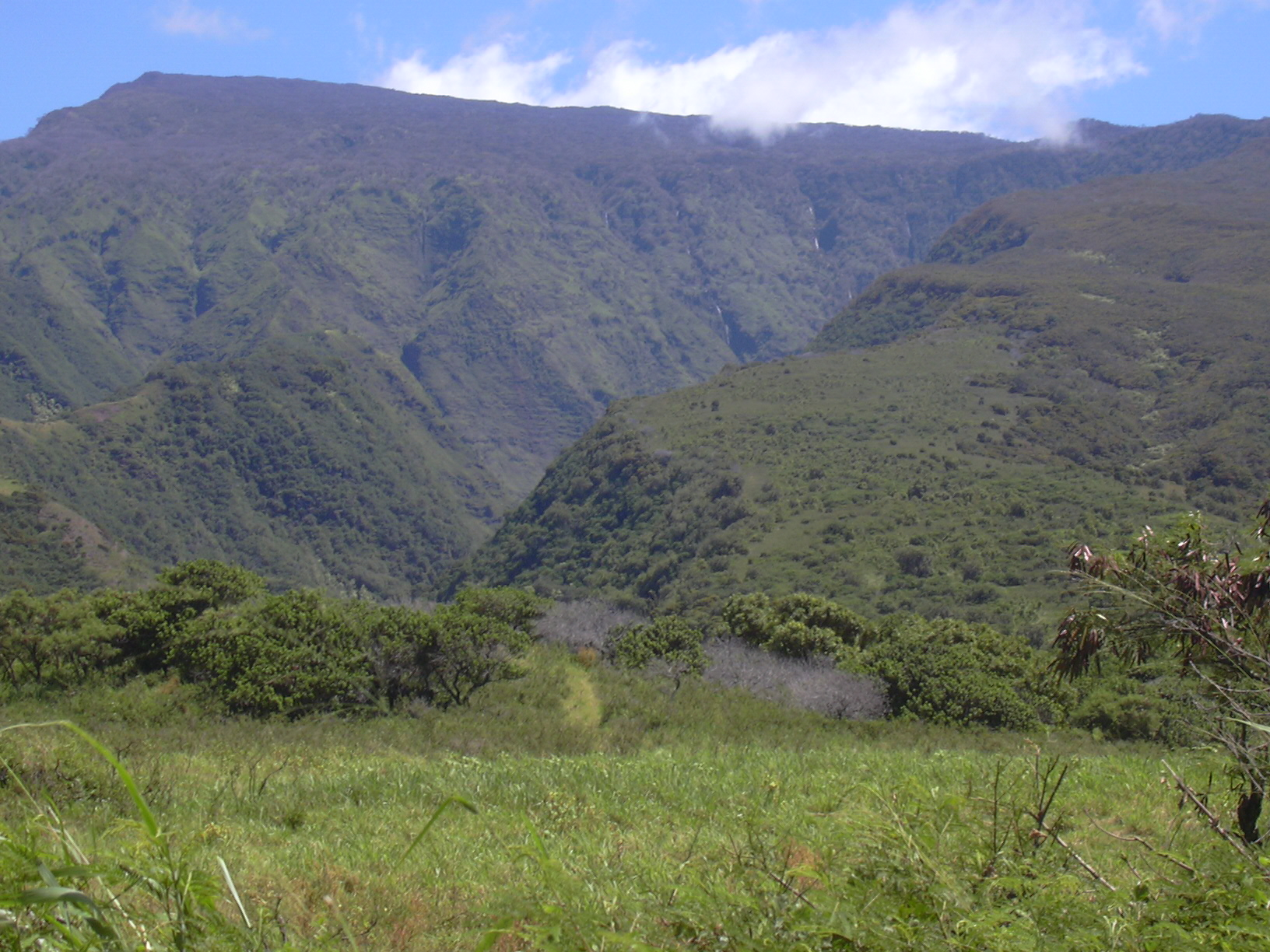
Invasive growth in Hawaii

Native to Brazil—where it is known as araçá—and adjacent tropical South America, P. cattleyanum is closely related to common guava (P. guajava). Like that species, it is a widespread, highly invasive species in tropical areas throughout the Indian and Pacific Oceans.

It was introduced to many of the areas it now invades due to human usage as a crop for its edible fruit. It is considered the most invasive plant in Hawaii. It is also among the most invasive species on Réunion and Madagascar, where it poses a significant threat to the endemic forests. It has also spread to the Azores, though it is not as invasive there. It is sporadically naturalised in coastal areas of Queensland and northern New South Wales. It is also naturalised on Lord Howe Island, Norfolk Island and Christmas Island (Navie 2004; Queensland Herbarium 2008).

The species is able to propagate quickly due to the spread of its fruit and seeds, which is facilitated by birds and feral pigs, as well as through its root sprouts. The yellow variety bears more heavily than the red and generally has larger fruit. It tends to form dense, monotypic thickets that block sunlight and prevent the growth of native species, and is very difficult to eradicate. It also provides refuge for fruit flies, which cause extensive agricultural damage.

P. cattleyanum grows effectively in undisturbed areas, complicating restoration efforts in sensitive habitats. Its presence in damaged ecosystems further complicates management due to its high dispersal from these less-sensitive habitats to more fragile habitats. Its ability to thrive in a variety of different habitats under many different ecological conditions threatens native flora of many different habitat types. Additionally, its potential allelopathic qualities further complicate the ability of other plant species to coexist.

==== Control strategies ====
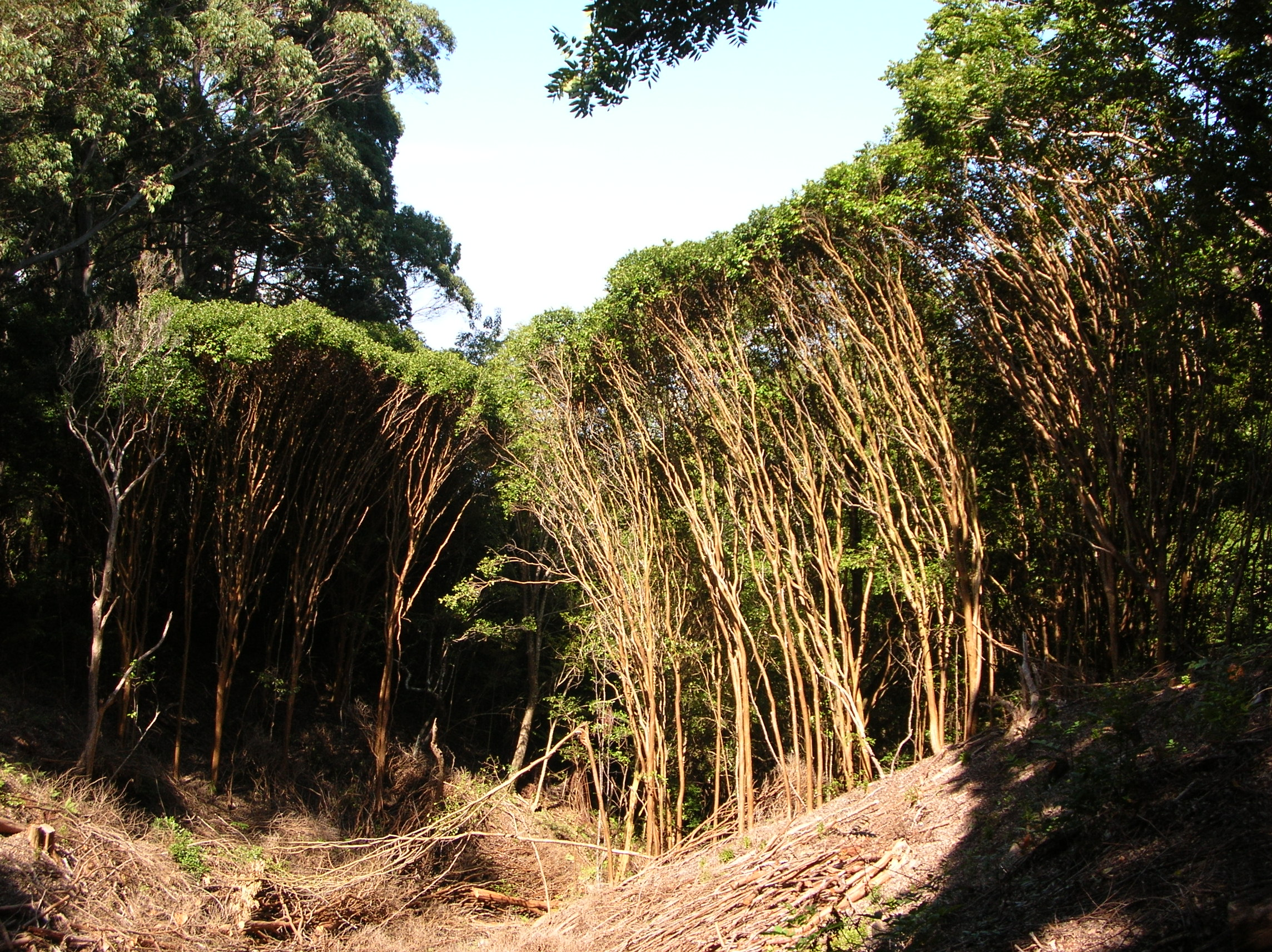
Dense thicket growth in Hawaii forests

A variety of management strategies have been applied to P. cattleyanum management efforts due to its ubiquity and the various ways it spreads. Despite the great threat that P. cattleyanum poses to many tropical ecosystems, some studies indicate that isolated groups can be totally eradicated after three to four years of proper management applications, such as cutting and burning mature individuals and applying herbicide to stumps. However, continued follow-up management is necessary indefinitely after a period of high-intensity restoration. This management strategy, known as the “special ecological areas,” is one of the strongest ways of controlling plant species over time. It works by focusing wood removal, burning, and other management efforts in the designated efforts.

Feral pigs and non-native birds contribute to the spread of P. cattleyanum via seed dispersal. Thus, some control efforts involve removal and control of invasive fauna. However, results from such efforts are often unsuccessful due to the lack of dependence upon the animals for dispersal, as germination occurs under a wide variety of conditions.

Another management technique is the introduction of insects that act as parasites on the invasive plants. This biological control approach is used because certain insects cause damage to P. cattleyanum in a way that either prevents the tree from reproducing or kills them outright. Most of the proposed insects infect the tree with bud or leaf galls, effectively preventing fruit growth or photosynthesis. For example, Dasineura gigantea caused bud galls that inhibited shoot growth. The Brazilian Scale is a potential biological control agent used in Florida, and Hawaii. However, some insects cannot be used due to the potential for certain species to attack more than P. cattleyanum. One such species, the sawfly (Haplostegus epimelas), attacked commercially produced guava plants in addition to invasive P. cattleyanum.

== Uses ==
Both the fruit's thin skin and juicy interior are soft and edible. It can also be used to make jam and juices. The skin is often removed for a sweeter flavour. The seeds are small and white in colour. Its leaves may be brewed for tea. The wood of the tree is hard, compact, durable, and resistant, and is used for lathe work, tool handles, charcoal, and firewood. The plant is indispensable for mixed planting in reforestation of reclaimed and protected areas in Brazil.

P. cattleyanum has modest economic impacts in Hawaii due to its edible fruits. However, products made from P. cattleyanum are not commercially available because of a lack of market and the heavy presence of fruit flies. This renders the fruits inedible soon after they are picked. Its seeds have many health benefits, including antioxidant, anti-inflammatory, and antimicrobial properties in addition to a high amount of vitamin C.

Necklaces are reported to be handcrafted in Tanzania by tying together beads made of individual fruits.

== Gallery ==
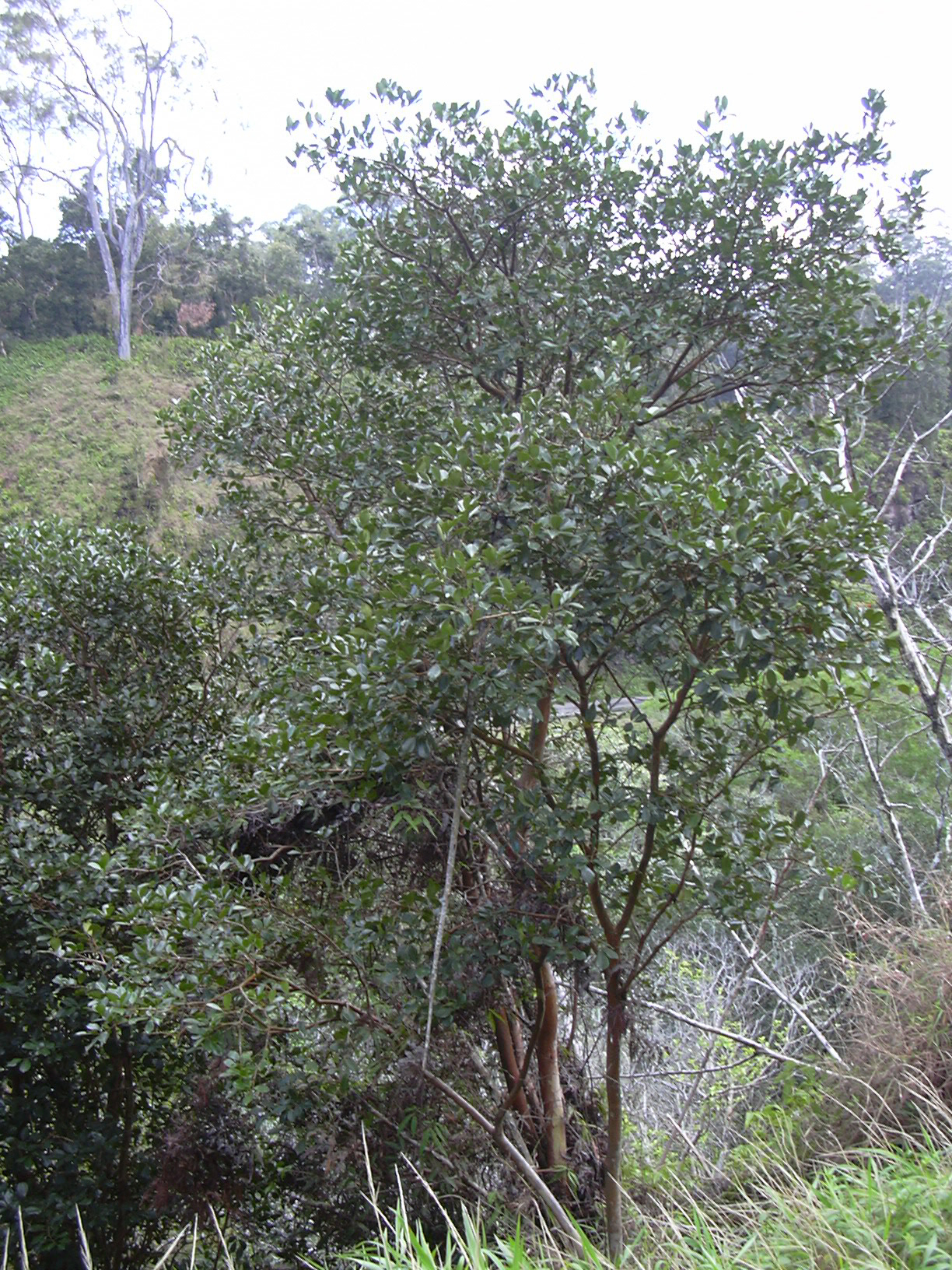
Tree

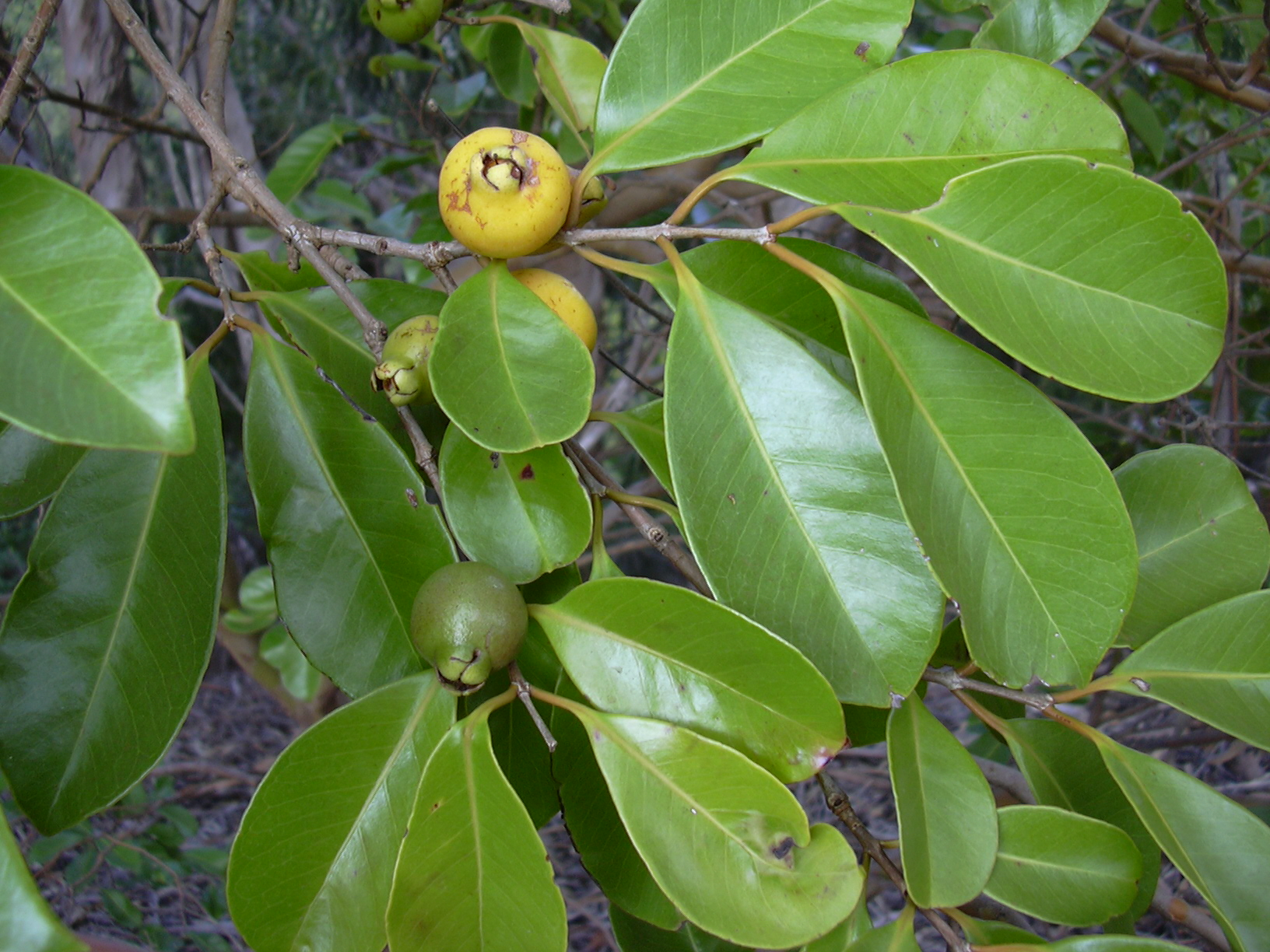
Foliage

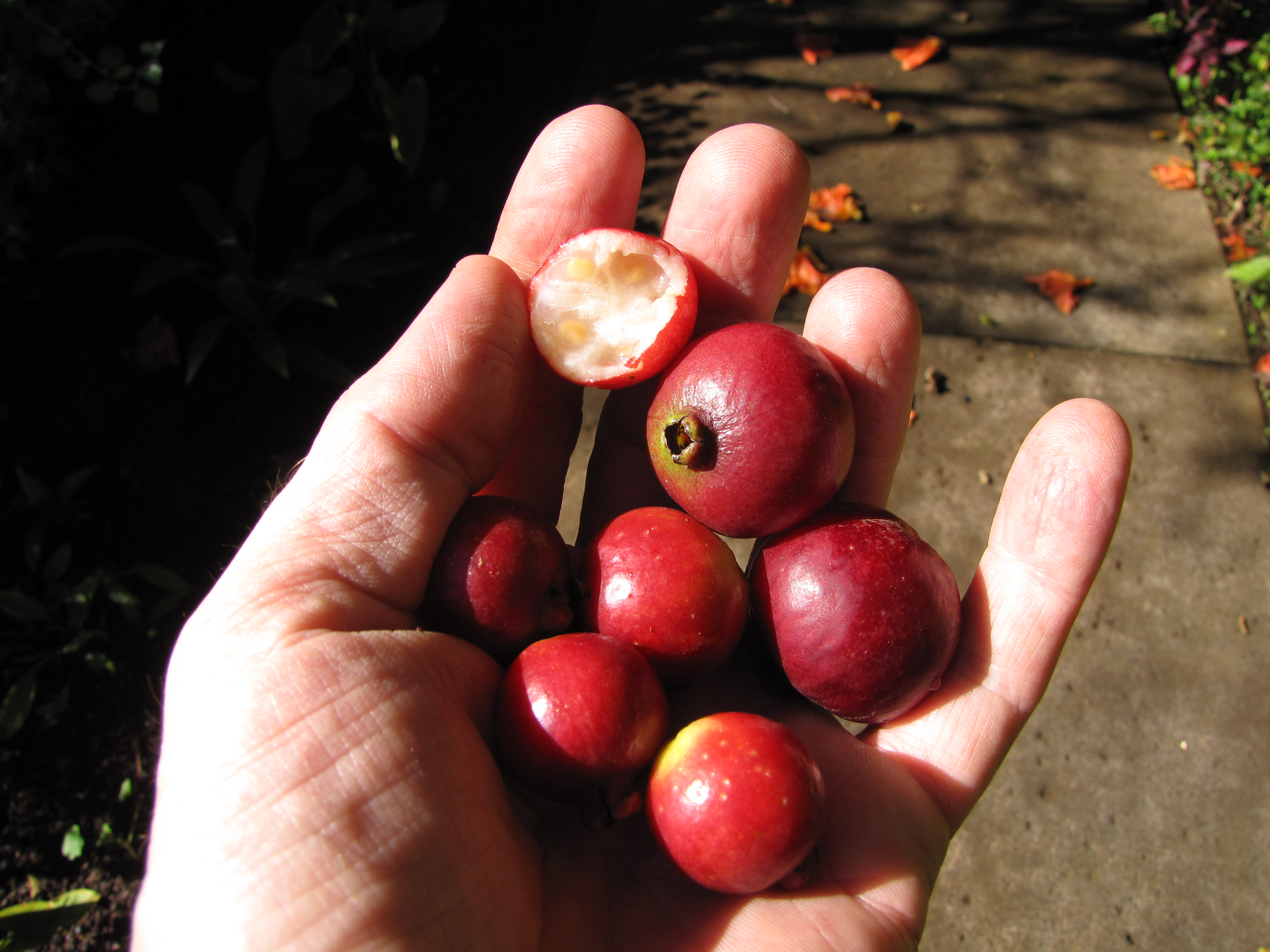
Fruit

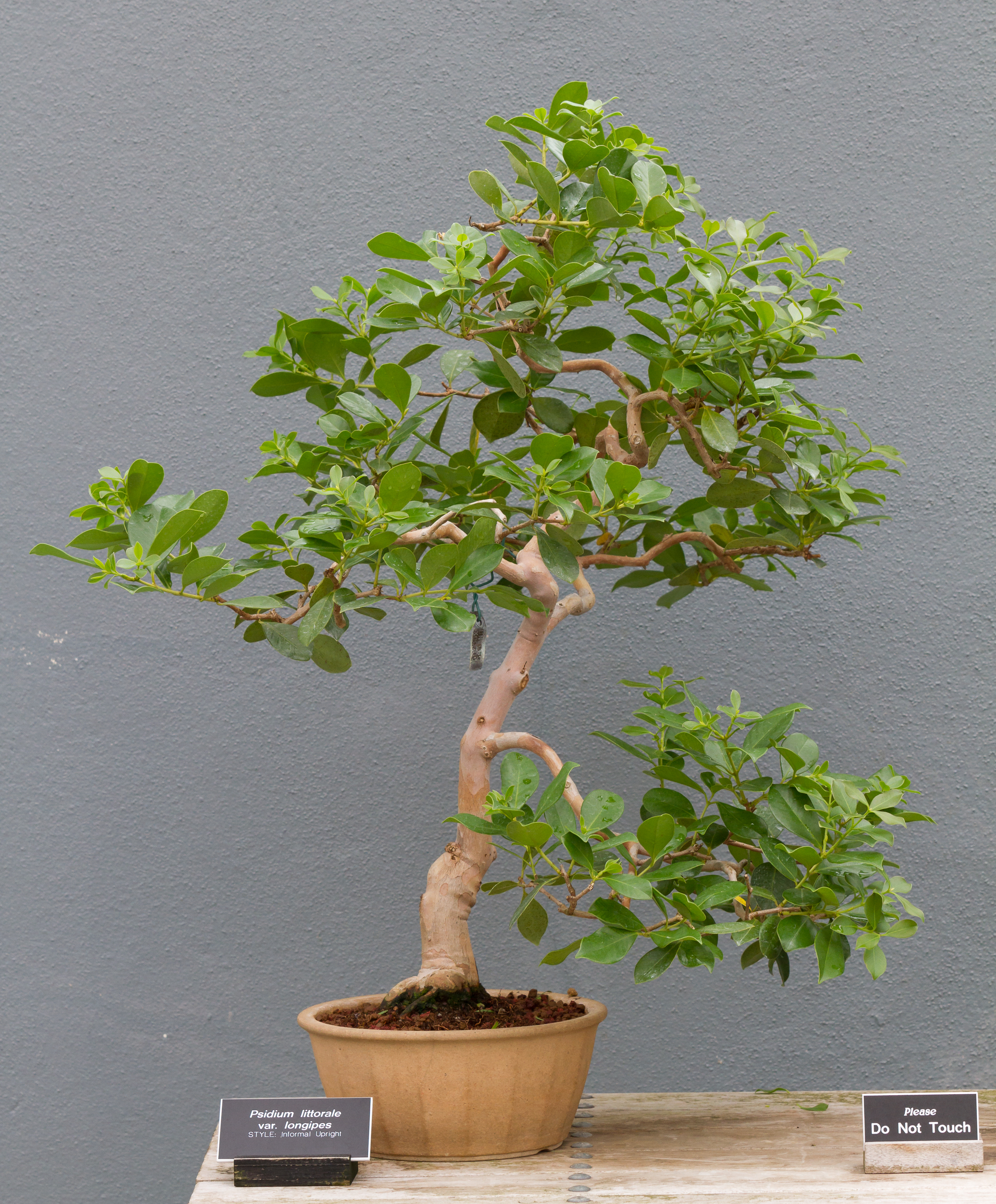
As bonsai

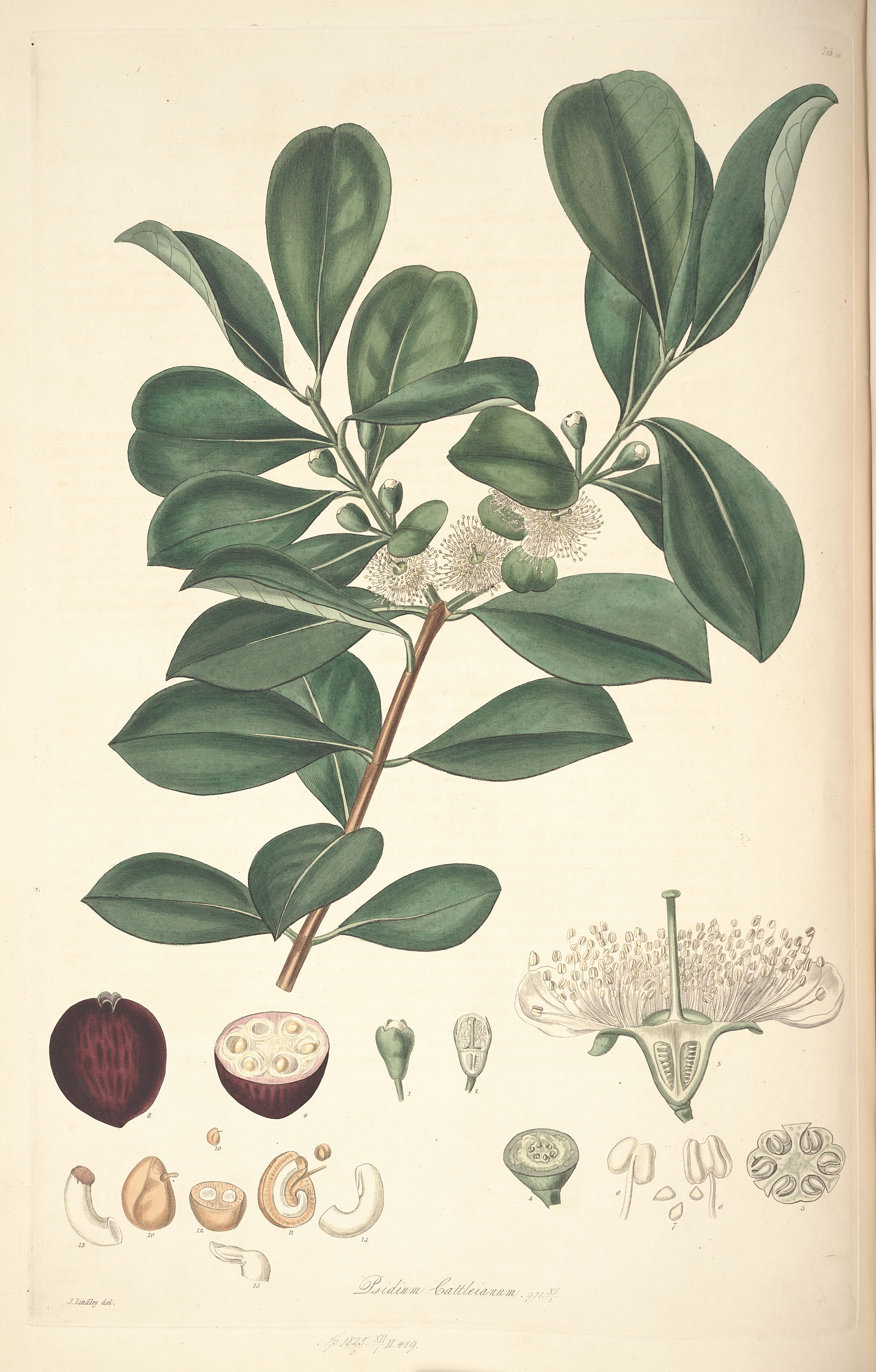
Illustration, John Lindley

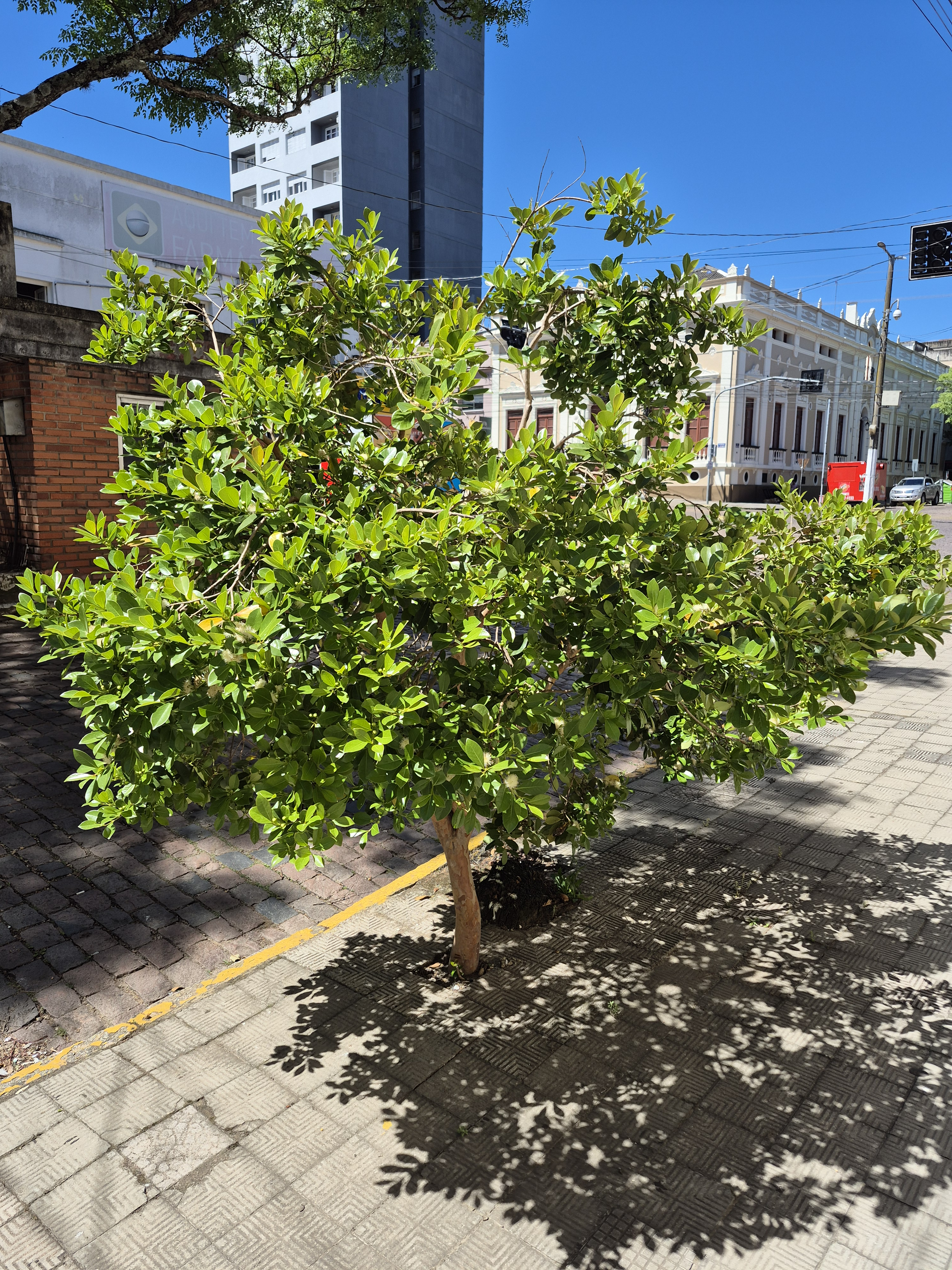
Tree in Bagé, Brazil

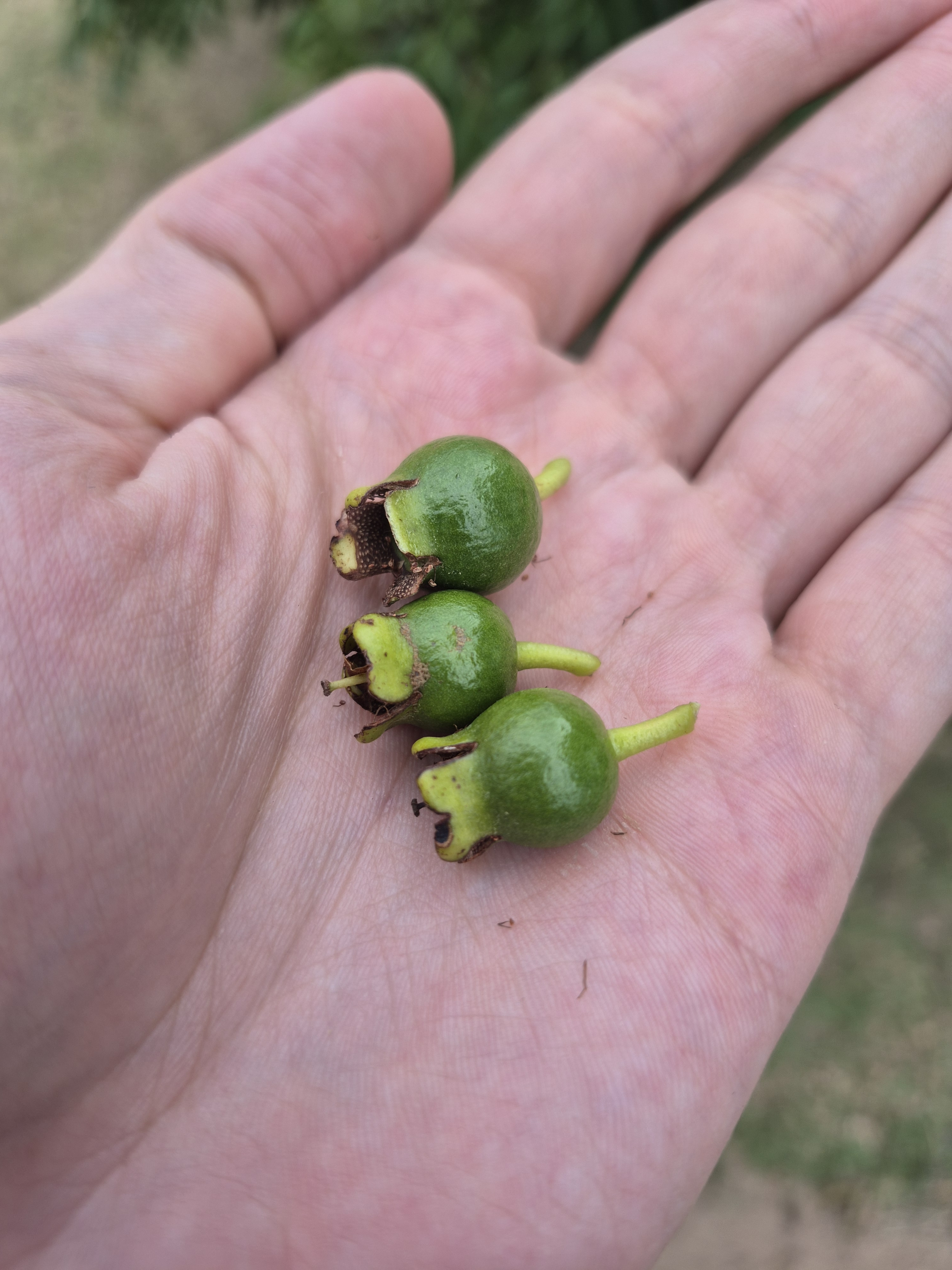
Unripe fruit
