= Cambuí =

Cambuí may refer to:

- Cambuí, Minas Gerais, a municipality in the state of Minas Gerais, Brazil
- Cambuím (disambiguation) or Cambuí, the common name for a number of species of plant in the family Myrtaceae
  - Myrciaria cuspidata
  - Myrciaria delicatula
  - Myrciaria plinioides
  - Myrciaria tenella
