= Myrciaria alta =

Scientific classification
- Kingdom: Plantae
- Clade: Embryophytes
- Clade: Tracheophytes
- Clade: Spermatophytes
- Clade: Angiosperms
- Clade: Eudicots
- Clade: Rosids
- Order: Myrtales
- Family: Myrtaceae
- Genus: Myrciaria
- Species: M. alta

Binomial name
- Myrciaria alta T.B.Flores & Sobral

Species of plant in the myrtle family

Myrciaria alta is a species of plant in the family Myrtaceae, endemic to Espírito Santo, Brazil. It was first described in 2019 and it is closely related to Myrciaria glomerata.

== Description ==
Myrciaria alta is similar in form, structure and appearance to Myrciaria glomerata and Myrciaria strigipes but can reach a much greater height, between 12 and 17 metres (39 and 56 ft) tall. The leaves are 60–93 mm (2.4–3.7 in) long, and it produces flowers, and 20–30 mm (0.8–1.2 in) fruits, on its older woody branches.

== Distribution ==
Myrciaria alta is endemic to the montane region of Santa Teresa, Espírito Santo, in Brazil, at elevations of around 850 m (2,790 ft).

== Etymology ==
The species name comes from the Latin altum, meaning high, and referring to its maximum height compared with Myrciaria glomerata.

== Conservation status ==
Myrciaria alta is only known from three samples. Its extent of occurrence is 0.281 square kilometres (0.108 sq mi) and its habitat is threatened by urban development. The species may be critically endangered.
