= Myrciaria guaquiea =

Conservation status
- Least Concern (IUCN 3.1)

Scientific classification
- Kingdom: Plantae
- Clade: Embryophytes
- Clade: Tracheophytes
- Clade: Spermatophytes
- Clade: Angiosperms
- Clade: Eudicots
- Clade: Rosids
- Order: Myrtales
- Family: Myrtaceae
- Genus: Myrciaria
- Species: M. guaquiea

Binomial name
- Myrciaria guaquiea (Kiaersk.) Mattos & D.Legrand

Synonyms
- Eugenia guaquiea Kiaersk.; Paramyrciaria guaquiea (Kiaersk.) Sobral

Species of plant in the myrtle family

Myrciaria guaquiea, commonly known as guaquica or ibá-cuíca, is a species of plant in the family Myrtaceae. It is an evergreen shrub or small tree, endemic to the east of Brazil. The plant grows up to between 4 and 7 metres (13 and 23 ft) tall, and produces edible yellow fruits between 20 and 25 mm (0.8 and 1.0 in) in diameter. Consumed raw, the fruit has been described as tasting similar to Myrciaria glazioviana.
