= Myrciaria cambuca =

Scientific classification
- Kingdom: Plantae
- Clade: Embryophytes
- Clade: Tracheophytes
- Clade: Spermatophytes
- Clade: Angiosperms
- Clade: Eudicots
- Clade: Rosids
- Order: Myrtales
- Family: Myrtaceae
- Genus: Myrciaria
- Species: M. cambuca

Binomial name
- Myrciaria cambuca Costa-Lima & E.C.O.Chagas

Species of plant in the myrtle family

Myrciaria cambuca, named after its common name cambucá, is a species of plant in the family Myrtaceae. First described in 2019, it is a small shrub with reddish fruit, and was previously misidentified as Myrciaria ferruginea.

== Description ==
Myrciaria cambuca is a small shrub that reaches up to 3 m (9.8 ft) tall. Its leaves are opposite, between 1.1 and 3.5 cm (0.4 and 1.4 in) long and between 0.6 and 1.5 cm (0.2 and 0.6 in) wide. The plant produces reddish fruit up to 15 mm (0.6 in) in diameter, with up to two seeds.

== Distribution ==
Myrciaria cambuca is endemic to the subcanopy of the atlantic coastal forest of eastern Brazil, between the states of Paraíba and Espírito Santo.

== Conservation status ==
It has been proposed that Myrciaria cambuca is endangered, due to farming, urbanisation and the invasion of alien species into its habitat.
