= Myrciaria una =

Scientific classification
- Kingdom: Plantae
- Clade: Embryophytes
- Clade: Tracheophytes
- Clade: Spermatophytes
- Clade: Angiosperms
- Clade: Eudicots
- Clade: Rosids
- Order: Myrtales
- Family: Myrtaceae
- Genus: Myrciaria
- Species: M. una

Binomial name
- Myrciaria una Costa-Lima & E.C.O.Chagas

Species of plant in the myrtle family

Myrciaria una is a species of plant in the family Myrtaceae. First described in 2019, it is a tree or treelet with blackish fruit, and was previously misidentified as Myrciaria ferruginea.

== Etymology ==
From una, the Tupi word for black, referring to the colour of the fruit.

== Description ==
Myrciaria una is a tree that reaches between 4 and 7 m (13 and 23 ft) tall. Its leaves are opposite, between 3.5 and 11.5 cm (1.4 and 4.5 in) long and between 1.3 and 5.1 cm (0.5 and 2.0 in) wide. The plant produces purplish to blackish fruit up to 20 mm (0.8 in) in diameter, with up to two seeds.

== Distribution ==
Myrciaria una is endemic to the subcanopy of the atlantic coastal forest in the states of Ceará, Pernambuco, Alagoas and Bahia in north-eastern Brazil.

== Conservation status ==
It has been proposed that Myrciaria una is endangered, due to farming, urban expansion, and the historical fragmentation of the Atlantic coastal rainforest in north-eastern Brazil.
