= Myrciaria alagoana =

Conservation status
- Endangered (IUCN 3.1)

Scientific classification
- Kingdom: Plantae
- Clade: Tracheophytes
- Clade: Angiosperms
- Clade: Eudicots
- Clade: Rosids
- Order: Myrtales
- Family: Myrtaceae
- Genus: Myrciaria
- Species: M. alagoana

Binomial name
- Myrciaria alagoana Sobral

Species of plant in the myrtle family

Myrciaria alagoana is a species of plant in the family Myrtaceae and is endemic to the state of Alagoas in the east of Brazil. Myrciaria alagoana was first described in 2012 and is related to Myrciaria glomerata.
