= Myrciaria tenella =

Scientific classification
- Kingdom: Plantae
- Clade: Embryophytes
- Clade: Tracheophytes
- Clade: Spermatophytes
- Clade: Angiosperms
- Clade: Eudicots
- Clade: Rosids
- Order: Myrtales
- Family: Myrtaceae
- Genus: Myrciaria
- Species: M. tenella

Binomial name
- Myrciaria tenella (DC.) O.Berg

Synonyms
- Eugenia tenella DC.; Eugenia tenella var. elliptica Kiaersk.; Eugenia tenella var. glazioviana Kiaersk.; Eugenia tenella var. macrocarpa Kiaersk.; Eugenia tenella var. minor Cambess.; Eugenia tenella var. spathulata Kiaersk.; Myrciaria tenella var. elliptica O.Berg; Myrciaria tenella var. glazioviana Kiaersk.; Myrciaria tenella var. macrocalyx Kiaersk.; Myrciaria tenella var. minor (Cambess.) O. Berg; Myrciaria tenella var. spathulata O.Berg; Myrciaria undulata O.Berg; Plinia haitiensis Urb. & Ekman; Plinia montecristina Urb. & Ekman

Species of plant in the myrtle family

Myrciaria tenella, commonly known as cambuí or camboim, which are also used to describe Myrciaria cuspidata and Myrciaria delicatula; or more specifically jabuticaba-macia, and cambuí-açu, is a species of plant in the family Myrtaceae.

== Distribution ==
Myrciaria tenella is endemic to Argentina, Bolivia, Brazil, Dominican Republic, French Guiana, Haiti, Paraguay, Peru, Uruguay, and Venezuela.

== Description ==
Myrciaria tenella is a semi-deciduous shrub or small tree that grows to between 1 and 6 metres (3.3 and 20 ft) tall. The red or orange fruit is edible and up to 15 mm (0.59 in) in diameter. Each fruit contains one, or sometimes two seeds.

== Uses ==
Cambuí fruit is an important species in the State of Sergipe, Brazil, where the fruits are harvested and sold for fresh consumption in the local market. The fruits are also used to make juice, jelly and wine.
