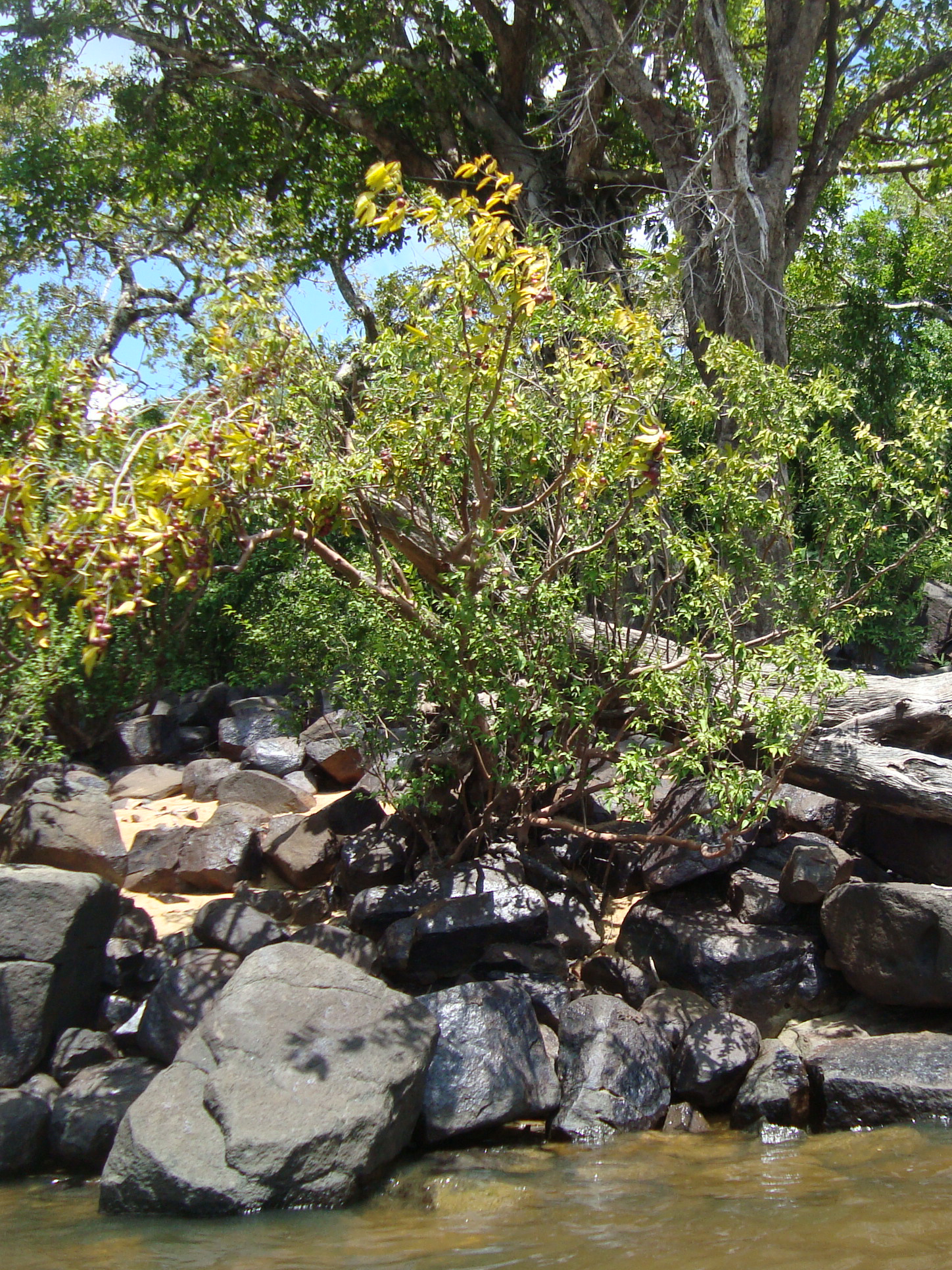

Conservation status
- Least Concern (IUCN 3.1)

Scientific classification
- Kingdom: Plantae
- Clade: Embryophytes
- Clade: Tracheophytes
- Clade: Spermatophytes
- Clade: Angiosperms
- Clade: Eudicots
- Clade: Rosids
- Order: Myrtales
- Family: Myrtaceae
- Genus: Myrciaria
- Species: M. dubia

Binomial name
- Myrciaria dubia (Kunth) McVaugh

Synonyms
- Eugenia divaricata Benth.; Eugenia grandiglandulosa Kiaersk.; Marlierea macedoi D.Legrand [Invalid]; Myrciaria caurensis Steyerm.; Myrciaria divaricata (Benth.) O.Berg; Myrciaria lanceolata O.Berg; Myrciaria obscura O.Berg; Myrciaria paraensis O.Berg; Myrciaria phillyraeoides O.Berg; Myrciaria riedeliana O.Berg; Myrciaria spruceana O.Berg; Myrtus phillyraeoides (O.Berg) Willd. ex O.Berg; Psidium dubium Kunth

= Myrciaria dubia =

Species of plant in the myrtle family

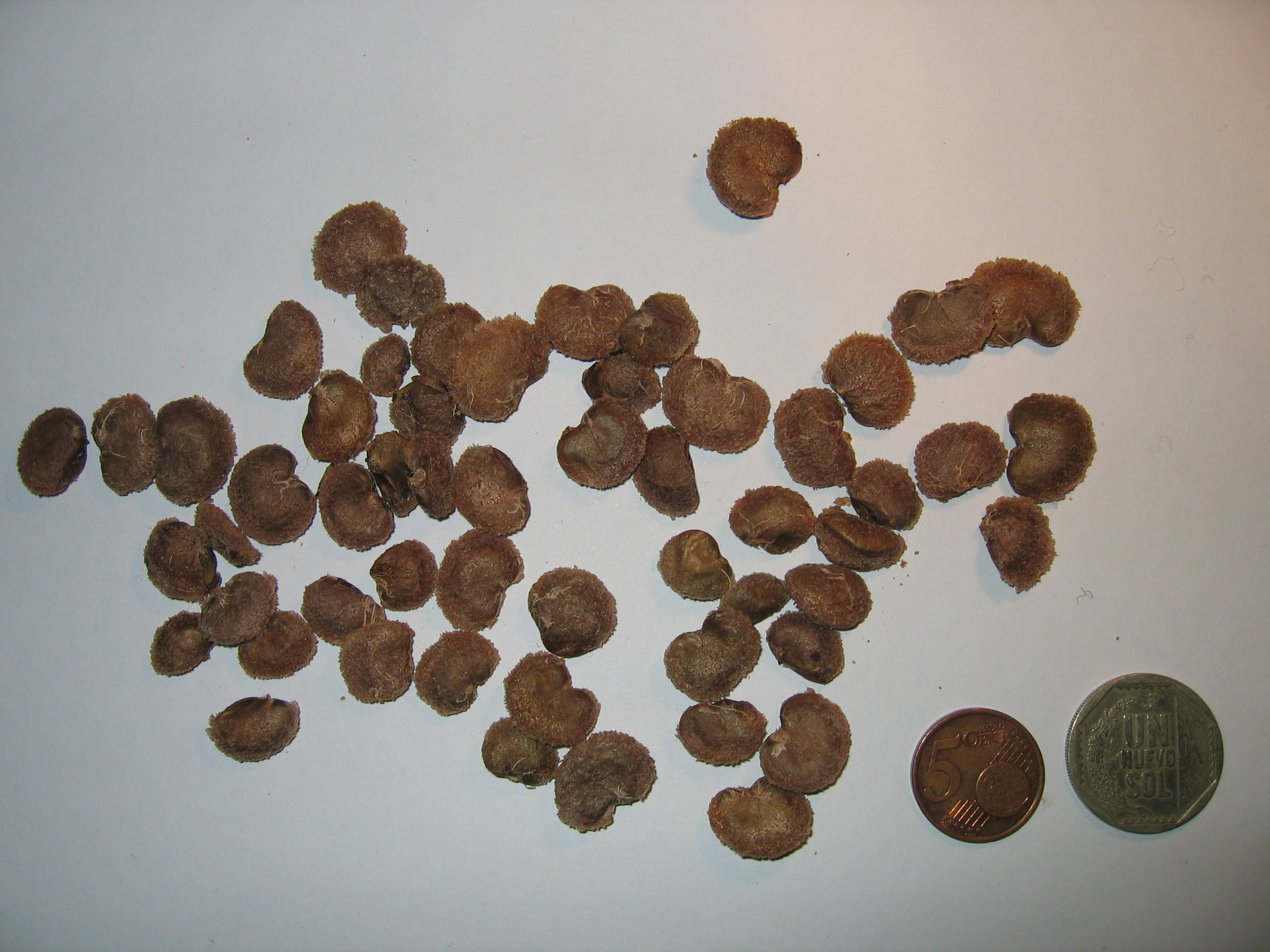
Dried camu-camu seeds

Myrciaria dubia, commonly known as camu-camu, caçari, araçá-d'água, or camocamo, is a species of plant in the family Myrtaceae. It is a small bushy riverside tree from the Amazon rainforest in Peru and Brazil, which grows to a height of 3–5 metres (10–15 feet) and bears a red/purple cherry-like fruit. It is a close relative of the false jaboticaba (Myrciaria vexator) and the guavaberry or rumberry (Myrciaria floribunda). As much as 2–3% of the fresh fruit by weight is vitamin C.

== Description ==
Camu-camu has small flowers with waxy white petals and a sweet-smelling aroma. It has bushy, feathery foliage. The evergreen, opposite leaves are lanceolate to elliptic. Individual leaves are 3–20 cm (1–8 in) in length and 1–2 cm (1/2–3/4 in) wide.

The camu-camu fruit is maroon or purple-black when fully ripe, around 25 mm (1.0 in) in diameter, with either sweet or acidic flesh.

== Native range ==
The current range of camu-camu consists of the Amazonian lowlands of Colombia, Ecuador, Peru, Bolivia, and Brazil. Its distribution extends from the center of Pará state, Brazil, along the mid and upper Amazon River to the eastern part of Peru; in the north, it appears in the Casiquiare canal and the upper and middle Orinoco River. In Brazil, it is found in Rondônia along the Maçangana and Urupá Rivers and in Amazonas, in the municipalities of Manaus and Manacapuru and along the Javari, Madeira, and Negro Rivers.

== Harvest ==
Long used by native peoples, wild camu-camu fruit is harvested directly into canoes. The fruit has only recently come into large-scale cultivation and sale to the world market, with Japan being the major buyer. The tree is relatively easy to cultivate within certain growing conditions. It survives best in hot, damp, tropical climates, but will grow in the subtropics, surviving temperatures down to just above freezing. It requires copious water. Fair trade is present in low-land production from the Association of Camu Camu Producers of the Peruvian Amazon.

The tree occurs in locally dense populations or even monospecific stands in Amazonian flood plains and riparian vegetation. The plant is extremely tolerant of flooding, withstanding four to five months with the roots and even much of the aerial parts submerged in water. The species propagates through seeds. In cultivation, the tree begins bearing fruits after attaining 2 cm (0.79 in) in stem girth (three years after emergence of the seedling). Plants flower at the end of the dry season and produce fruit at the peak of the rainy season. Observations with both wild and cultivated plants suggest that the trees can remain productive for several decades.

Wild trees have been found to yield 12 kg (26 lb) of fruit on average. At suggested planting densities of 600–1100 trees per one hectare (2 1/2 acres), about 12 tonnes (13 short tons) fruit may be derived in cultivation from one hectare.

== Nutrition ==
Per 100 g of fresh fruit:

- Protein 0.4 g
- Carbohydrates 5.9 g
- Starches 0.44 g
- Sugars 1.28 g
- Dietary Fiber 1.1 g
- Fat 0.2 g
- Calcium 15.7 mg
- Copper 0.2 mg
- Iron 0.53 mg
- Magnesium 12.4 mg
- Manganese 2.1 mg
- Potassium 83.9 mg
- Sodium 11.1 mg
- Zinc 0.2 mg
- Vitamin C: 1882–2280 mg depending on ripeness.

Camu-camu has an extraordinarily high vitamin C content (on the order of 2–3% of fresh weight). Vitamin C content declines as full maturity is reached, with a trade-off between vitamin C and flavor expression.

The fruit is rich in flavonoids, such as anthocyanins, flavonols, flavanols, catechins, delphinidin 3-glucoside, cyanidin 3-glucoside, ellagic acid, and rutin. Other analysis revealed the presence of gallic and ellagic acids, suggesting that the fruit possesses hydrolyzed tannins (gallotannin and ellagitannins).

== Uses ==
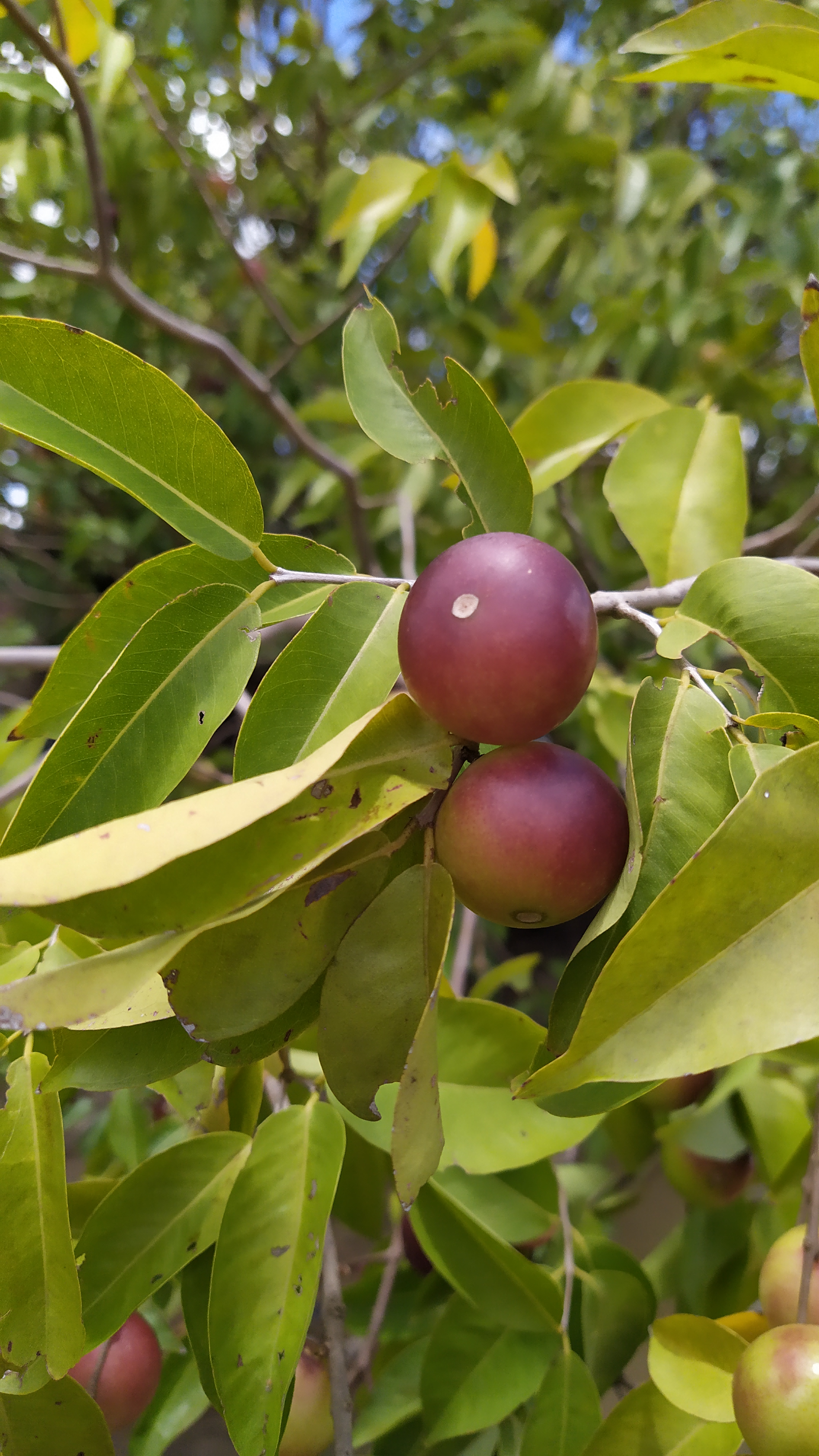
Camu-camu fruit

Documentation of traditional camu-camu uses is scarce. In traditional Amazonian societies, camu-camu is not likely to have ever been nutritionally relevant except for its vitamin C content. The fruit is extremely acidic and the flavor much like a sour grape with a large pit. The fruit is often used to make a very pink juice with a little sugar (like lemonade). A reddish pigment in the leathery skin of the fruit imparts a pink color on juices extracted from camu-camu. The aroma is subtle, but is not so captivating as in more popular fruits. Recently, camu-camu is used in ice creams and sweets and processed powder from the fruit pulp is beginning to be sold in the west as a health food in loose powder or capsule form.

Native Amazonian groups living on the banks of the Nanay River in the Loreto region of Peru, have been reported as using camu-camu as a traditional remedy for the treatment of malaria.

== Conservation issues ==
Overharvesting of wild camu-camu threatens to make it an endangered species. Efforts are underway to encourage commercial growing of camu-camu in the Amazon River basin.
