= Myrciaria evanida =

Conservation status
- Endangered (IUCN 3.1)

Scientific classification
- Kingdom: Plantae
- Clade: Tracheophytes
- Clade: Angiosperms
- Clade: Eudicots
- Clade: Rosids
- Order: Myrtales
- Family: Myrtaceae
- Genus: Myrciaria
- Species: M. evanida

Binomial name
- Myrciaria evanida Sobral

Species of plant in the myrtle family

Myrciaria evanida is a species of flowering plant in the family Myrtaceae. It is a tree endemic to Espírito Santo and Minas Gerais in southeastern Brazil. First described in 2013, it resembles Myrciaria floribunda.
