= Myrciaria formosa =

Conservation status
- Vulnerable (IUCN 3.1)

Scientific classification
- Kingdom: Plantae
- Clade: Tracheophytes
- Clade: Angiosperms
- Clade: Eudicots
- Clade: Rosids
- Order: Myrtales
- Family: Myrtaceae
- Genus: Myrciaria
- Species: M. formosa

Binomial name
- Myrciaria formosa (Urb.) Z.Acosta & García-Beltrán

Synonyms
- Plinia formosa Urb.

Species of flowering plant

Myrciaria formosa is a species of flowering plant in the family Myrtaceae. It is a shrub or tree endemic to southeastern Cuba. It grows up to 5 metres tall. It is known from the Moa-Baracoa mountains, where it grows in lowland rainforest and secondary forest up to 450 metres elevation.
