= Myrciaria pallida =

Conservation status
- Endangered (IUCN 3.1)

Scientific classification
- Kingdom: Plantae
- Clade: Tracheophytes
- Clade: Angiosperms
- Clade: Eudicots
- Clade: Rosids
- Order: Myrtales
- Family: Myrtaceae
- Genus: Myrciaria
- Species: M. pallida

Binomial name
- Myrciaria pallida O.Berg

Synonyms
- Myrciaria sulcata Mattos

Species of plant in the myrtle family

Myrciaria pallida is a species of a flowering plant in the family Myrtaceae. It is a shrub or tree endemic to southeastern Brazil.
