= Myrciaria borinquena =

Conservation status
- Endangered (IUCN 3.1)

Scientific classification
- Kingdom: Plantae
- Clade: Tracheophytes
- Clade: Angiosperms
- Clade: Eudicots
- Clade: Rosids
- Order: Myrtales
- Family: Myrtaceae
- Genus: Myrciaria
- Species: M. borinquena

Binomial name
- Myrciaria borinquena Alain

Species of plant in the myrtle family

Myrciaria borinquena is a species of flowering plant in the Myrtaceae genus . Myrciaria borinquena has a common name of false tamarisk. This species is endemic to the forests of Puerto Rico, specifically in low elevations in forests. It can also be found in other tropical, subtropical, and temperate regions due to their great capacity for adaptation in different environments. It is a small tree that produces round fruit around 25 mm (1.0 in) in diameter.

== General uses ==
Species within the Myrciaria genus have been shown to have a variety of uses. Some medicinal uses for the species in the genus that have been studied include treatments for dermatological and fungal diseases. Due to high antioxidant content in the Myrciaria genus, these species are also used as anti-inflammatory agents.
