= Myrciaria ibarrae =

Conservation status
- Least Concern (IUCN 3.1)

Scientific classification
- Kingdom: Plantae
- Clade: Embryophytes
- Clade: Tracheophytes
- Clade: Spermatophytes
- Clade: Angiosperms
- Clade: Eudicots
- Clade: Rosids
- Order: Myrtales
- Family: Myrtaceae
- Genus: Myrciaria
- Species: M. ibarrae

Binomial name
- Myrciaria ibarrae Lundell

Synonyms
- Myrciaria longicaudata Lundell

Species of plant in the myrtle family

Myrciaria ibarrae, commonly known as guayabillo in Guatemala, is a species of plant in the family Myrtaceae. First described in 1961, it is a tree which grows to between 8 and 10 metres (26 and 33 ft) tall, and is endemic to south-east Mexico and Guatemala.
