= Myrciaria myrtifolia =

Conservation status
- Endangered (IUCN 3.1)

Scientific classification
- Kingdom: Plantae
- Clade: Tracheophytes
- Clade: Angiosperms
- Clade: Eudicots
- Clade: Rosids
- Order: Myrtales
- Family: Myrtaceae
- Genus: Myrciaria
- Species: M. myrtifolia

Binomial name
- Myrciaria myrtifolia Alain

Species of plant in the myrtle family

Myrciaria myrtifolia, commonly known as the ridgetop guavaberry, is a species of flowering plant in the family Myrtaceae. It is endemic to Puerto Rico and it was first described in 1983. It is a shrub found mainly at low elevations, in mountain foothills in the south-east, and coastal plains in the south-west.
