= Myrciaria vismeifolia =

Conservation status
- Least Concern (IUCN 3.1)

Scientific classification
- Kingdom: Plantae
- Clade: Embryophytes
- Clade: Tracheophytes
- Clade: Spermatophytes
- Clade: Angiosperms
- Clade: Eudicots
- Clade: Rosids
- Order: Myrtales
- Family: Myrtaceae
- Genus: Myrciaria
- Species: M. vismeifolia

Binomial name
- Myrciaria vismeifolia (Benth.) O.Berg

Synonyms
- Eugenia vismeifolia Benth.

Species of plant in the myrtle family

Myrciaria vismeifolia is a species of plant in the family Myrtaceae. It has been found in Bolivia, Brazil, French Guiana, Guyana, Panama, Suriname, and Venezuela. The tree grows to between 4 to 6 metres (13 to 20 ft) high, and produces an edible berry up to 10 mm (0.39 in) in diameter.
