= Myrciaria rupestris =

Conservation status
- Critically Endangered (IUCN 3.1)

Scientific classification
- Kingdom: Plantae
- Clade: Tracheophytes
- Clade: Angiosperms
- Clade: Eudicots
- Clade: Rosids
- Order: Myrtales
- Family: Myrtaceae
- Genus: Myrciaria
- Species: M. rupestris

Binomial name
- Myrciaria rupestris (Ekman & Urb.) Z.Acosta

Synonyms
- Myrciaria rubrinervis (Urb.) Z.Acosta; Plinia rubrinervis Urb.; Plinia rupestris Ekman & Urb.

Species of plant in the myrtle family

Myrciaria rupestris is a species of flowering plant in the family Myrtaceae. It is a shrub or tree endemic to western Cuba. Plinia rubrinervis and Plinia rupestris were transferred to Myrciaria as this single species in 2014.
