= Myrciaria pilosa =

Conservation status
- Least Concern (IUCN 3.1)

Scientific classification
- Kingdom: Plantae
- Clade: Tracheophytes
- Clade: Angiosperms
- Clade: Eudicots
- Clade: Rosids
- Order: Myrtales
- Family: Myrtaceae
- Genus: Myrciaria
- Species: M. pilosa

Binomial name
- Myrciaria pilosa Sobral & Couto

Species of plant in the myrtle family

Myrciaria pilosa, commonly known as cambucá do sertão (interior cambucá), is a species of plant in the family Myrtaceae. It is endemic to the state of Ceará in the north-east of Brazil. The plant is a small tree that grows to between 1.5 and 2 metres (4.9 and 6.6 ft) tall, and produces edible, red, spherical fruit round 20 mm (0.79 in) in diameter.

Research has shown that the essential oil from the leaves of this plant has potential as an antimicrobial drug to control infection by multi-resistant strains of Staphylococcus aureus.
