= Myrciaria racemosa =

Scientific classification
- Kingdom: Plantae
- Clade: Embryophytes
- Clade: Tracheophytes
- Clade: Spermatophytes
- Clade: Angiosperms
- Clade: Eudicots
- Clade: Rosids
- Order: Myrtales
- Family: Myrtaceae
- Genus: Myrciaria
- Species: M. racemosa

Binomial name
- Myrciaria racemosa M.L.Kawas.

Species of plant in the myrtle family

Myrciaria racemosa is a species of plant in the family Myrtaceae. It is endemic to Ecuador and was first described in 2011. It is a tree that grow to between 18 and 28 meters (59 and 92 ft) high, with yellowish-white flowers. It is named after its unusual racemose inflorescence.
