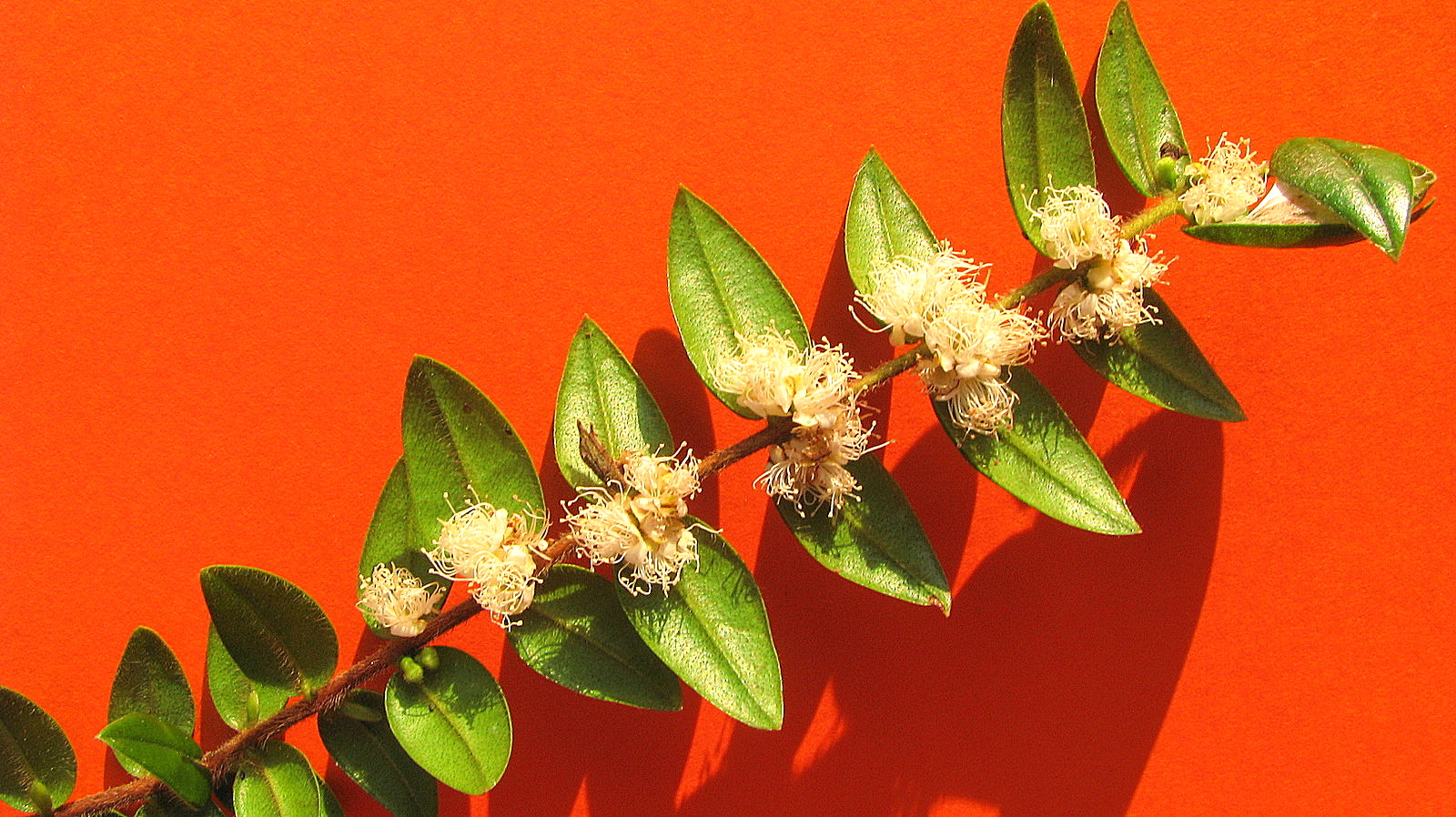

Conservation status
- Least Concern (IUCN 3.1)

Scientific classification
- Kingdom: Plantae
- Clade: Embryophytes
- Clade: Tracheophytes
- Clade: Spermatophytes
- Clade: Angiosperms
- Clade: Eudicots
- Clade: Rosids
- Order: Myrtales
- Family: Myrtaceae
- Genus: Myrciaria
- Species: M. strigipes

Binomial name
- Myrciaria strigipes O.Berg

Synonyms
- Myrciaria strigipes var. longifolia O.Berg; Paramyrciaria strigipes (O.Berg) Sobral; Plinia strigipes (O.Berg) Sobral

= Myrciaria strigipes =

Species of plant in the myrtle family

Myrciaria strigipes, commonly known as cambucá da praia (beach cambucá) or cabeludinha da praia (beach, little hairy), is a species of plant in the family Myrtaceae. It is an evergreen shrub or small tree, endemic to Bahia and Espírito Santo in the east of Brazil. The plant grows up to between 4 and 9 metres (13 and 30 ft) tall, and produces edible yellowish fruits between 22 and 28 mm (0.87 and 1.10 in) in diameter. Consumed raw, the fruit has been described as tasting somewhere between Myrciaria glazioviana and Plinia cauliflora.
