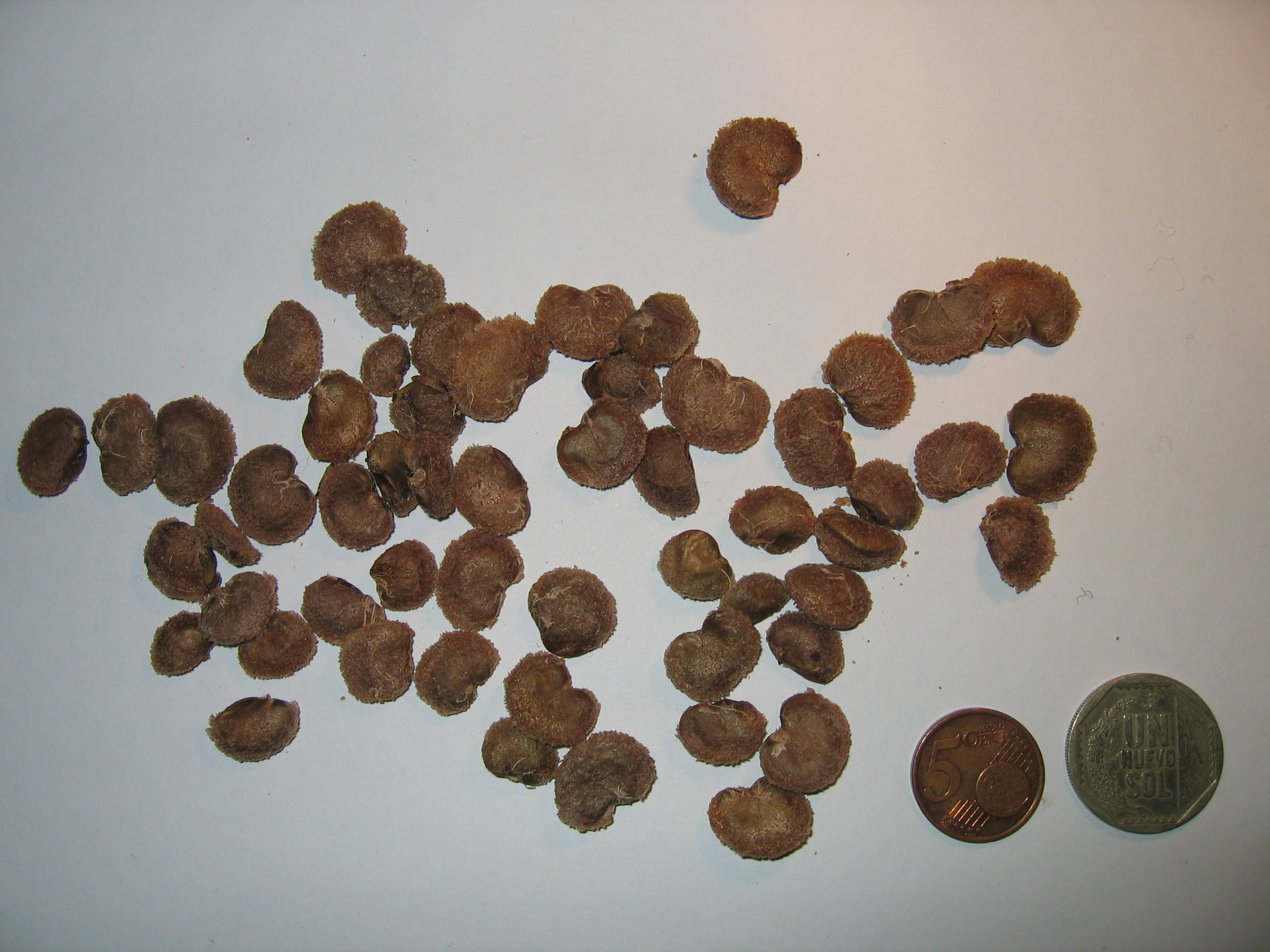
- Seeds of M. dubia

Scientific classification
- Kingdom: Plantae
- Clade: Tracheophytes
- Clade: Angiosperms
- Clade: Eudicots
- Clade: Rosids
- Order: Myrtales
- Family: Myrtaceae
- Subfamily: Myrtoideae
- Tribe: Myrteae
- Genus: Myrciaria; O.Berg

Type species
- Myrciaria tenella (DC.) O.Berg

Synonyms
- Myrciariopsis Kausel; Paramyrciaria Kausel

= Myrciaria =

Genus of large shrubs and small trees

Myrciaria is a genus of large shrubs and small trees described as a genus in 1856. It is native to Central and South America, Mexico, and the West Indies, with many of the species endemic to Brazil. Common names include hivapuru, sabará, and ybapuru.

The jaboticabas are a significant commercial fruit in Brazil. The fruit is grapelike in size and appearance, and often likened to a muscadine grape in taste. Myrciaria dubia, the camu-camu berry, is grown primarily in flood-zone areas of Peru and has one of the highest vitamin C (ascorbic acid) concentrations of any fruit, alongside Terminalia ferdinandiana.

== Species ==
48 species are accepted.

- Myrciaria alagoana Sobral – Alagoas
- Myrciaria alta T.B.Flores & Sobral – Espírito Santo
- Myrciaria arenicola (Urquiola & Z.Acosta) Z.Acosta & García-Beltrán – western Cuba
- Myrciaria baracoensis (Borhidi) Z.Acosta & García-Beltrán – southeastern Cuba
- Myrciaria bissei (Z.Acosta & Urquiola) Z.Acosta & García-Beltrán – Cuba
- Myrciaria borinquena Alain – Puerto Rico
- Myrciaria caerulescens J.M.A.Braga, M.T.C.Lacerda & Stadnik – Bahia
- Myrciaria cambuca Costa-Lima & E.C.O.Chagas – eastern Brazil
- Myrciaria caricensis (Urb.) Z.Acosta & García-Beltrán – northwestern and central Hispaniola
- Myrciaria cidrensis (Urb.) Z.Acosta & García-Beltrán – Haiti (Massif du Nord)
- Myrciaria coimbrarum Villarroel & Lino-Villalba – Bolivia
- Myrciaria cordata O.Berg – Guyana, Bolívar, northern Brazil
- Myrciaria cubensis (Griseb.) Z.Acosta & García-Beltrán – western Cuba
- Myrciaria cuspidata O.Berg – Brazil, Bolivia, Paraguay
- Myrciaria delicatula (DC.) O.Berg – Brazil, Bolivia, Paraguay, northeastern Argentina
- Myrciaria dermatodes (Urb.) Z.Acosta & García-Beltrán – western Cuba
- Myrciaria disticha O.Berg – eastern Brazil
- Myrciaria dubia (Kunth) McVaugh – Camu-camu – Guyana, Venezuela, northern Brazil, Colombia, Ecuador, Peru
- Myrciaria evanida Sobral – eastern Brazil
- Myrciaria ferruginea O.Berg – Espírito Santo, Minas Gerais
- Myrciaria floribunda (H.West ex Willd.) O.Berg – Rumberry, guavaberry – from Mexico and West Indies to Paraguay
- Myrciaria formosa (Urb.) Z.Acosta & García-Beltrán – southeastern Cuba
- Myrciaria glanduliflora (Kiaersk.) Mattos & D.Legrand – Minas Gerais
- Myrciaria glazioviana (Kiaersk.) G.M.Barroso ex Sobral – Cabeludinha, yellow jaboticaba – eastern Brazil
- Myrciaria glomerata O.Berg – Red cabeludinha – eastern Brazil
- Myrciaria guaquiea (Kiaersk.) Mattos & D.Legrand – eastern Brazil
- Myrciaria ibarrae Lundell – Guatemala, Campeche, Quintana Roo
- Myrciaria icardiana (Urb.) Z.Acosta & García-Beltrán – Haiti (Massif de la Hotte)
- Myrciaria microcycla (Urb.) Z.Acosta & García-Beltrán – southwestern Dominican Republic
- Myrciaria moaensis (Borhidi) Z.Acosta & García-Beltrán – eastern Cuba (Sierra de Moa)
- Myrciaria myrtifolia Alain – Puerto Rico
- Myrciaria orthoclada (Urb.) Z.Acosta & García-Beltrán – western Cuba
- Myrciaria pallida O.Berg – southeastern Brazil
- Myrciaria pilosa Sobral & Couto – Bahia, Minas Gerais
- Myrciaria plinioides D.Legrand – southern Brazil
- Myrciaria puberulenta B.Holst – southern Venezuela
- Myrciaria racemosa M.L.Kawas. – Ecuador
- Myrciaria ramosissima (Urb.) Z.Acosta & García-Beltrán – eastern Cuba
- Myrciaria recurvata (Urb.) Z.Acosta & García-Beltrán – western Cuba (Sierra del Rosario)
- Myrciaria rojasii D.Legrand. – Brazil, Paraguay
- Myrciaria rupestris (Ekman & Urb.) Z.Acosta – western Cuba
- Myrciaria stenophylla (Urb.) Z.Acosta & García-Beltrán – Cuba (Sierra de Nipe)
- Myrciaria strigipes O.Berg – Beach cabeludinha – eastern Brazil
- Myrciaria tenella (DC.) O.Berg – Hispaniola, Venezuela, French Guiana, Brazil, Peru, Bolivia, Paraguay, Uruguay, northern Argentina
- Myrciaria una Costa-Lima & E.C.O.Chagas – northeastern Brazil
- Myrciaria vexator McVaugh – Blue grape – Costa Rica, Panama, Venezuela
- Myrciaria vismeifolia (Benth.) O.Berg – Venezuela, French Guiana, Suriname, Guyana, northern Brazil, Peru, Bolivia

== Formerly placed here ==
- Plinia cauliflora (Gardner) O.Berg (as M. cauliflora (Mart.) O.Berg and *M. jaboticaba (Vell.) O.Berg)
