= Cambuím =

Cambuím, camboim, or cambuí are the common names for a number of species of plant in the family Myrtaceae.

It may also refer to:

== Plants ==
- Myrciaria cuspidata
- Myrciaria delicatula
- Myrciaria plinioides
- Myrciaria tenella

== See also ==
- Cambuí (disambiguation)
