= Myrciaria puberulenta =

Conservation status
- Data Deficient (IUCN 3.1)

Scientific classification
- Kingdom: Plantae
- Clade: Tracheophytes
- Clade: Angiosperms
- Clade: Eudicots
- Clade: Rosids
- Order: Myrtales
- Family: Myrtaceae
- Genus: Myrciaria
- Species: M. puberulenta

Binomial name
- Myrciaria puberulenta B.Holst

Species of plant in the myrtle family

Myrciaria puberulenta is a species of flowering plant in the family Myrtaceae. It is a tree endemic to evergreen moist forests in southern Venezuela and was first described in 2002. The Piaroa people cultivate it for its fruit and call it "kuyaeri".

== Description ==
Myrciaria puberulenta is a tree which grows up to 15 m (49 ft) tall, and produces dark purple fruits which are 25–35 mm (1.0–1.4 in) in diameter.
