= Myrciaria glanduliflora =

Conservation status
- Least Concern (IUCN 3.1)

Scientific classification
- Kingdom: Plantae
- Clade: Embryophytes
- Clade: Tracheophytes
- Clade: Spermatophytes
- Clade: Angiosperms
- Clade: Eudicots
- Clade: Rosids
- Order: Myrtales
- Family: Myrtaceae
- Genus: Myrciaria
- Species: M. glanduliflora

Binomial name
- Myrciaria glanduliflora (Kiaersk.) Mattos & D.Legrand

Synonyms
- Eugenia glanduliflora Kiaersk.

Species of plant in the myrtle family

Myrciaria glanduliflora is a species of plant in the family Myrtaceae. It is endemic to Minas Gerais, Brazil, and was first described in 1975.
