= Myrciaria rojasii =

Scientific classification
- Kingdom: Plantae
- Clade: Embryophytes
- Clade: Tracheophytes
- Clade: Spermatophytes
- Clade: Angiosperms
- Clade: Eudicots
- Clade: Rosids
- Order: Myrtales
- Family: Myrtaceae
- Genus: Myrciaria
- Species: M. rojasii

Binomial name
- Myrciaria rojasii D.Legrand

Synonyms
- Myrciaria tapiraguayensis Barb.Rodr. ex Chodat & Hassl. [Invalid]; Paramyrciaria tapiraguayensis (Barb.Rodr. ex Chodat & Hassl.) Sobral [Invalid]

Species of plant in the myrtle family

Myrciaria rojasii is a species of plant in the family Myrtaceae. It is endemic to west-central Brazil and Paraguay. It was first described in 1963 by Carlos Maria Diego Enrique Legrand.
