= Myrciaria cordata =

Conservation status
- Data Deficient (IUCN 3.1)

Scientific classification
- Kingdom: Plantae
- Clade: Tracheophytes
- Clade: Angiosperms
- Clade: Eudicots
- Clade: Rosids
- Order: Myrtales
- Family: Myrtaceae
- Genus: Myrciaria
- Species: M. cordata

Binomial name
- Myrciaria cordata O.Berg

Species of plant in the myrtle family

Myrciaria cordata is a species of flowering plant in the family Myrtaceae. It is a shrub or tree native to northern Brazil, Guyana, and southeastern Venezuela. It is known from two specimens collected from British Guiana (present-day Guyana) and Rio Branco, Mato Grosso, Brazil.
