= Myrciaria disticha =

Conservation status
- Least Concern (IUCN 3.1)

Scientific classification
- Kingdom: Plantae
- Clade: Embryophytes
- Clade: Tracheophytes
- Clade: Spermatophytes
- Clade: Angiosperms
- Clade: Eudicots
- Clade: Rosids
- Order: Myrtales
- Family: Myrtaceae
- Genus: Myrciaria
- Species: M. disticha

Binomial name
- Myrciaria disticha O.Berg

Synonyms
- Eugenia biseriata Kiaersk.; Myrciaria disticha var. disticha; Myrciaria disticha var. fluminensis O.Berg

Species of plant in the myrtle family

Myrciaria disticha is a species of plant in the family Myrtaceae. It is endemic to the east of Brazil. The plant is a semideciduous shrub or small tree that grows to between 4 and 6 metres (13 and 20 ft) tall, and produces edible, reddish berries around 10 mm (0.4 in) in diameter.
