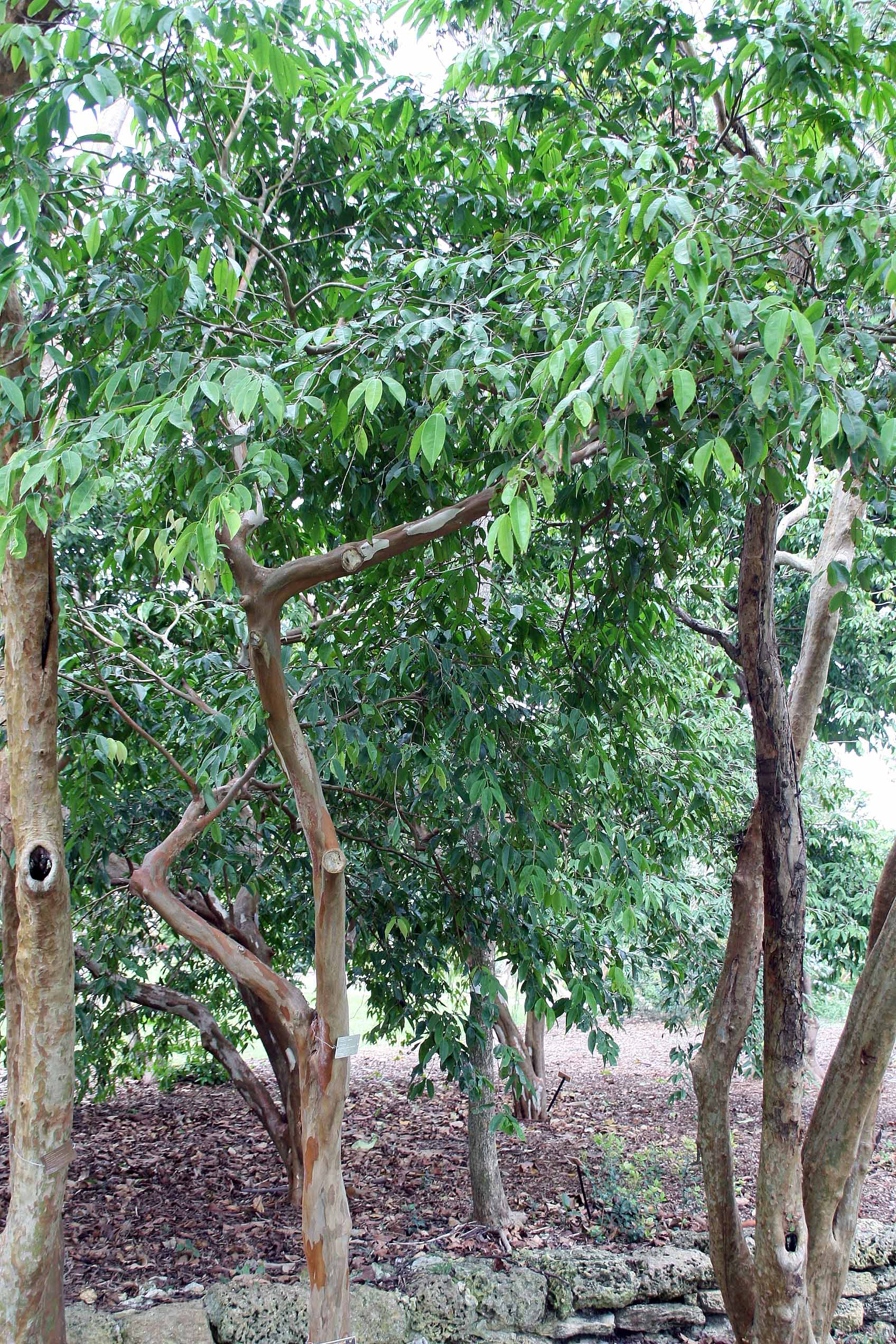

Scientific classification
- Kingdom: Plantae
- Clade: Embryophytes
- Clade: Tracheophytes
- Clade: Spermatophytes
- Clade: Angiosperms
- Clade: Eudicots
- Clade: Rosids
- Order: Myrtales
- Family: Myrtaceae
- Genus: Myrciaria
- Species: M. vexator

Binomial name
- Myrciaria vexator McVaugh

= Myrciaria vexator =

Species of plant in the myrtle family

Myrciaria vexator, the false jaboticaba, or blue grape tree, is a species of plant in the family Myrtaceae.

== Description ==
M. vexator is a slow-growing evergreen tree that can grow up to 10 metres (33 ft) tall. The fruit is dark purple and plum-sized. It is bigger, darker, and has thicker skin than the Jaboticaba. The leaves are layered and deep green, the bark peels, and the flowers are small and white.

== Distribution ==
Myrciaria vexator is endemic to Costa Rica, Panama, and Venezuela. It is frequently found growing on road verges.
