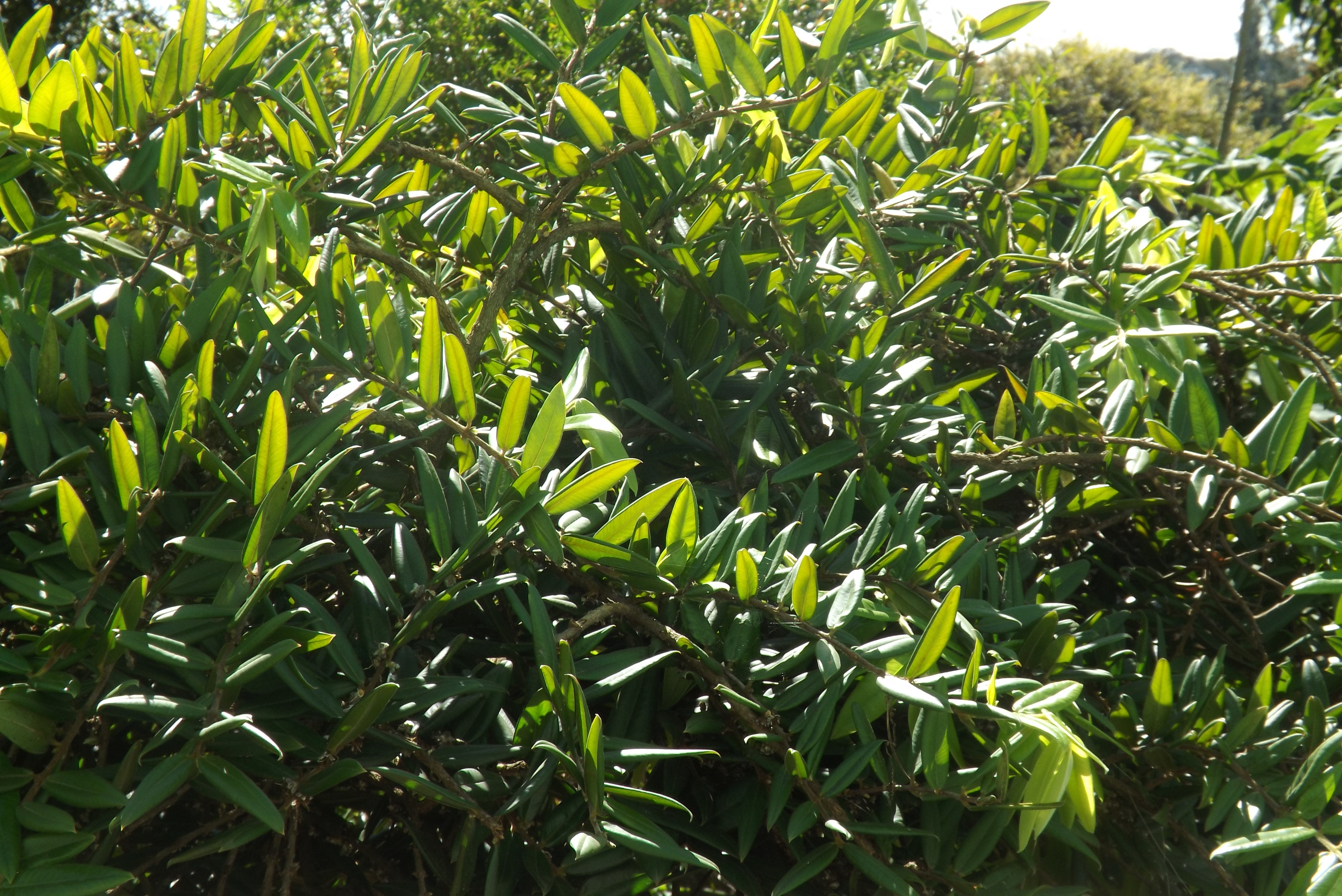
- Myrciaria glomerata

Conservation status
- Least Concern (IUCN 3.1)

Scientific classification
- Kingdom: Plantae
- Clade: Embryophytes
- Clade: Tracheophytes
- Clade: Spermatophytes
- Clade: Angiosperms
- Clade: Eudicots
- Clade: Rosids
- Order: Myrtales
- Family: Myrtaceae
- Genus: Myrciaria
- Species: M. glomerata

Binomial name
- Myrciaria glomerata O.Berg

Synonyms
- Eugenia cabelludo Kiaersk.; Marlierea antrocola Kiaersk.; Paramyrciaria glomerata (O.Berg) Sobral; Plinia glomerata (O.Berg) Amshoff

= Myrciaria glomerata =

Species of plant in the myrtle family

Myrciaria glomerata, commonly known as cabeludinha-vermelha (red cabeludinha) or cabeluda-escarlate (scarlet cabeluda), is a species of plant in the family Myrtaceae. It is an evergreen shrub or small tree, endemic to the north and east of Brazil. Myrciaria glomerata has historically been used to incorrectly describe Myrciaria glazioviana.

== Description ==
Myrciaria glomerata grows up to 8 metres (26 ft) tall, and produces edible red fruits around 20 mm (0.8 in) in diameter. The fruit pulp is slightly yellow and rich in vitamin C.

The leaves of Myrciaria glomerata are simple, opposite, lanceolate, pinnate and chartaceous. They are between 3 and 4 cm (1.2 and 1.6 in) wide, and between 9 and 11 cm (3.5 and 4.3 in) long. The top of the leaves are bright dark green, and the underside is light green and very hairy. The hairiness of Myrciaria glomerata is helpful for the identification of this species.
