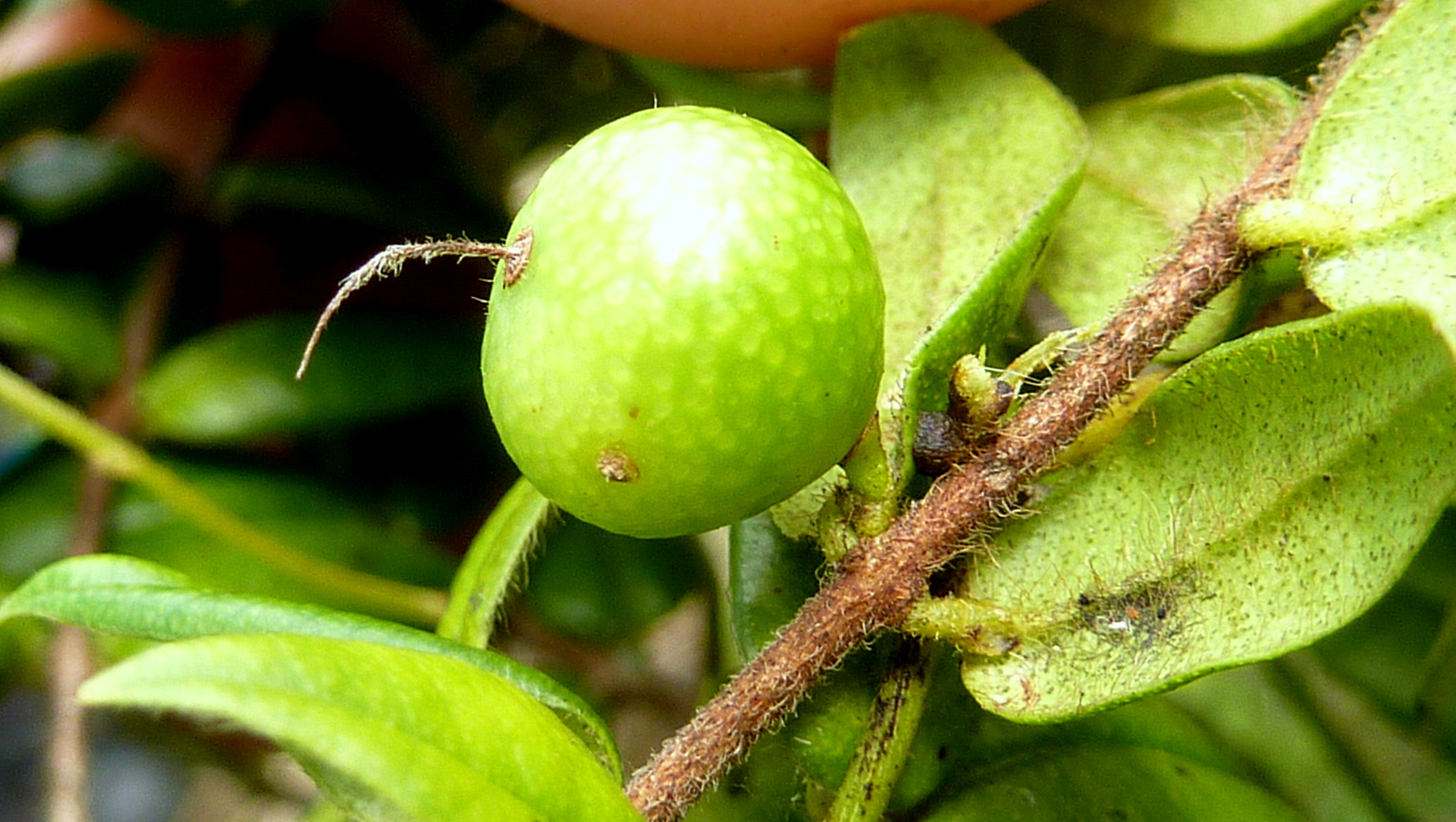
- Myrciaria ferruginea, Bahia, Brazil

Conservation status
- Least Concern (IUCN 3.1)

Scientific classification
- Kingdom: Plantae
- Clade: Embryophytes
- Clade: Tracheophytes
- Clade: Spermatophytes
- Clade: Angiosperms
- Clade: Eudicots
- Clade: Rosids
- Order: Myrtales
- Family: Myrtaceae
- Genus: Myrciaria
- Species: M. ferruginea

Binomial name
- Myrciaria ferruginea O.Berg

= Myrciaria ferruginea =

Species of plant in the myrtle family

Myrciaria ferruginea is a disputed species of plant in the family Myrtaceae and is endemic to the east of Brazil. Some authorities believe that this plant is a synonym of Myrciaria floribunda.
