= Myrciaria plinioides =

Conservation status
- Endangered (IUCN 3.1)

Scientific classification
- Kingdom: Plantae
- Clade: Embryophytes
- Clade: Tracheophytes
- Clade: Spermatophytes
- Clade: Angiosperms
- Clade: Eudicots
- Clade: Rosids
- Order: Myrtales
- Family: Myrtaceae
- Genus: Myrciaria
- Species: M. plinioides

Binomial name
- Myrciaria plinioides Legr.

Species of plant in the myrtle family

Myrciaria plinioides, commonly known as camboim, cambuim, or cambuí, is a species of plant in the family Myrtaceae. It is a shrub that is endemic to Rio Grande do Sul in the south of Brazil.
