= Myrciaria delicatula =

Conservation status
- Least Concern (IUCN 3.1)

Scientific classification
- Kingdom: Plantae
- Clade: Embryophytes
- Clade: Tracheophytes
- Clade: Spermatophytes
- Clade: Angiosperms
- Clade: Eudicots
- Clade: Rosids
- Order: Myrtales
- Family: Myrtaceae
- Genus: Myrciaria
- Species: M. delicatula

Binomial name
- Myrciaria delicatula (DC.) O.Berg

Synonyms
- Eugenia delicatula DC.; Eugenia delicatula var. conferta Kiaersk.; Eugenia maschalantha Kiaersk. [Illegitimate]; Luma maschalantha Herter; Myrciaria delicatula var. acutifolia O.Berg; Myrciaria delicatula var. angustifolia O.Berg; Myrciaria delicatula var. conferta O.Berg; Myrciaria delicatula var. delicatula; Myrciaria delicatula var. latifolia O.Berg; Myrciaria linearifolia O.Berg; Myrciaria macrocarpa Usteri; Myrciaria maschalantha (Herter) Mattos & D.Legrand; Myrciaria micrantha Barb.Rodr. ex Chodat & Hassl. [Invalid]; Paramyrciaria delicatula (DC.) Kausel; Paramyrciaria delicatula var. argentinensis Kausel; Paramyrciaria delicatula var. linearifolia (O.Berg) O.Berg

Species of plant in the myrtle family

Myrciaria delicatula, commonly known as cambuí uvaia doce, cambuí graudo, cambuim, or cambu branco, is a species of plant in the family Myrtaceae.

== Distribution ==
Myrciaria delicatula is found in araucaria moist forests, gallery forests and grasslands in Argentina, Paraguay, Bolivia, and southern and eastern Brazil.

== Description ==
Myrciaria delicatula grows slowly to a semideciduous shrub or small tree, between 4 and 10 metres (13 and 33 ft) tall. The leaves are simple, hairless, opposite, with a stem of between 2 and 4 mm long, and a texture similar to cardboard. The leaf is between 2 and 3.5 cm (0.8 and 1.4 in) long and between 0.5 and 1.1 cm wide, has a wedge-shaped base, and ends with a short tip. The plant produces edible black berries around 10mm in diameter, containing between 1 and 4 seeds. The flavour of the fruit has been compared to that of Eugenia pyriformis.
