= Myrciaria cuspidata =

Conservation status
- Least Concern (IUCN 3.1)

Scientific classification
- Kingdom: Plantae
- Clade: Tracheophytes
- Clade: Angiosperms
- Clade: Eudicots
- Clade: Rosids
- Order: Myrtales
- Family: Myrtaceae
- Genus: Myrciaria
- Species: M. cuspidata

Binomial name
- Myrciaria cuspidata O.Berg

Synonyms
- Eugenia alegrensis Kiaersk.; Eugenia minensis (O.Berg) Kiaersk.; Eugenia tenella Miq. [Illegitimate]; Myrciaria apiculata Barb.Rodr. ex Chodat & Hassl. [Invalid]; Myrciaria cuspidata var. acuminatissima O.Berg; Myrciaria cuspidata var. diffusa O.Berg; Myrciaria cuspidata var. humilis O.Berg; Myrciaria cuspidata var. latifolia O.Berg; Myrciaria cuspidata var. stricta O.Berg; Myrciaria herbacea O.Berg; Myrciaria minensis O.Berg; Myrciaria recurvipetala Barb.Rodr. ex Chodat & Hassl. [Invalid]

Species of tree in the myrtle family

Myrciaria cuspidata, commonly known as camboim or cambuím, is a species of plant in the family Myrtaceae. It is found in coastal forests and semideciduous forests in Brazil, Paraguay and Argentina. It grows slowly to a semideciduous shrub or small tree, between 3 and 6 metres (9.8 and 20 ft) tall, with orange or black berries around 10 mm (0.39 in) in diameter.

== Etymology ==
The name Cambuím comes from Tupi–Guarani and means "fruit that is born on the thin branch".
