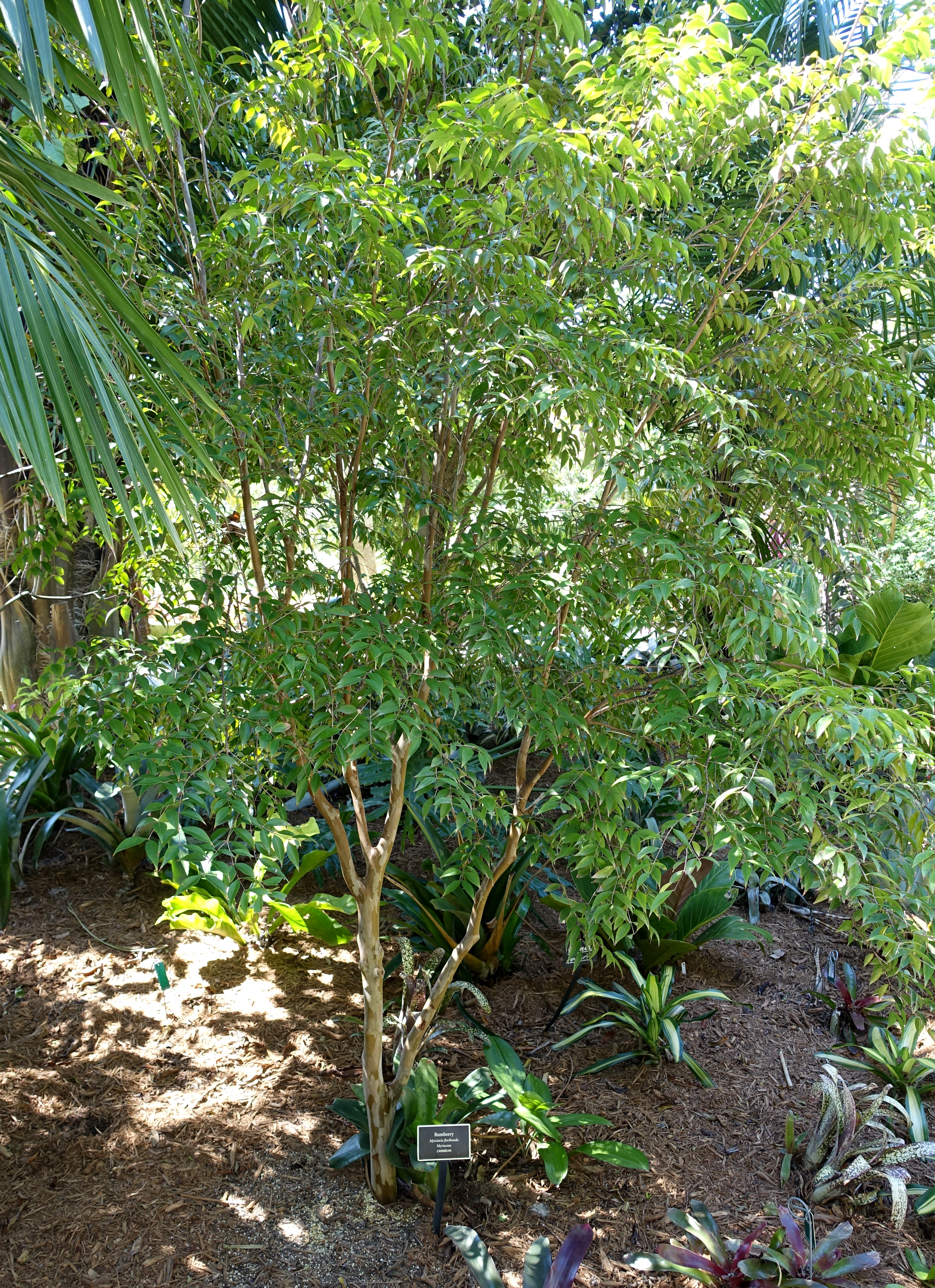

Conservation status
- Least Concern (IUCN 3.1)

Scientific classification
- Kingdom: Plantae
- Clade: Tracheophytes
- Clade: Angiosperms
- Clade: Eudicots
- Clade: Rosids
- Order: Myrtales
- Family: Myrtaceae
- Genus: Myrciaria
- Species: M. floribunda

Binomial name
- Myrciaria floribunda (H.West ex Willd.) O.Berg

Synonyms
- Expand list: Acinodendron sellowianum (O. Berg) Kuntze; Calyptranthes floribunda (H.West ex Willd.) Blume; Caryophyllus floribundus (H.West ex Willd.) Blume; Eugenia asa-grayi Krug & Urb.; Eugenia ciliolata Cambess.; Eugenia floribunda H.West ex Willd.; Eugenia leucophloea (O.Berg) Kiaersk.; Eugenia leucophloea var. warmingiana Kiaersk.; Eugenia maranhensis (O.Berg) Kiaersk.; Eugenia maximiliana DC.; Eugenia oneillii Lundell; Eugenia polyneura Urb. [Illegitimate]; Eugenia protracta Steud.; Eugenia pycnoneura Urb.; Eugenia salzmannii Benth.; Marlierea brachymischa Kiaersk.; Myrciaria amazonica O.Berg; Myrciaria arborea D.Legrand; Myrciaria arborea var. rostrata Mattos; Myrciaria axillaris O.Berg; Myrciaria ciliolata (Cambess.) O.Berg; Myrciaria ciliolata var. warmingiana (Kiaersk.) Mattos; Myrciaria ferruginea O.Berg; Myrciaria leucadendron O.Berg; Myrciaria leucophloea O.Berg; Myrciaria leucophloea var. conferta O.Berg; Myrciaria leucophloea var. laxa O.Berg; Myrciaria leucophloea var. warmingiana (Kiaersk.) Mattos; Myrciaria longicaudata Lundell; Myrciaria longipes O.Berg; Myrciaria longipes var. opaca O.Berg; Myrciaria longipes var. pellucida O.Berg; Myrciaria maragnanensis O.Berg; Myrciaria maranhensis O.Berg; Myrciaria maximiliana (DC.) O.Berg; Myrciaria mexicana Lundell; Myrciaria oneillii (Lundell) I.M.Johnst.; Myrciaria prasina O.Berg; Myrciaria protracta (Steud.) O.Berg; Myrciaria salzmannii (Benth.) O.Berg; Myrciaria schuechiana O.Berg; Myrciaria schuechiana var. deflexa O.Berg; Myrciaria schuechiana var. latifolia O.Berg; Myrciaria sellowiana O.Berg; Myrciaria splendens O.Berg; Myrciaria tenuiramis O.Berg; Myrciaria tolypantha O.Berg; Myrciaria tolypantha var. angustifolia O.Berg; Myrciaria tolypantha var. latifolia O.Berg; Myrciaria uliginosa O.Berg; Myrciaria verticillata O.Berg; Myrtus floribunda (H.West ex Willd.) Spreng.; Myrtus micrantha Nees & Mart.; Myrtus verticillata Salzm. ex O.Berg [Illegitimate]; Paramyrciaria ciliolata (Cambess.) Rotman; Plinia acutissima Urb.; Plinia asa-grayi (Krug & Urb.) Urb.; Plinia formosa Urb.; Siphoneugena cantareirae Mattos; Siphoneugena micrantha Kausel

= Myrciaria floribunda =

Species of plant in the myrtle family

Myrciaria floribunda, commonly known as cambuizeiro, guavaberry or rumberry, is a species of plant in the family Myrtaceae. It can be found across South and Central America and the West Indies in dry or moist coastal woodlands, up to 300 metres above sea level. The guavaberry, which should not be confused with the guava, is a close relative of camu camu.

== Description ==
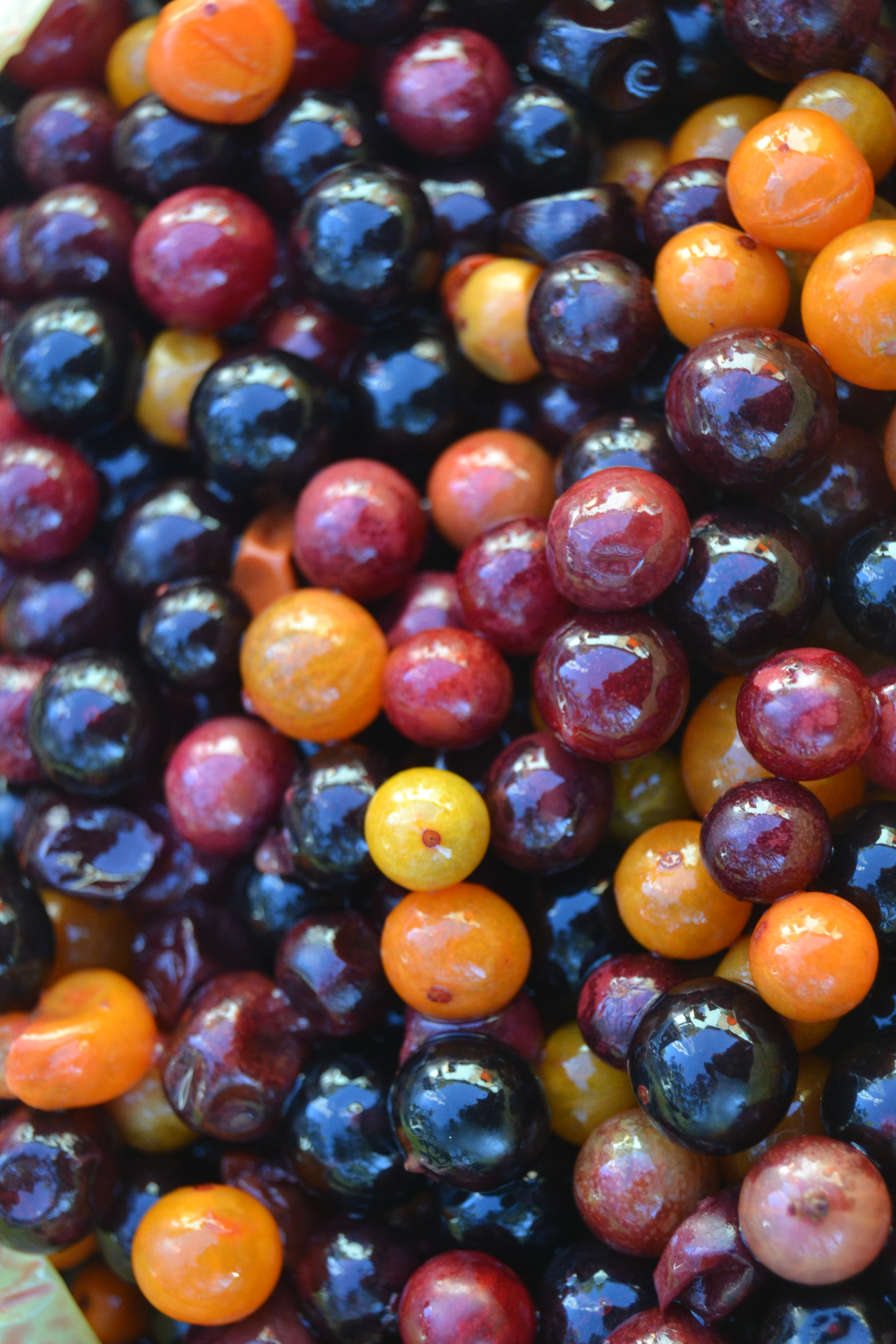
Guavaberry fruits

Guavaberry trees are slow growing and can reach 12–20 metres (39–66 ft) tall. They have red-brown branches and small pink and white flowers. The fruit, which are roughly half the size of cherries, are yellow-orange, dark-red, or purple with tanginess of a guava containing a small amount of translucent flesh surrounding a stone. The fruit has moderate sweetness. The fruit is rich in vitamin C, with the darker colored fruit having higher concentrations.

There is great genetic variability within the species, and Myrciaria floribunda can vary in form, structure and appearance, and that has given rise to a large number of botanical synonyms.

== Distribution ==
Guavaberry trees can be found growing wild in Central America, South America, Argentina, Belize, Bolivia, Brazil, Colombia, Costa Rica, and many Caribbean islands. The guavaberry has also been introduced to Florida, Hawaii, Bermuda, Philippines, and Tanzania.

== Uses ==
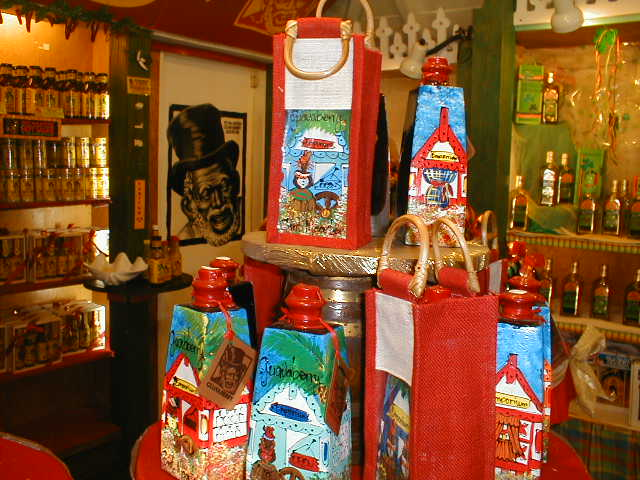
Guavaberry Emporium, Sint Maarten

Guavaberry is used to make jams and drinks. Guavaberry liqueur, which is made from rum, is a common Christmas drink on many of the islands, particularly in Sint Maarten and the Virgin Islands. The colonists from Denmark and Holland found it could flavor rum by infusion similar to infused schnapps. In the Dominican Republic it is associated with the eastern town of San Pedro de Macorís which has a large population of Eastern Caribbean descent.

Guavaberry coquito is one of many coquito flavored drinks from Puerto Rico associated with Christmas. The drink is made with spices, guavaberry, milk, sugar, coconut milk, eggs, and rum.
