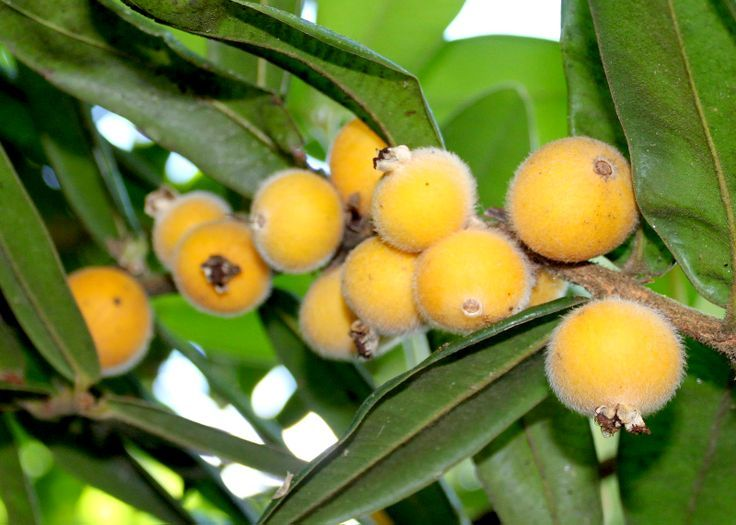

Conservation status
- Least Concern (IUCN 3.1)

Scientific classification
- Kingdom: Plantae
- Clade: Tracheophytes
- Clade: Angiosperms
- Clade: Eudicots
- Clade: Rosids
- Order: Myrtales
- Family: Myrtaceae
- Genus: Myrciaria
- Species: M. glazioviana

Binomial name
- Myrciaria glazioviana (Kiaersk.) G.M.Barroso ex Sobral

Synonyms
- Eugenia cabelludo var. glazioviana Kiaersk.; Paramyrciaria glazioviana (Kiaersk.) Sobral

= Myrciaria glazioviana =

Species of plant in the family Myrtaceae

Myrciaria glazioviana, the cabeluda, or yellow jaboticaba, is a species of plant in the family Myrtaceae.

== Distribution ==
Myrciaria glazioviana endemic to the states of Rio de Janeiro and Minas Gerais in south-eastern Brazil. The plant has also been found in Pernambuco and Bahia in north-eastern Brazil.

== Description ==
Myrciaria glazioviana is a tree or shrub that can grow to between 4 and 7 metres tall, with leaves between 7 and 11 cm long. It produces edible, yellow, fuzzy and spherical fruit with one or two seeds.
